= Western painting =

Painting produced in the Western world

Western painting represents a historical and contemporary Western painting tradition, from antiquity until the present time.

Initially serving imperial, private, civic, and religious patronage, Western painting later found audiences in the aristocracy and middle class. From the Middle Ages through the Renaissance, painters worked for the church and a wealthy aristocracy. The Renaissance saw painting advance significantly, in conjunction with the refinement of drawing, perspective, ambitious architecture, tapestry, stained glass, sculpture, and advent of the printing press.

Beginning with the Baroque era, artists received private commissions from a more educated and prosperous middle class. "Art for art's sake" started finding expression in the Romantic painters, influencing Impressionism.

Western painting was primarily concerned with representational and traditional art until the mid-19th century, when more modern, abstract and conceptual forms gained favor. Commercial museums and galleries also became established in the art world and continued providing patronage into the 20th century and contemporary era.

== Pre-history ==
Image Gallery (Click "Show" to view)
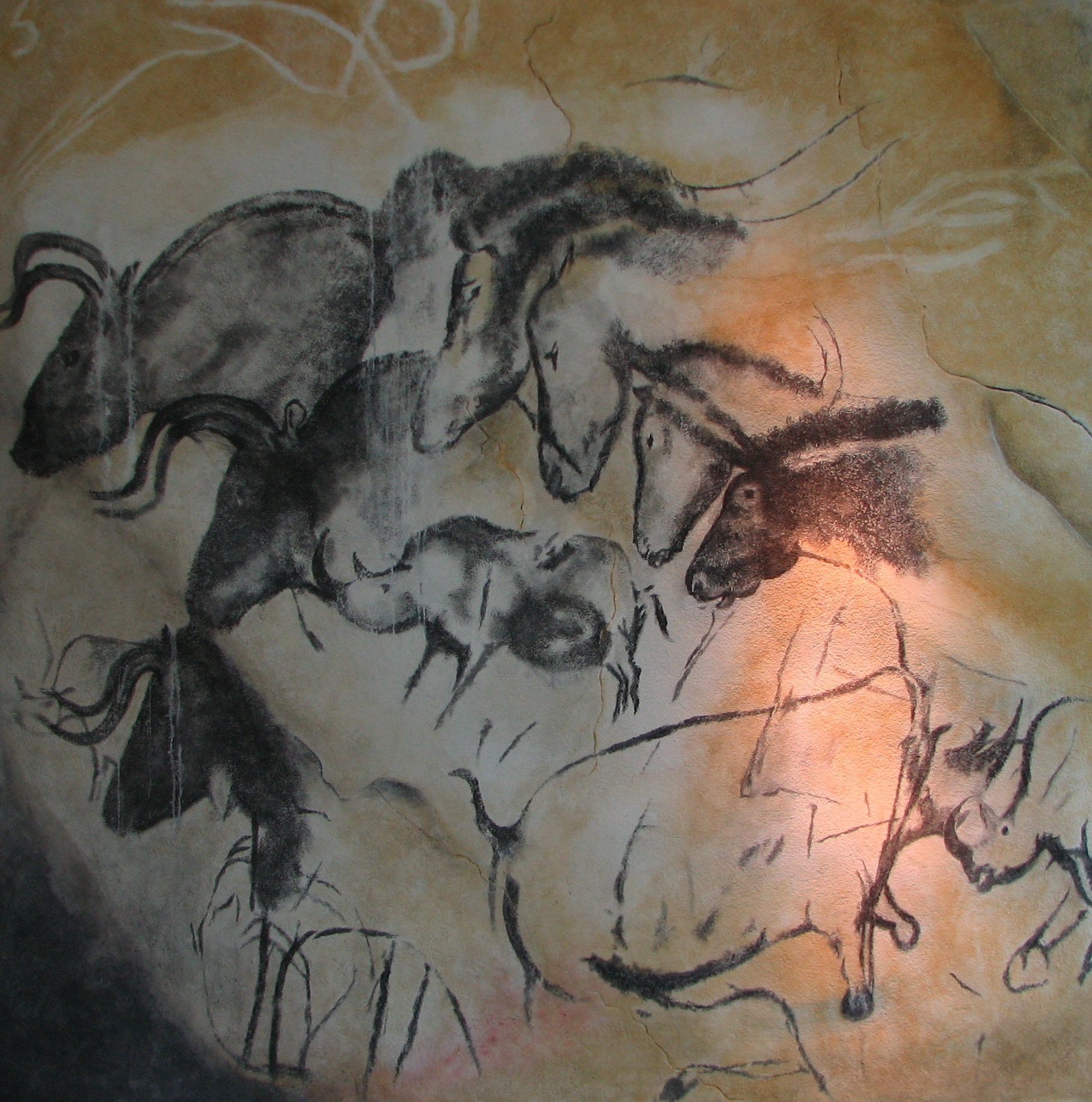
Chauvet cave, in Ardèche, showing Aurochs, horses, and rhinos probably Aurignacian, the oldest known Western cave paintings (35,000–30,000 BC, replica, Anthropos museum).

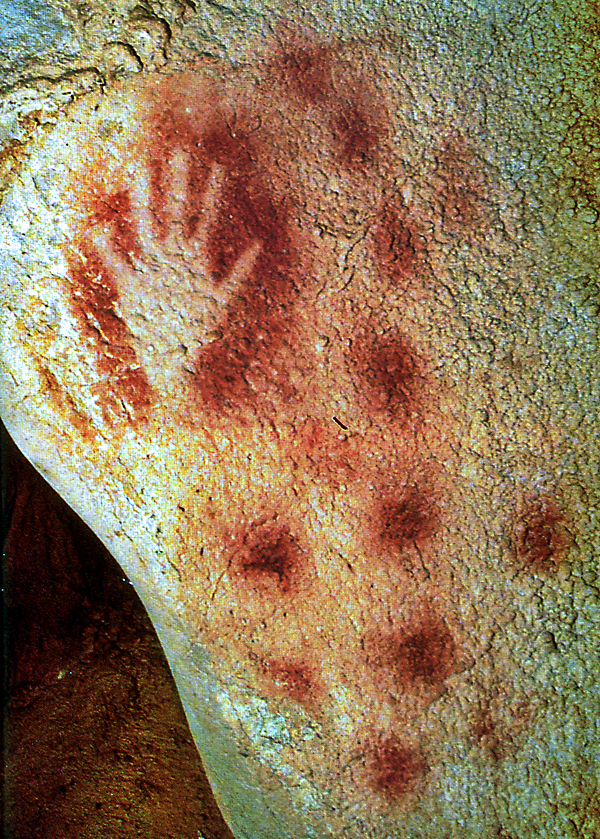
Pech Merle cave painting in Cabrerets (c. 25,000 BC).

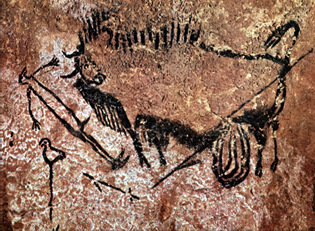
The "Shaft of the Dead Man" or the "Well Scene" from Lascaux Cave. A bird-headed man with an erection, and a bison.

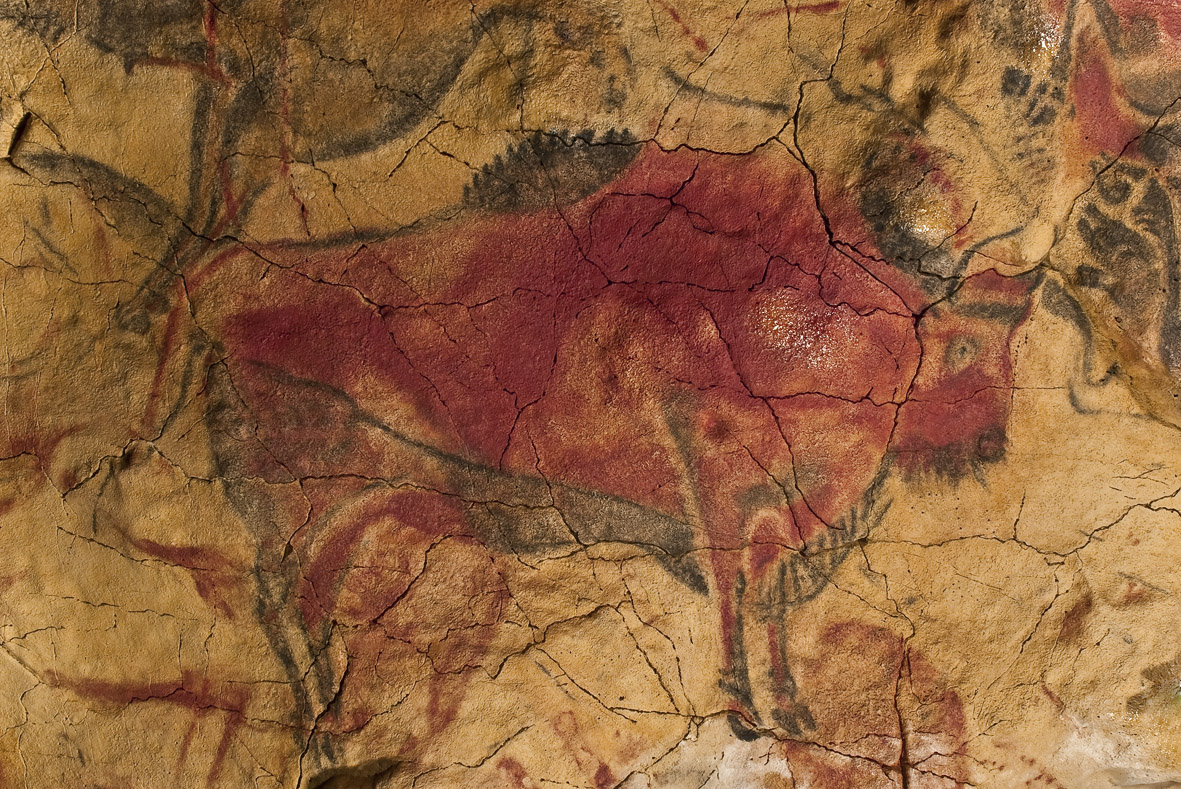
Altamira cave bison (c. 14,000–12,000 BC).

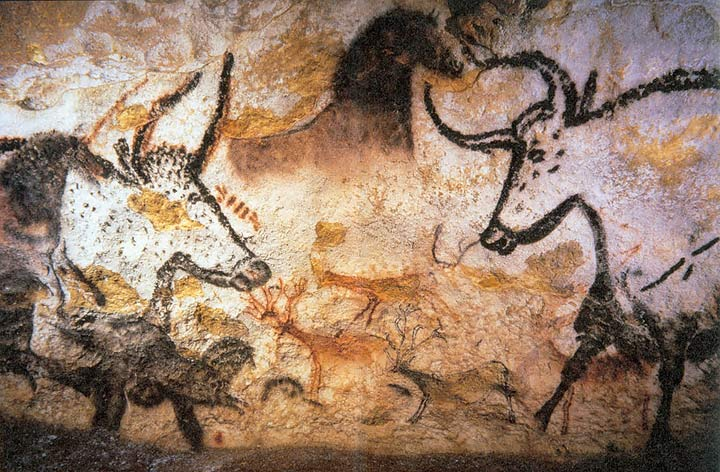
Aurochs, horses and deer at Lascaux.

Stamp depicting the marching warriors at Cingle de la Mola, the most notable Mesolithic artwork.

The history of Western painting traces back to cave and rock painting sites in Stone Age France, such as Chauvet (c. 30,000 BC) and Lascaux (c. 15,000–10,000 BC), and northern Spain, such as Altamira (c. 15,000 BC) and Cingle de la Mola (7000–4000 BC). They are painted using red ochre and black pigment, including dots and stenciled hands, as well as various animals, human-animal hybrids, and hunting scenes.

== Greece and Rome ==
=== Bronze Age Aegean Civilizations ===
==== Minoan ====
Image Gallery (Click "Show" to view)
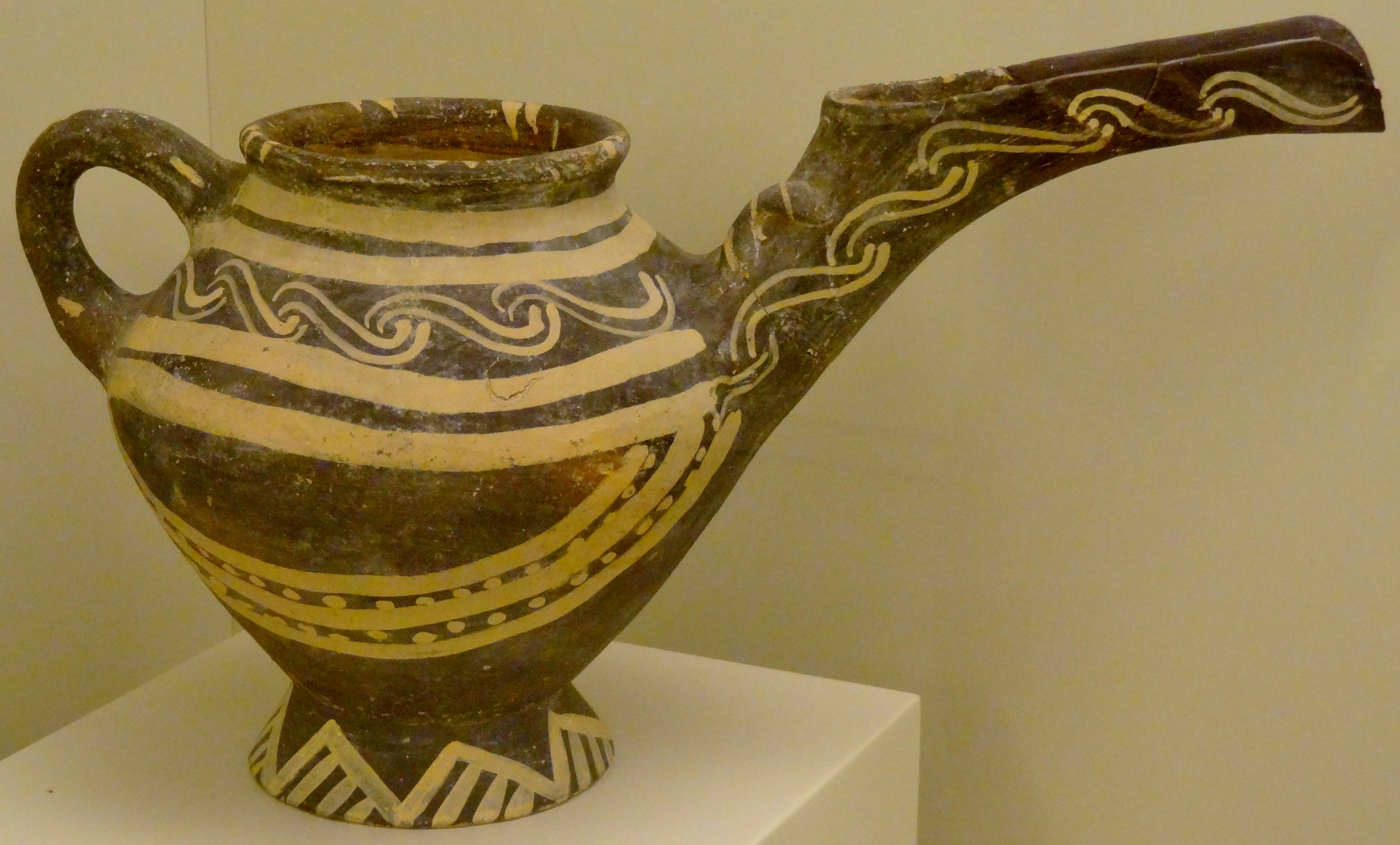
"White style" Vasiliki ware pottery (Early, c. 2300–2000 BC, AMH).

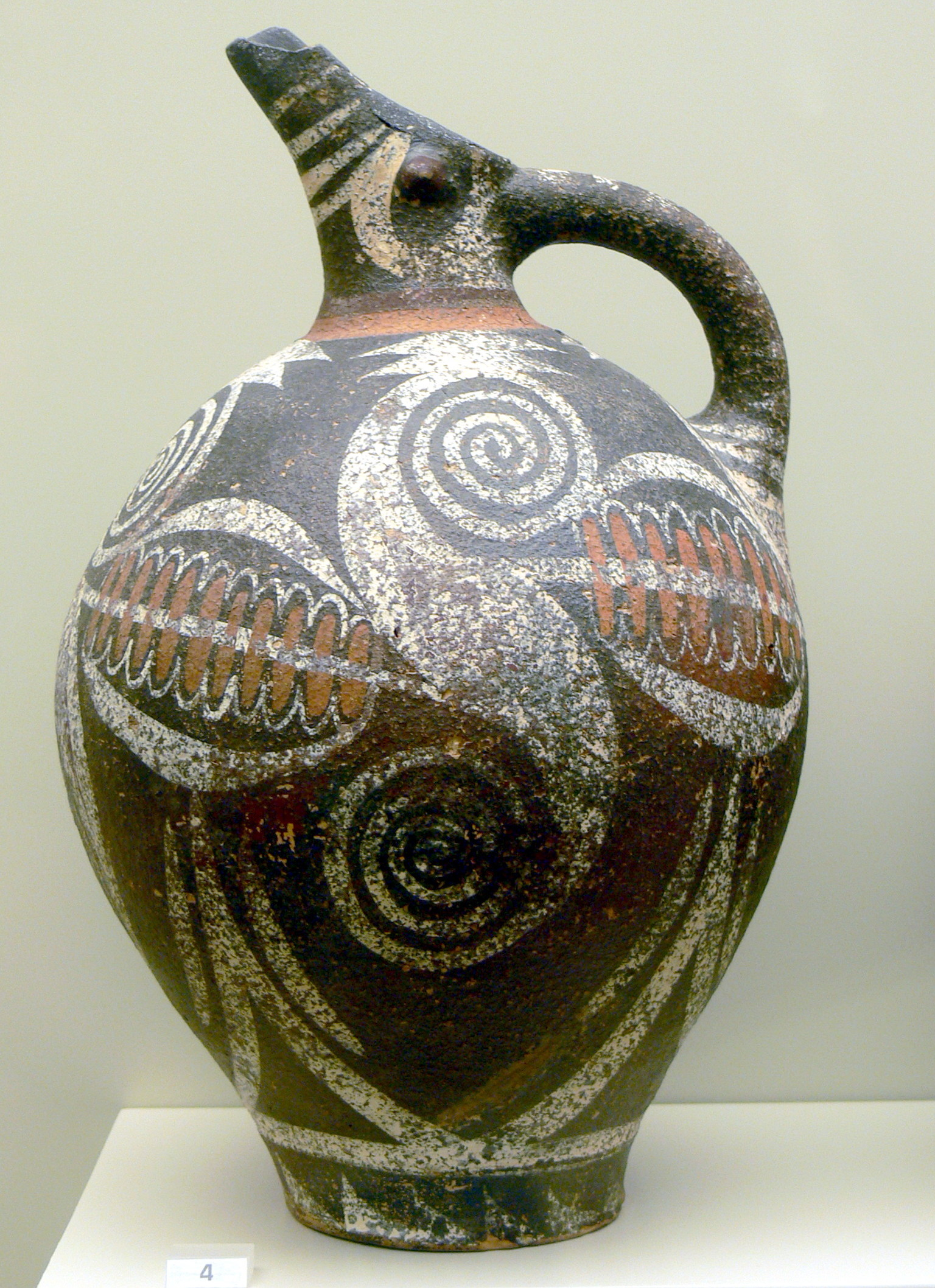
Kamares Ware pottery (Middle, c. 2100-1700 BC, AMH).

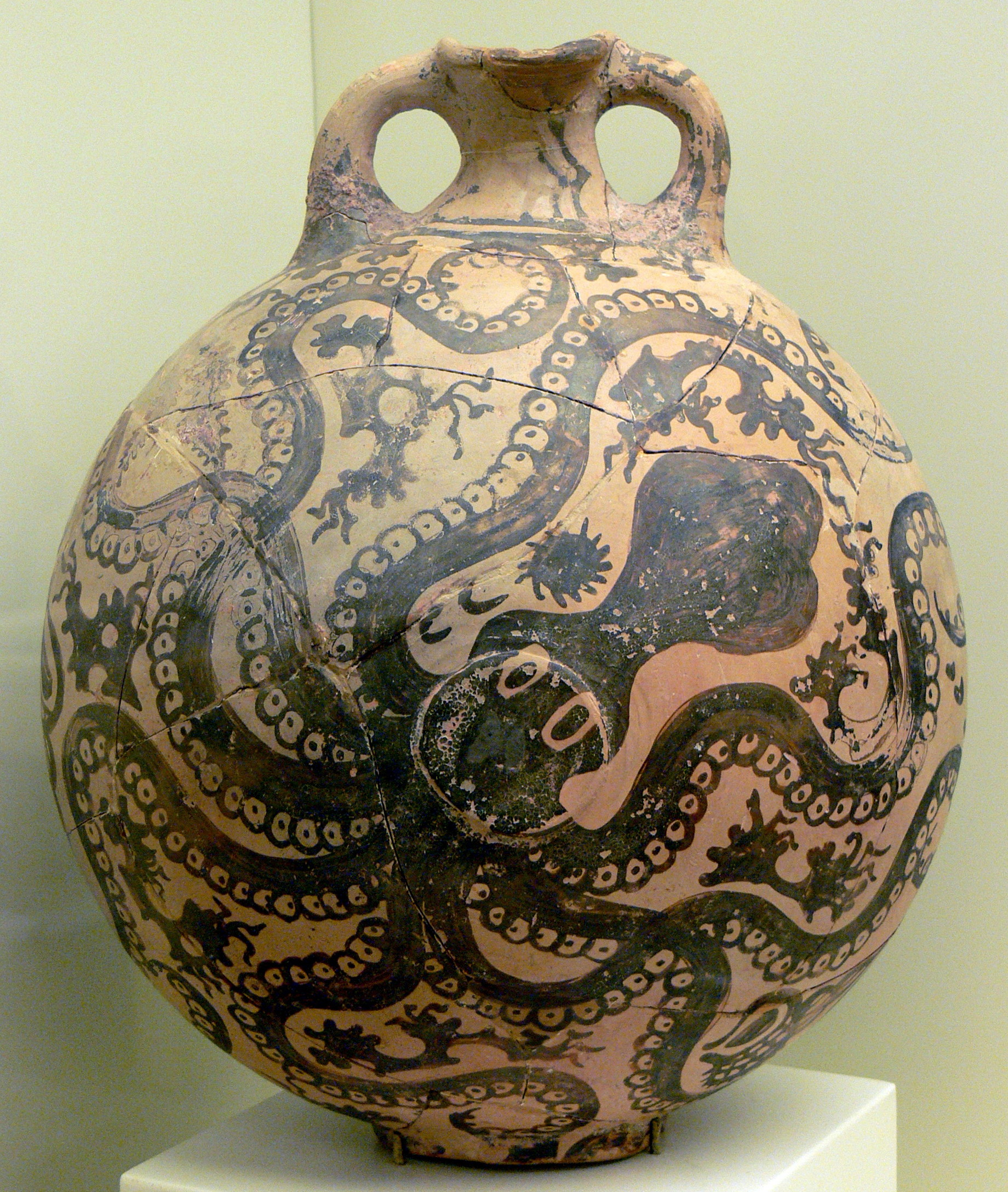
"Marine Style" flask with octopus (Late, c. 1500-1450 BC, AMH).

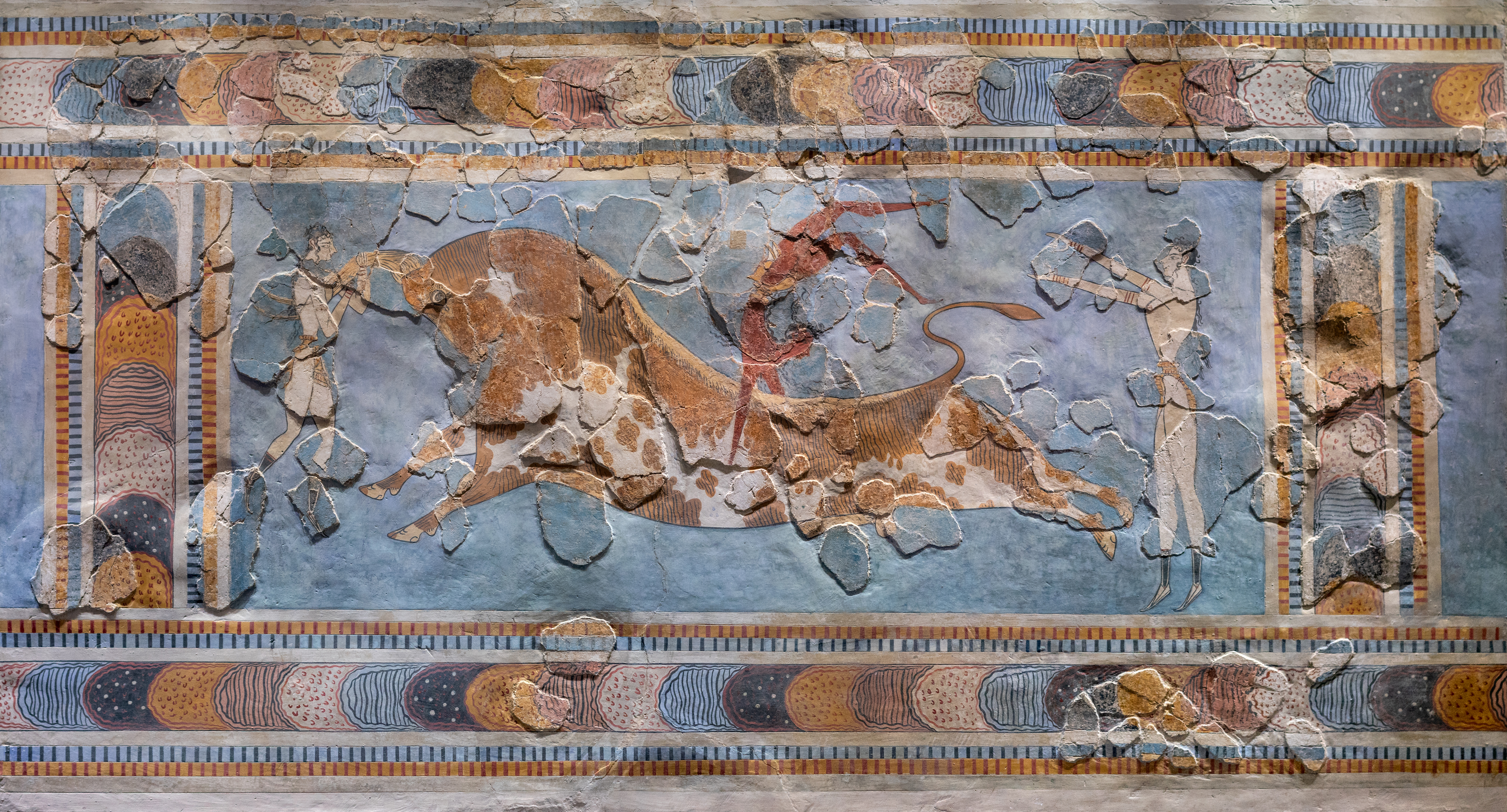
Bull-leaping fresco at Palace at Knossos (Late, c. 1450 BC, AMH).

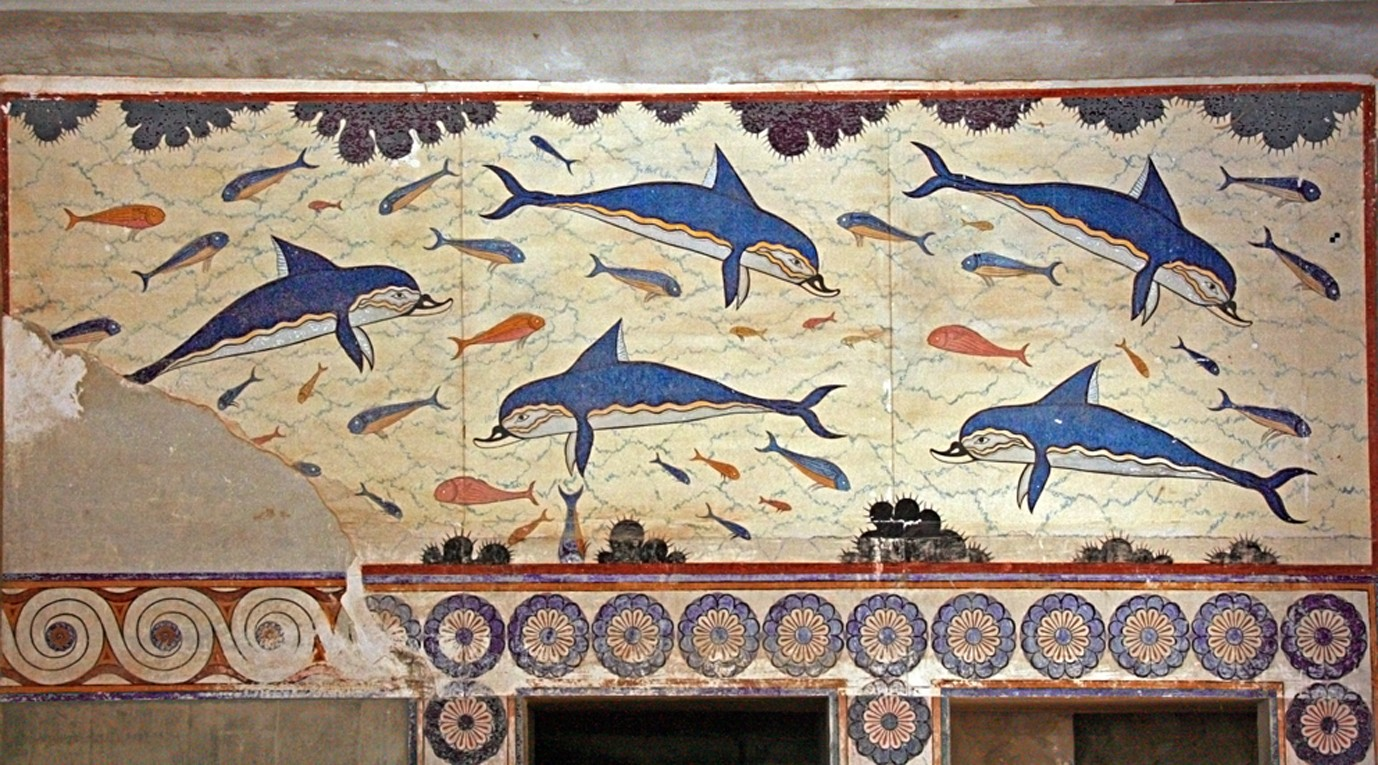
Dolphin fresco at Knossos (Late, c. 1450 BC, AMH).

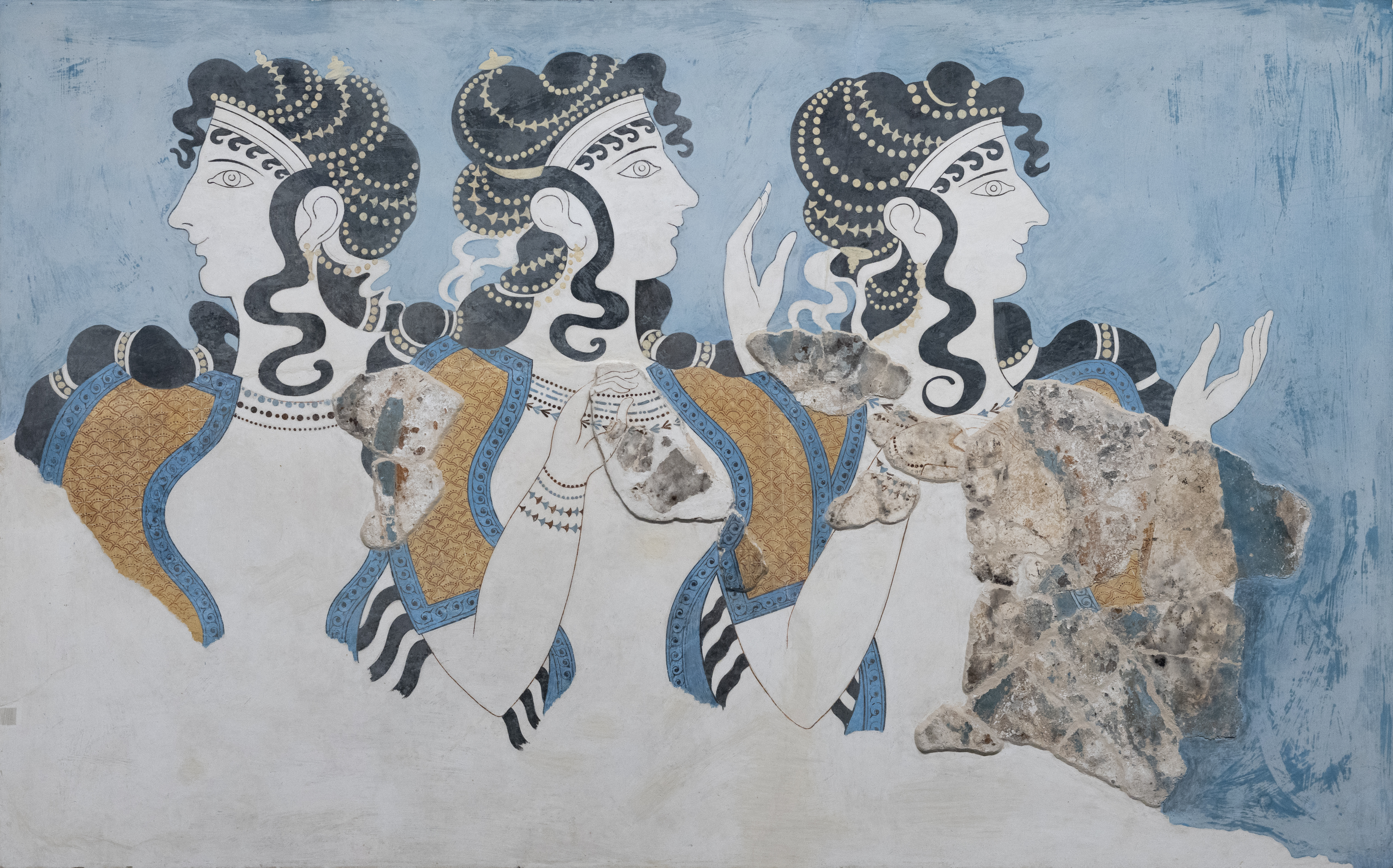
Fresco of women at Knossos (Late, c. 1450 BC, AMH).

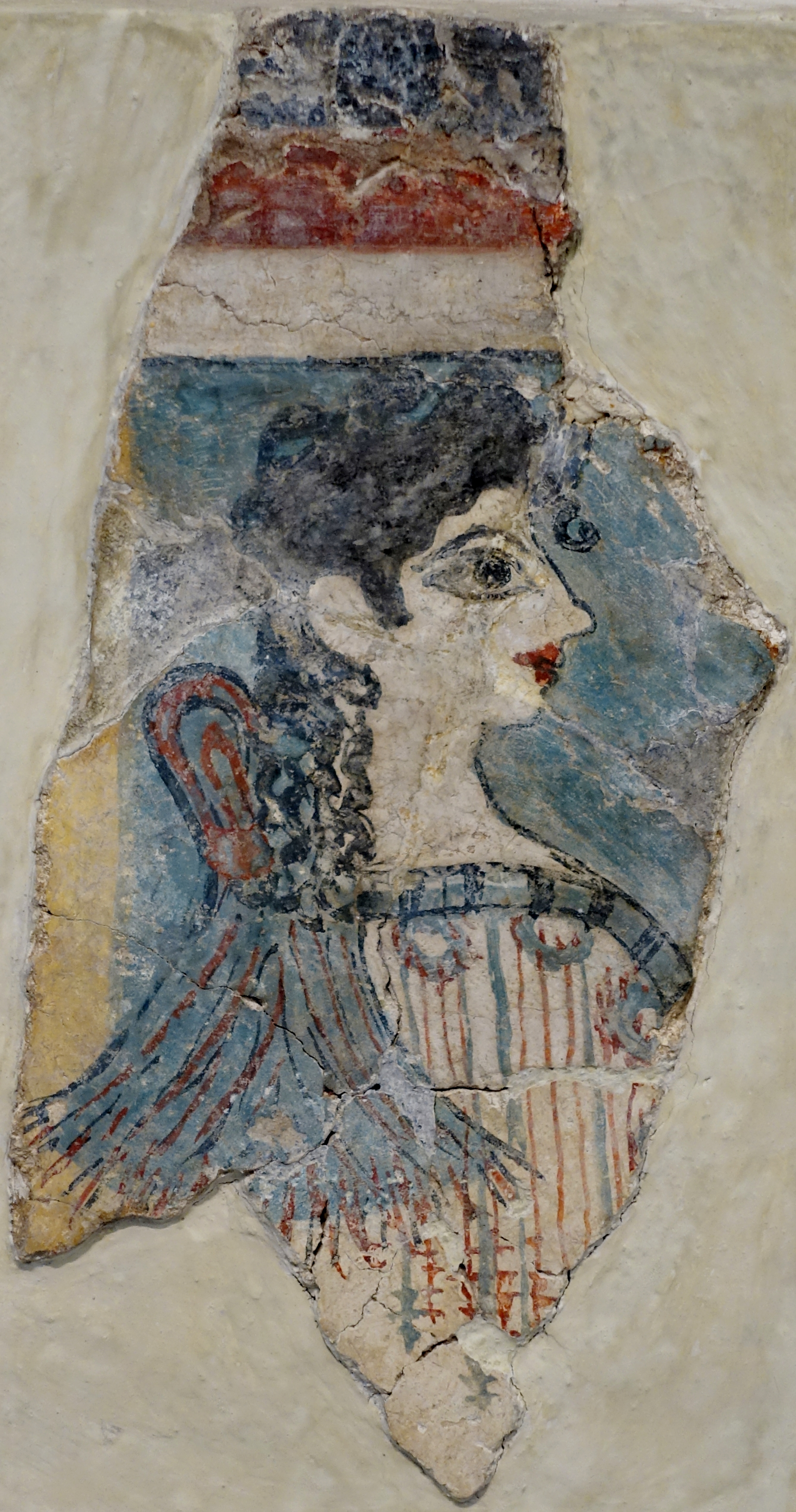
Fresco of a lady at Knossos, with knotted hairstyle, known as La Parisienne (Late, c. 1400 BC, AMH).

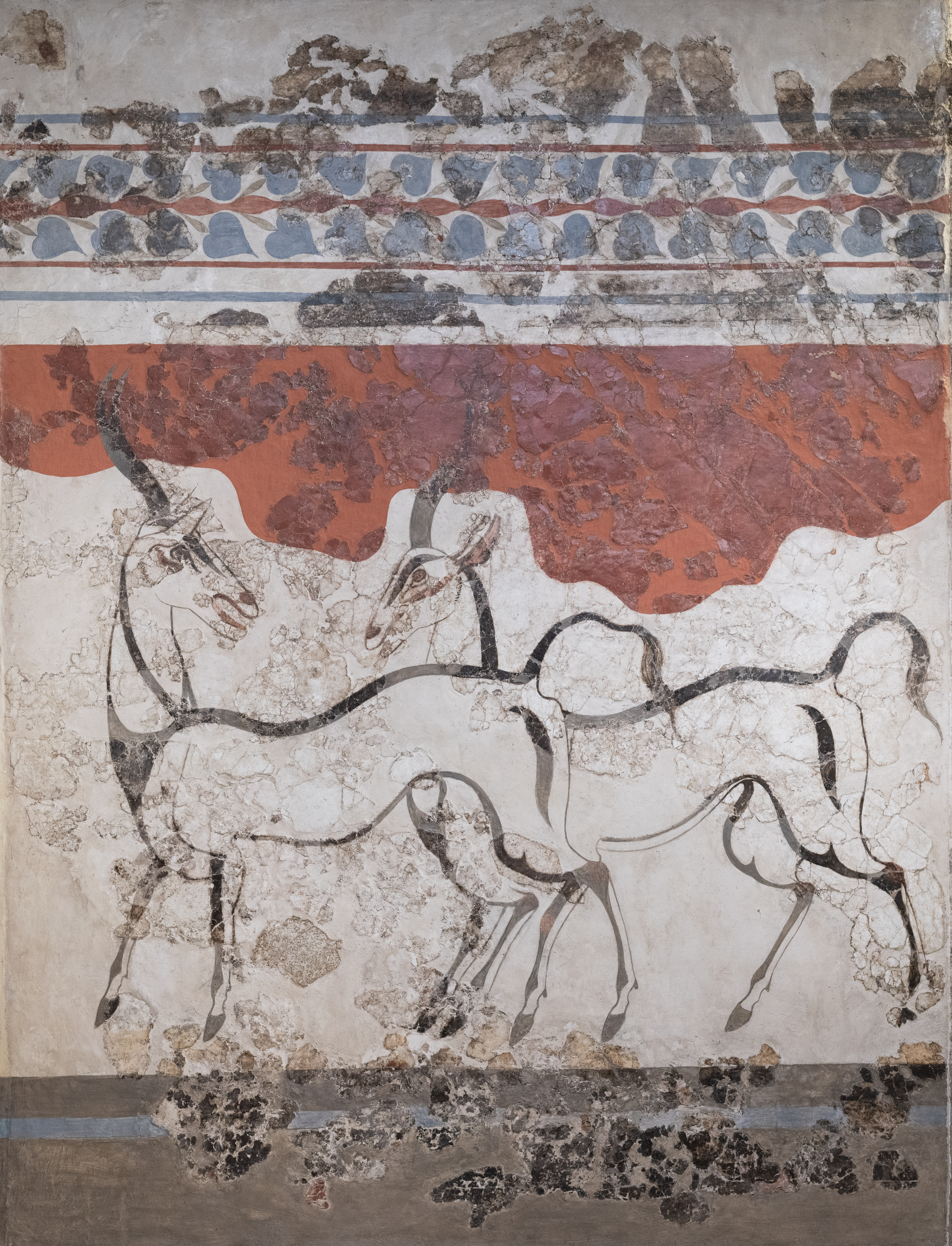
Akrotiri Antelope fresco (Late, c. 1600 BC, NAMA).

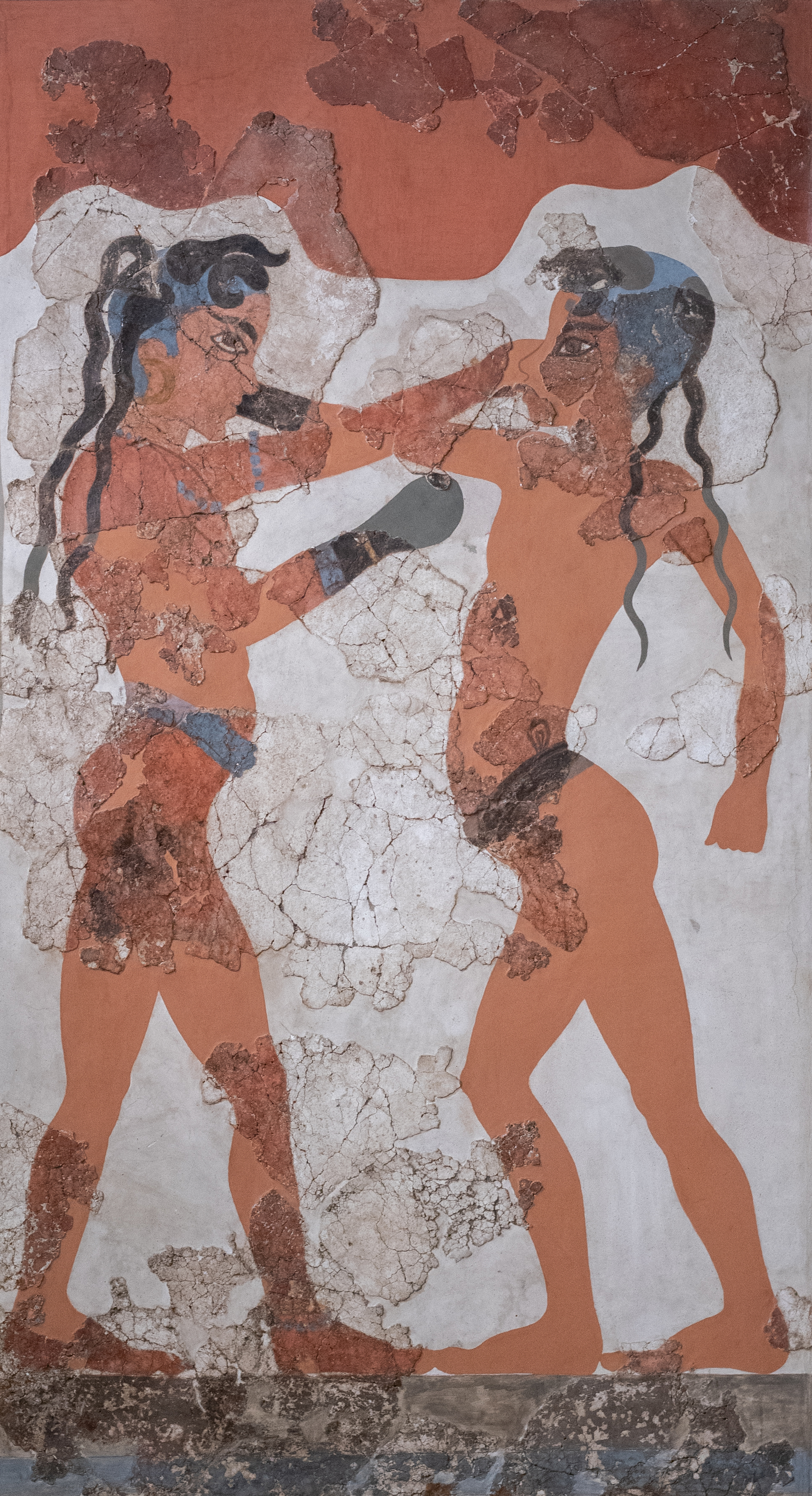
Akrotiri Boxer Fresco (Late, c. 1600 BC, NAMA).

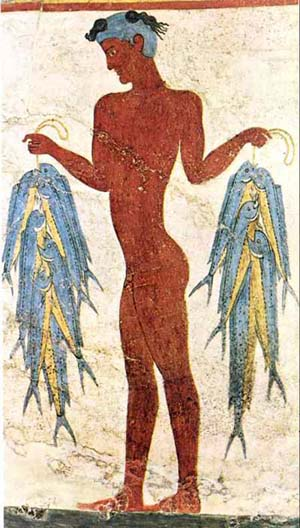
Akrotiri fisherman fresco (Late, c. 1600 BC, Museum of Prehistoric Thira).

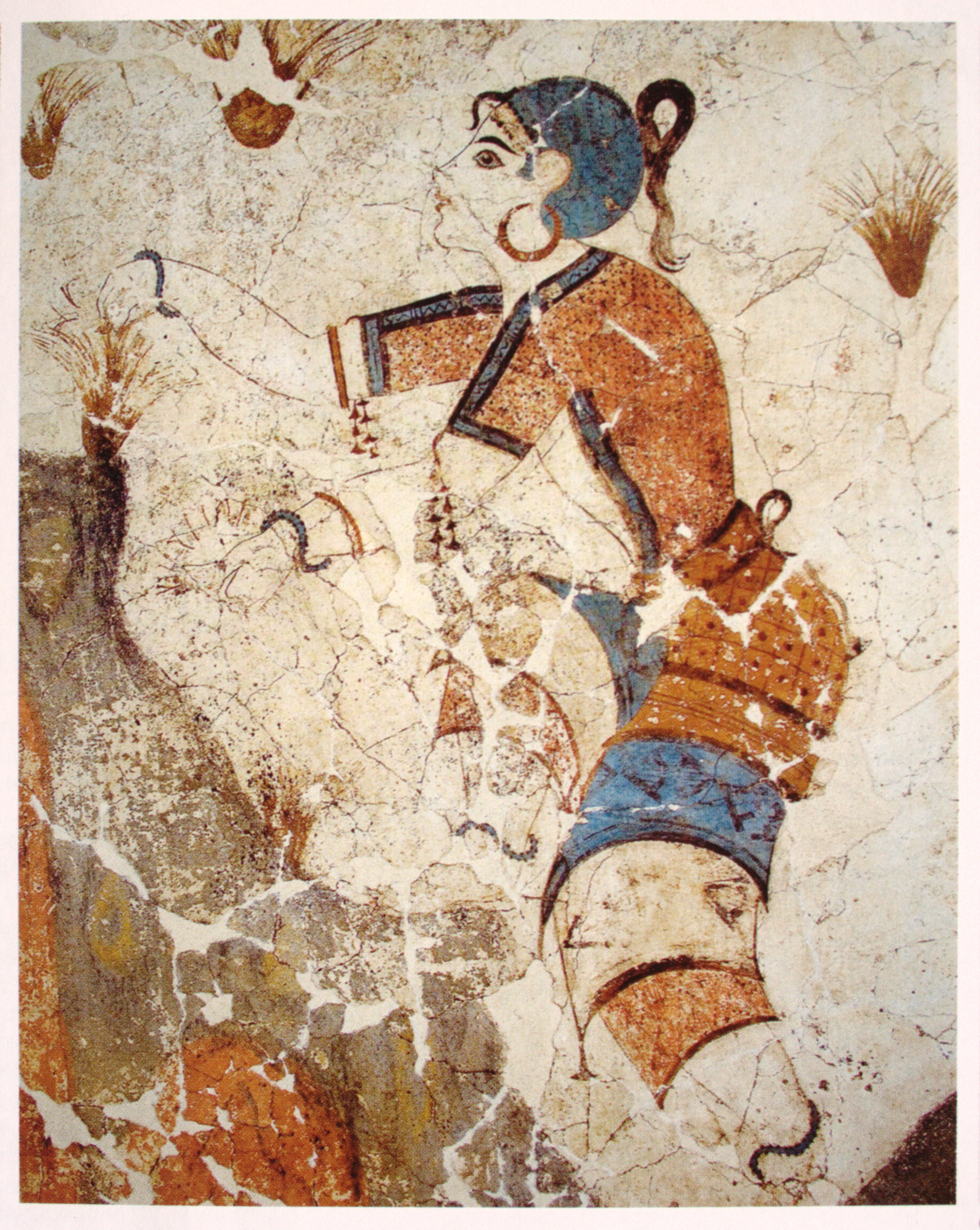
Akrotiri lady saffron gatherer. (Late, c. 1600 BC, Museum of Prehistoric Thira)

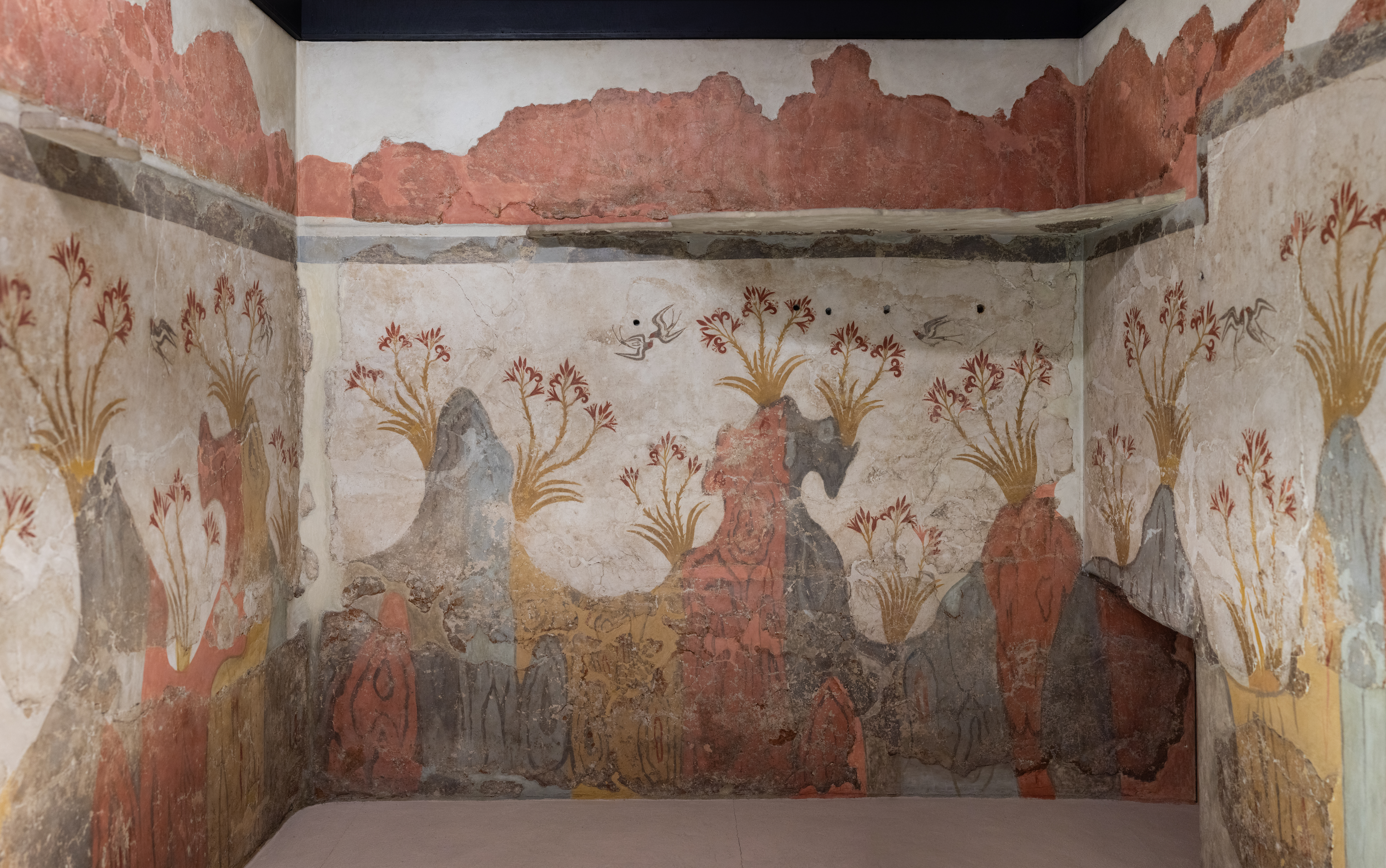
Akrotiri Spring Fresco, landscape with volcanic rock, lilies, and swallows courting (Late, c. 1600 BC, NAMA).

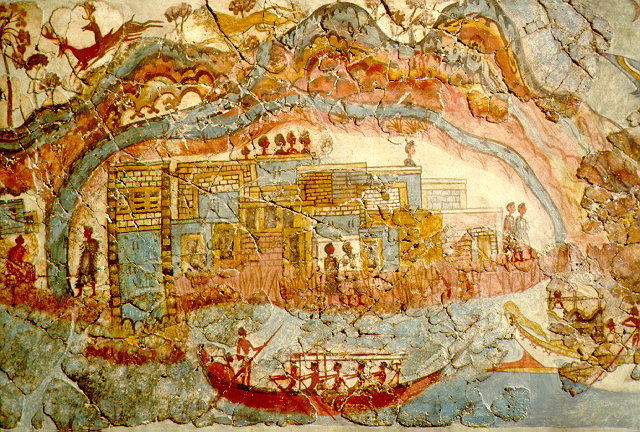
Detail of Akrotiri ship procession, approaching a town, showing buildings' architecture (Late, c. 1600 BC, NAMA).

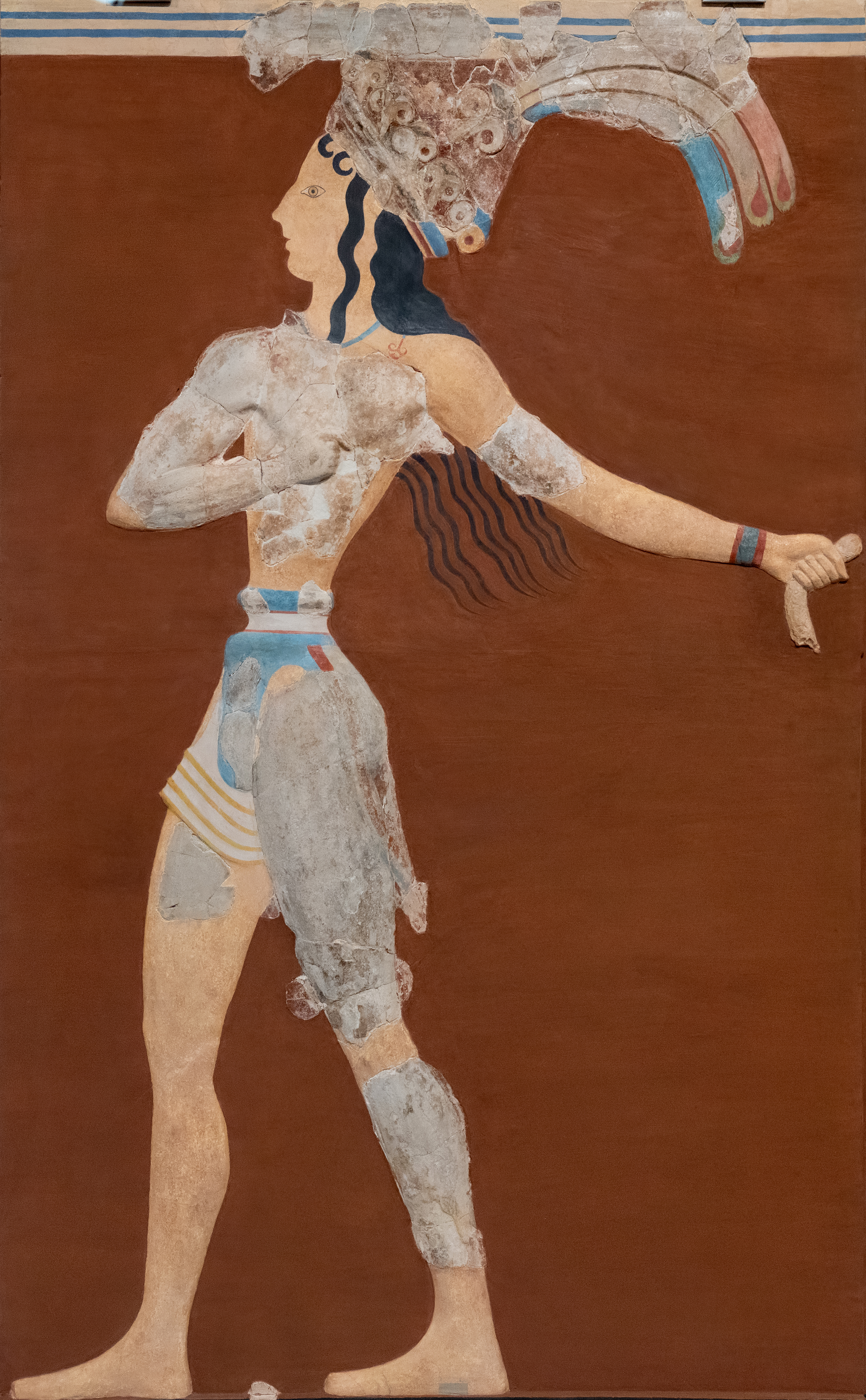
Prince of the Lilies fresco, Knossos (Late, c. 1500-1450 BC, AMH).

Archaeologists use pottery and other material culture to divide the ancient Aegean, Bronze Age Minoan civilization of Crete into three main phases: Early (3100–2100 BC), Middle (2100–1700 BC), and Late (1700–1075 BC). Minoan painting is found on pottery and walls, with frescos displaying "the earliest pure landscapes anywhere", like at the Palace of Knossos, discovered by British archaeologist Arthur Evans (1851–1941); and Akrotiri, discovered by Greek archaeologist Spyridon Marinatos (1901–1974), and buried by the Theran eruption (c. 1600 BC).

British archaeologist Sinclair Hood (1917–2021) described an "essential quality of the finest Minoan art, the ability to create an atmosphere of movement and life although following a set of highly formal conventions". The most notable repositories are the Heraklion Archaeological Museum (AMH) and National Archaeological Museum, Athens (NAMA).

Minoan painting was influenced by nearby Ancient Egypt and the Near East, which had long produced sophisticated paintings. Yet the mysterious character of the small, yet wealthy mercantile Minoan cities seems very different, with little evidence of large temple-based religion, monarchs, or warfare, and "all the imaginative power and childlike freshness of a very young culture". (Note: Note the Minoan language, such as Linear A, and Minoan hieroglyphs, remains undeciphered.)

==== Mycenaean and Cycladic ====
Image Gallery (Click "Show" to view)
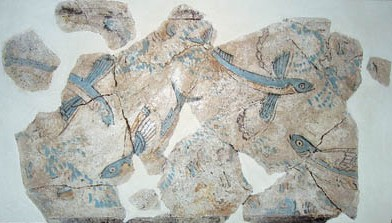
Flying fish (17th century BC, NAMA) from Phylakopi.

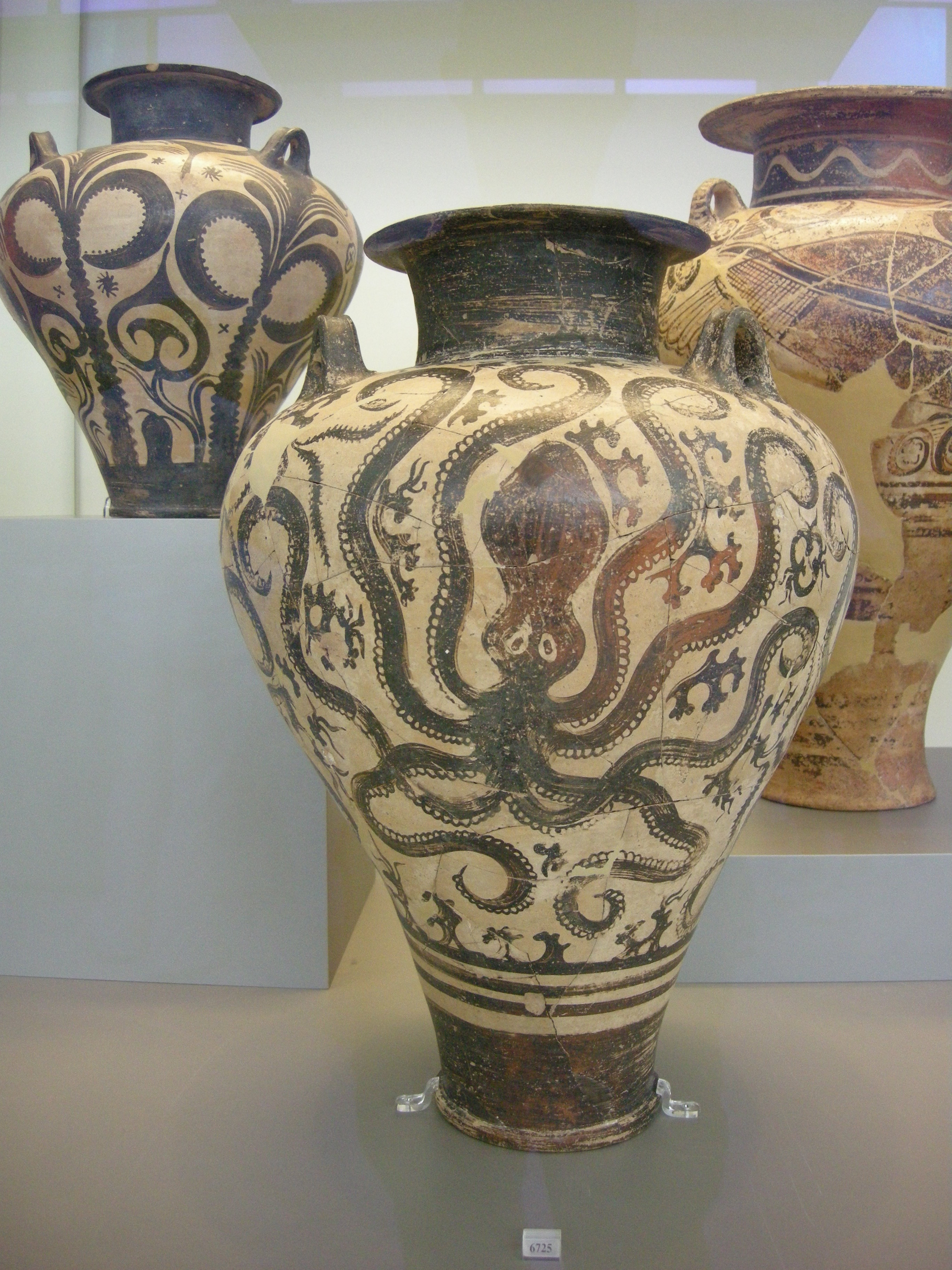
Mycenaean amphora (15th Century BC, NAMA).

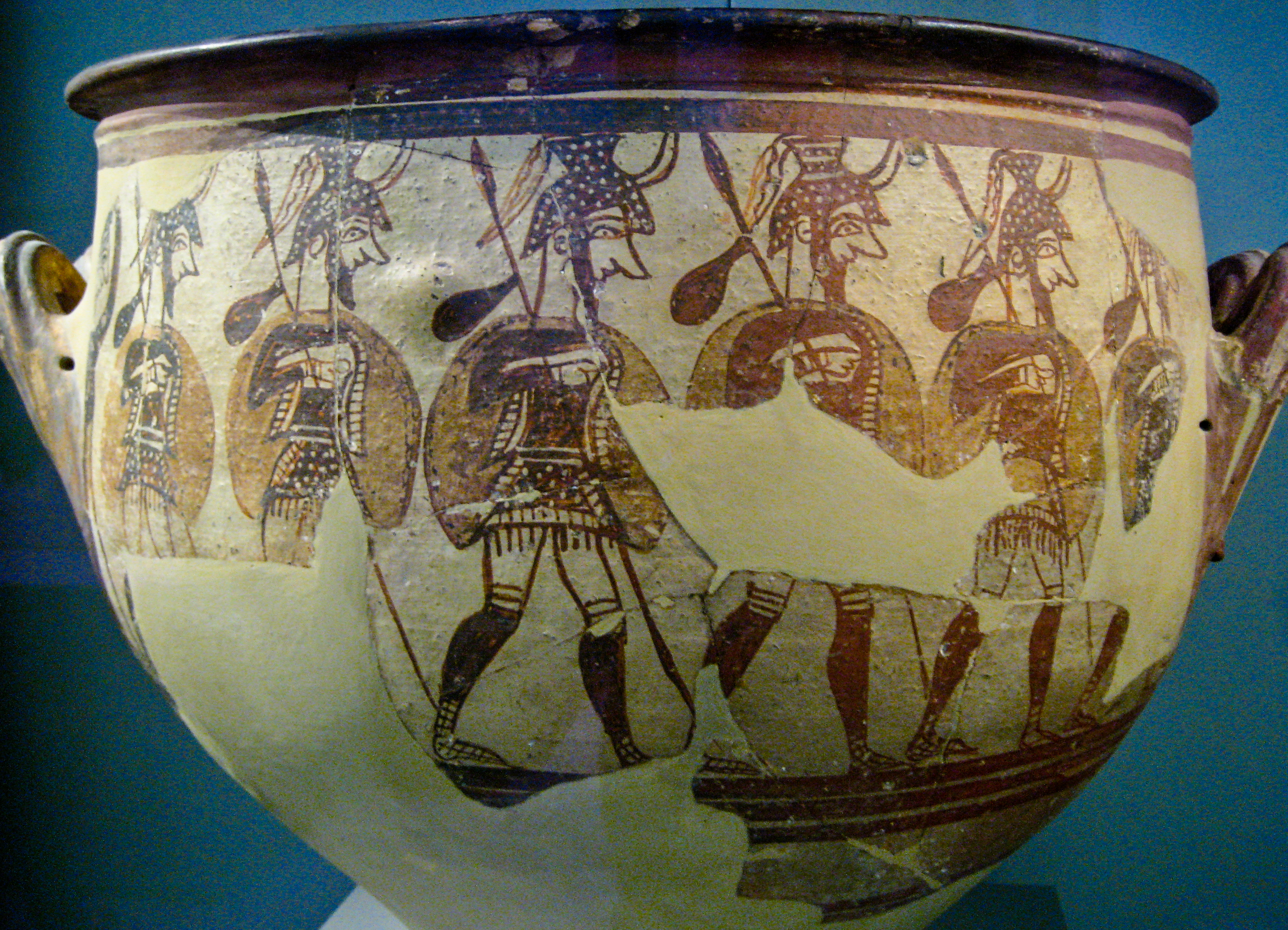
Mycenaean Warrior Vase (12th Century BC, NAMA)

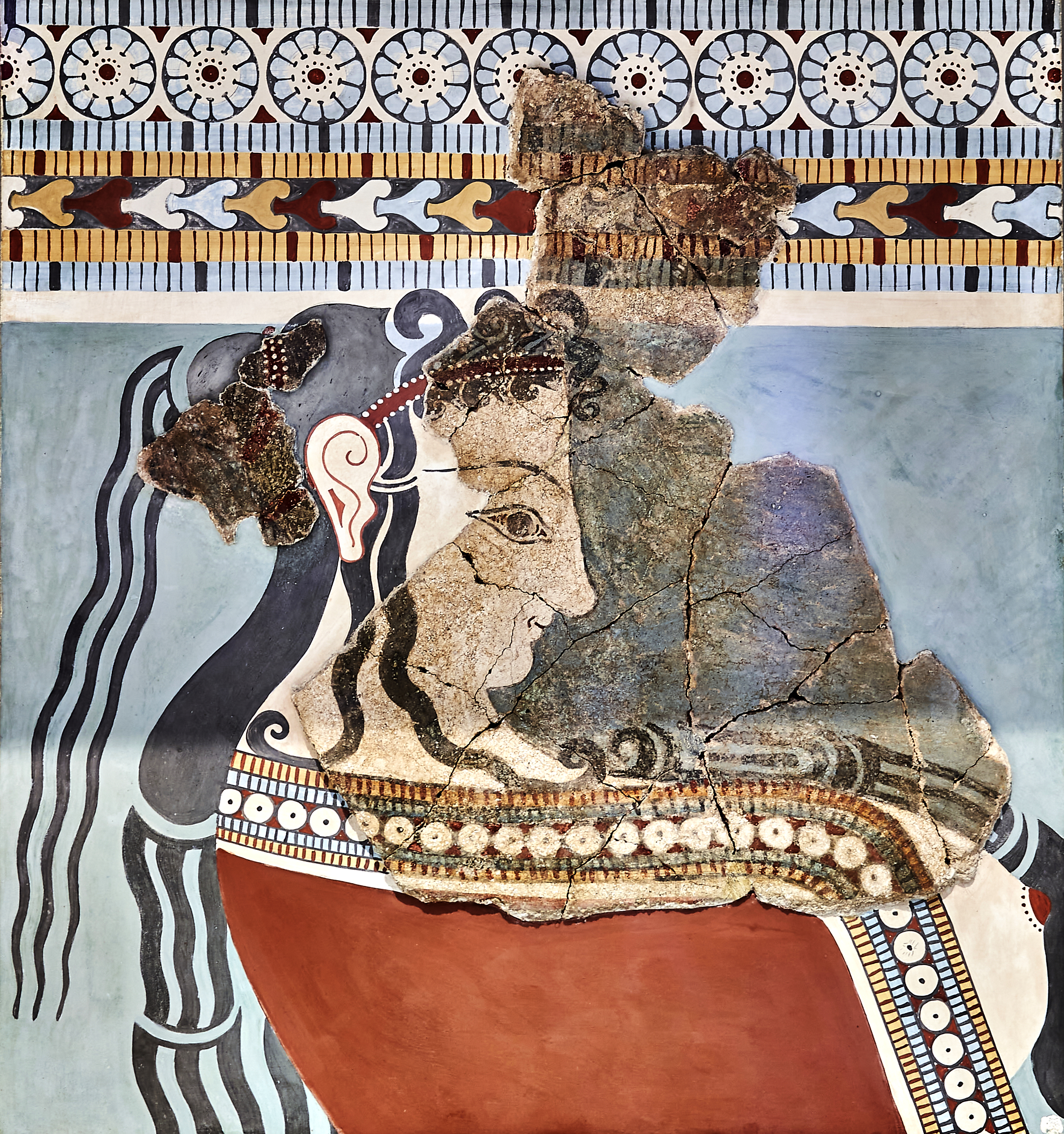
Mycenaean lady (13th century BC, NAMA), from Mycenean wall frescoes at Tiryns.

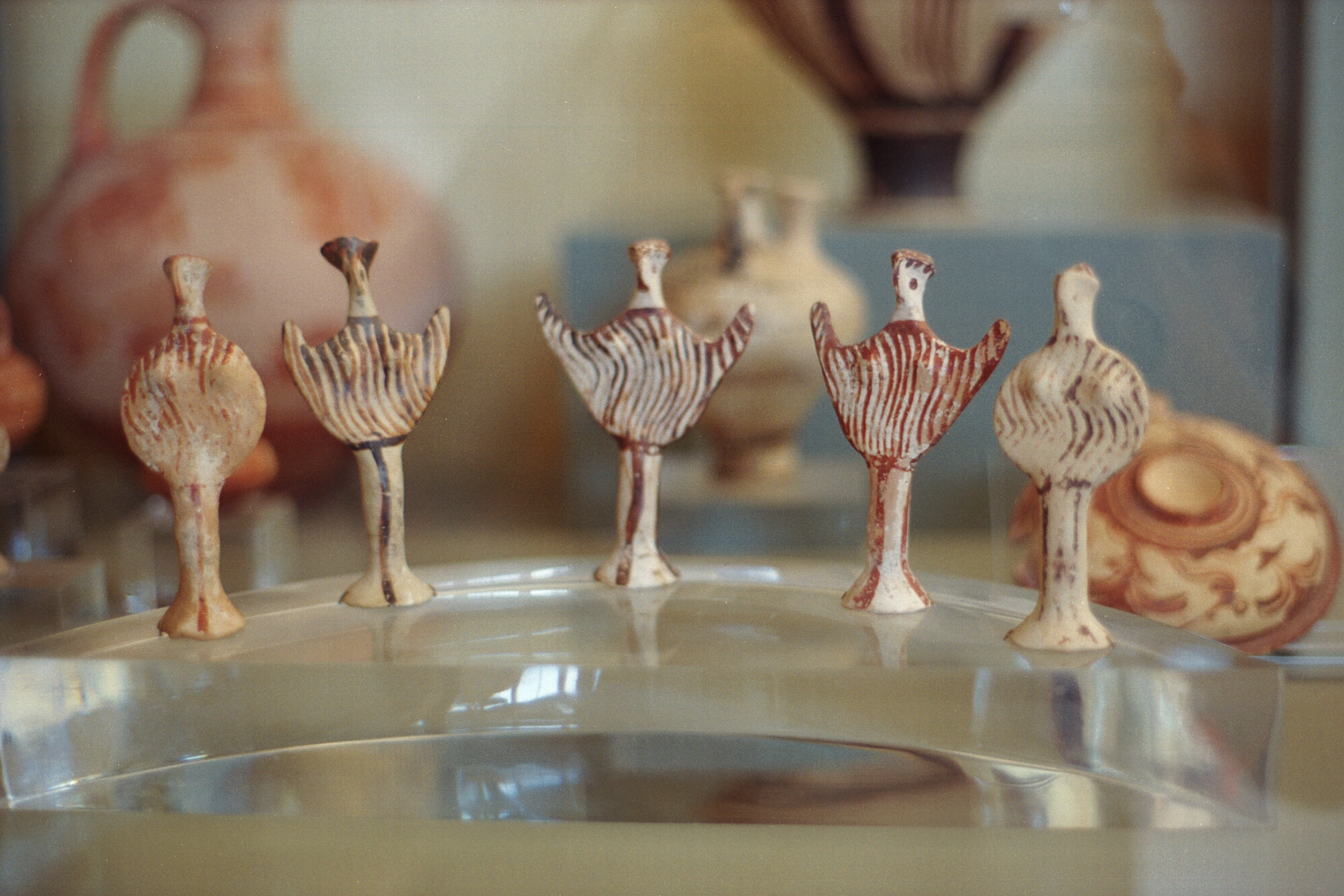
Mycenaean psi, phi and tau type figurines (14th–13th century BC, Archaeological Museum of Nemea). They are generally painted with wavy lines, suggestive of clothing .

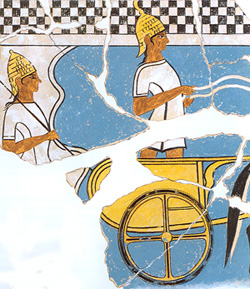
Chariot warriors (c. 1350 BC, Archaeological Museum of Chora) from Palace of Nestor

Mycenaean lady (13th century BC, NAMA), from the “Chief Priest’s House” in the cult centre of the citadel of Mycenae.

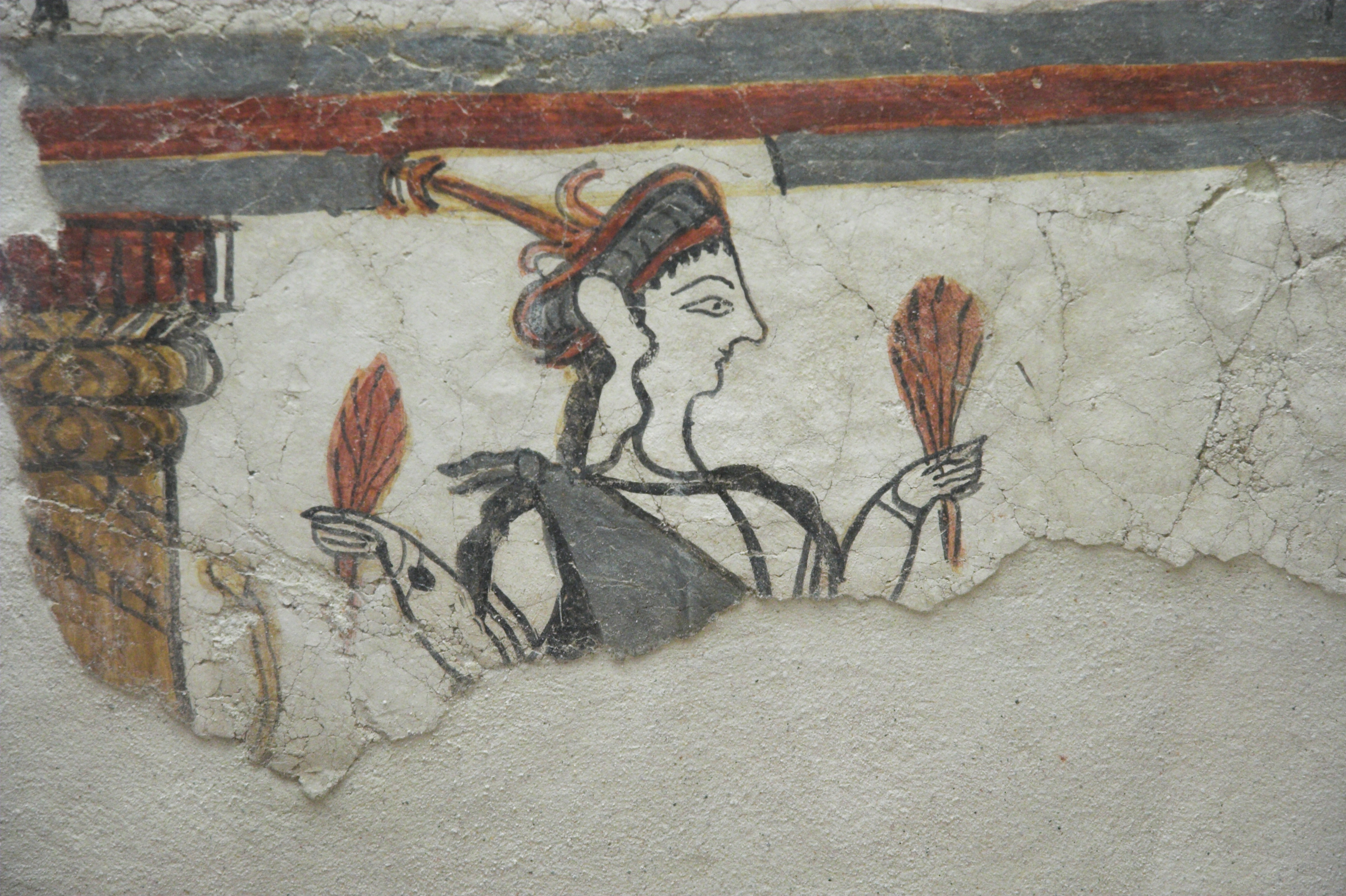
A goddess (c. 1200 BC, Archaeological Museum of Mycenae) from the "House of the Frescoes" in the cult centre of the citadel of Mycenae.

Human-animal hybrids, or "donkey-headed daemons", Minoan Genius in a hunting scene (13th century BC, NAMA), from the "Ramp House" in the citadel of Mycenae.

The Minoans clearly dominated art of the contemporaneous Mycenaean (c. 1750–1050 BC) and Cycladic (c. 3300–1100 BC) civilizations, even after Mycenaean occupation of Crete (c. 1450 BC); but few aspects of the tradition survived the collapse of Mycenaean Greece, during the Trojan War (c. 1194–1184 BC) and Greek Dark Ages (c. 1180–800 BC). (Note: Troy was long believed to be legendary, until the excavations of Heinrich Schliemann (1822–1890).) Several Mycenaean frescoes are at the Palace of Nestor and Tiryns.

=== Classical Antiquity ===
==== Ancient Greece ====
Image Gallery (Click "Show" to view)
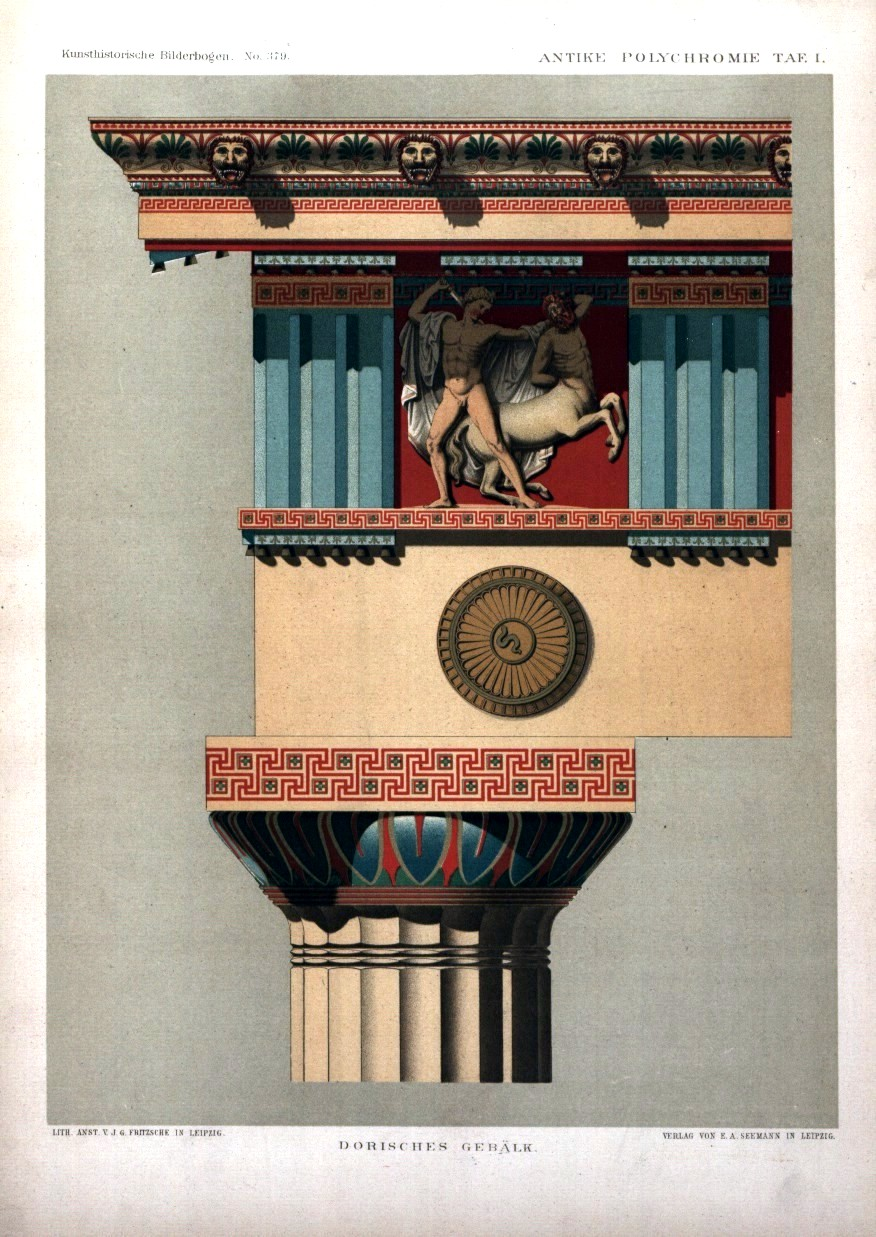
1883 reconstruction of polychromy on the entablature of a Doric temple.

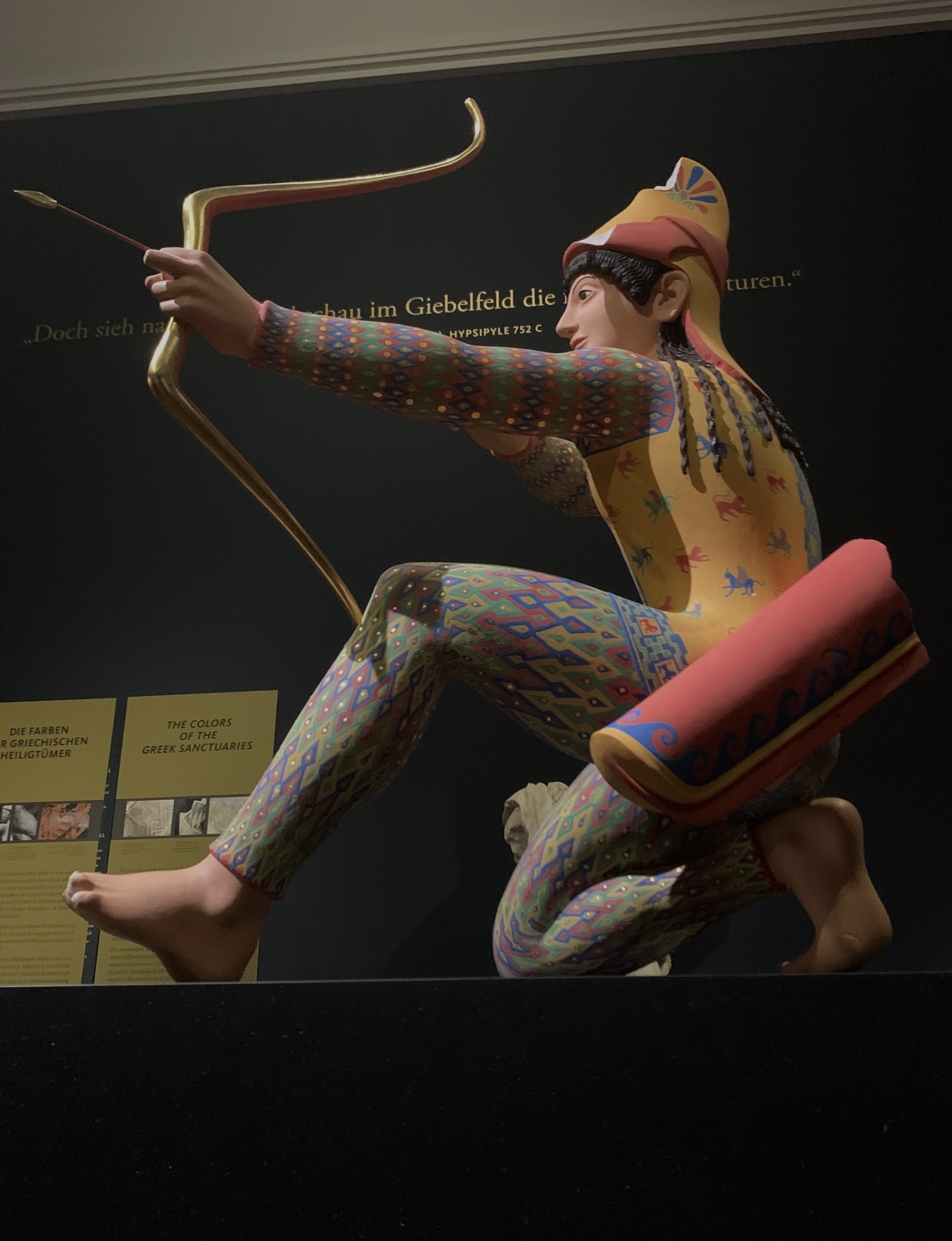
An experimental polychrome reconstruction from Gods in Color, of the marble statue of an archer from the western pediment of the Temple of Aphaia on Aigina. (Archaic, c. 490 BC, Liebieghaus)

Polychromy reconstruction of the Alexander Sarcophagus (Hellenistic, late 4th century BC, Istanbul Archaeological Museums).

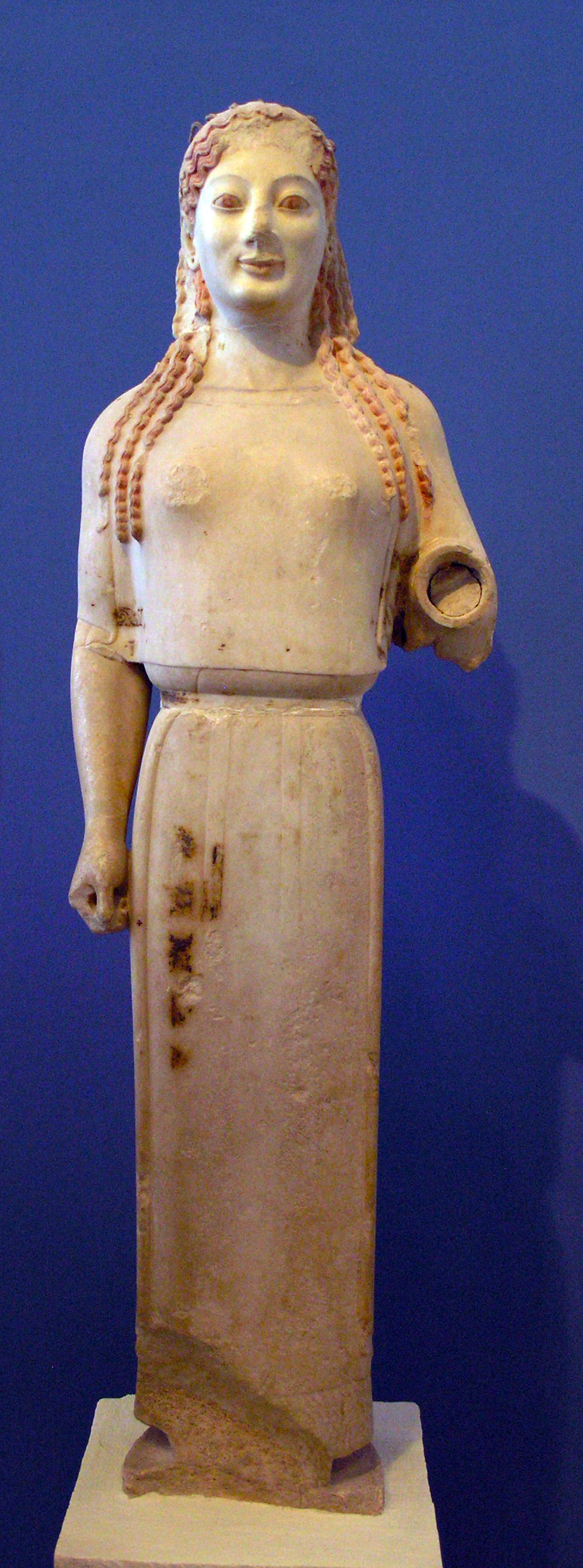
Polychrome remnants on the Peplos Kore (Archaic, c. 530 BC, Acropolis Museum).

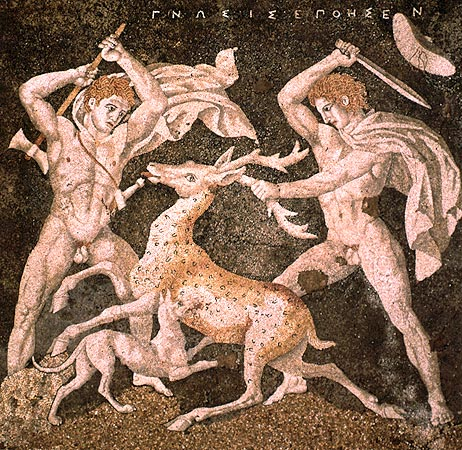
Stag Hunt Mosaic (Hellenistic, late 4th century BC, Archaeological Museum of Pella).

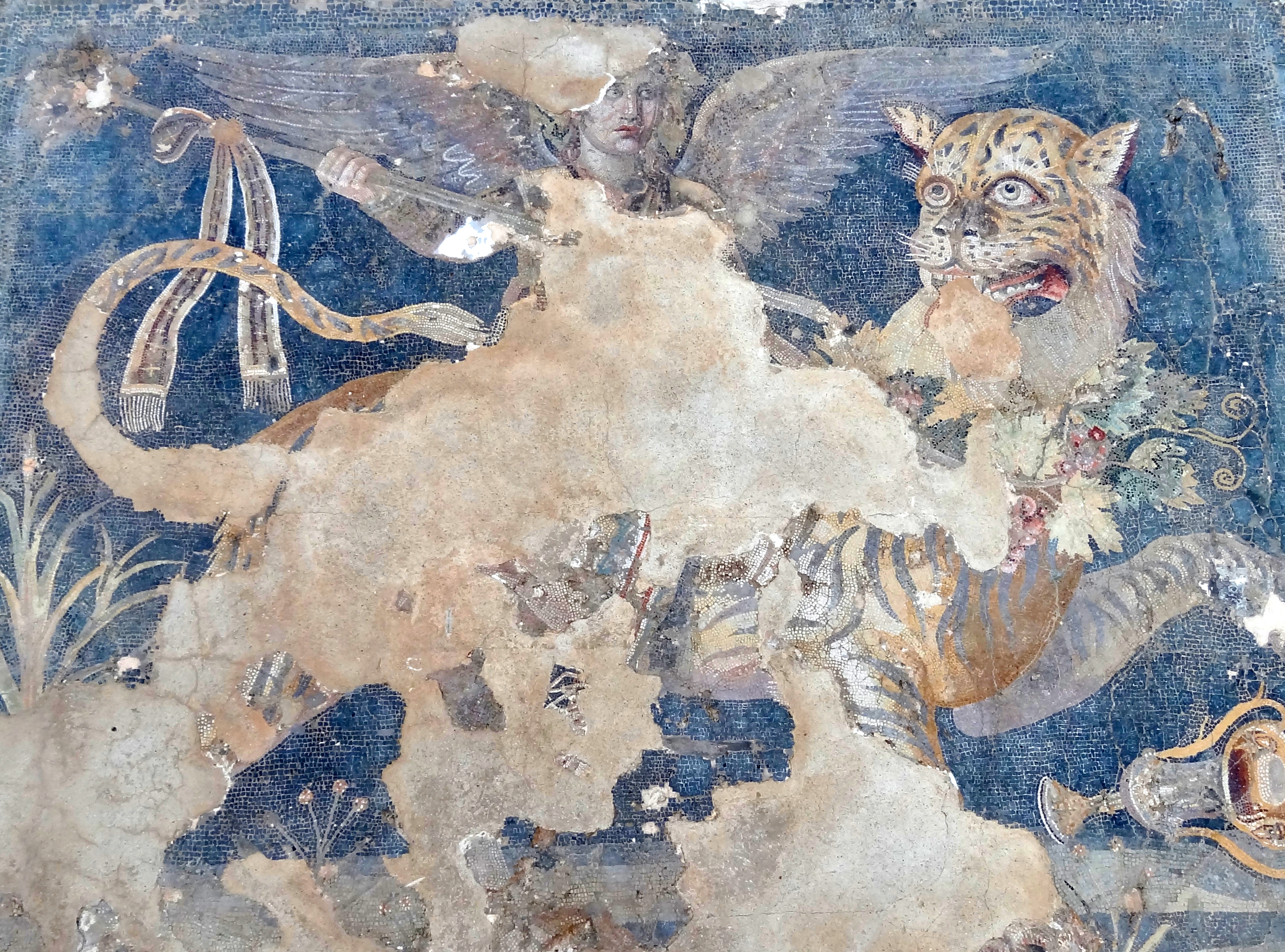
Mosaics of Delos (Hellenistic, late 2nd century BC, Archaeological Museum of Delos).

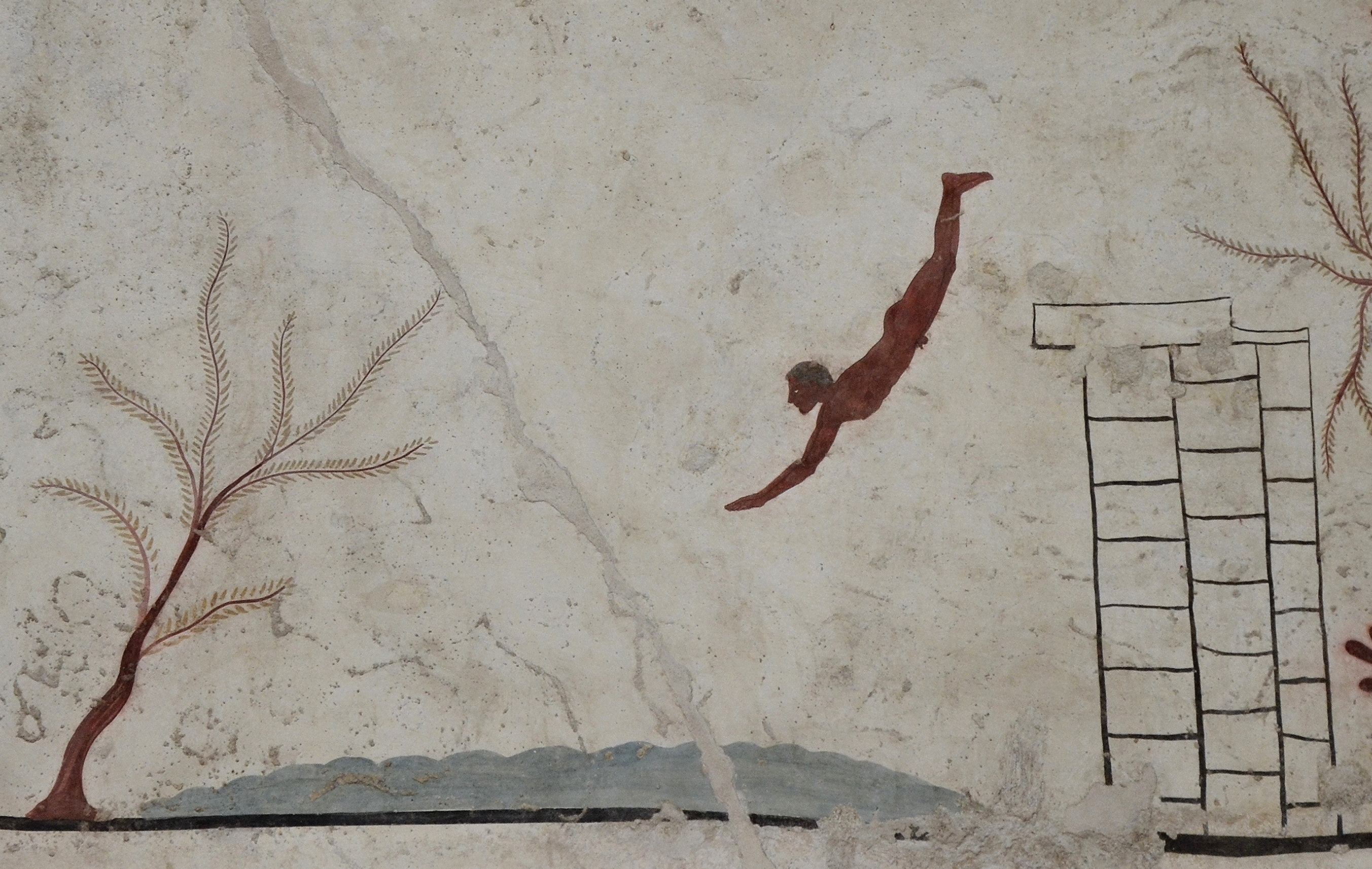
Underside top slab of Tomb of the Diver (Classical, c. 475 BC, National Archaeological Museum of Paestum).

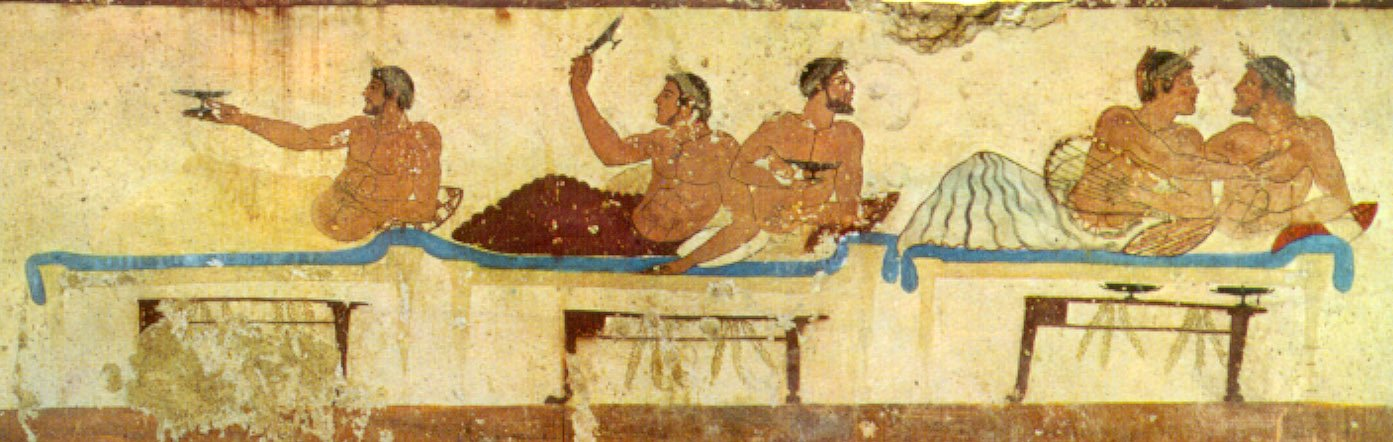
Symposium scene in the Tomb of the Diver (c. 475 BC, National Archaeological Museum of Paestum).

Greek panel painting of a woman, from Saqqara.(Classical, c. 420-380 BC, British Museum).

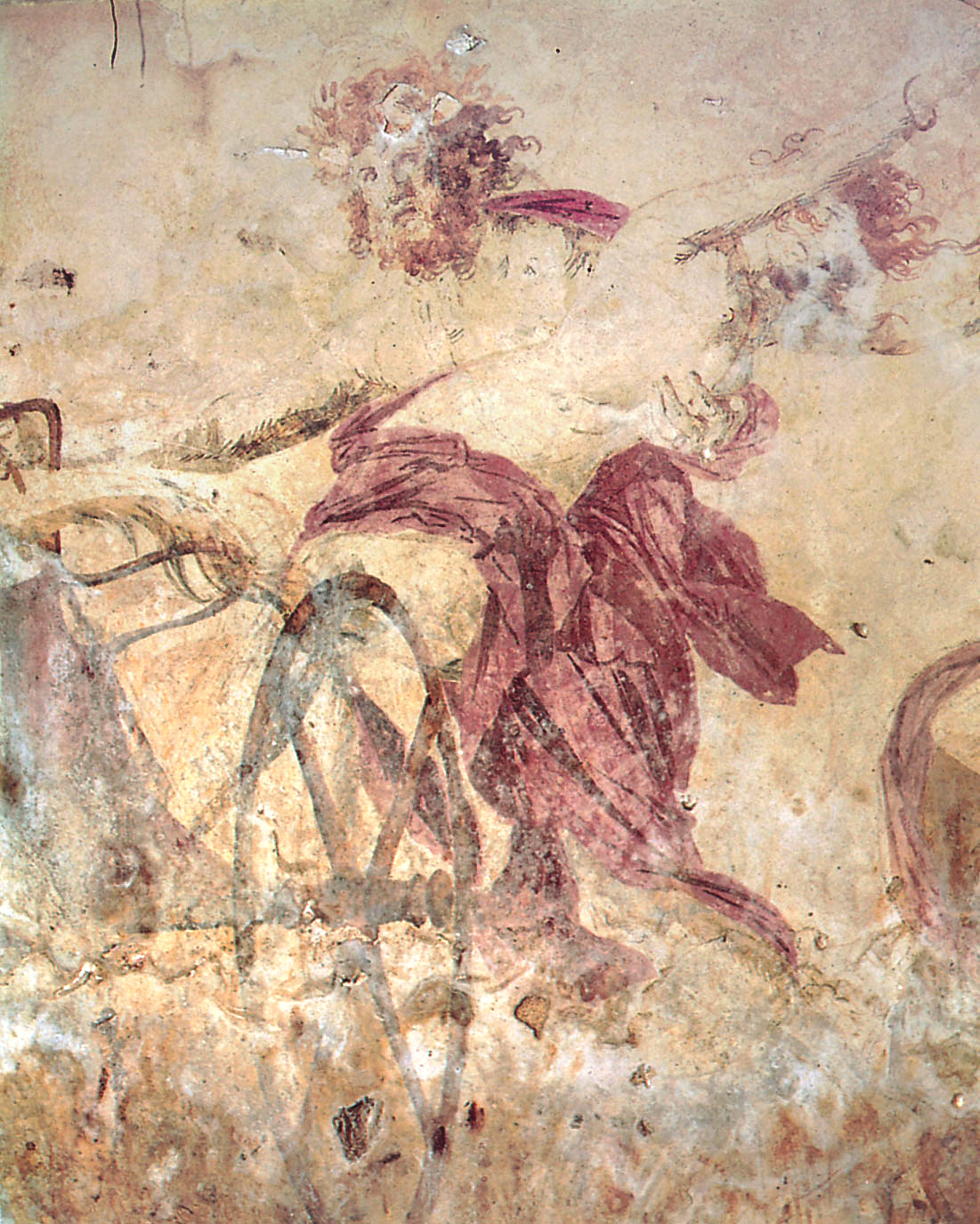
Detail of a fresco showing skiagraphia, Hades abducting Persephone, while riding in a chariot, from the tomb of Queen Eurydice I of Macedon at Vergina (Classical, c. 340 BC).

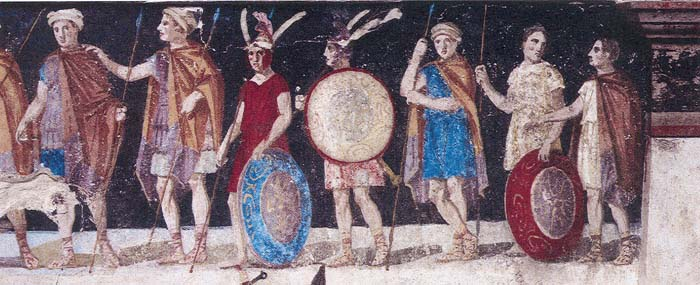
Mural of soldiers from tomb in Agios Athanasios, Thessaloniki, Ancient Macedonia (Hellenistic, 4th century BC).

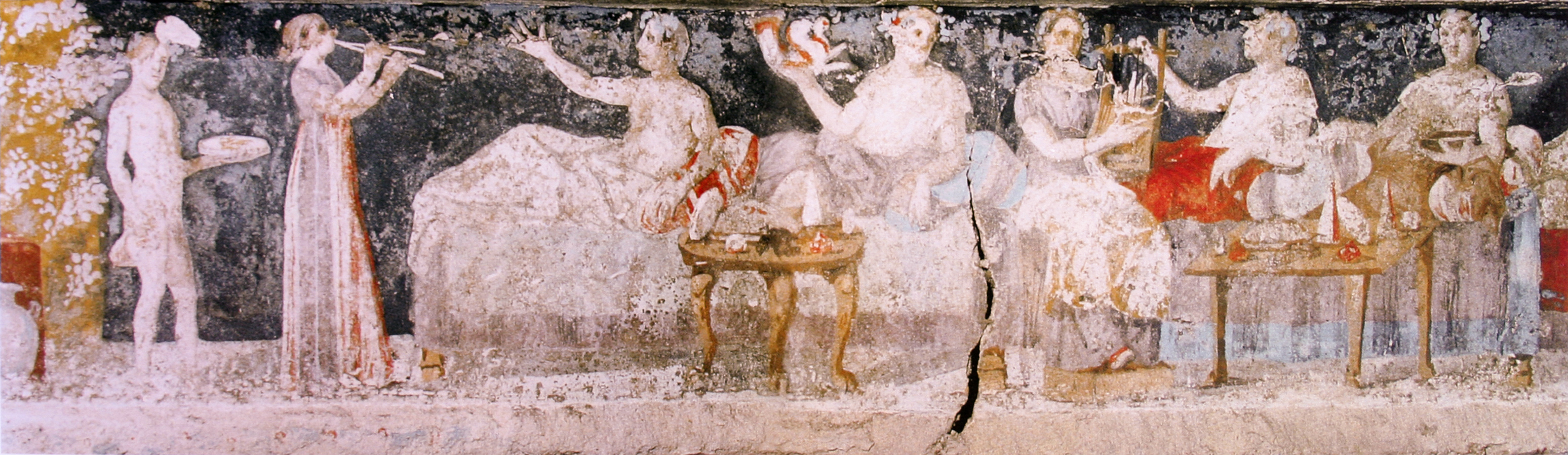
Banquet fresco detail from tomb in Agios Athanasios, Thessaloniki, Greece (Hellenistic, c. 325-300 BC).

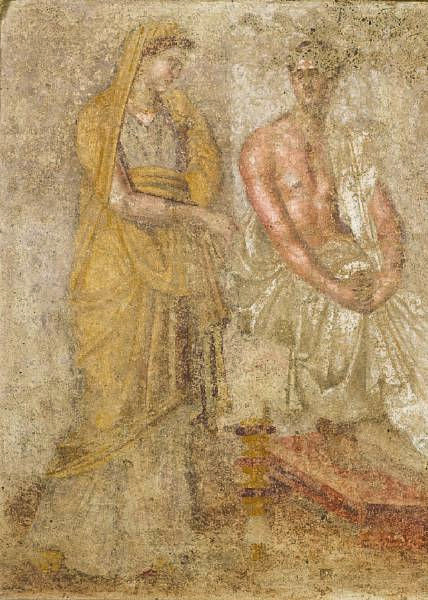
Terracotta funerary wall painting (Hellenistic, 3rd century BC).

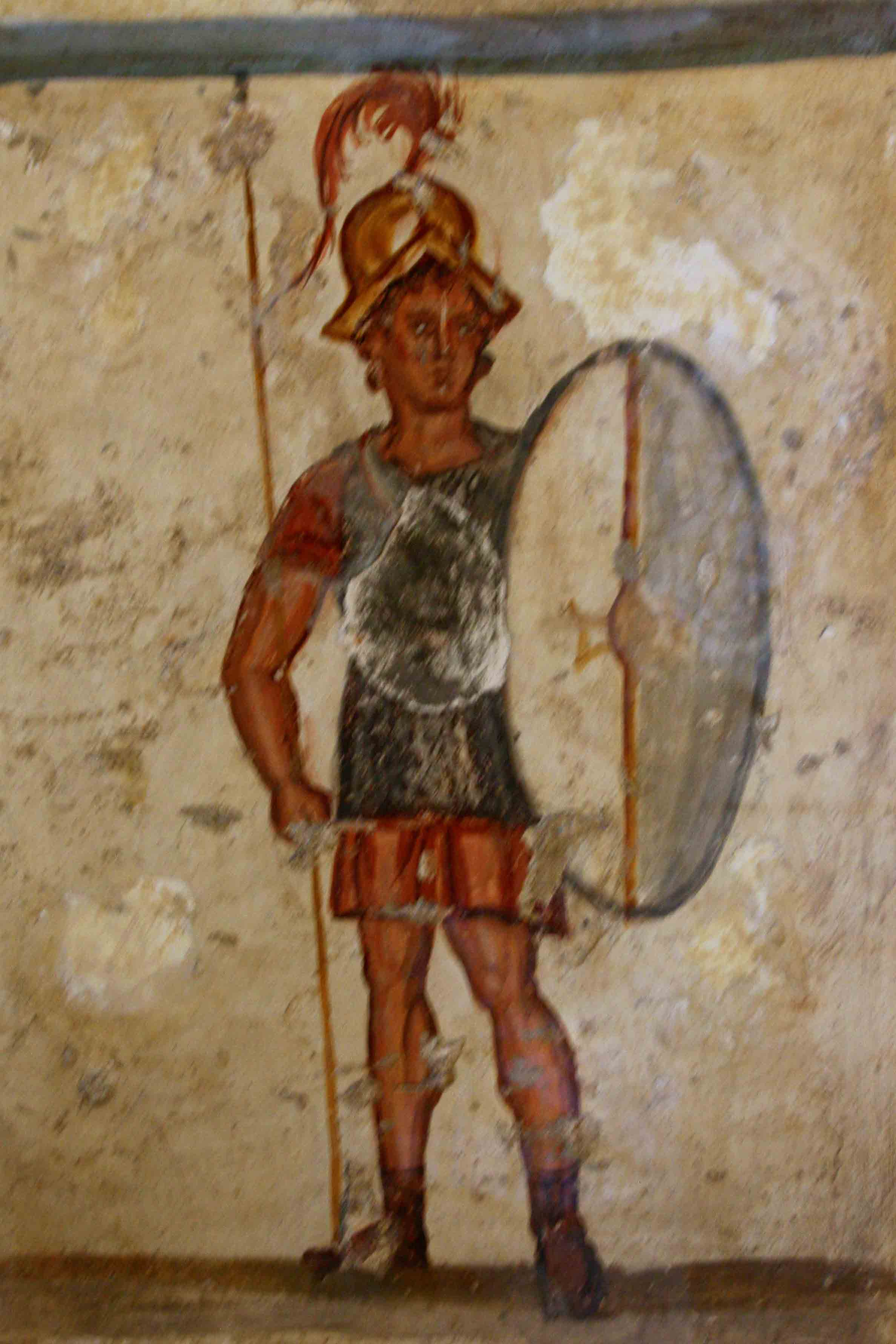
Fresco of an ancient Macedonian soldier (thorakitai) wearing chainmail armor and bearing a thureos shield (Hellenistic, 3rd century BC, Istanbul Archaeological Museums).

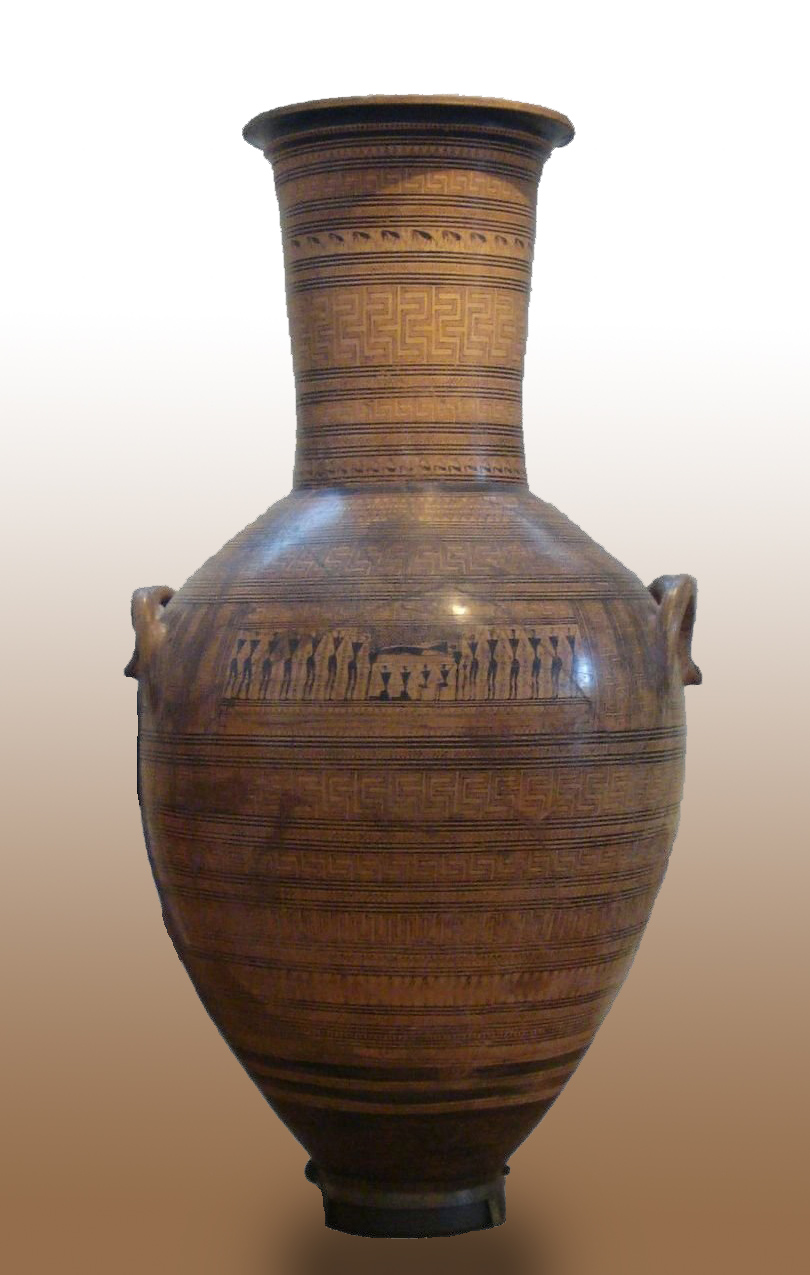
Geometric Dipylon Amphora, with funeral scene showing body lying in repose (Archaic, c. 750 BC, NAMA).

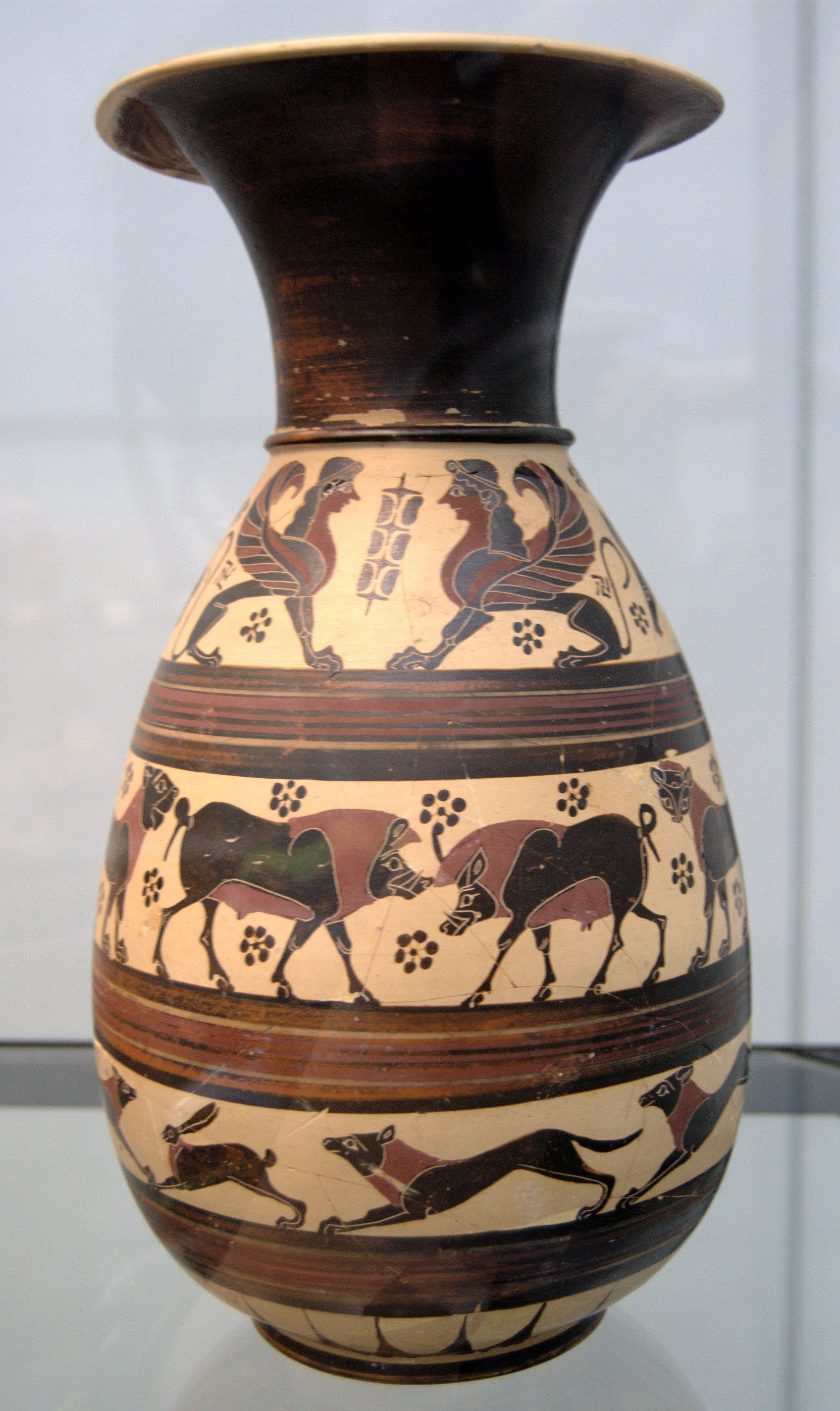
Orientalizing Corinthian olpe (Archaic, c. 620 BC, Staatliche Antikensammlungen).

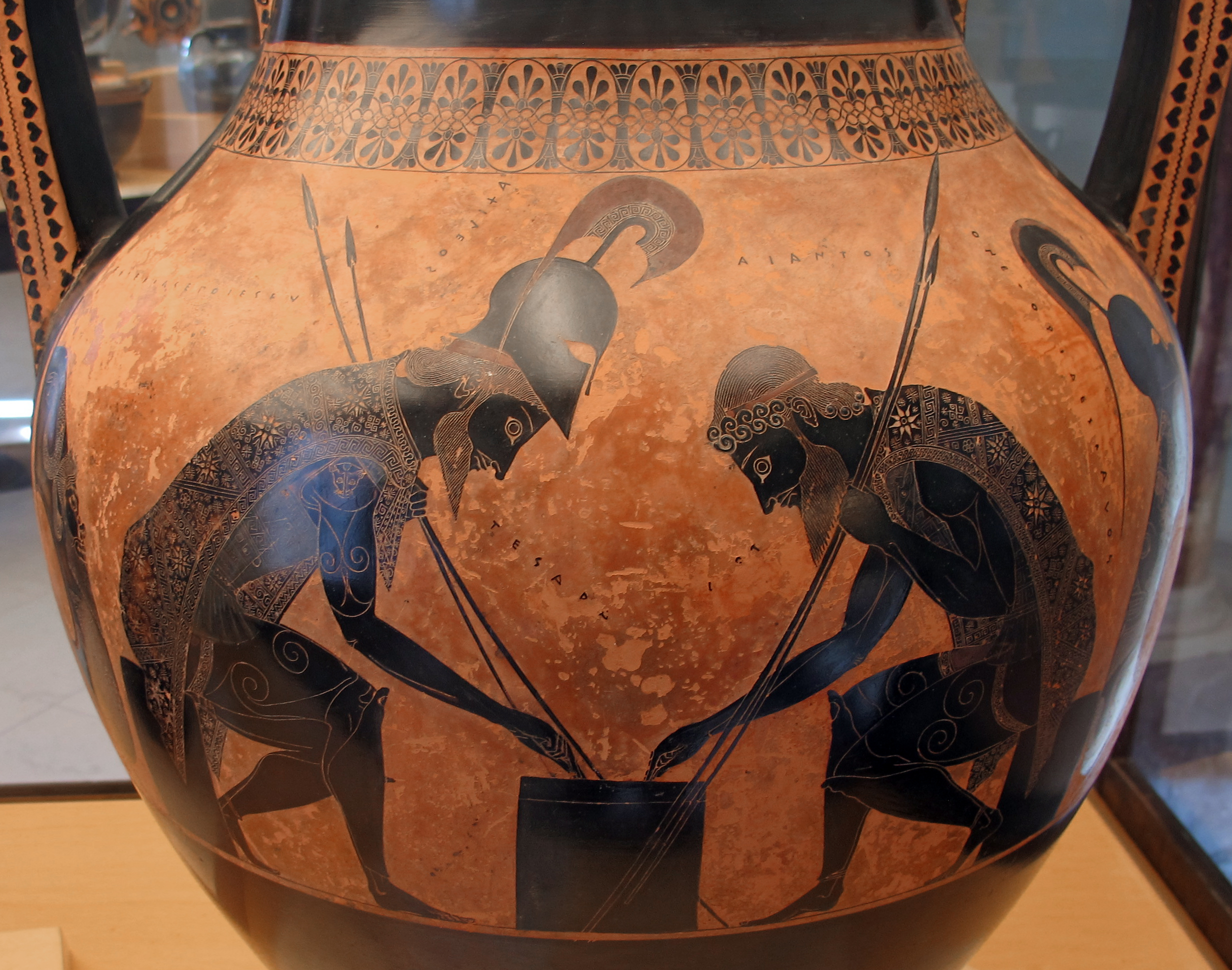
Black-figure Amphora by Exekias, Achilles and Ajax engaged in a game, (Archaic, c. 540–530 BC, Vatican Museums)

Black-figure amphora by the Amasis Painter, Dionysus, with two maenads offering him a hare (Archaic, c. 540 BC, BnF Museum).

Red-figure kylix by Douris, school scene, students learning music (Classical, c. 480 BC, Antikensammlung Berlin).

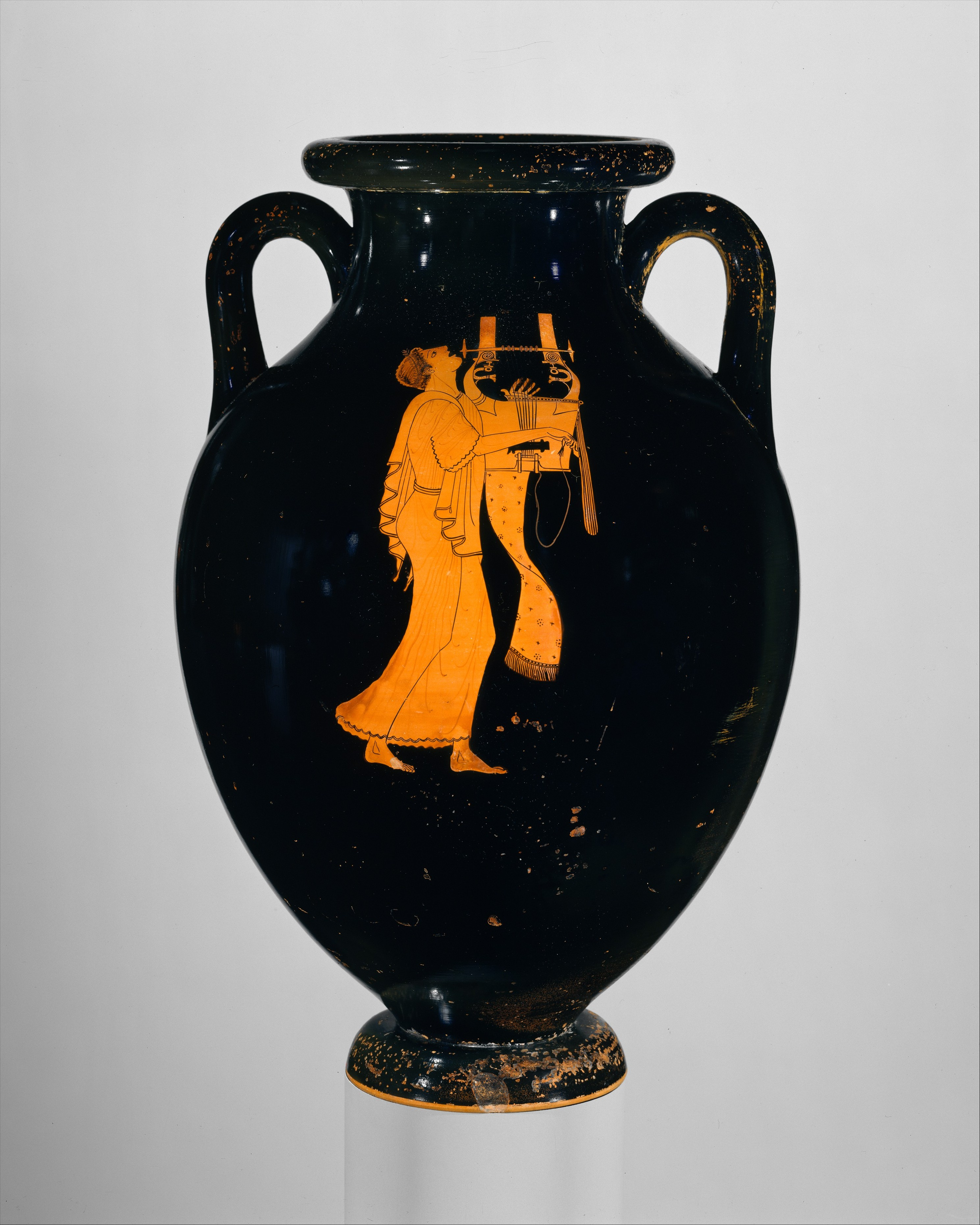
Red-figure amphora by Berlin Painter, musician singing and playing a kithara (Archaic, c. 490 BC, Metropolitan Museum of Art).

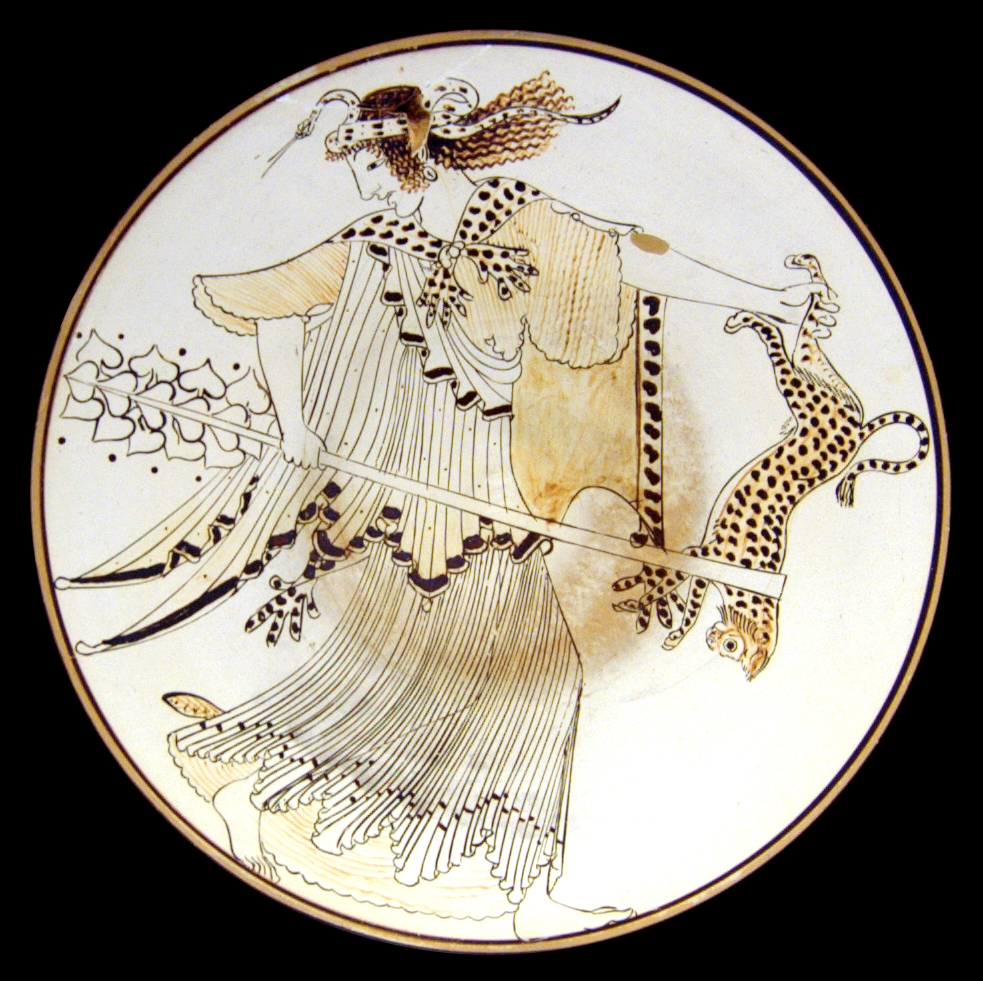
Tondo of a white-ground kylix, showing a raging maenad by the Brygos Painter. She holds a thyrsos in her right hand, her left is swinging a panther. A snake winds through the diadem in her hair (Archaic, c. 490-480 BC, Staatliche Antikensammlungen).

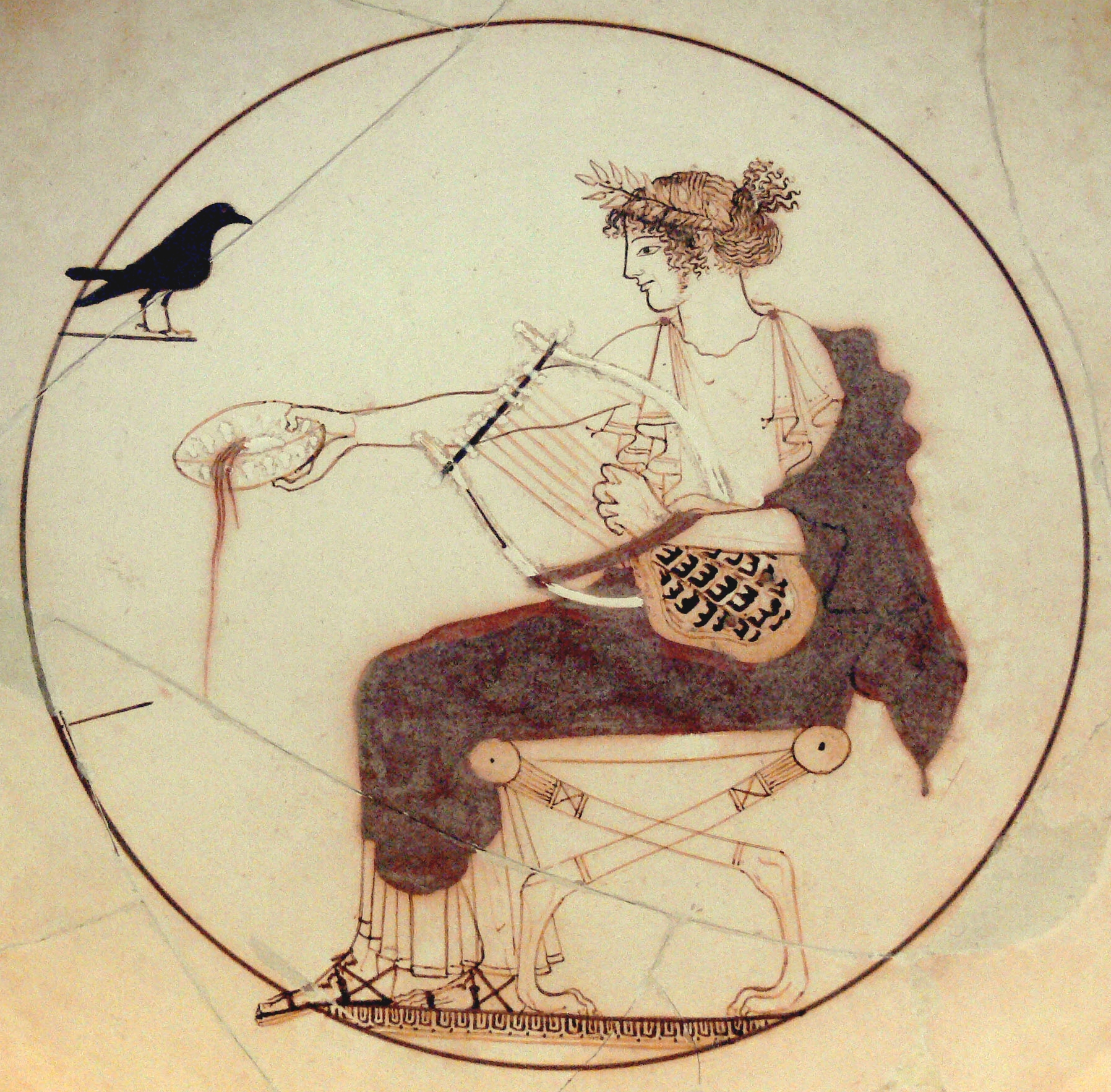
Tondo of White-ground Kylix of Apollo, Apollo seated with a chelys lyre and pouring libation (Classical, c. 460 BC, Archaeological Museum of Delphi).

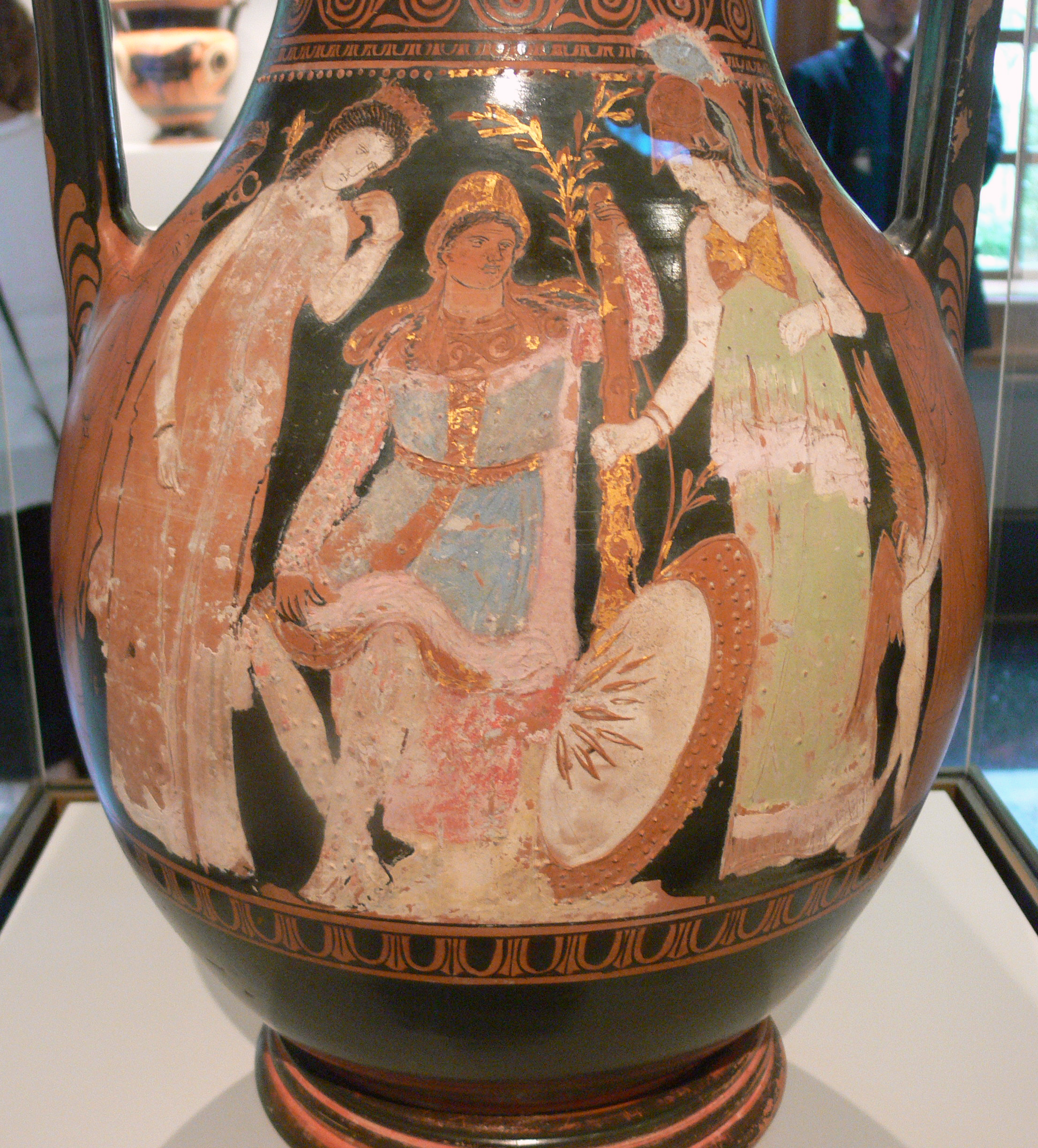
Red-figure Kerch style pelike, Judgement of Paris, Painter of the Wedding Procession (Classical, c. 360 BC, Getty Museum).

After the Greek Dark Ages and legendary Dorian invasion, Greek painters in classical antiquity made remarkable contributions, including innovations in perspective derived from scenography, contrasting with the mixed perspective of Egyptian and Minoan painting — faces and legs presented in profile, while eyes and torsos appear frontally.

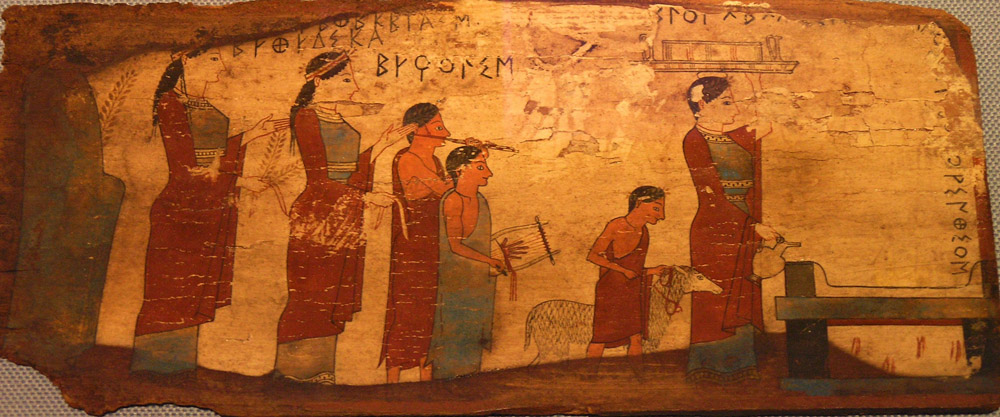
Pitsa panels, the only surviving Ancient Greek panel paintings from Greece proper (Archaic, c. 540–530 BC, NAMA). They are votive tablets or pinax.

Ancient Greek art is divided into Archaic (c. 800–480 BC), Classical (c. 480–323 BC), and Hellenistic (c. 323–30 AD). Their painting includes polychromy on pagan temples, sculpture, and figurines; plus wall, panel, and vase painting, on pottery and ceramics, giving glimpses of ancient Greek society, classified by scholars such as Adolf Furtwängler (1853–1907) into styles geometric, orientalizing, black-figure, red-figure, and white-ground. Mosaics also provide insight into ancient painting.

Most ancient Greek painters are known only from texts. Only few examples of wall paintings survive, such as those preserved in tombs and funerary art. Only a single example of ancient Greek panel painting from Greece proper survives. (Note: A few others come from Egypt.)

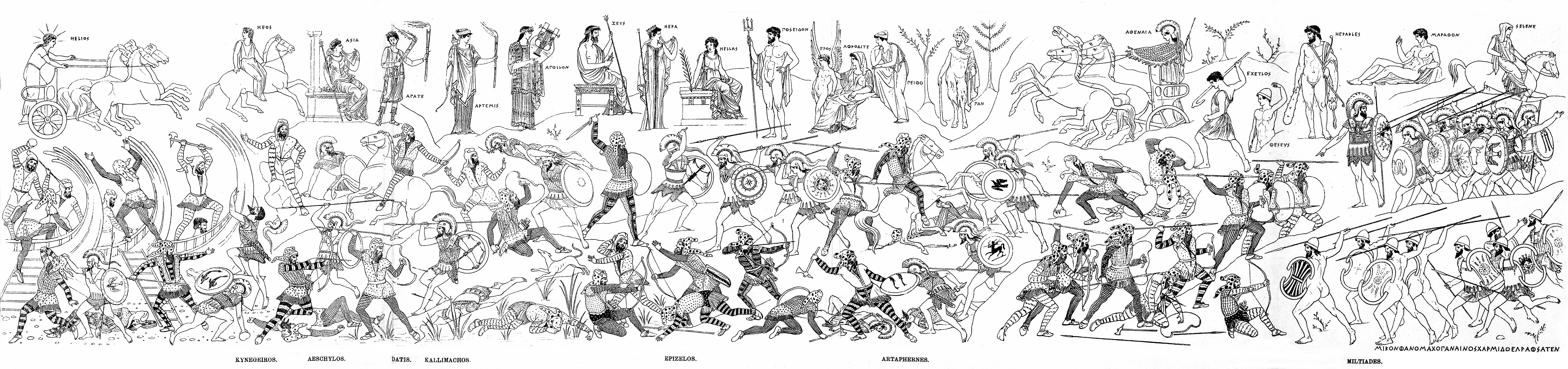
Reconstruction of Battle of Marathon (490 BC) painting from the Stoa Poikile (Classical, c. 460 BC), by Carl Robert (1850-1922).

The Stoic philosophers's namesake was the Stoa Poikile (painted portico, c. 460 BC) in the Ancient Agora of Athens, painted with battle scenes, attributed to either Micon, Panaenus, or Polygnotus.

Micon's daughter was Timarete. According to Plutarch (50–121 AD), Polygnotos regularly painted for free, and was the paramour of Elpinice (c. 510-450 BC), daughter of Battle of Marathon (490 BC) victor Miltiades (c. 550–489 BC). Polygnotos was more a draughtsman than the following colorist generation.

Skiagraphia innovator Apollodorus (fl. 5th century BC) influenced Zeuxis, who improved upon his advances. According to Cicero (106 BC–43 BC), when Zeuxis found no woman beautiful enough to pose as Helen of Troy, he combined the finest features of five Crotonian models. According to Pliny the Elder (c. 24–79 AD), birds once pecked at Zeuxis's painted grapes. Parrhasius in turn painted a curtain, which Zeuxis asked to be lifted to see the image, only to discover it was the image.

Obverse side, gathering around Heracles, crowned with laurel wreath, wearing the lion-skin and holding a club and bow.

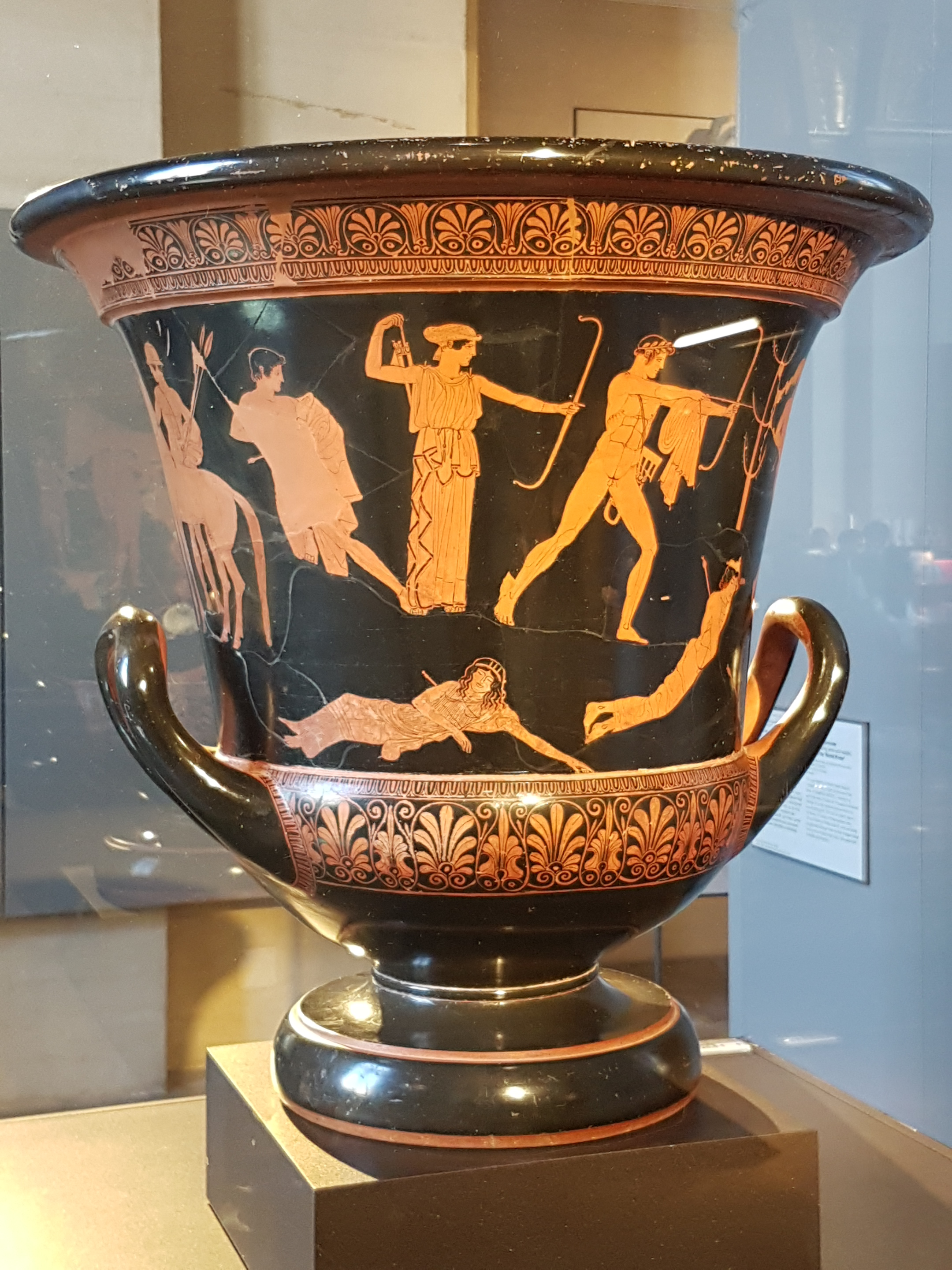
Reverse side, massacre of the Niobids by Artemis and Apollo

Red-figure Niobid Krater, showing intricate perspective and poses, name vase of Niobid Painter (Classical, c. 460 BC, Louvre).

The painter Pamphilus taught Apelles (fl. 4th century BC), described as antiquity's greatest painter, noted especially for charis (charm, grace). Pyrrhonist philosopher Sextus Empiricus (fl. 2nd century AD) likened ataraxia to Apelles's attempt to paint a horse foaming at the mouth. Apelles gave up, angrily tossing the sponge used to clean his brushes; and its mark on the painting produced the desired effect of foam.

Aristides of Thebes (fl. 4th century BC) taught rapid painter Nicomachus of Thebes. Philoxenus of Eretria was Nicomachus's disciple.

More examples of ancient Greek vase painting survive, including artists such as Exekias (fl. 545–530 BC), Douris (fl. 500–460 BC), and several unidentified artists given "notnames" by scholars such as John Beazley (1885–1970) and Arthur Dale Trendall (1909–1995), like the Amasis Painter (fl. 550–510 BC), Berlin Painter (fl. 490–460 BC), Brygos Painter (fl. 490–470 BC), Niobid Painter (fl. 470–450 BC), and Painter of the Wedding Procession (fl. 4th century BC).

==== Etruscans ====
Image Gallery (Click "Show" to view)
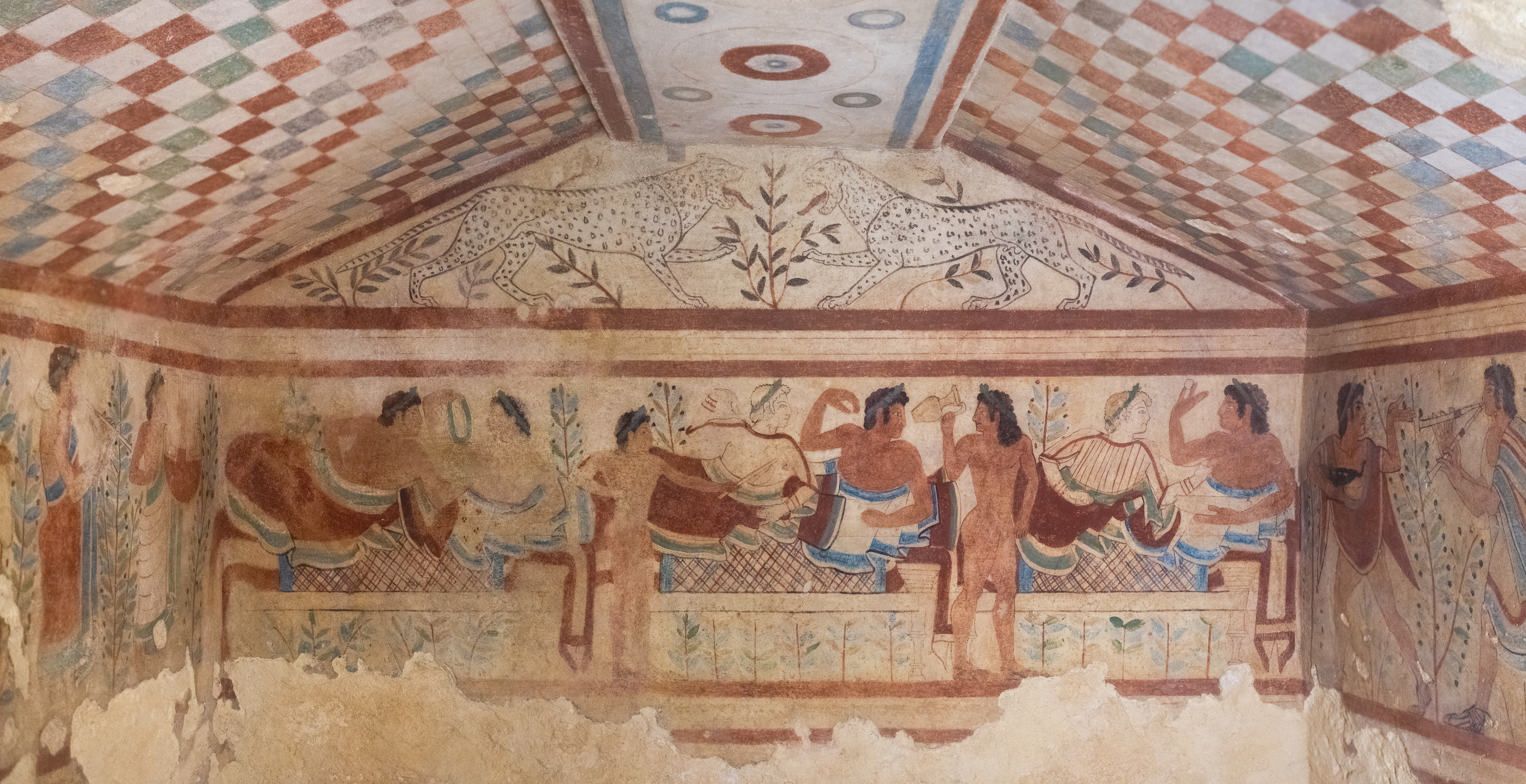
Tomb of the Leopards (c. 460 BC), from Monterozzi necropolis.

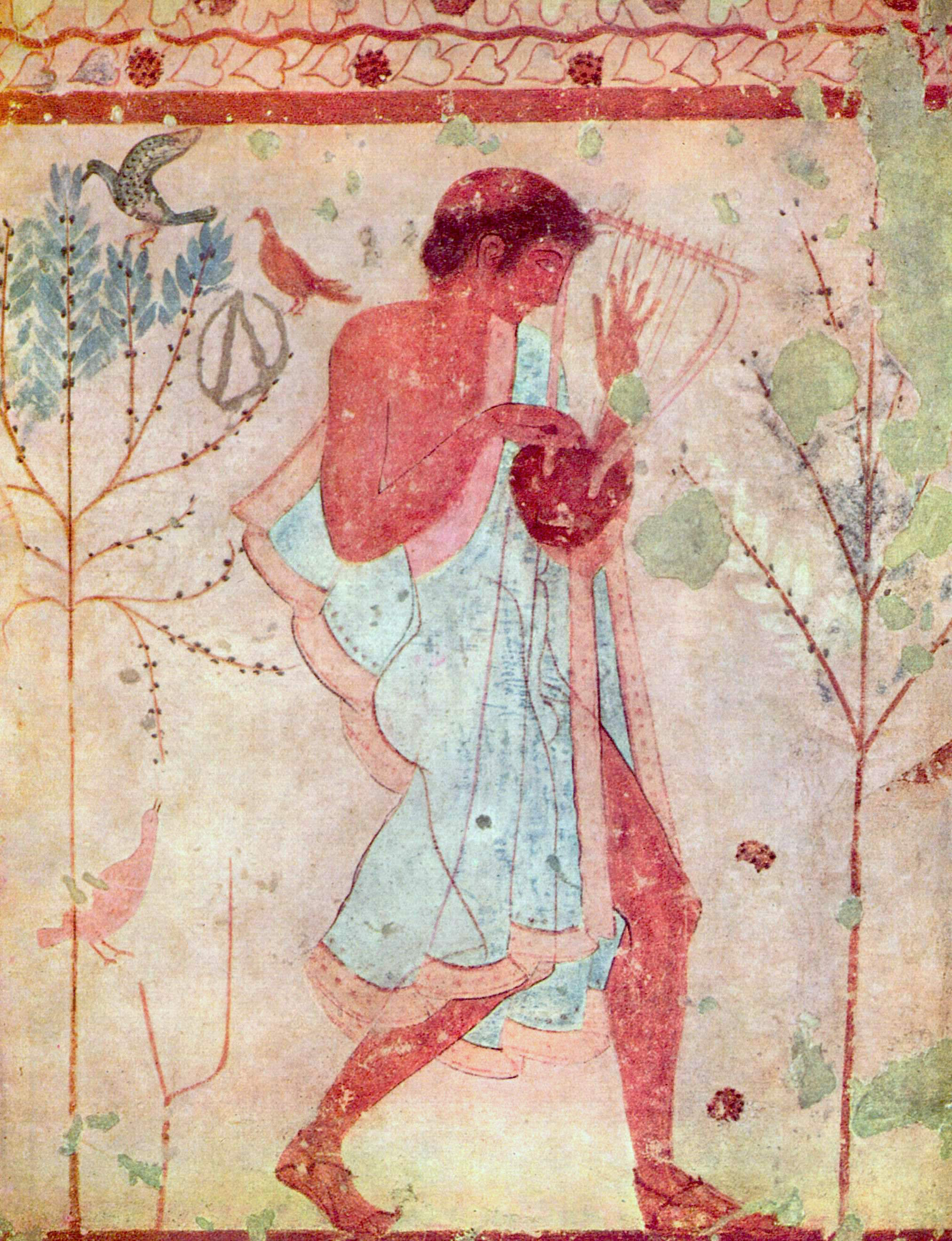
Fresco of an Etruscan musician with a barbiton (c. 470 BC), from Tomb of the Triclinium.

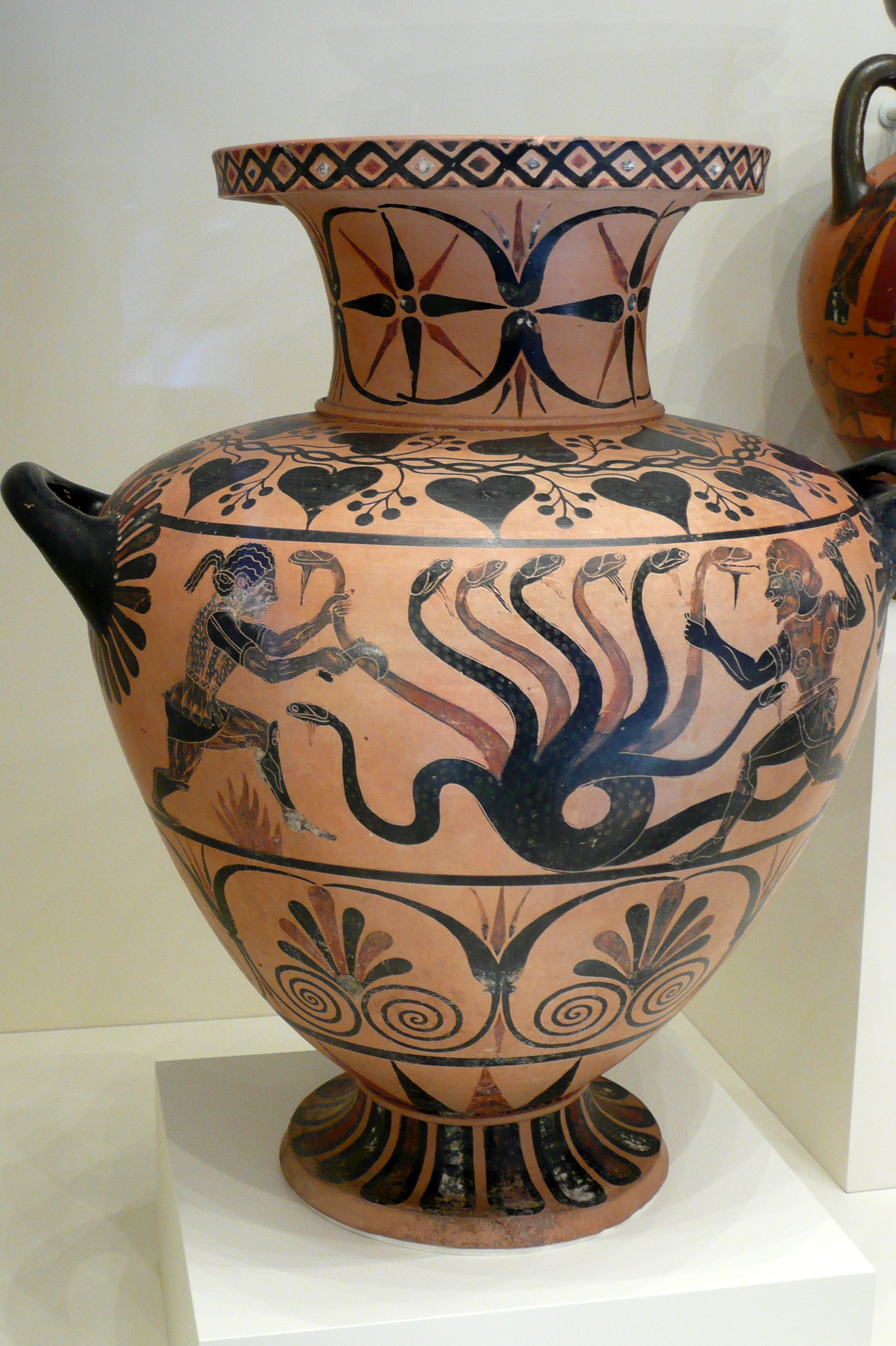
Caeretan Hydria with Herakles and the Hydra. (c. 525 BC, Getty Museum)

The Etruscans were heavily influenced by the Greeks, painting colorful polychromy, wall, and vase paintings. Almost all surviving Etruscan wall paintings are in tombs, mainly located in Tarquinia.

==== Ancient Rome ====
Image Gallery (Click "Show" to view)
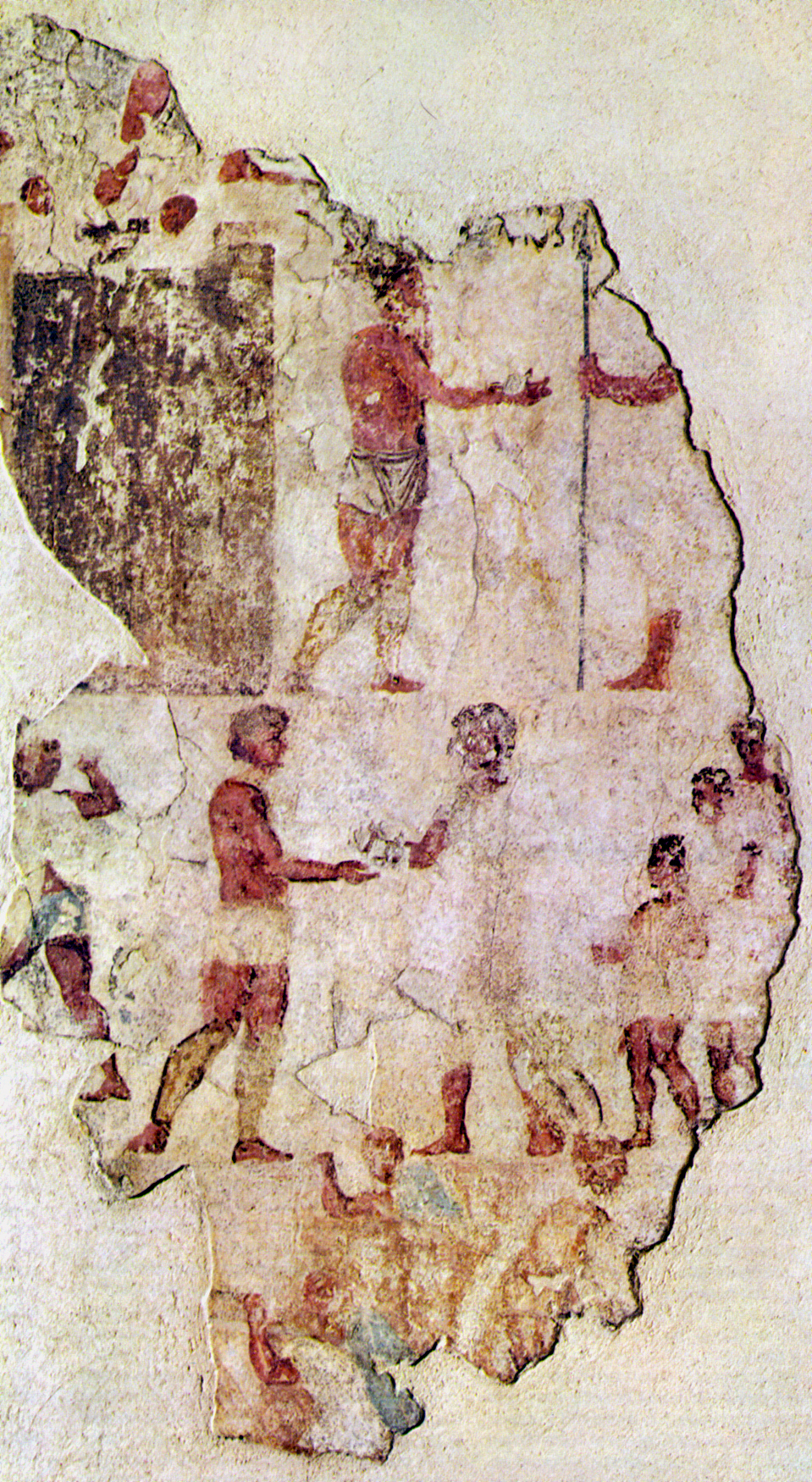
Fresco from the Tomb of the Fabii (Hellenistic, c. 300–280 B.C., Capitoline Museums), Esquiline Necropolis. They are possibly depicting Quintus Fabius Maximus Rullianus in scenes from the Second Samnite War.

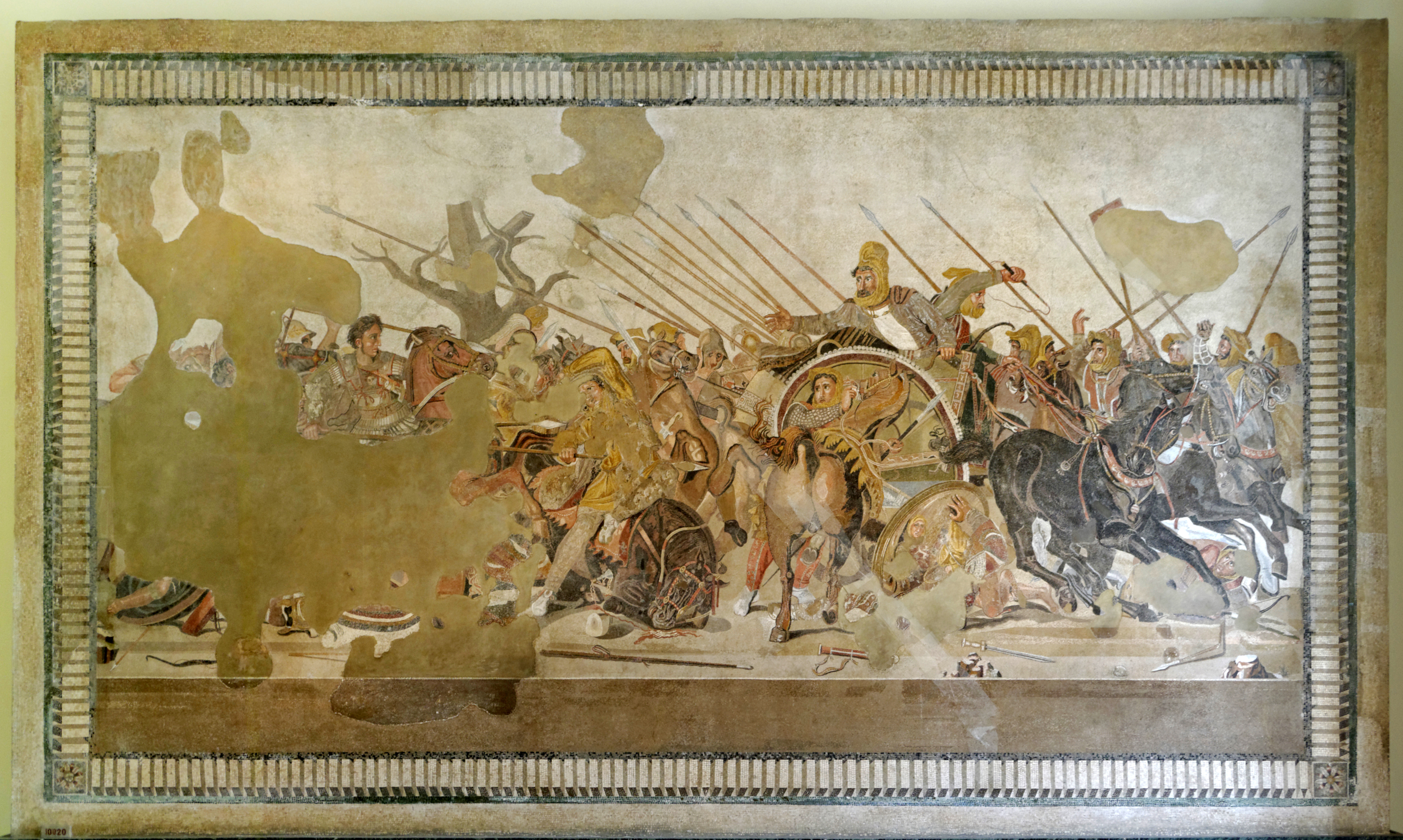
Alexander Mosaic, depicting the Battle of Issus (333 BC) between Alexander the Great (356 BC–323 BC) and Darius III (c. 380 BC–330 BC), an Opus vermiculatum mosaic and possibly a reproduction of a painting by Philoxenus of Eretria. Pompeii, House of the Faun. (Hellenistic, c. 120–100 BC, MANN)

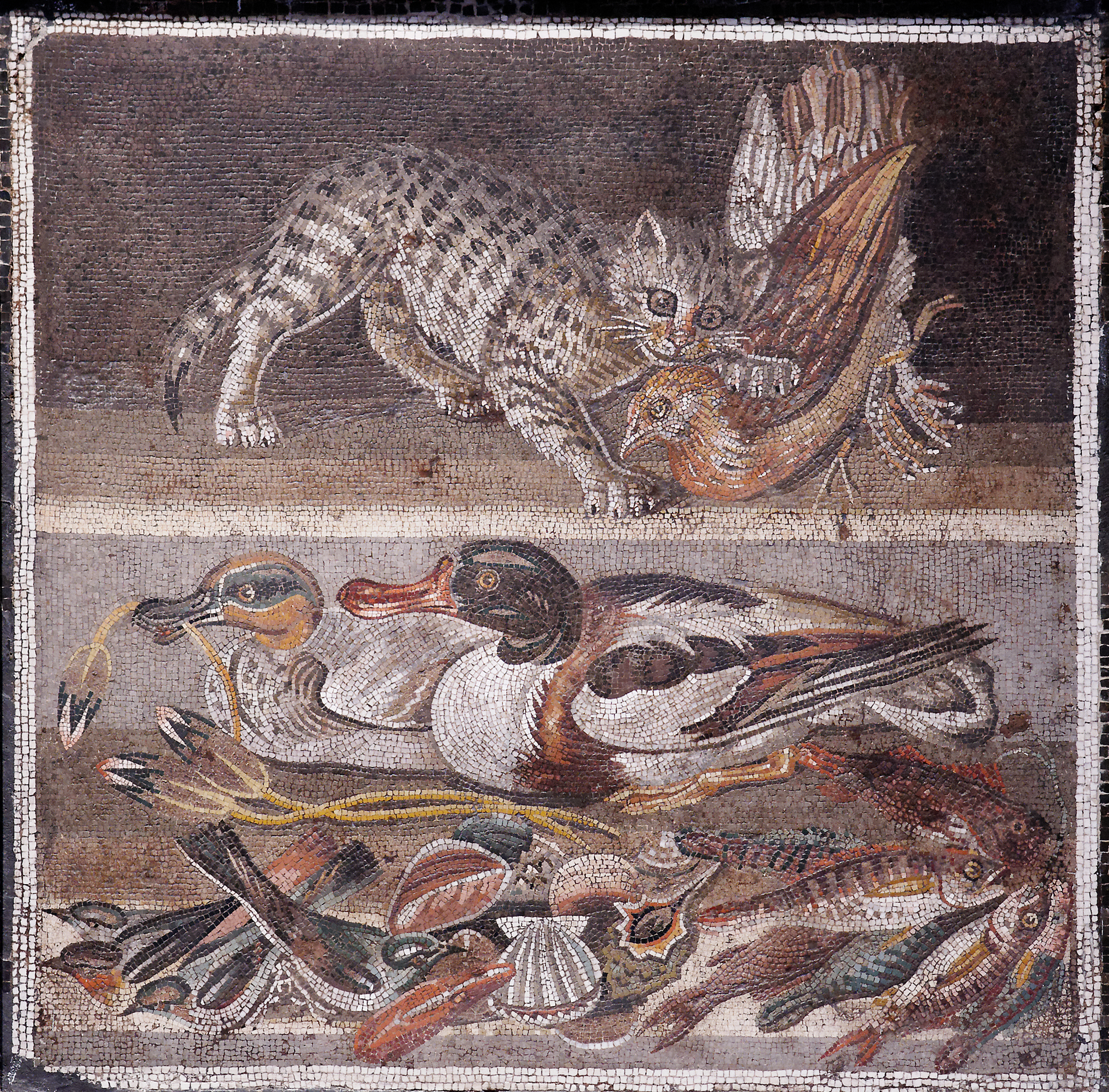
Still life xenia mosaic, Pompeii, House of the Faun (Hellenistic, c. 120–100 BC, MANN)

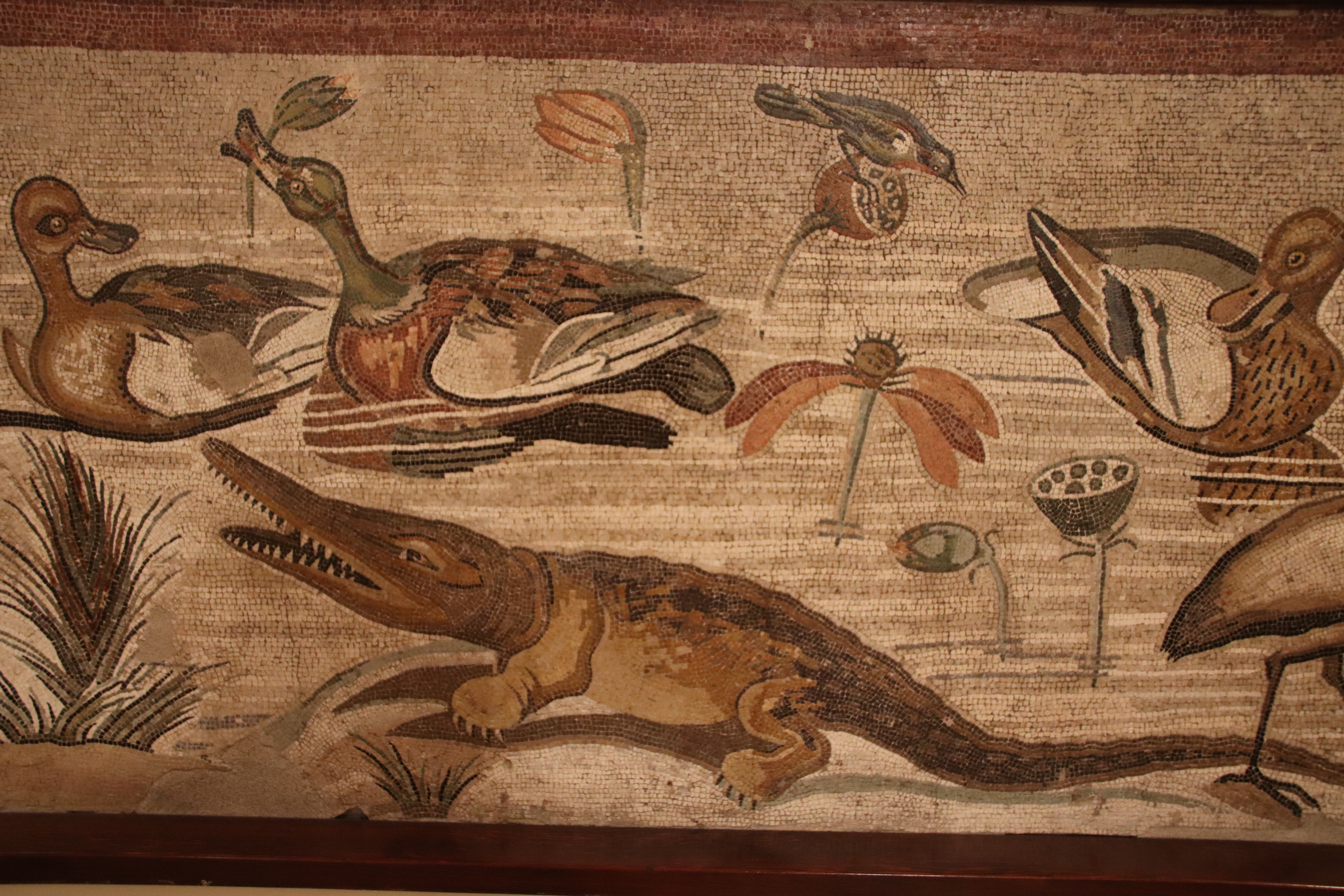
Nile River mosaic landscape, Pompeii, House of the Faun (Hellenistic, c. 120–100 BC, MANN)

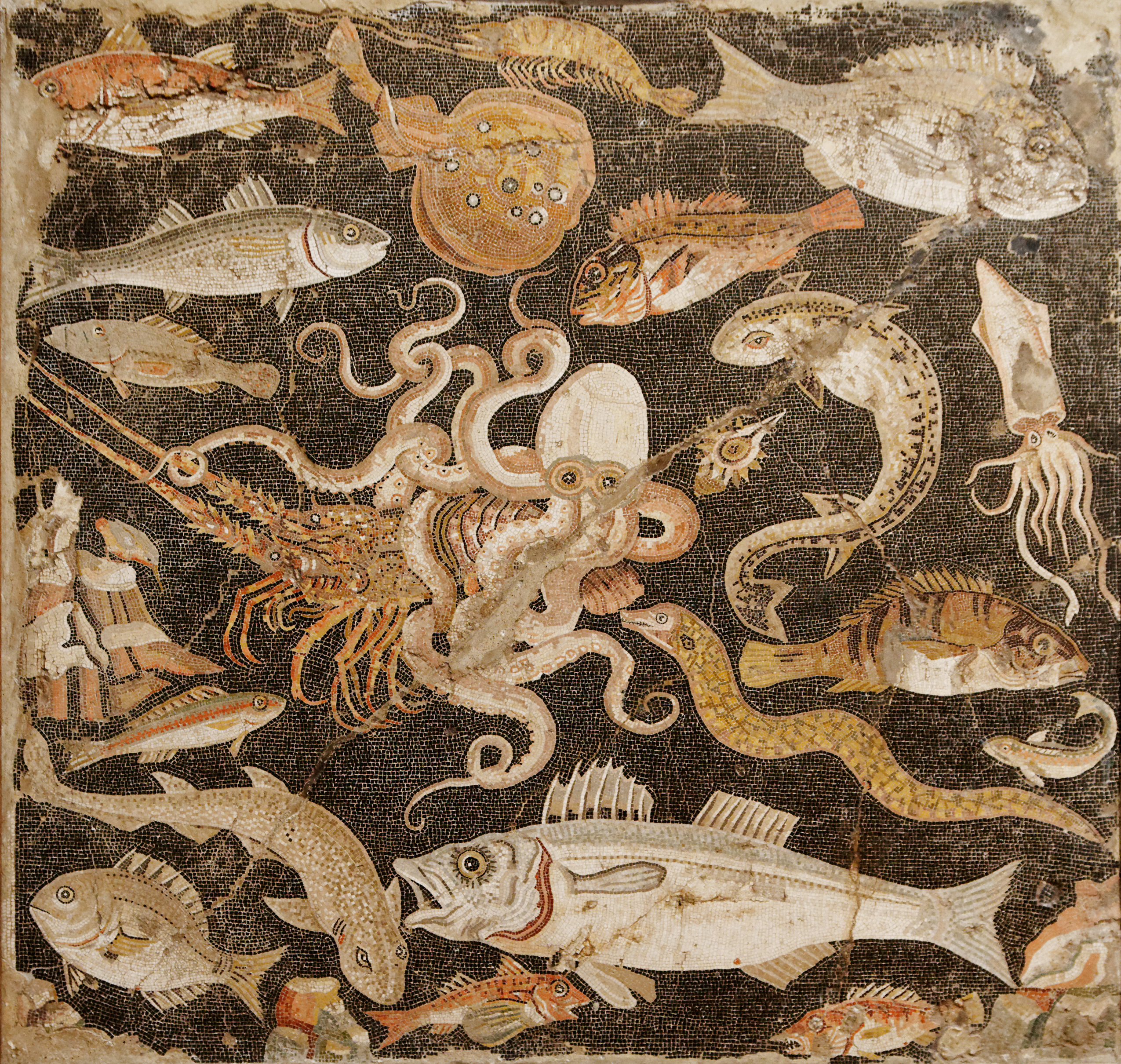
Marine mosaic from House of the Geometric Mosaics (Hellenistic, c. 100 BC, MANN)

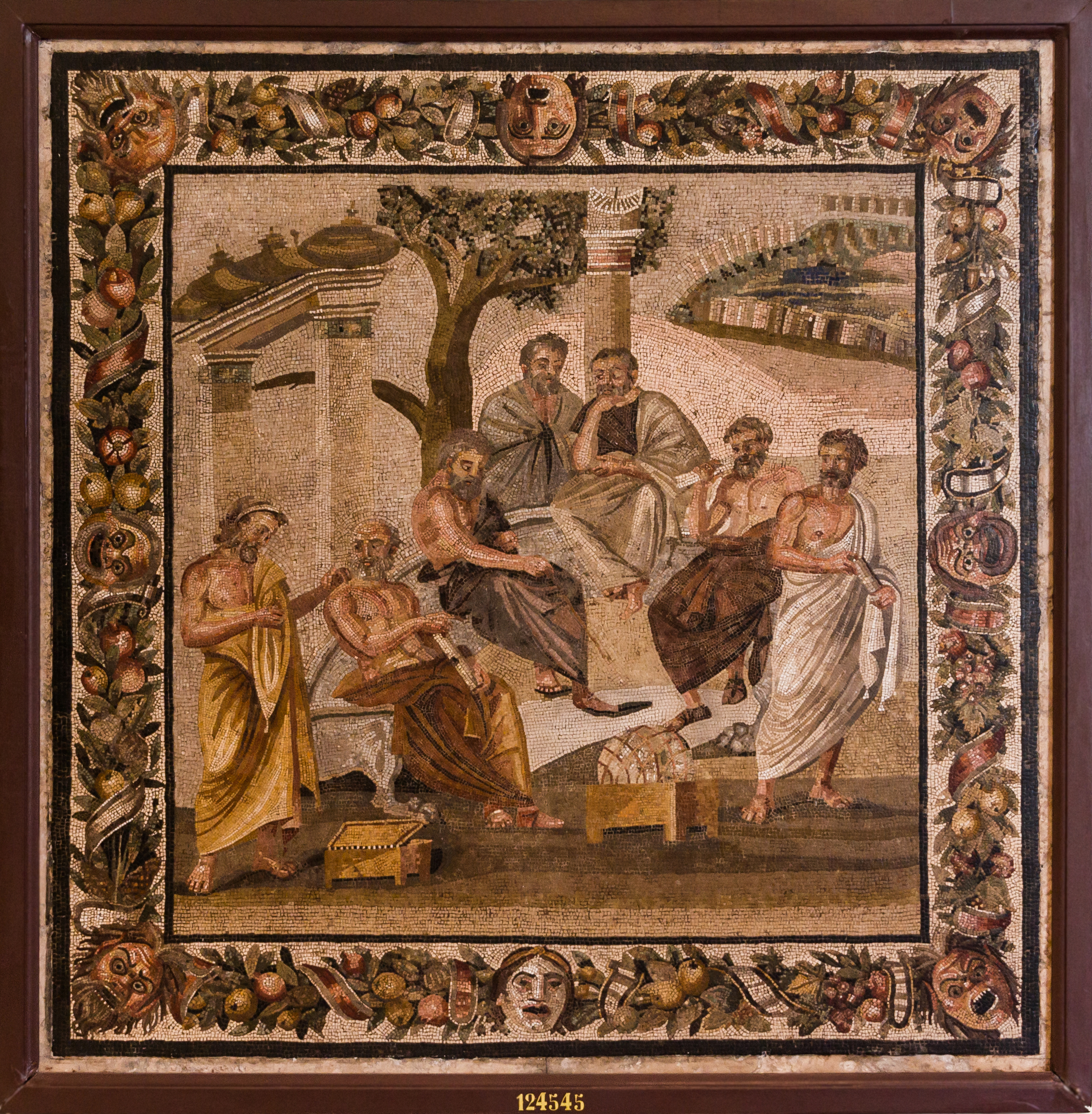
Plato's Academy mosaic. Pompeii, villa of T. Siminius Stephanus, near the city gates. (Hellenistic, c. 100 BC–79 AD, MANN)

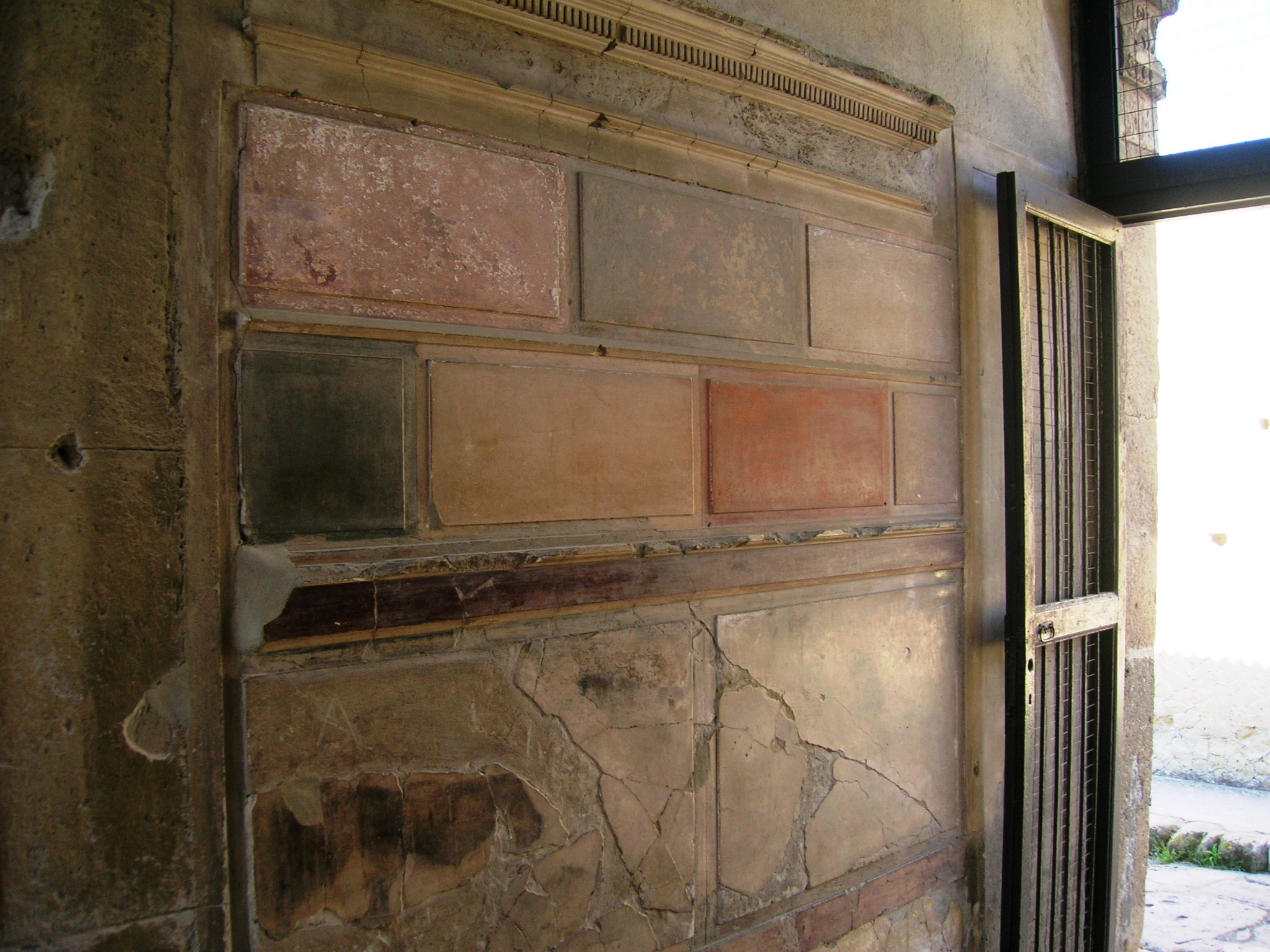
Fresco of painted blocks to appear like marble orthostates. Herculaneum, Samnite House. (First style, 120–100 BC, in situ)

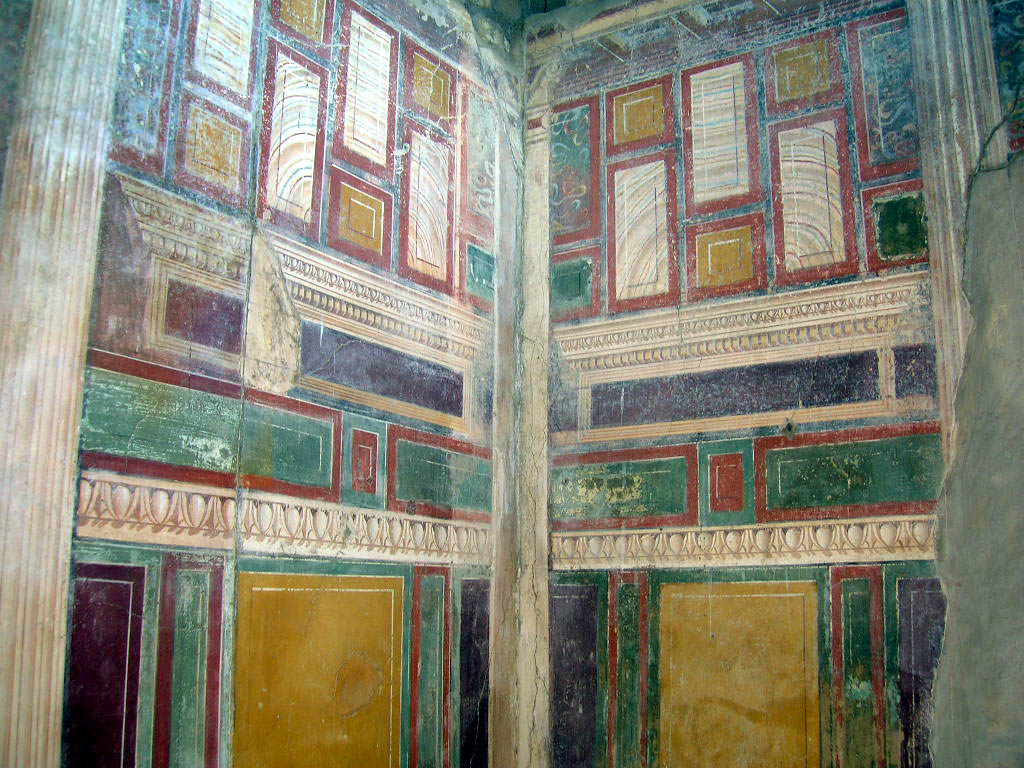
Mural detail. Stabiae (modern Castellammare di Stabia), Villa Arianna. (Late First or Second style, 1st century BC, in situ).

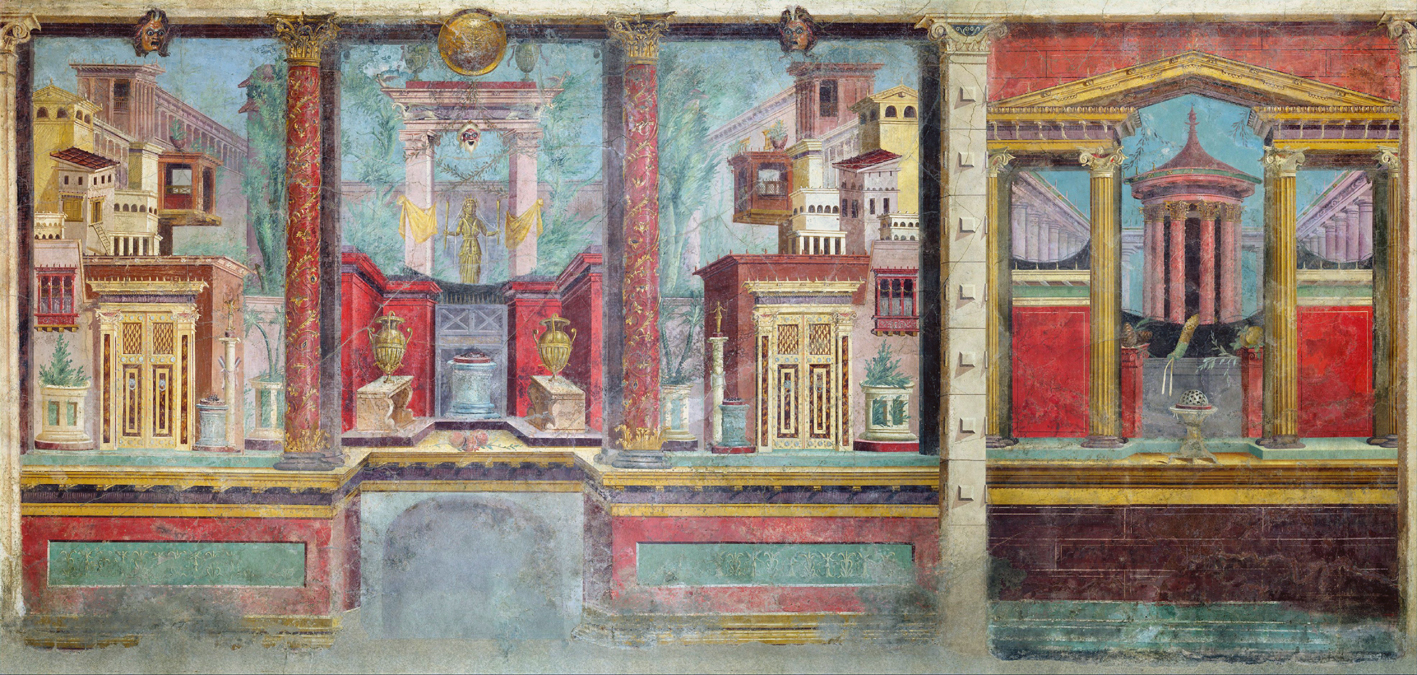
Villa Boscoreale, House of Publius Fannius Synistor, Cubiculum (bedroom). (Second style, 40 BC, Metropolitan Museum of Art)

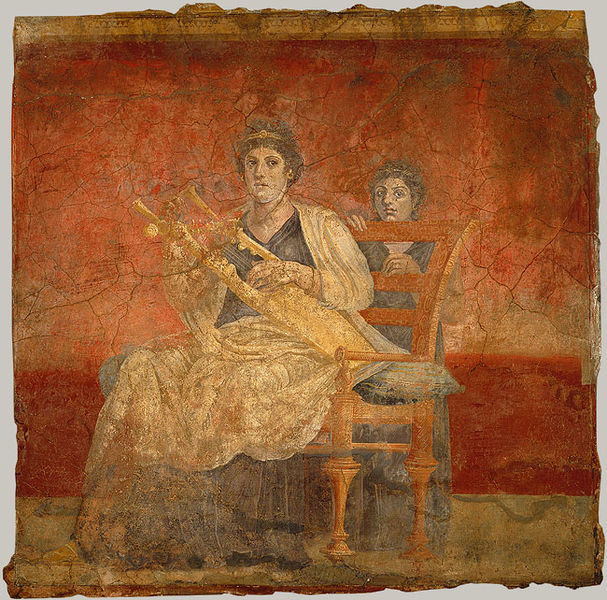
Fresco of a lady kithara player. Villa Boscoreale. (Second style, c. 40 BC, Metropolitan Museum of Art)

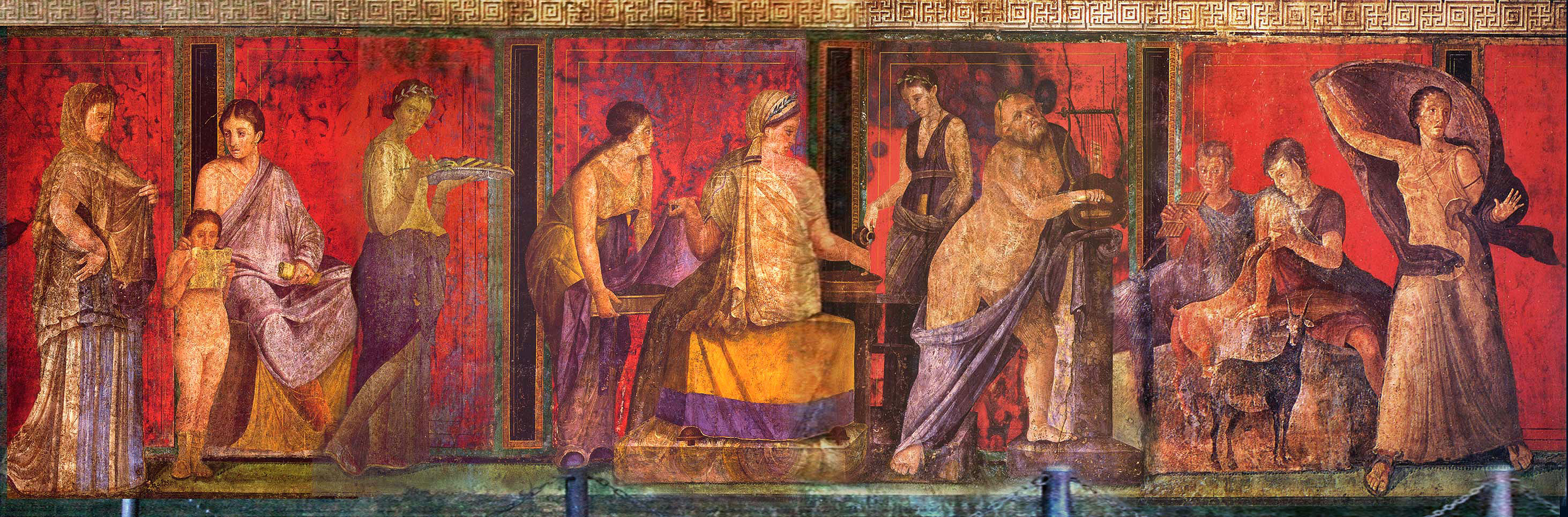
Initiation into the Dionysian Mysteries, Pompeii, Villa of the Mysteries. (Second style, c. 50 BC, in situ)

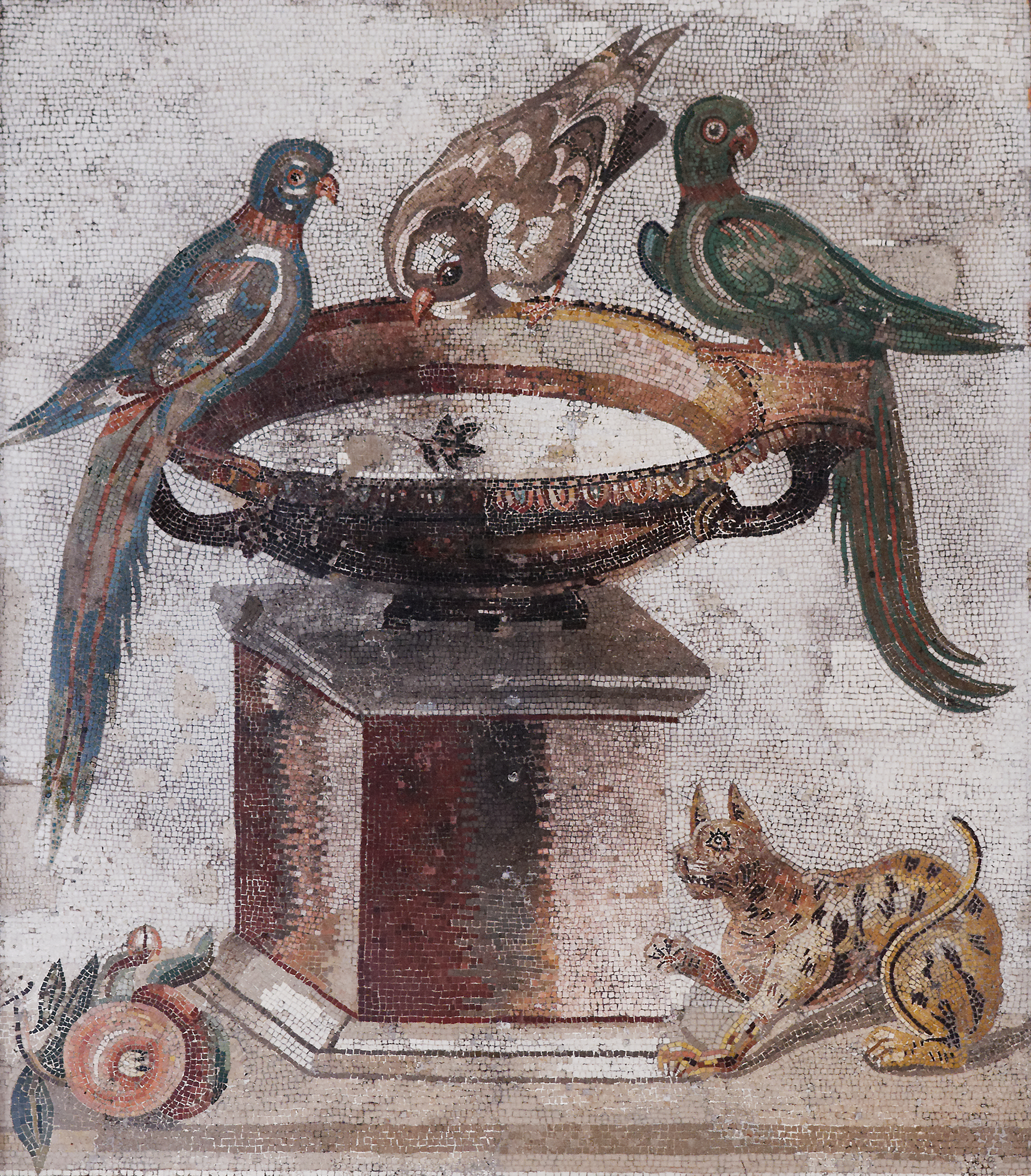
Mosaic of birds drinking from Santa Maria Capua Vetere. (Second style, c. 70 BC, MANN)

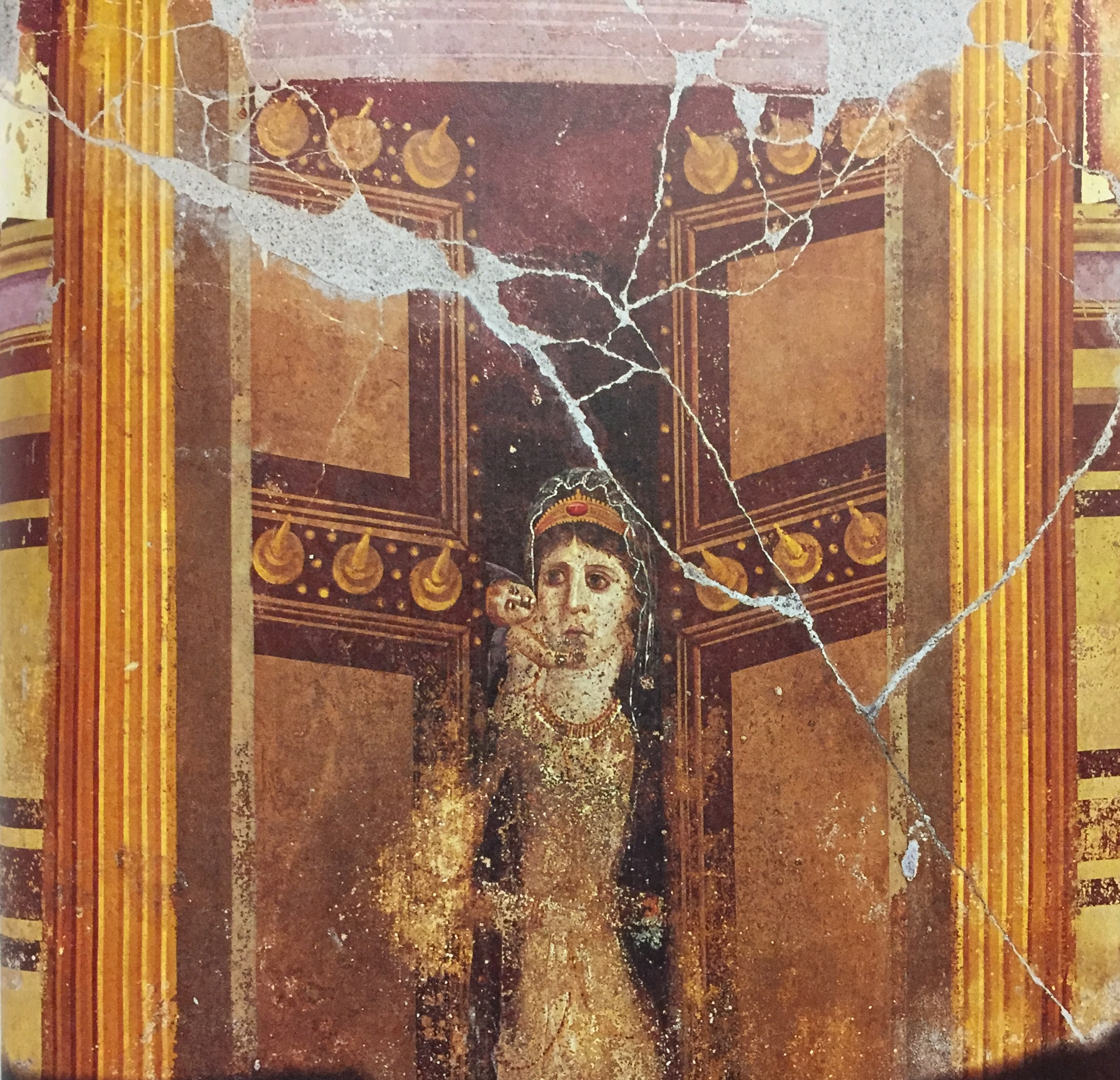
Rare fresco depicting Cleopatra VII as Venus Genetrix and her son Caesarion as a cupid. Pompeii, House of Marcus Fabius Rufus. (Second style, c. 46 BC, in situ)

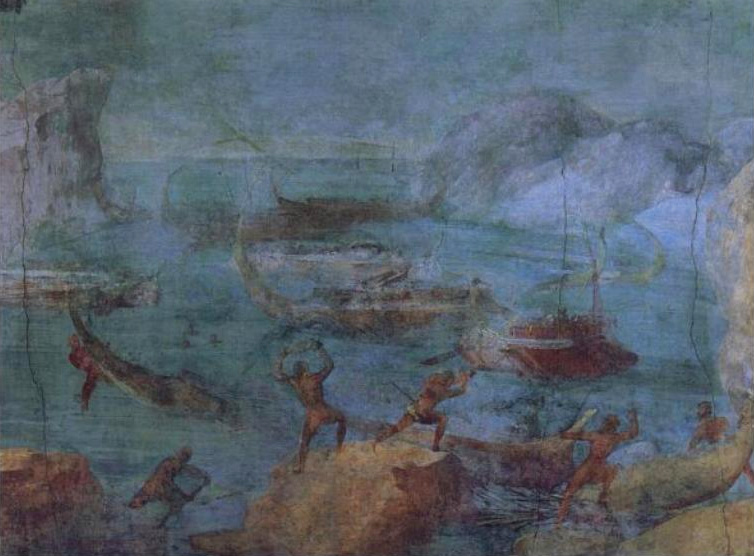
The fourth panel from the "Odyssey Landscapes" wall paintings excavated from Via Cavour. The Laestrygonians destroy Odysseus's fleet as he escapes. The West's earliest known mythological landscapes. (Second style, c. 50 BC, Vatican Museums)

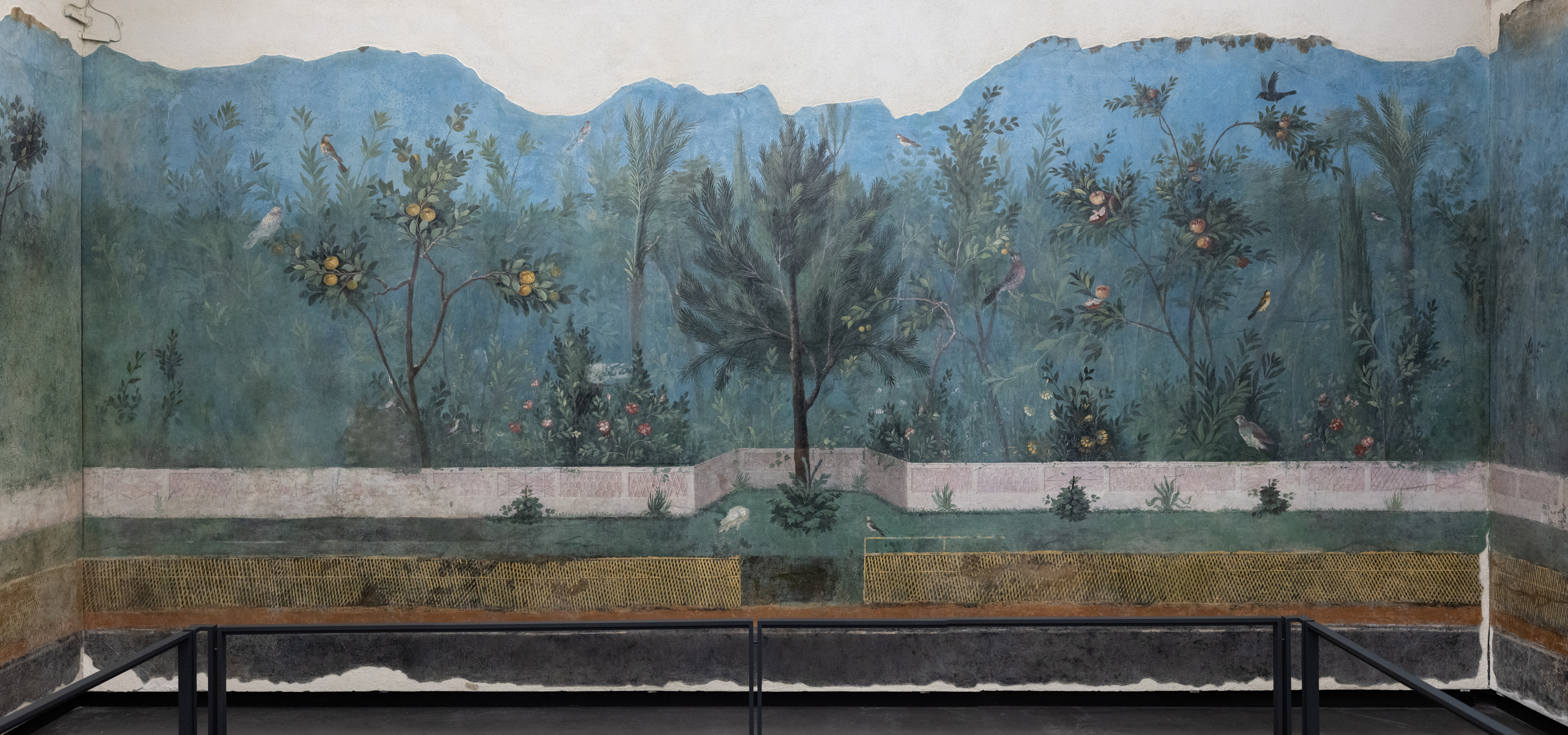
Garden Fresco, Villa of Livia (Second style, c. 30 BC. Museo Nazionale Romano)

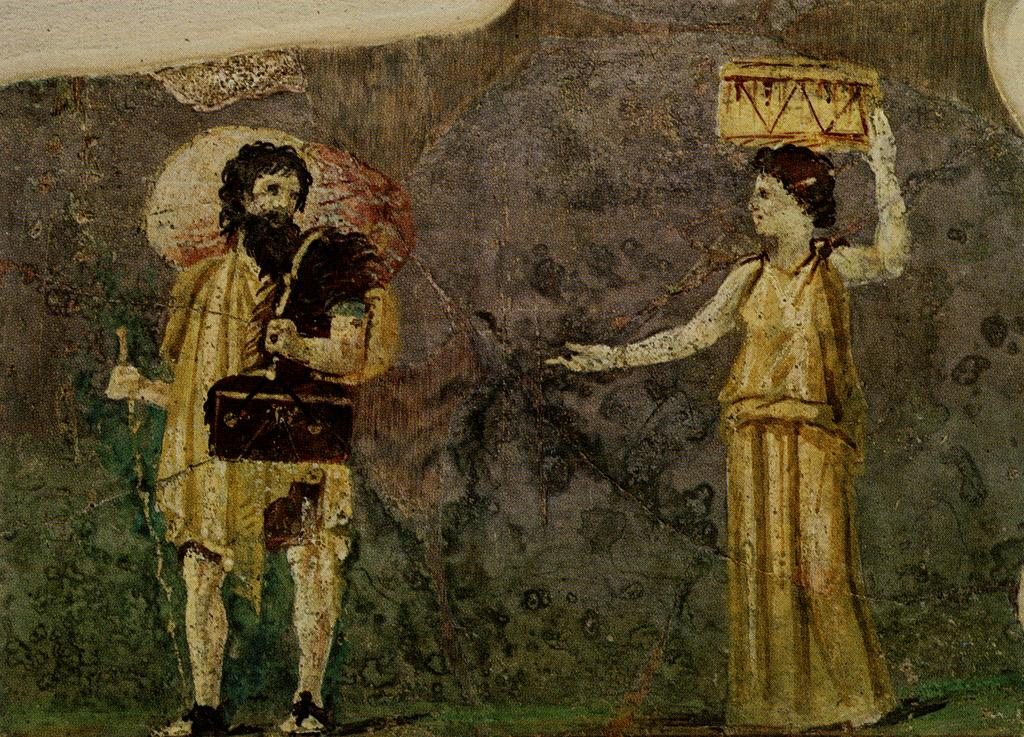
Wall painting showing the Cynic philosophers Crates (c. 365–c. 285 BC) and Hipparchia. From the garden of the Villa Farnesina. (Second style, c. 25 BC, Museo Nazionale Romano).

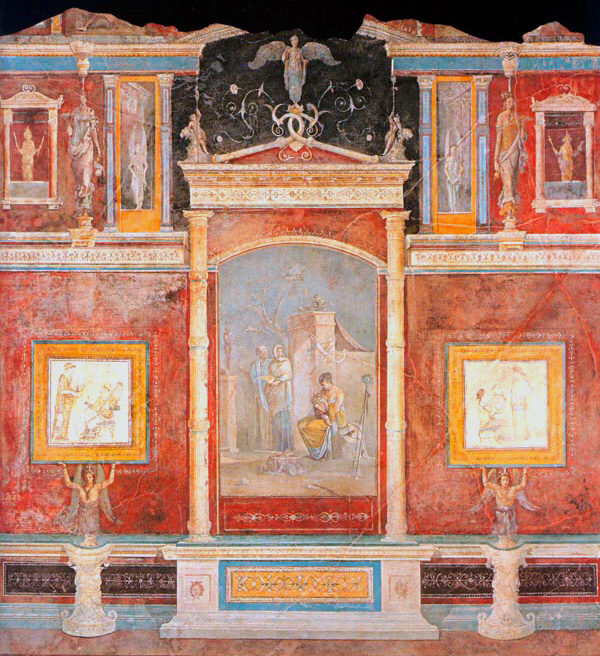
Trastevere, Casa della Farnesina (Late Second or Third Style, c. 20 BC, Palazzo Massimo alle Terme).

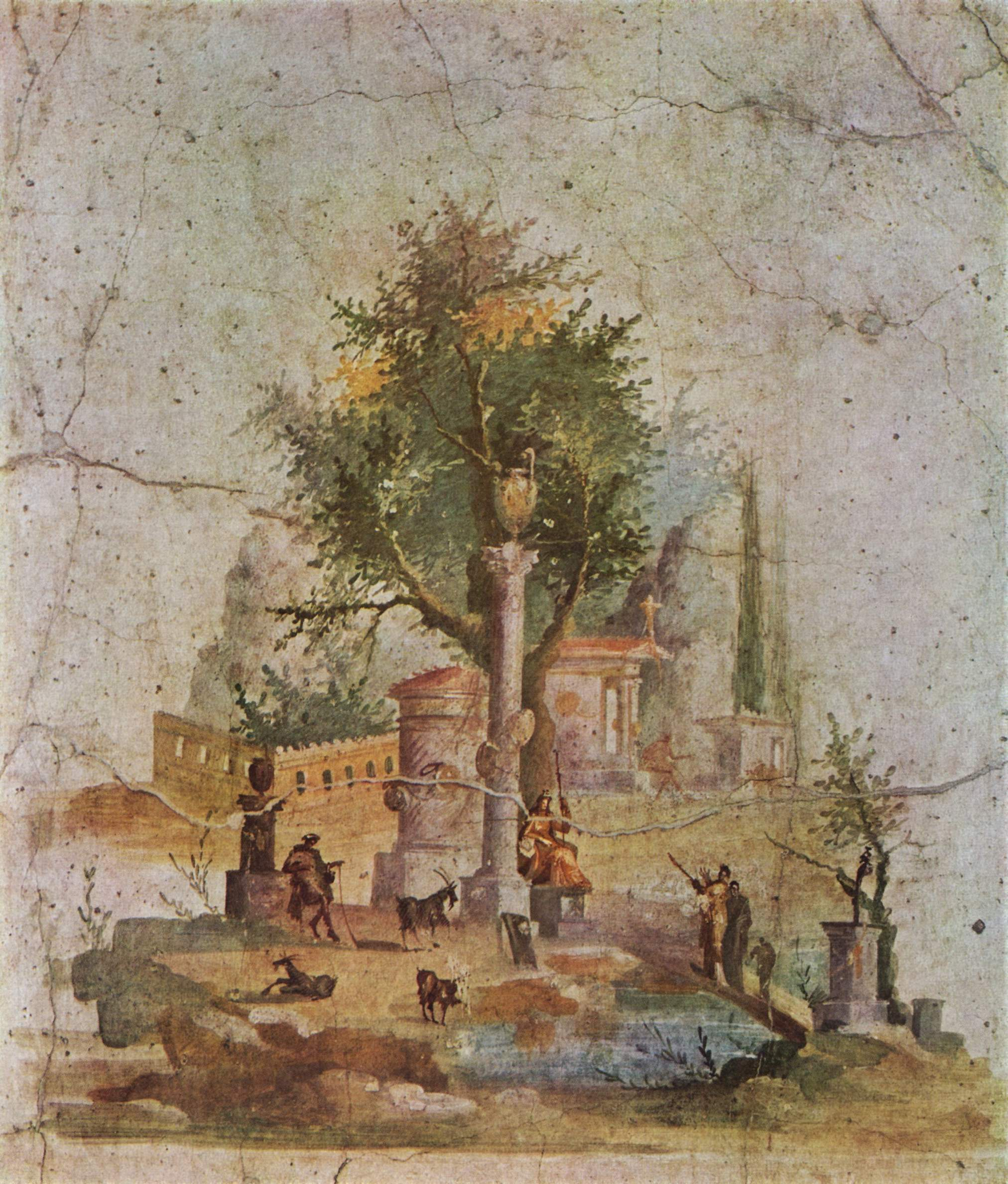
Sacral-idyllic landscape. Boscotrecase, Villa of Agrippa Postumus. (Third style, c. 15 BC, MANN)

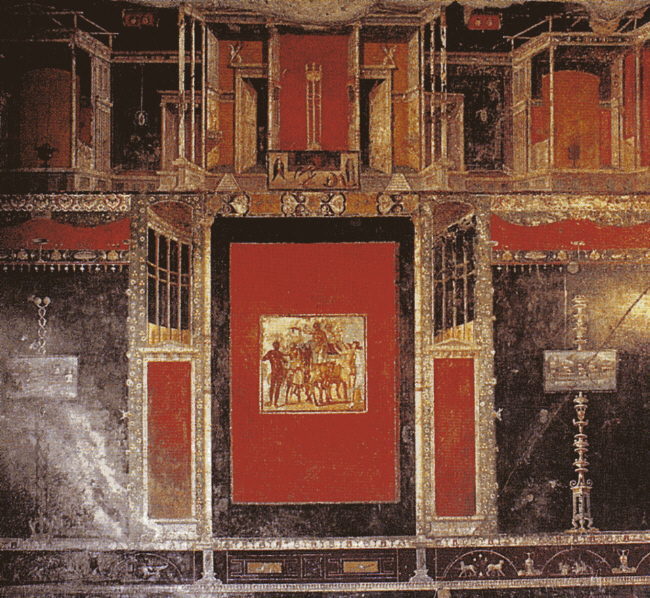
Pompeii, Lucretius Fronto's House. (Late Third style, c. 40 AD, in situ).

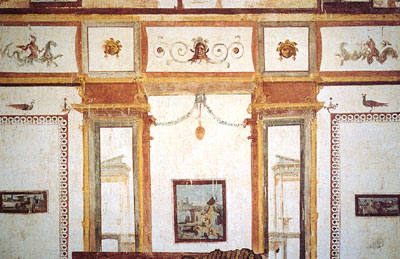
Fresco, Domus Aurea (Fourth Style, c. 66 AD, in situ)

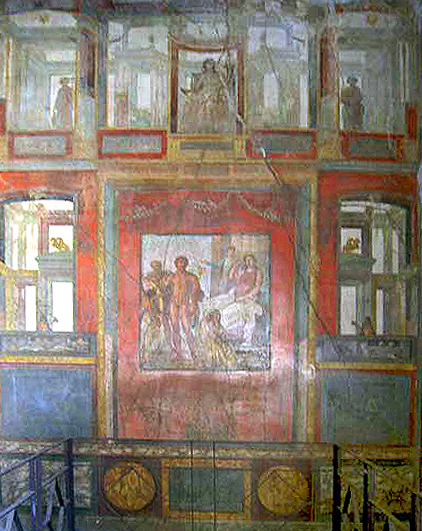
Fresco, Pompeii, House of the Vettii, central panel showing Punishment of Ixion. (Fourth style, c. 70 AD, in situ)

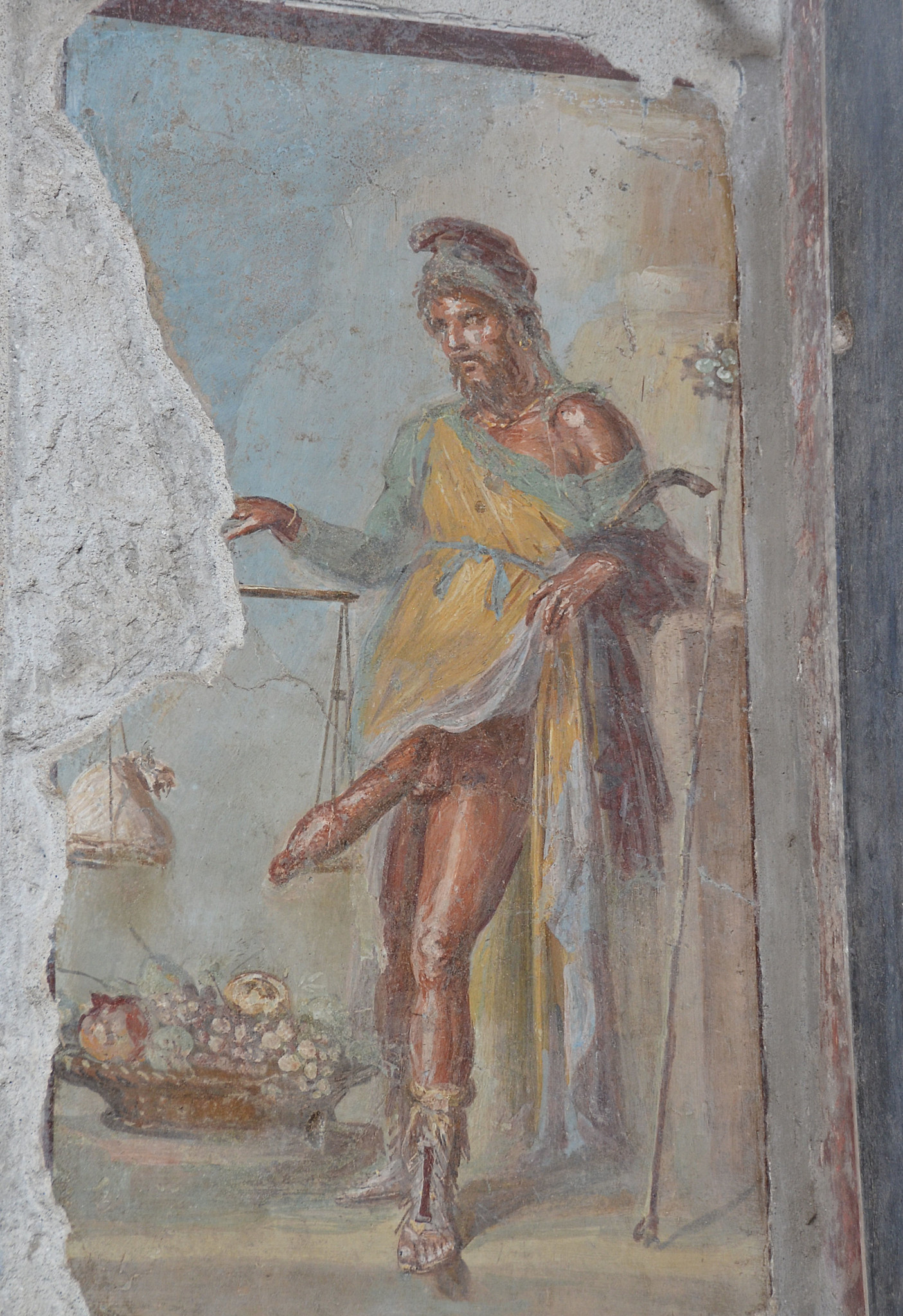
Priapus fresco, erotic art depicting the god of fertility balancing his phallus with a bag of money. Pompeii, House of the Vettii. (Fourth style, c. 70 AD, in situ)

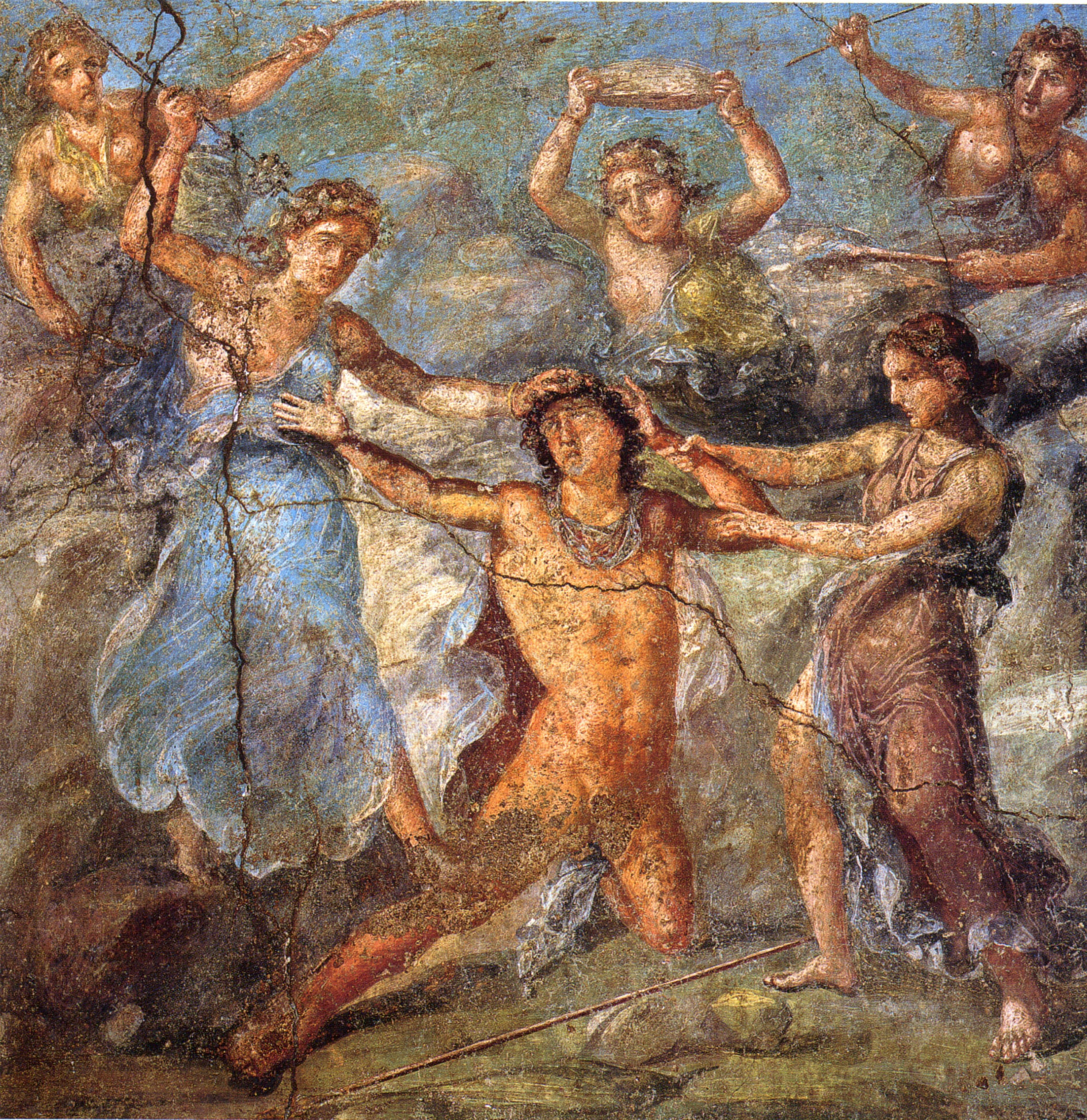
Pentheus torn apart by maenads. Pompeii, House of the Vettii. (Fourth style, c. 70 AD, in situ)

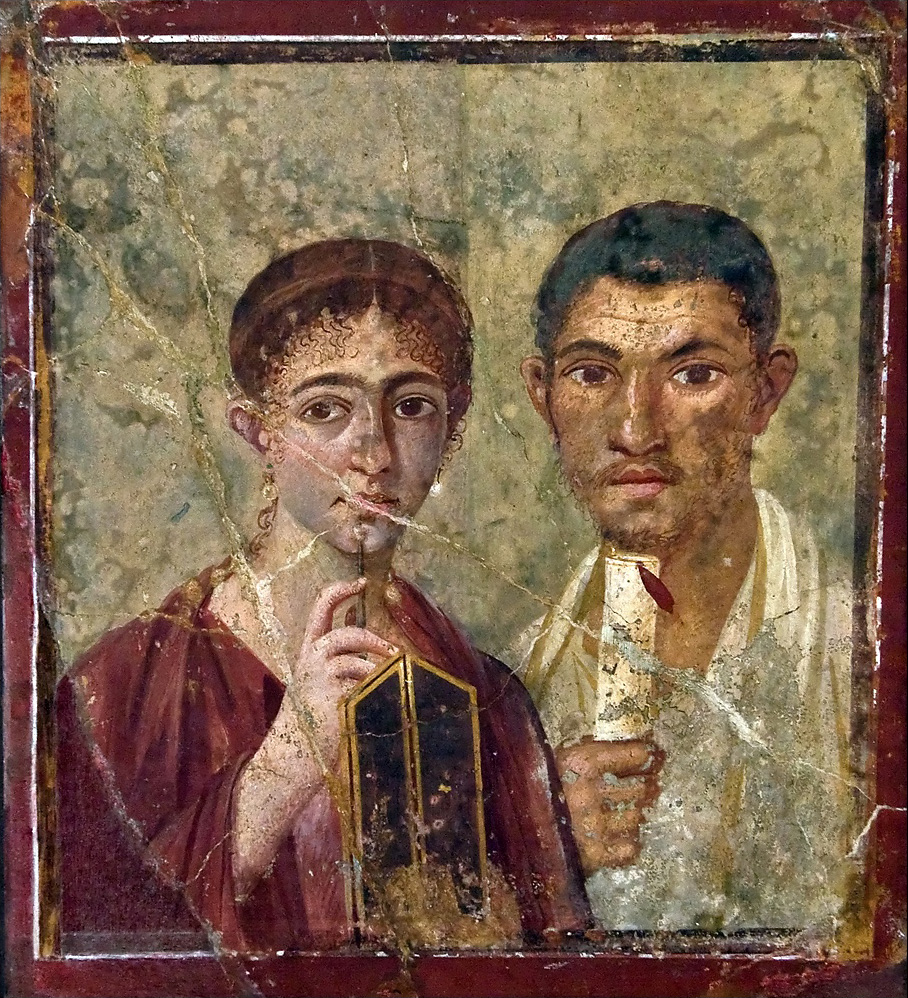
Portrait of Terentius Neo and his wife. Pompeii, House of Terentius Neo. (Fourth style, c. 50 AD, MANN)

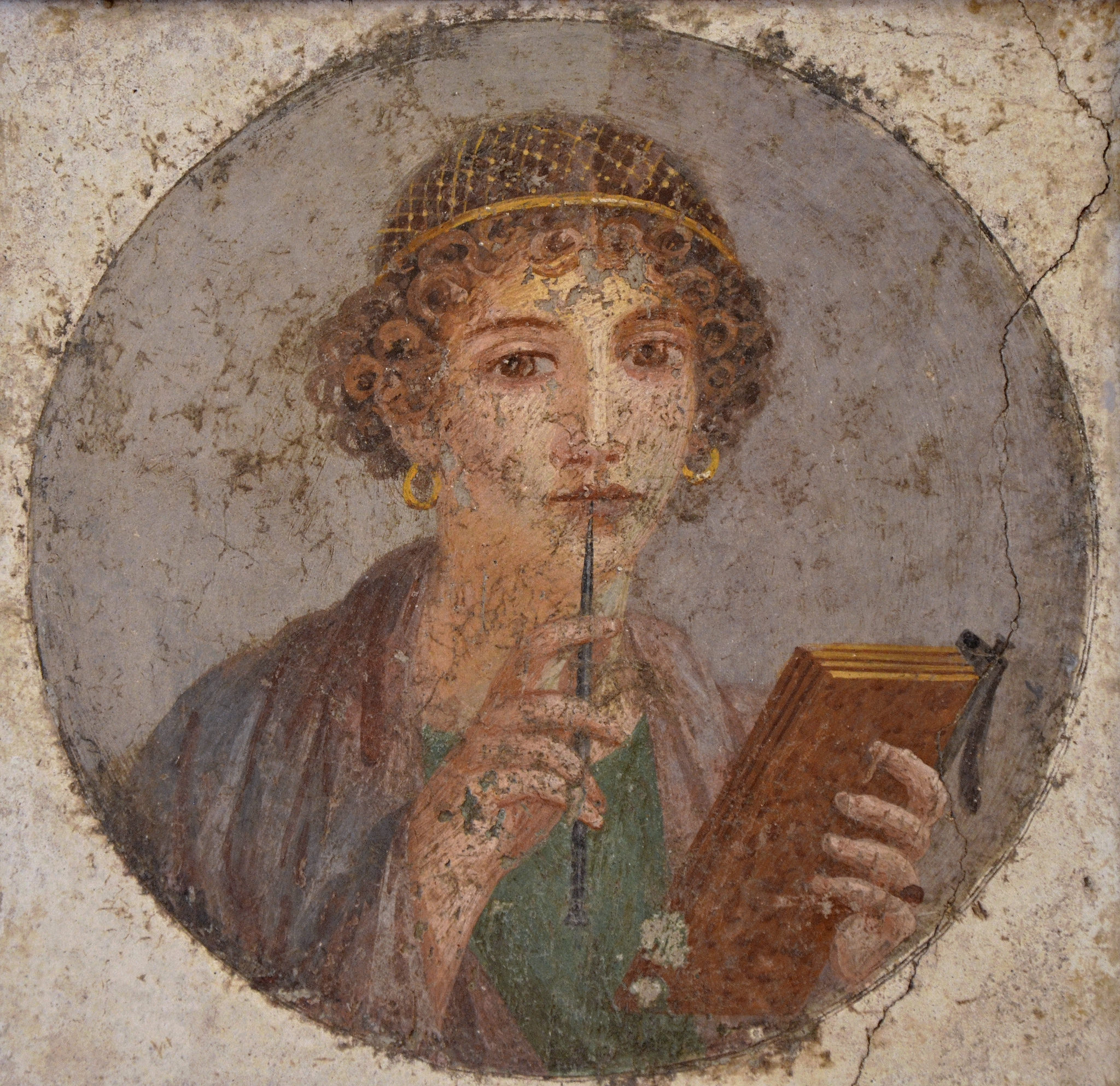
The rare Sappho Fresco, depicting an educated woman, once thought to be Greek poet Sappho. Pompeii. (Fourth style, c. 50 AD, MANN)

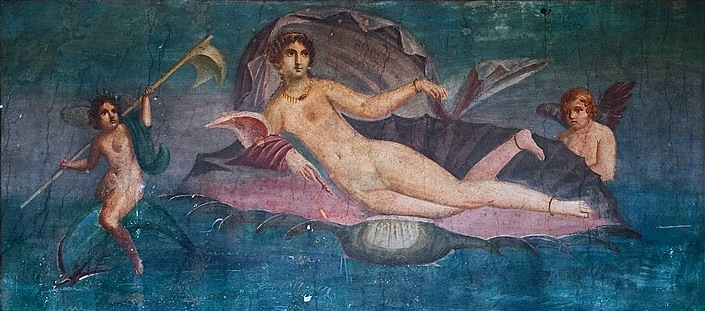
Venus Anadyomene fresco, possibly a reproduction of a painting by Apelles. (Note: A graffito from Pompeii, House of the Ara Maxima reads: “If you have not seen the portrait of Venus by Apelles, look at my girlfriend, she’s just as beautiful as her”.) Pompeii, House of Venus in the Shell. (Fourth style, c. 70 AD, in situ)

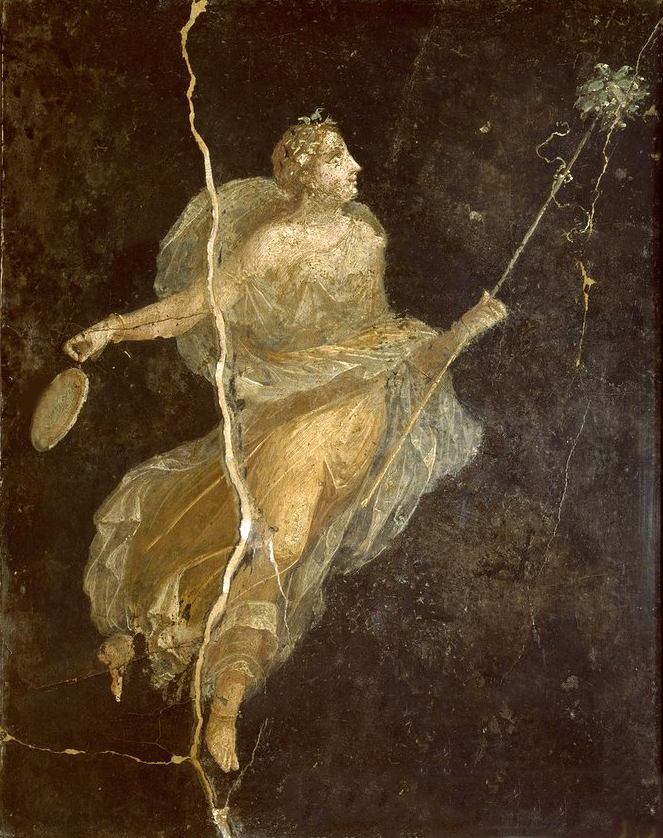
Fresco of maenad in a silk dress. Pompeii, Casa del Naviglio. (Fourth style, 70 AD, MANN)

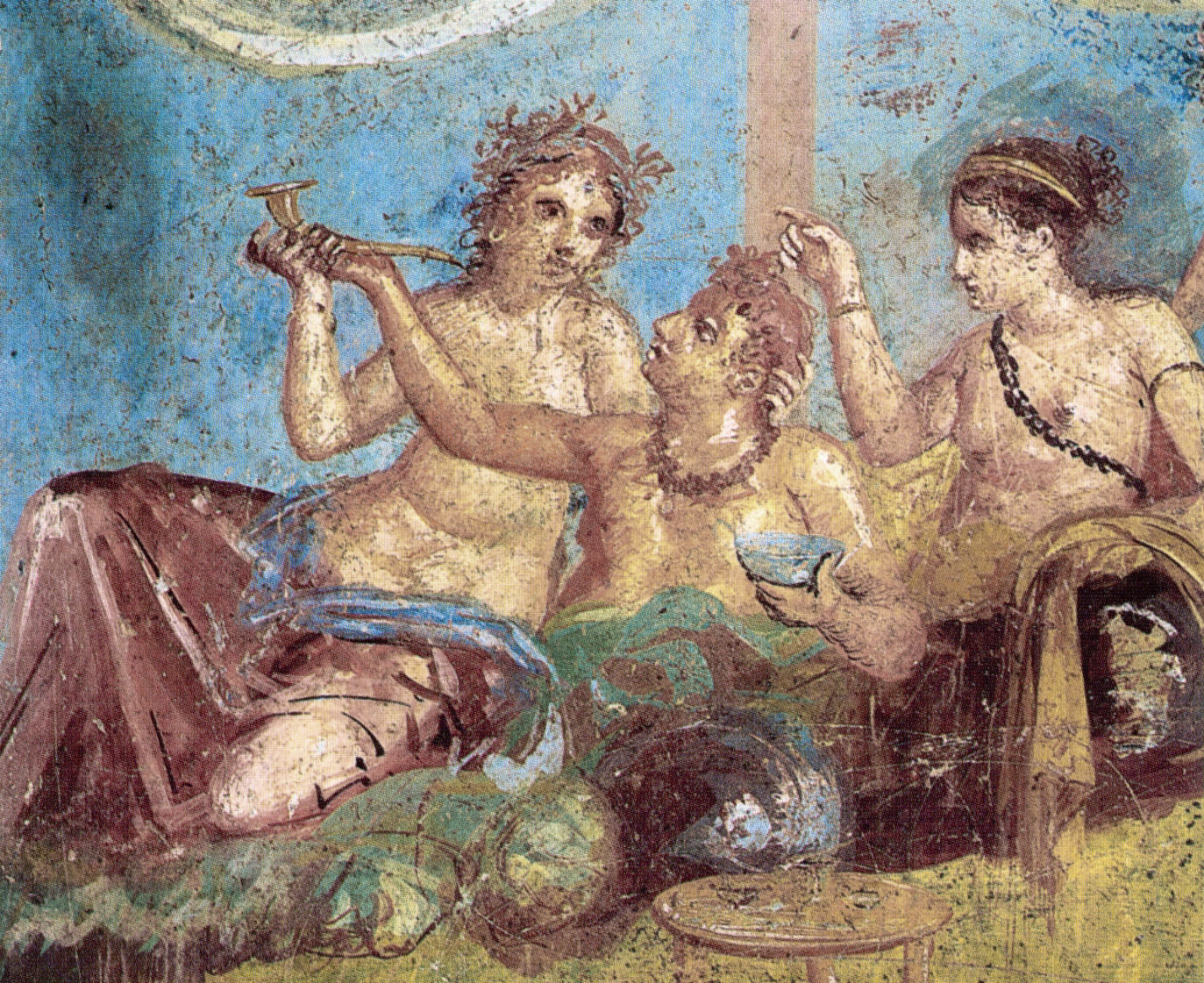
Banquet fresco. Pompeii, House of the Chaste Lovers. (Fourth style, c. 70 AD, in situ)

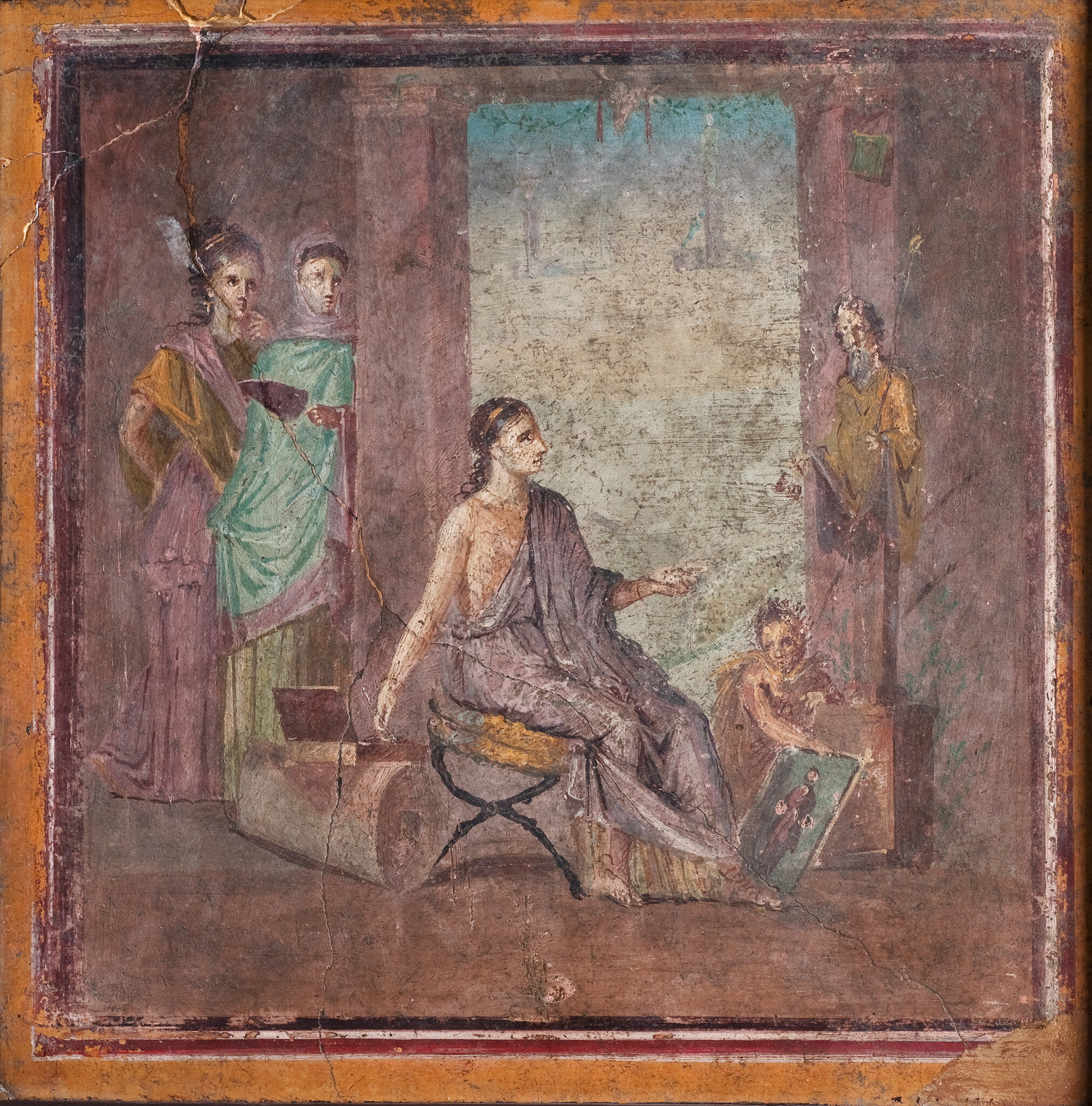
Fresco of lady artist painting a statue. Pompeii, House of the Surgeon (Fourth style, c. 60 AD, MANN)

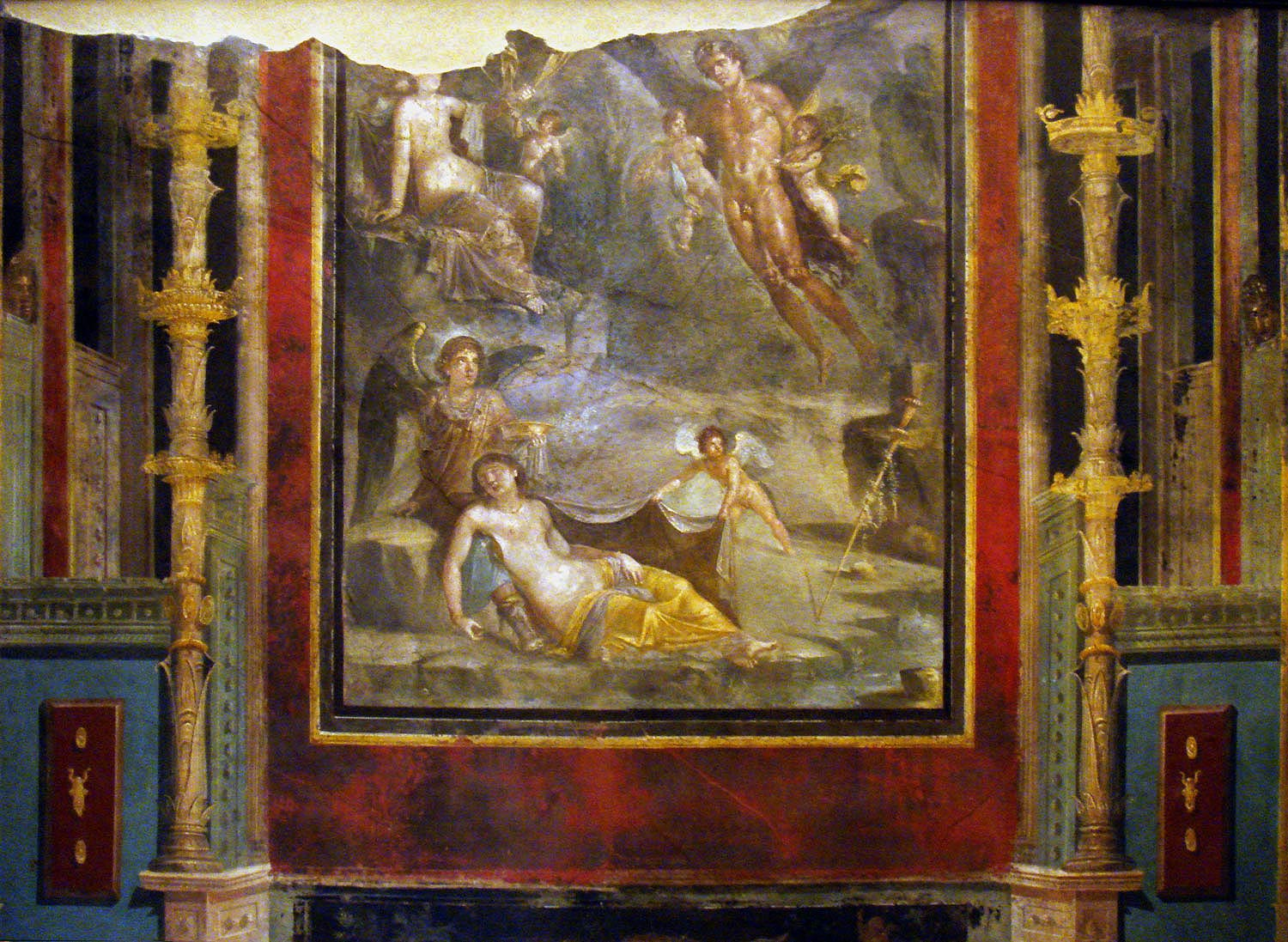
The wedding of Zephyrus and Chloris. Pompeii, House of Naviglio. (Fourth style, c. 60 AD, MANN)

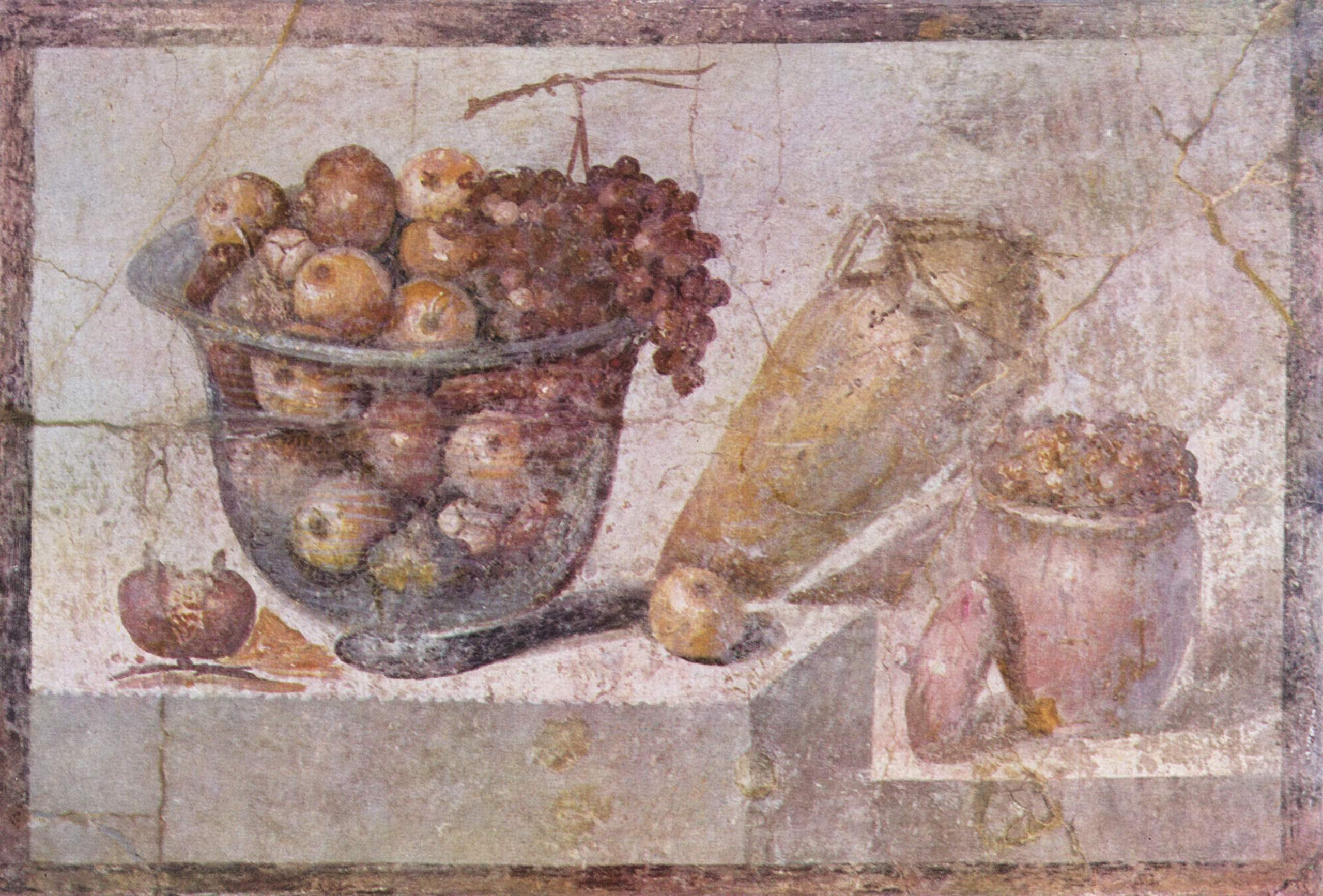
Still life xenia fresco. Pompeii, Home of Julia Felix. (Fourth style, c. 70 AD)

Still life xenia fresco. Pompeii, House of the Painters at Work. (Fourth style, c. 70 AD, Archaeological Park of Pompeii)

Still life xenia fresco. Herculaneum, House of the Stags. (Fourth-style, c. 70 AD, MANN)

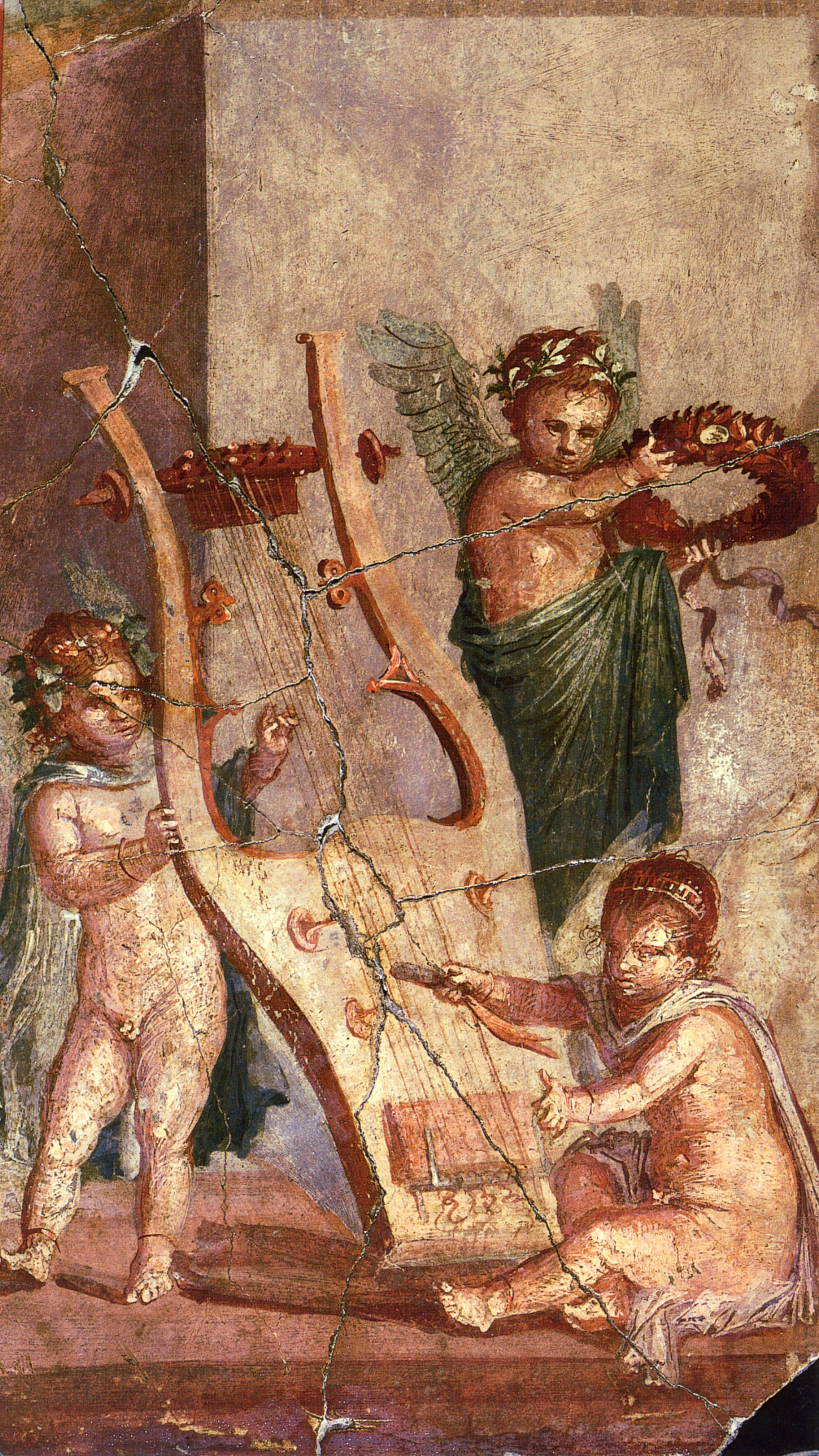
Cupids playing with a lyre, from Herculaneum Basilica (Fourth style, c. 70 AD, MANN).

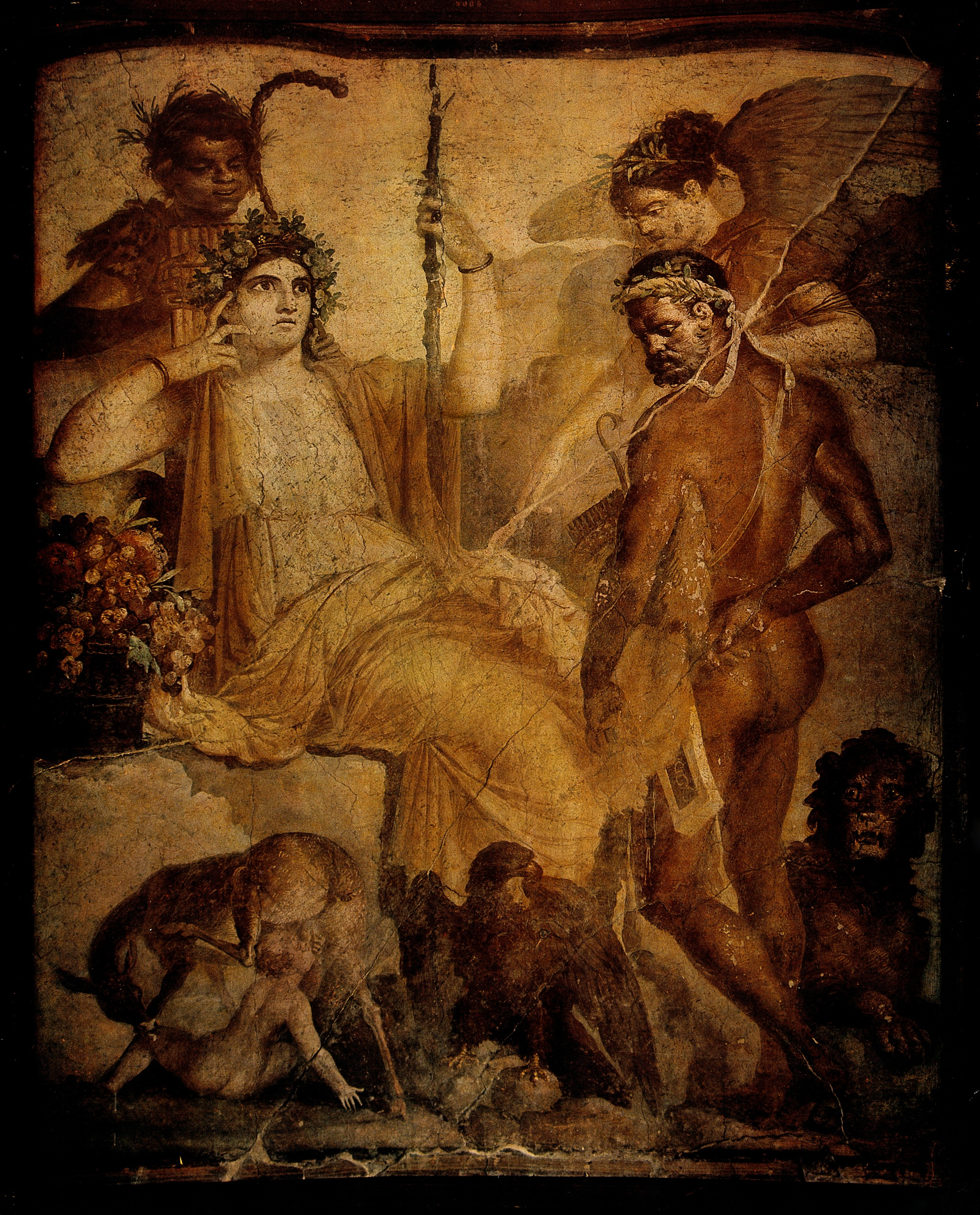
Telephus, son of Hercules, being suckled by a doe in the temple of Minerva, where as an infant he was left to die. Herculaneum. (Fourth style, c. 70 AD, MANN)

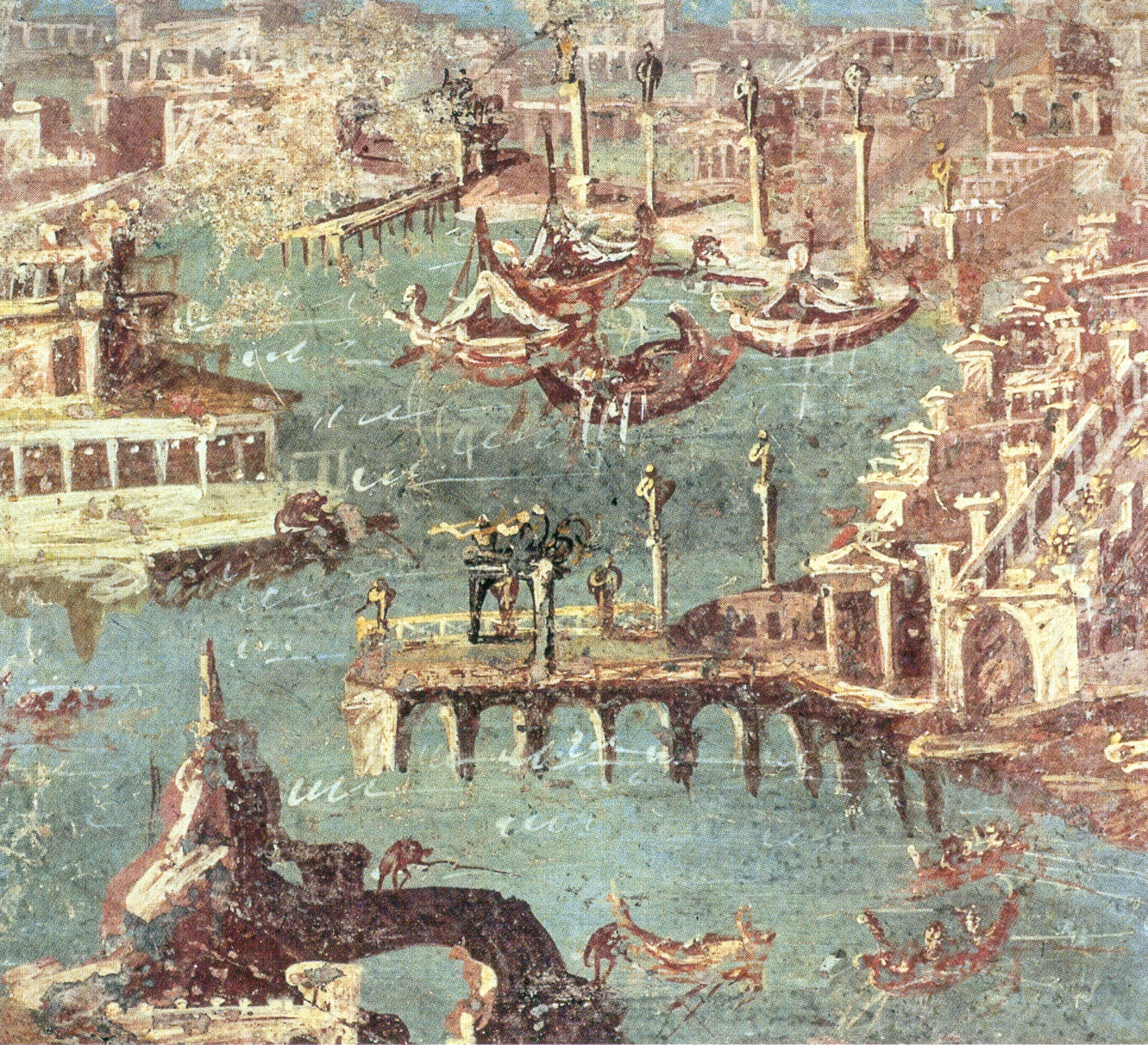
Port fresco, Stabiae (Fourth style, c. 60 AD, MANN)

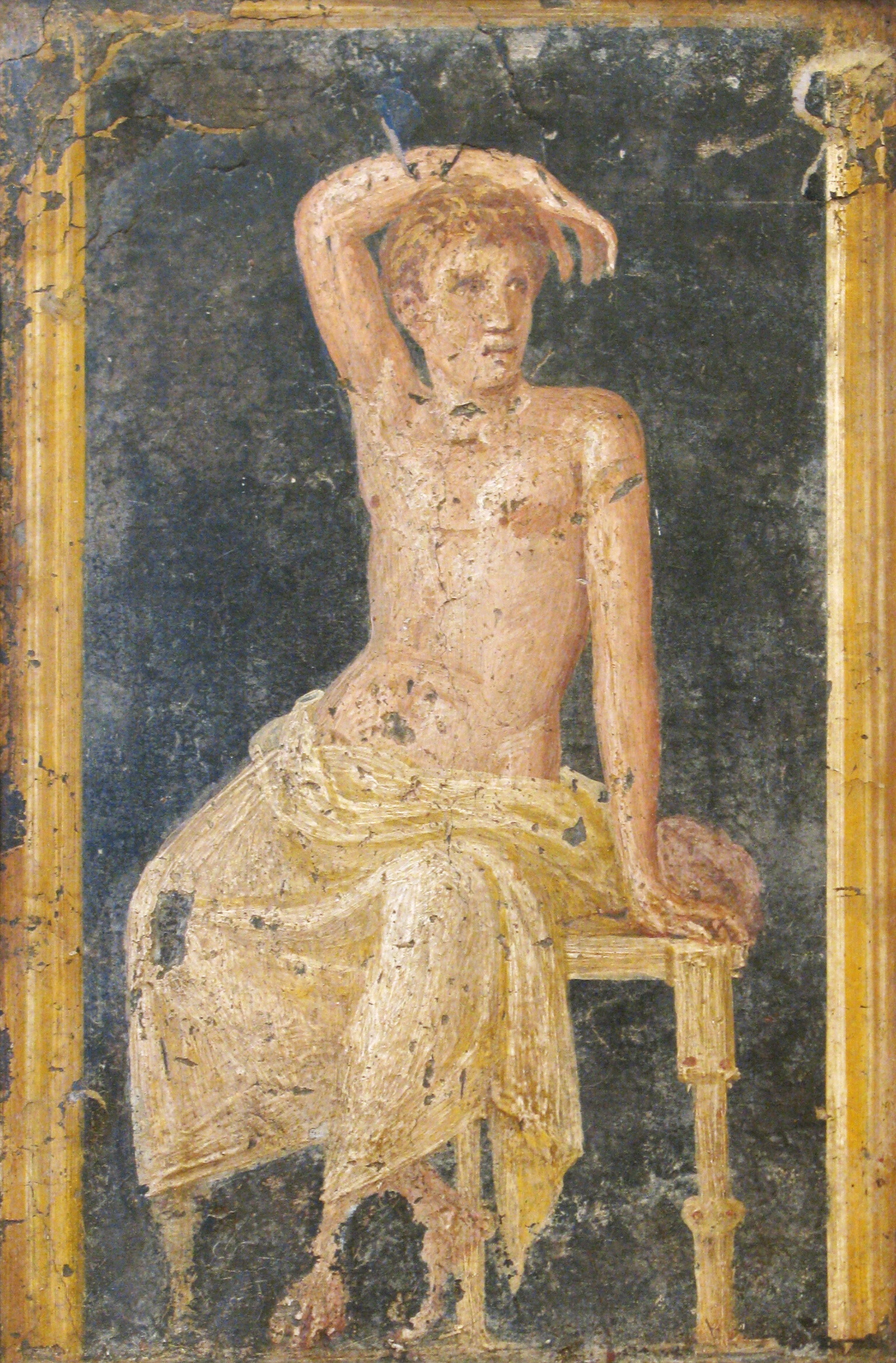
Fresco of a young man. Stabiae, Villa Arianna. (Fourth style, c. 60 AD, MANN)

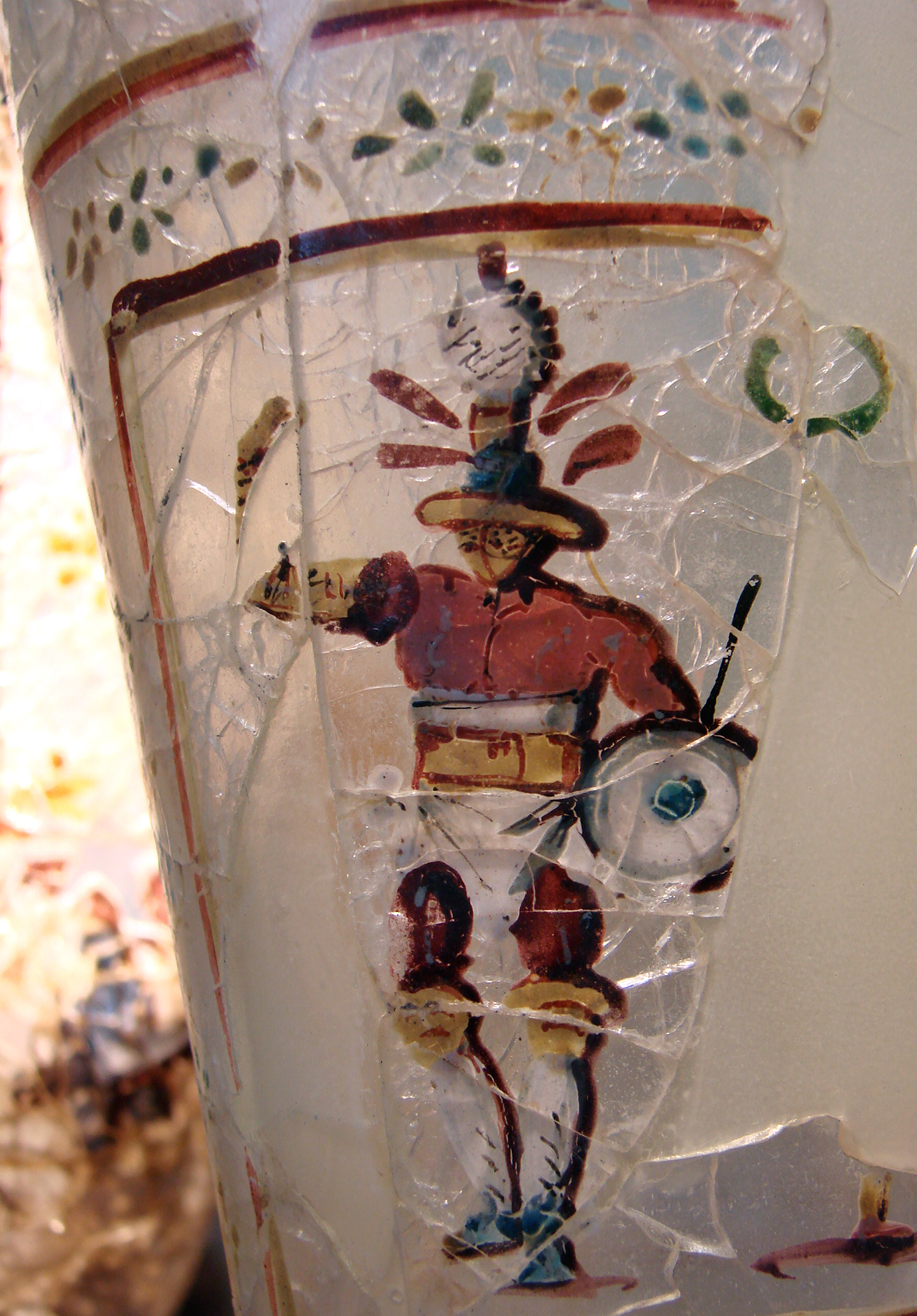
Roman glass with a painted figure of a gladiator (c. 100 AD, Musée Guimet), found at Begram, Afghanistan (once part of the Greco-Bactrian Kingdom, then under the Kushan Empire.

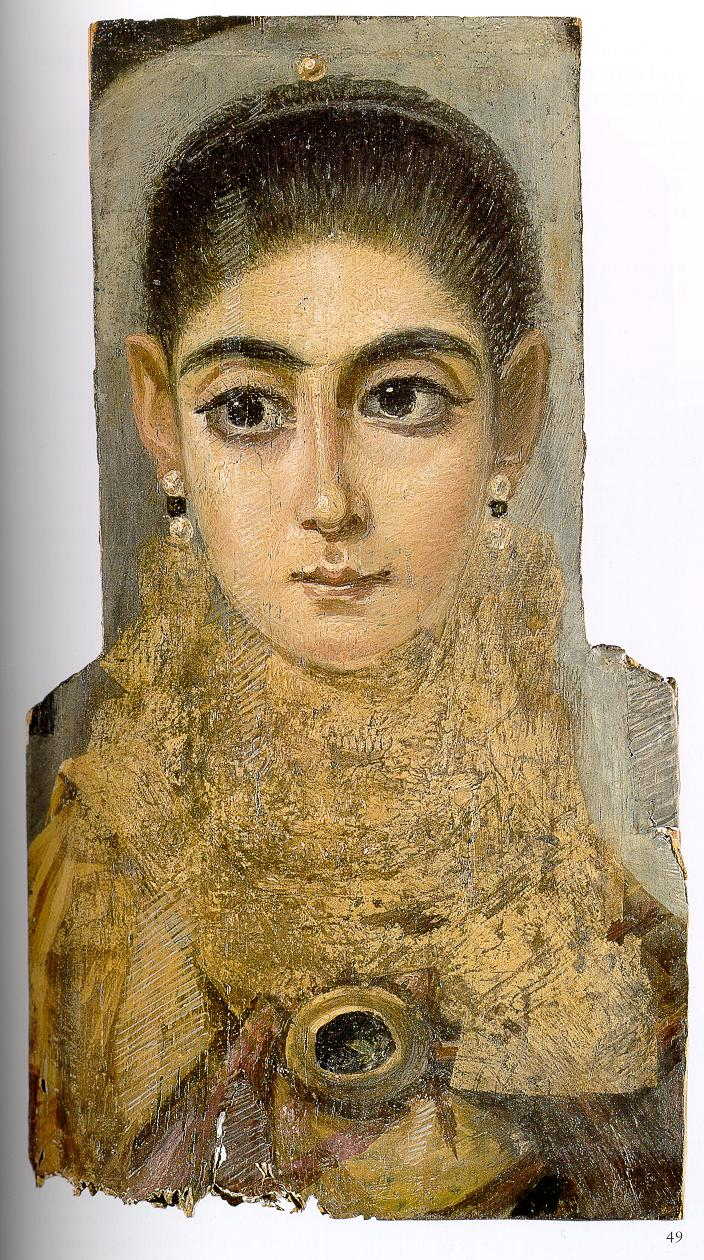
Portrait of a woman, known as "L'Européenne", one of the Fayum mummy portraits. (c. 120–130 AD, Louvre)

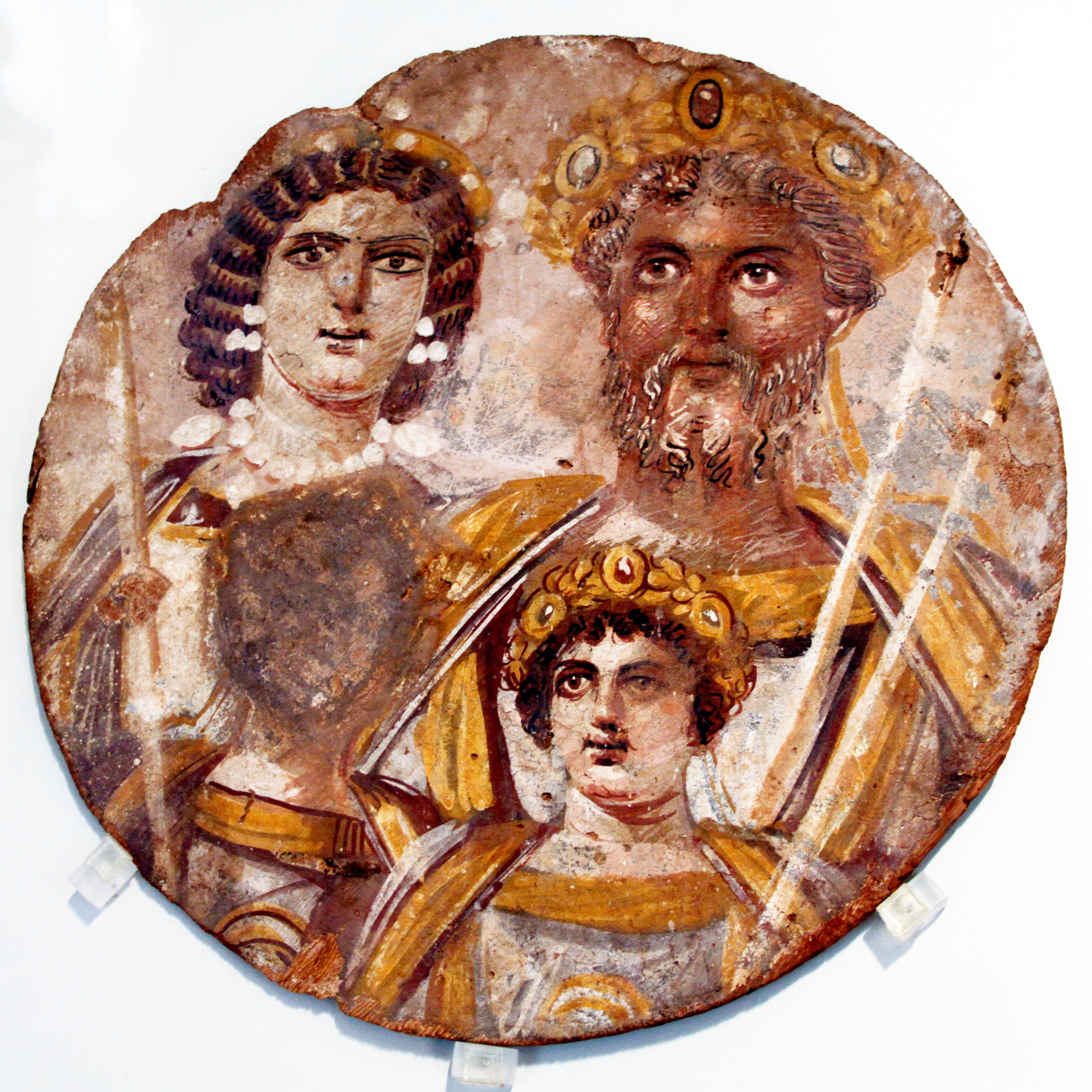
Severan Tondo (c. 200 AD, Altes Museum), the first two generations of the Severan dynasty. Portraits of emperor Septimius Severus (145–211), his wife, augusta Julia Domna (c. 160–217), and their two sons and co-augusti Caracalla (188–217) and Geta (189–211), with face rubbed out as Damnatio memoriae

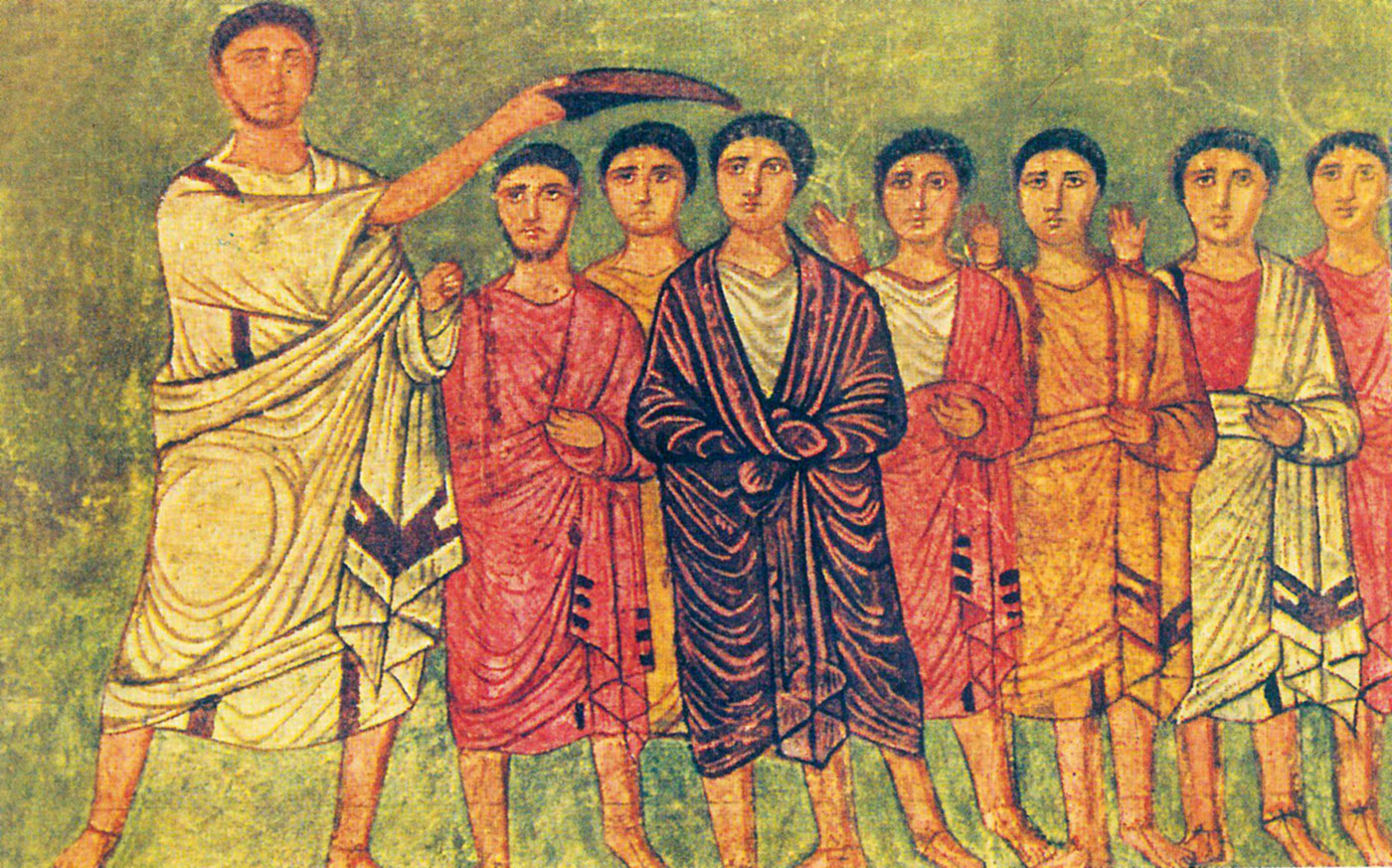
Syrian fresco from Dura Europos Synagogue showing David anointed by Samuel. (c. 245 AD, National Museum of Damascus)

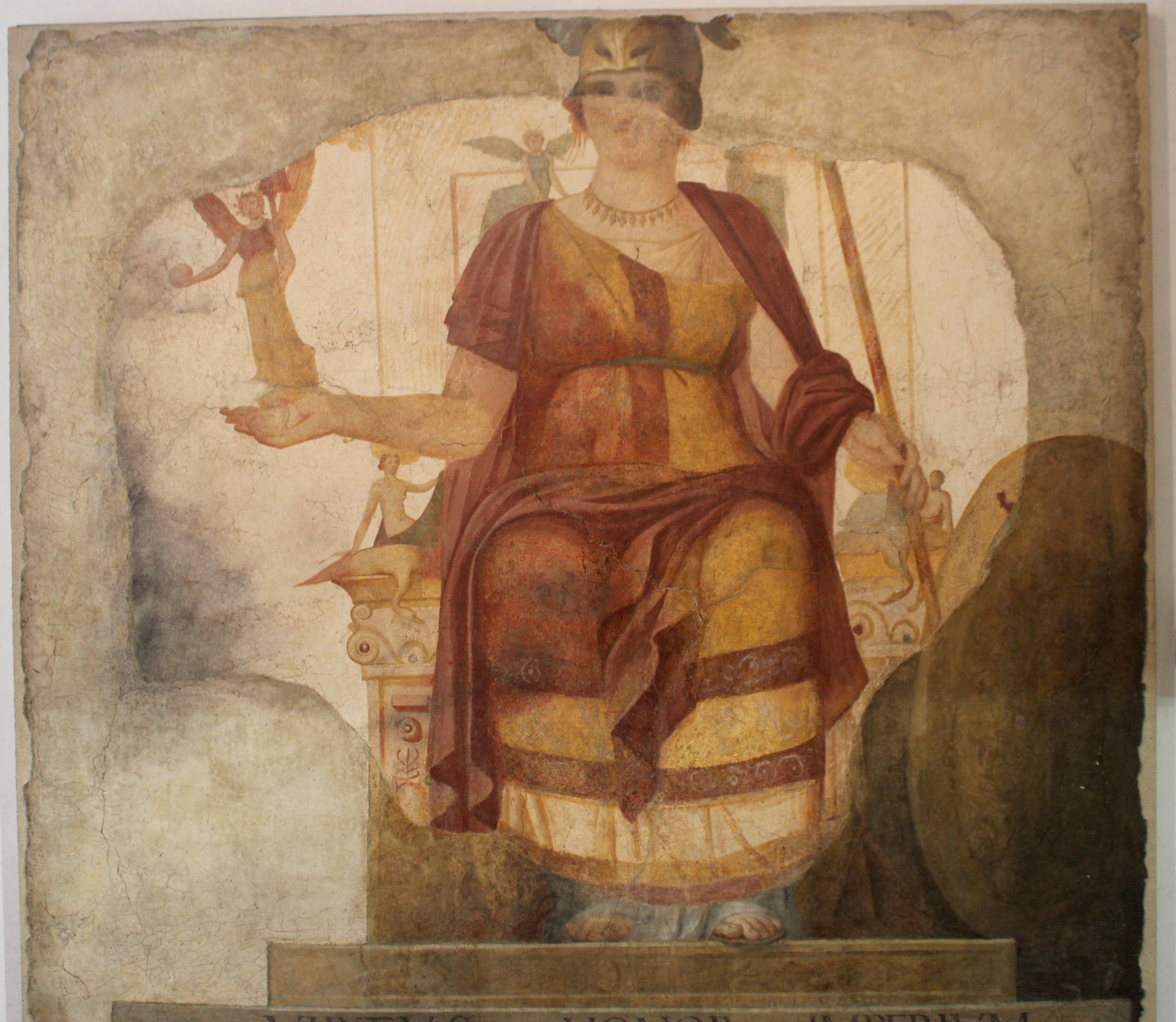
Fresco with a seated Venus, the so-called "Dea Barberini". (c. 325 AD, Palazzo Massimo alle Terme)

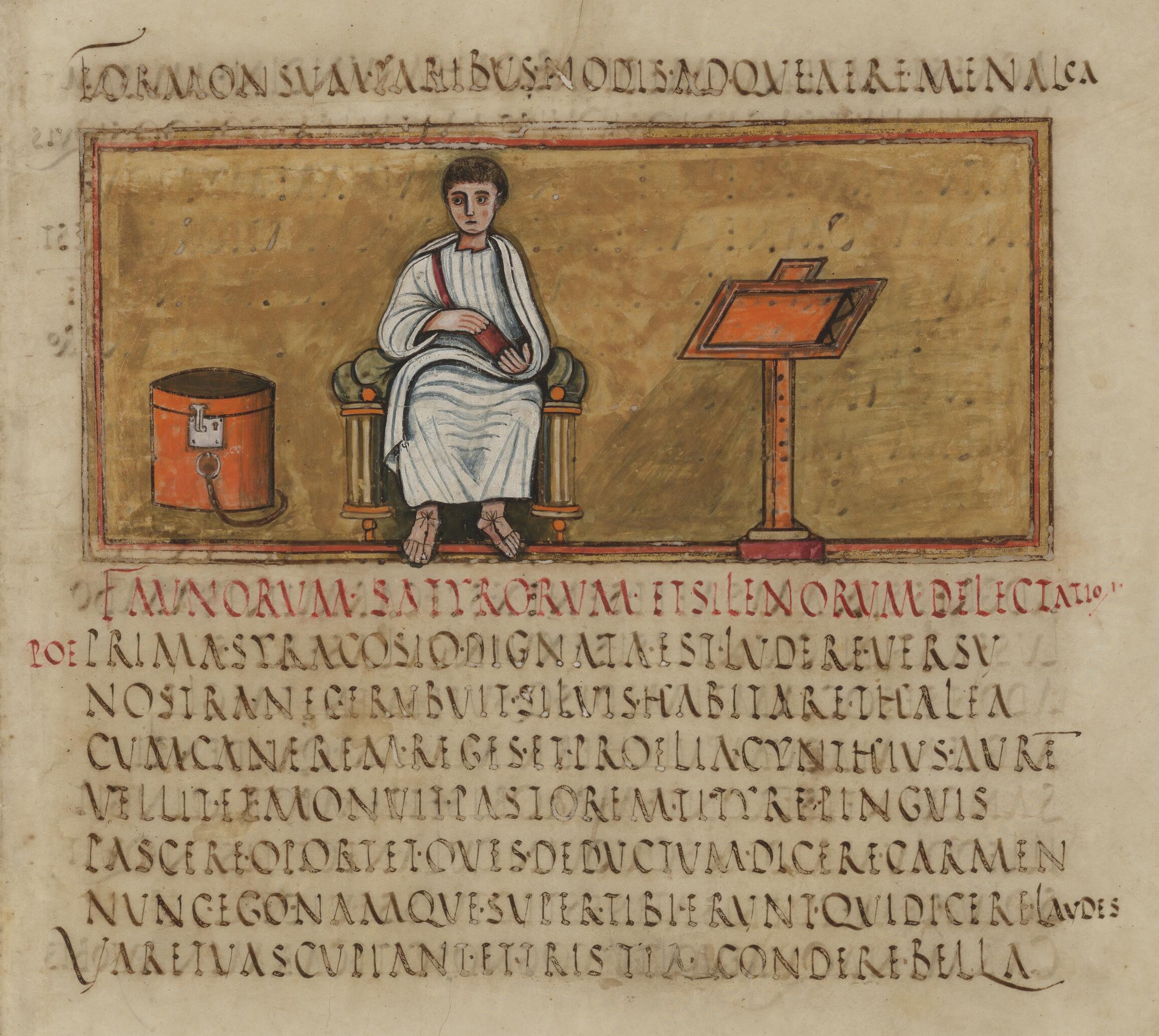
Roman Vergil (c. 450 AD, Vatican Library), Folio 14 contains an author portrait of Virgil.

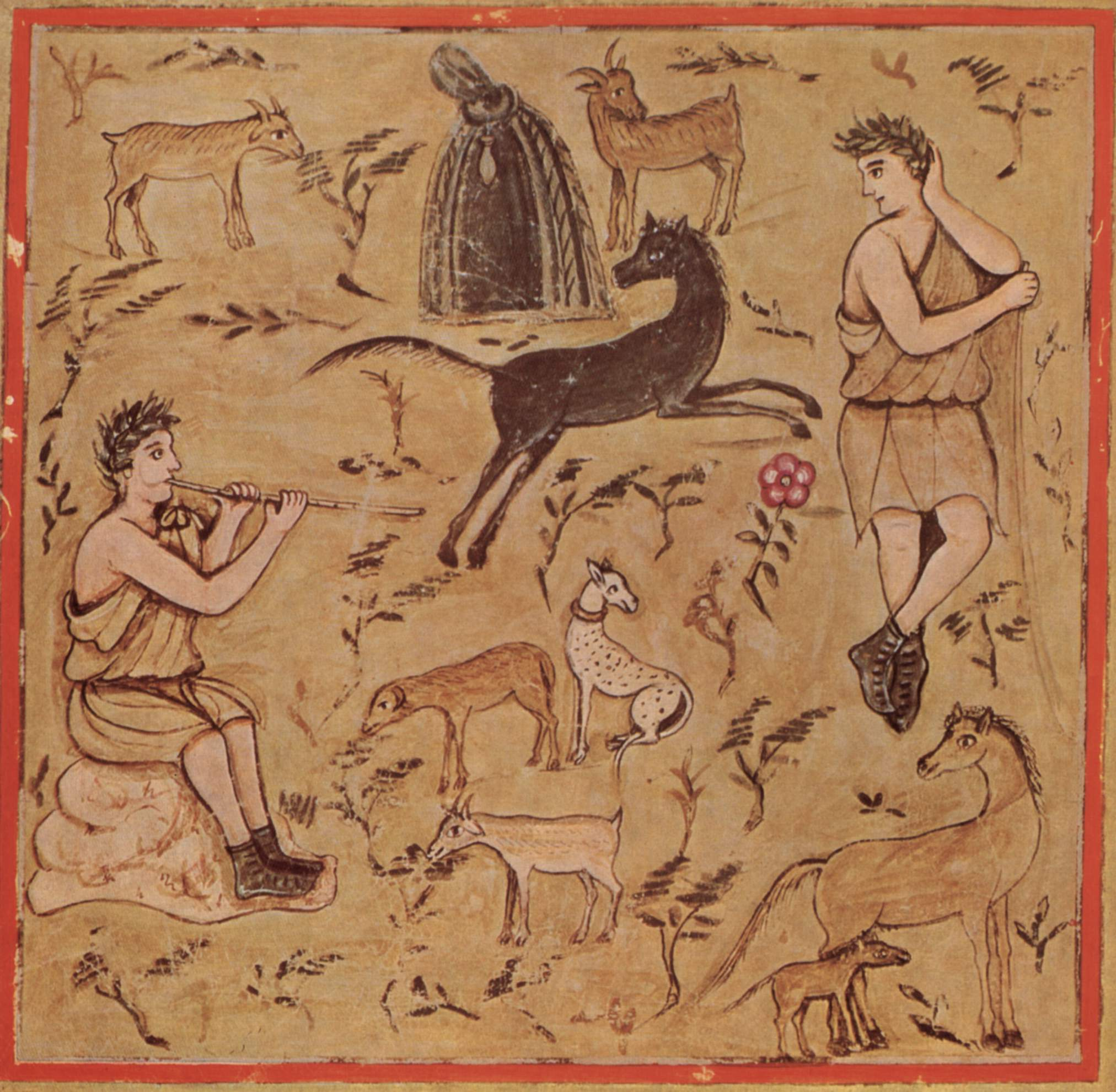
Roman Vergil Georgics Book III, shepherd with flocks.

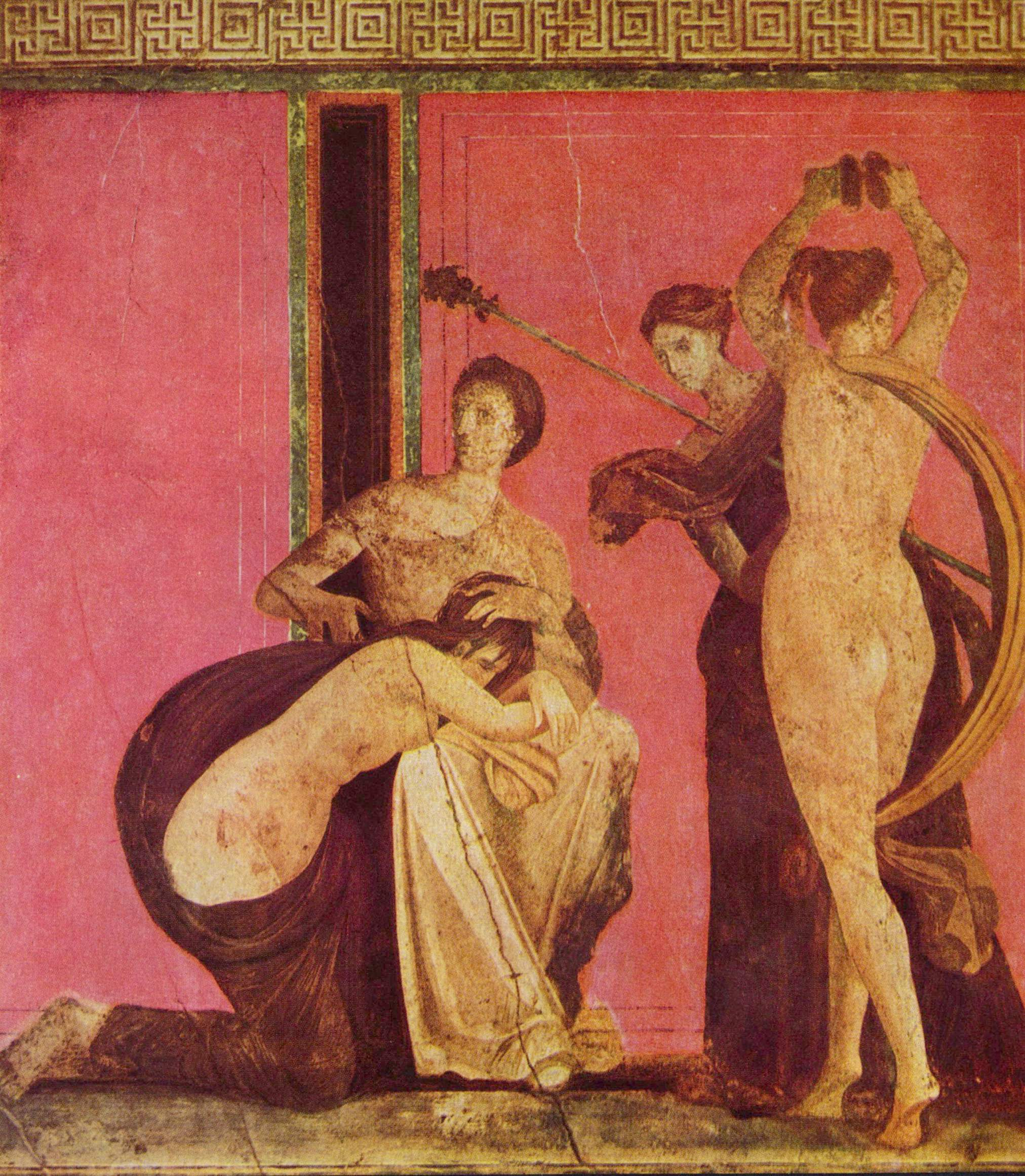
Fresco of a maenad dancing and another Dionysian Mysteries initiate about to be scourged. Pompeii, Villa of the Mysteries (Second style, c. 55 BC, in situ)

Roman painting was influenced by Etruscan and Greek painting, shown in both frescoes and mosaics, but with its own unique characteristics, containing ancient examples of trompe-l'œil, and more realistic landscapes, advanced by Spurius Tadius (fl. 1st century BC).

Gaius Fabius Pictor (fl. 304 BC) is traditionally the first painter of the Roman Republic (509–27 BC), when he decorated the Temple of Salus with frescoes, celebrating victory in the Second Samnite War (326–304 BC).

Pliny the Elder mentions no other Roman painters until poet Pacuvius (c. 220–c. 130 BC). Famulus (fl. 65 AD) was a prominent painter of the imperial period, tasked by emperor Nero (37–68 AD) with decorating the Domus Aurea after the Great Fire of Rome (64 AD).

The Romans conquered the Etruscans (c. 265 BC), and conquered Greece after the Achaean War (146 BC). They conquered Ptolemaic Egypt following the Battle of Actium (31 BC).

In addition to Hellenistic Roman art, surviving examples of Roman painting are divided into four styles by scholars such as August Mau (1840–1909), and include wall, panel, and vase paintings, many from villas, especially those in Campania, at sites buried by the 79 AD eruption of Mount Vesuvius, such as Herculaneum and Pompeii. (Note: Pompeii also suffered an earthquake in 62 AD.) The most notable repository is the National Archaeological Museum, Naples (MANN).

Some of the few surviving, painted portraits from antiquity are several Egyptian coffin-portraits found in Al-Fayum; Fayum also has panel paintings of gods, with some of the earliest frames. Few miniatures from Late Antique illustrated manuscripts survive.

== Middle Ages ==
=== Byzantine art ===
Image Gallery (Click "Show" to view)
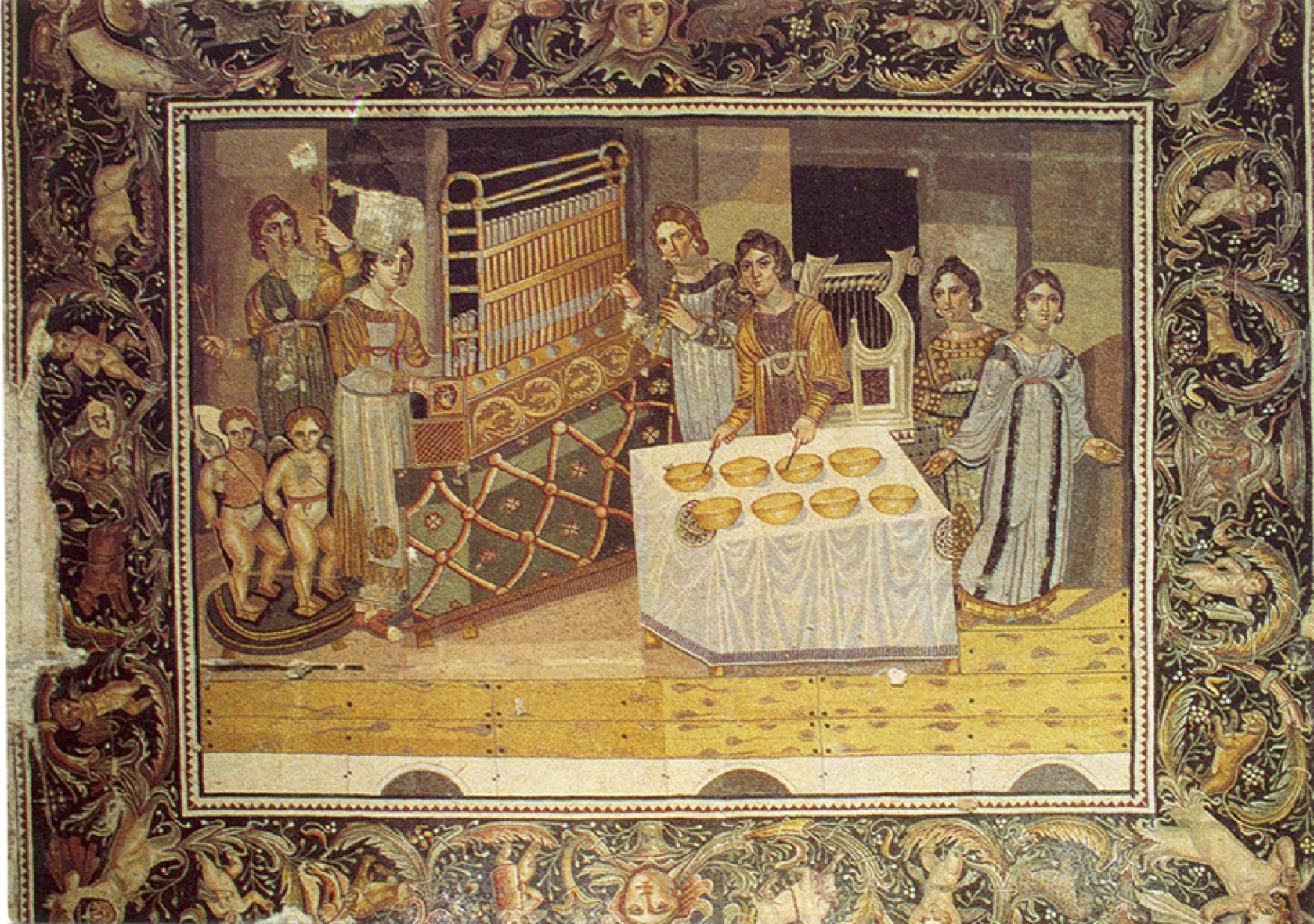
Mosaic (c. 400) from Maryamin showing six woman musicians and their instruments: Cymbal tongs, water organ, double aulos (or tibia), acetabulae or cup-cymbals, kithara, and finger cymbals.

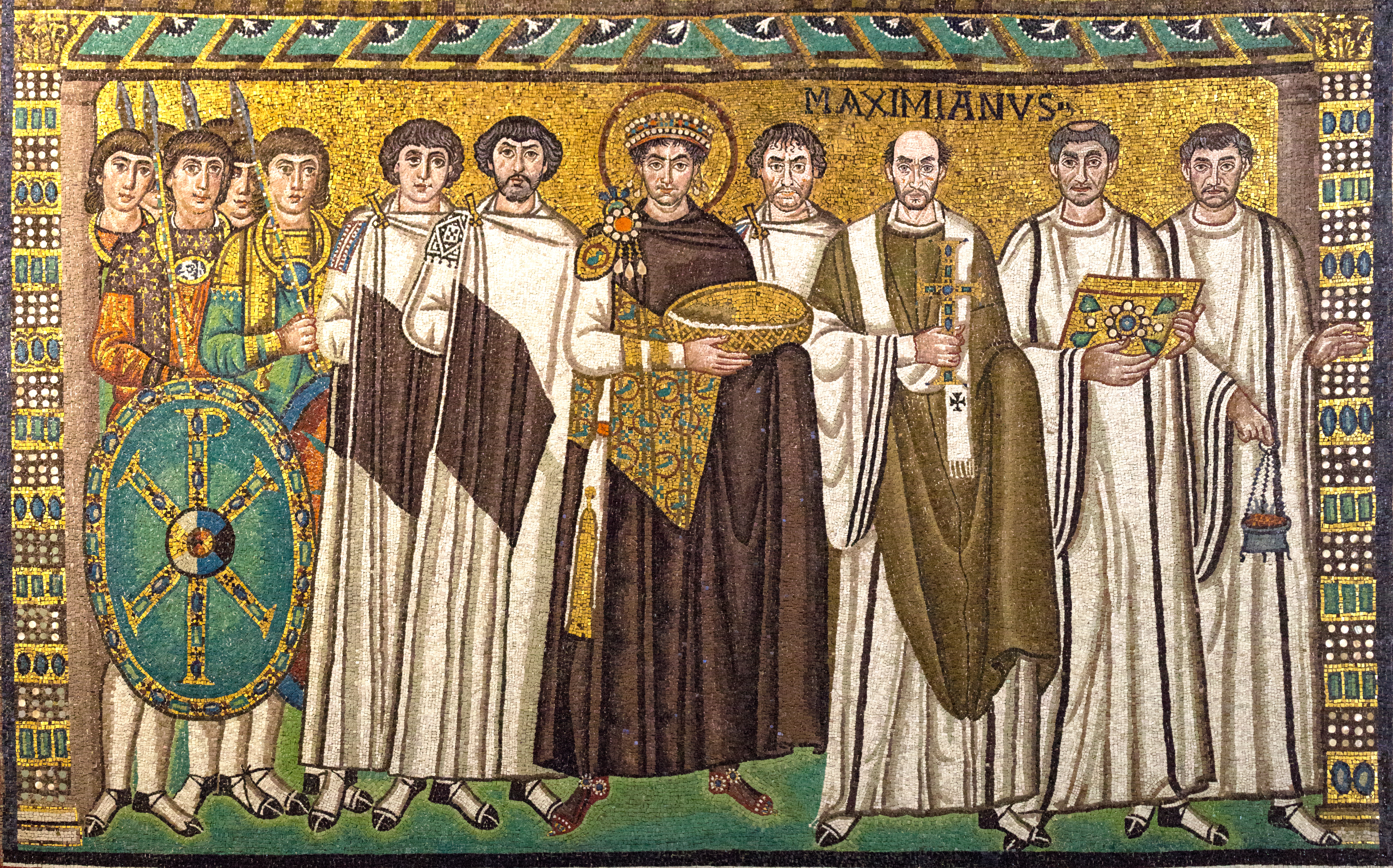
Mosaic (c. 547) of Emperor Justinian I with his retinue and Bishop Maximian, from Basilica of San Vitale.

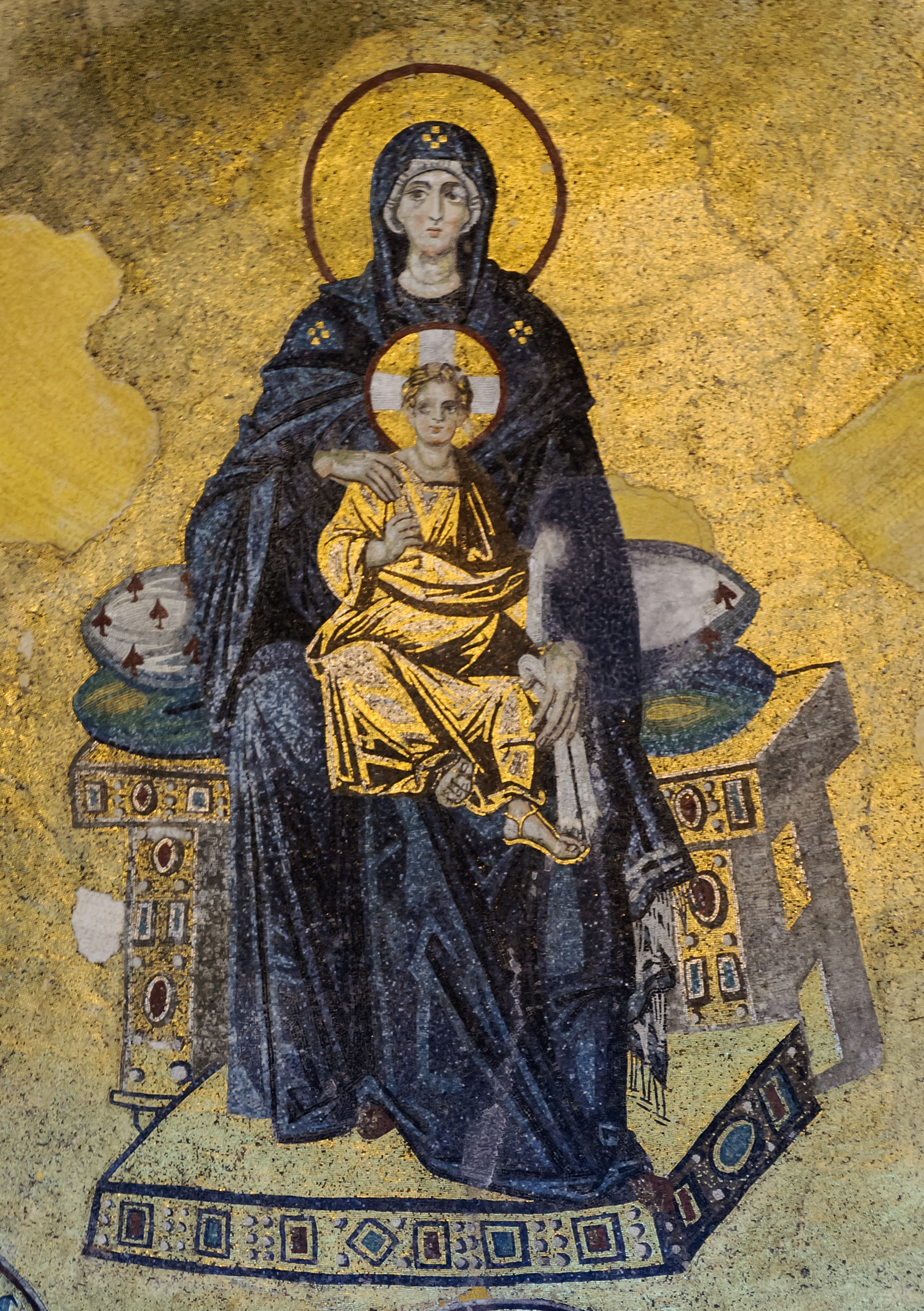
Virgin Mary with Christ mosaic (Macedonian, 867), from Hagia Sophia.

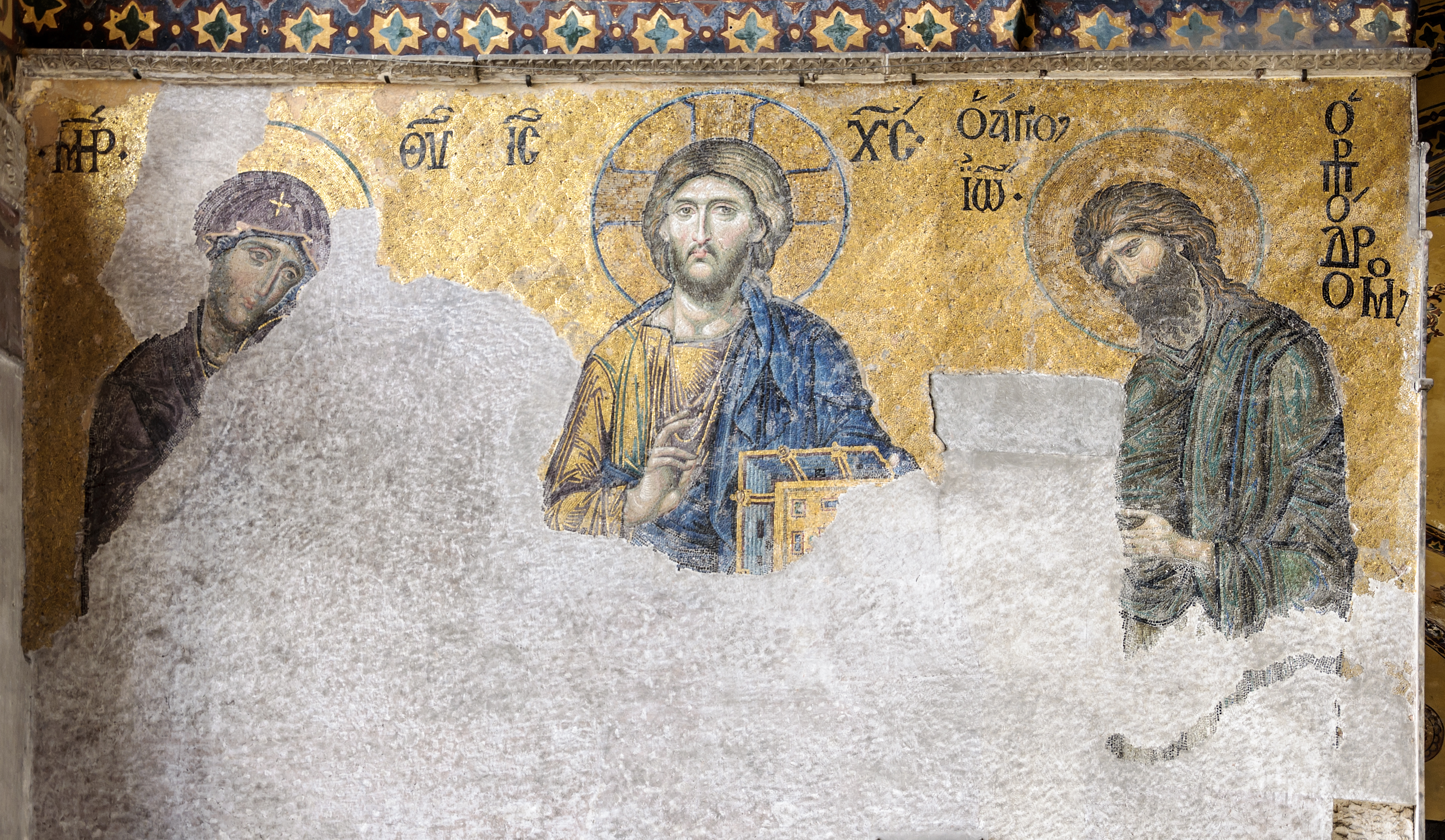
Deesis mosaic (13th-century), from Hagia Sophia.

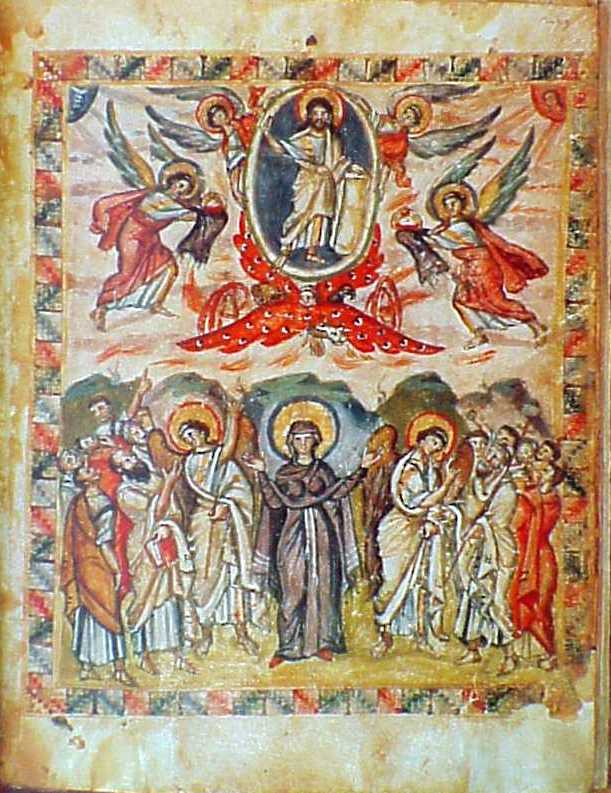
Ascension of Jesus from Rabbula Gospels (6th century).

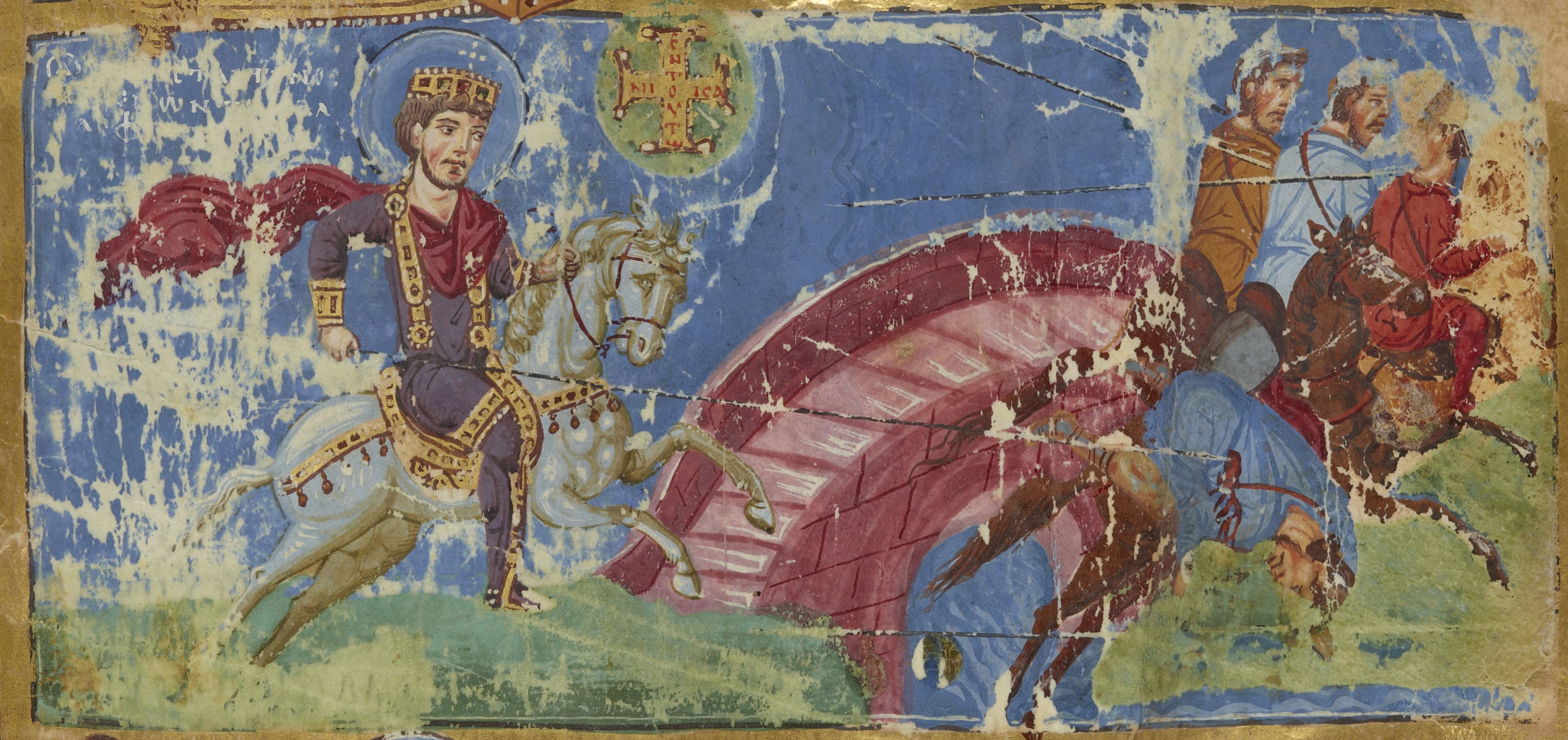
Constantine's Vision and the Battle of the Milvian Bridge, from Paris Gregory (Macedonian, c. 880, BnF).

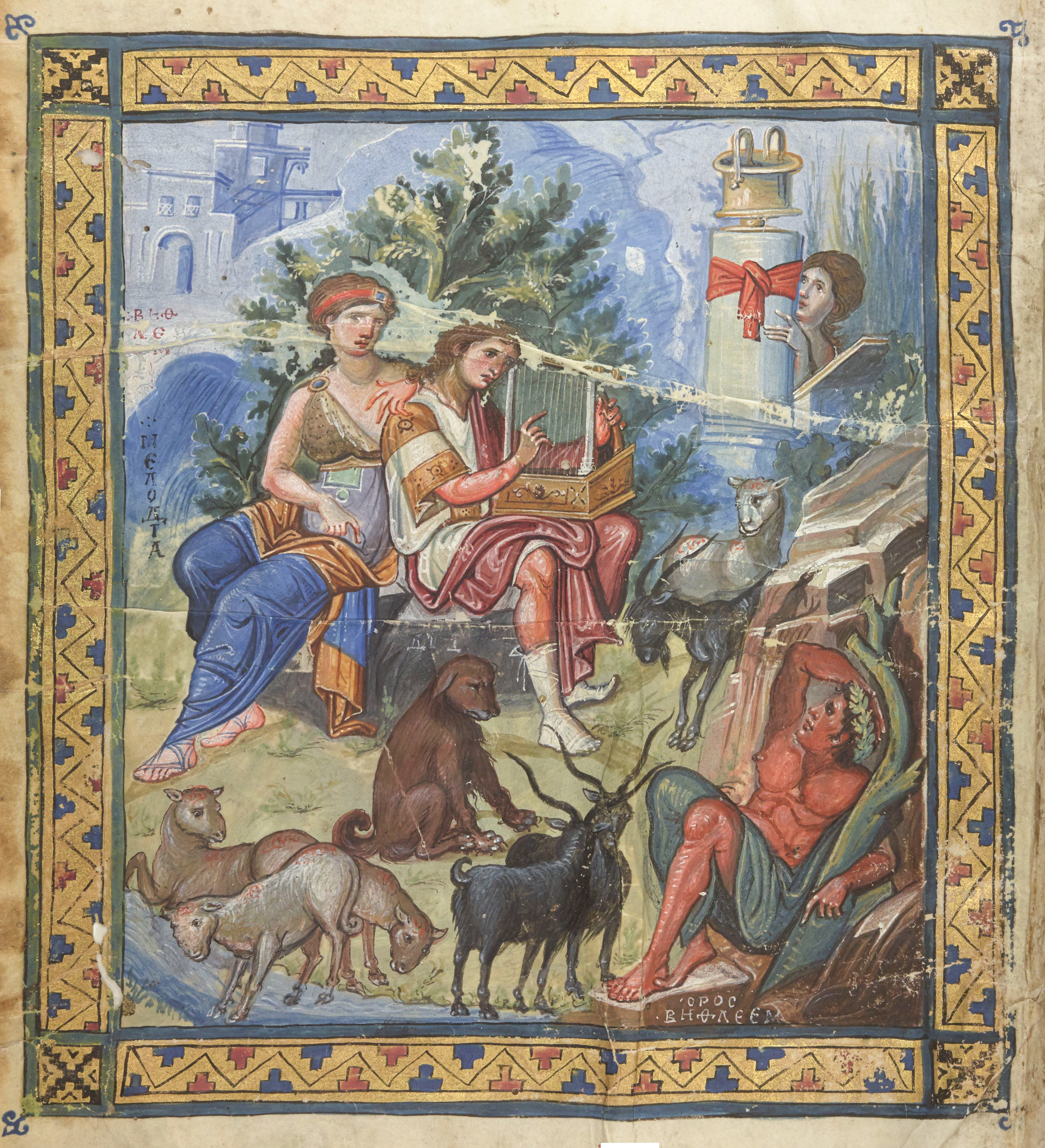
David composing the Psalms, with Melodia behind him, from Paris Psalter (Macedonian, c. 900, BnF).

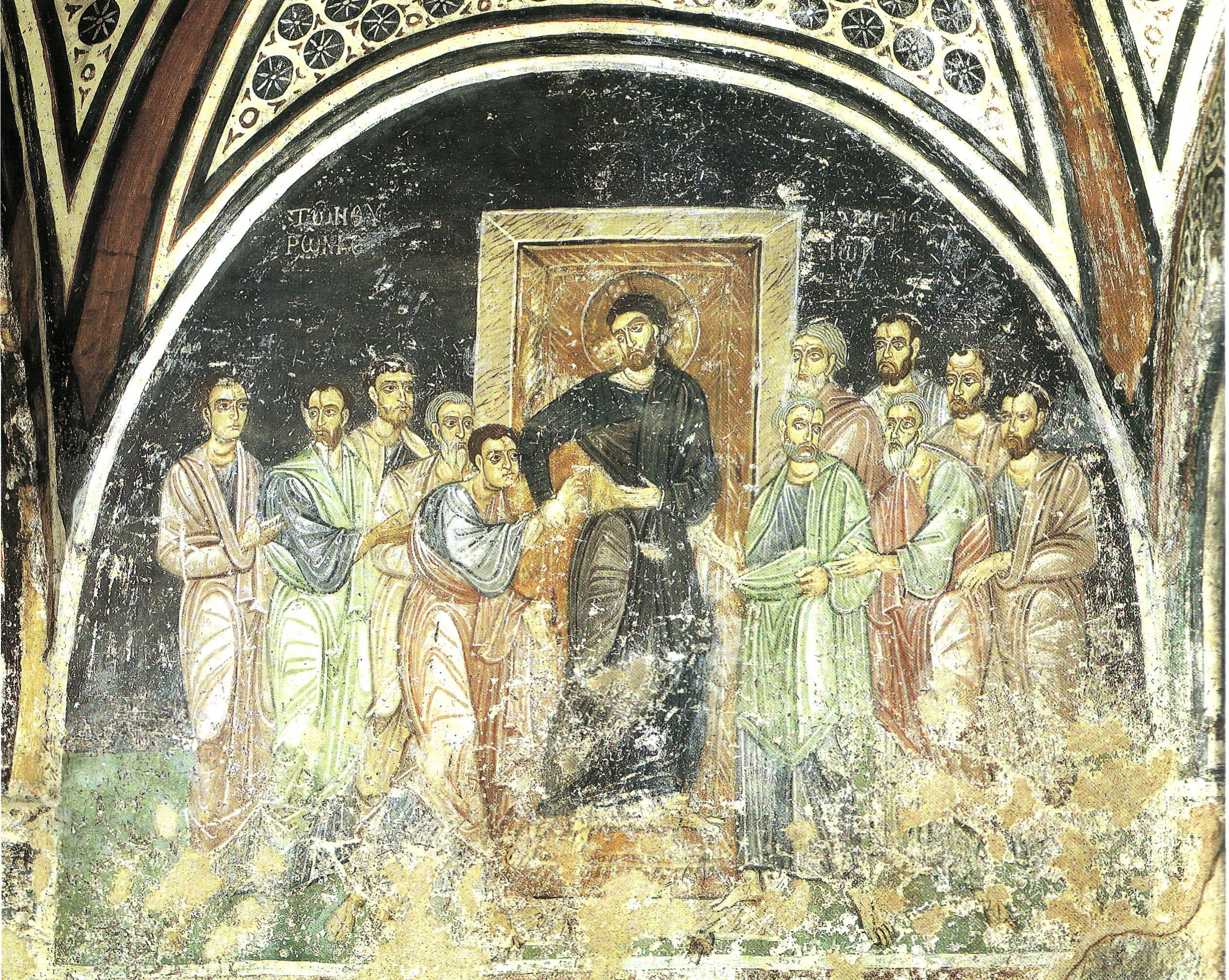
Doubting Thomas fresco from Hosios Loukas (Macedonian, 953)

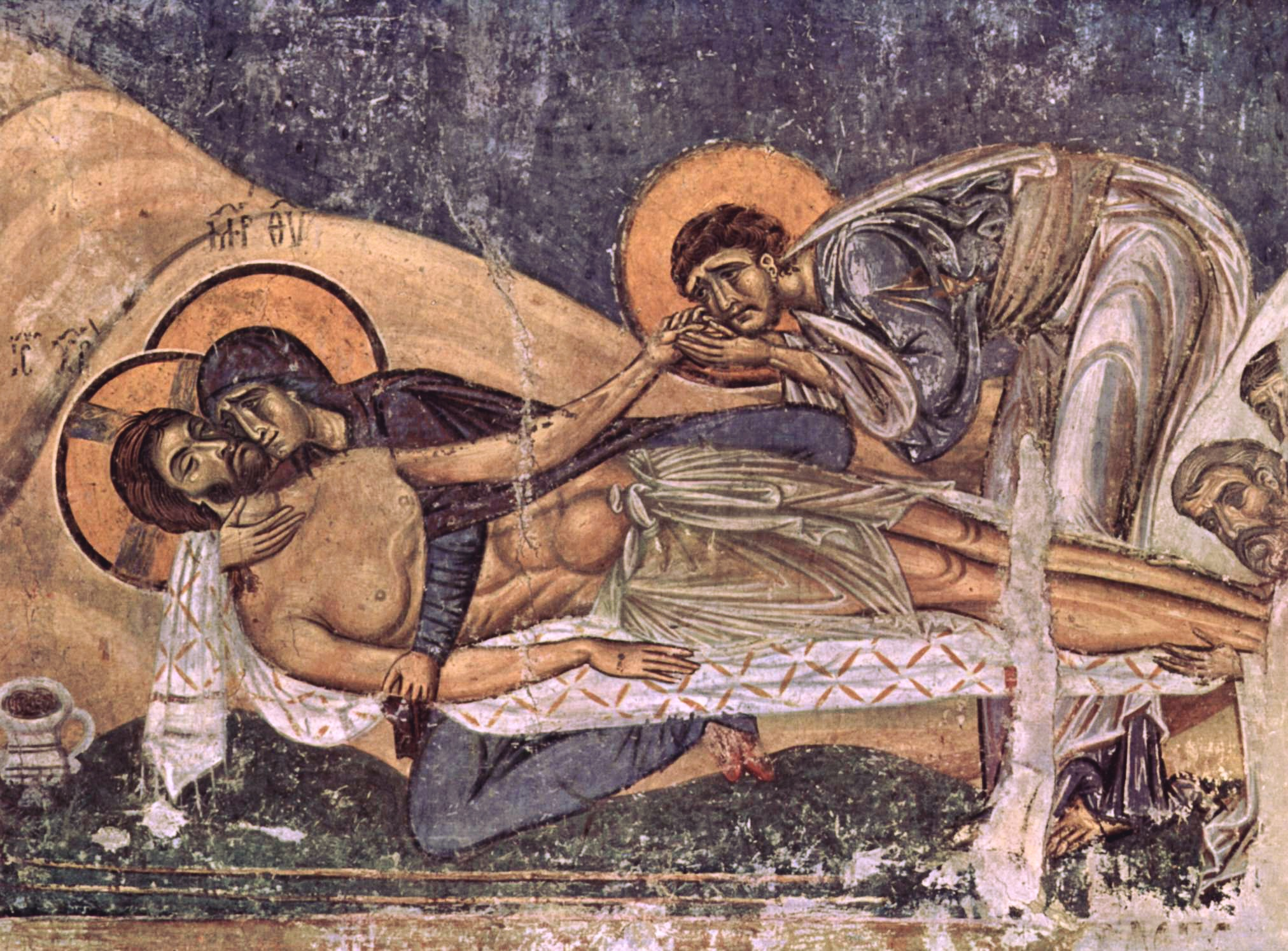
Lamentation from Church of St. Panteleimon (Macedonian, 1164)

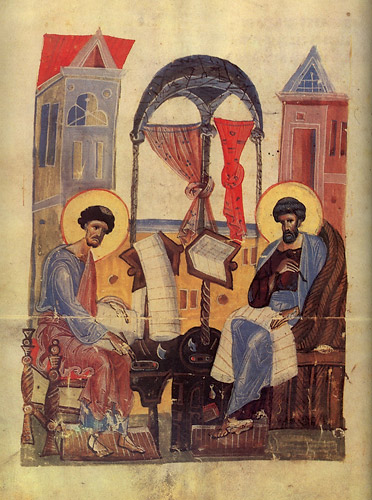
Evangelists Luke and Mark, from Spessky Gospels in Yaroslav (c. 1220s, Yaroslavl Museum-Reserve).

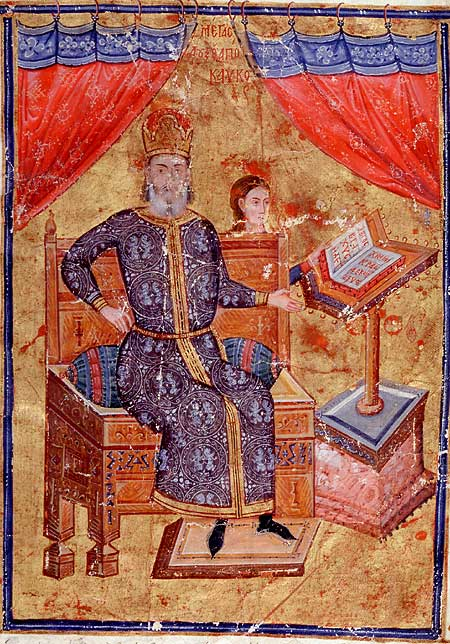
Portrait of the Byzantine megas doux Alexios Apokaukos, from Works of Hippocrates (Palaeologan, c. 1340s, BnF).

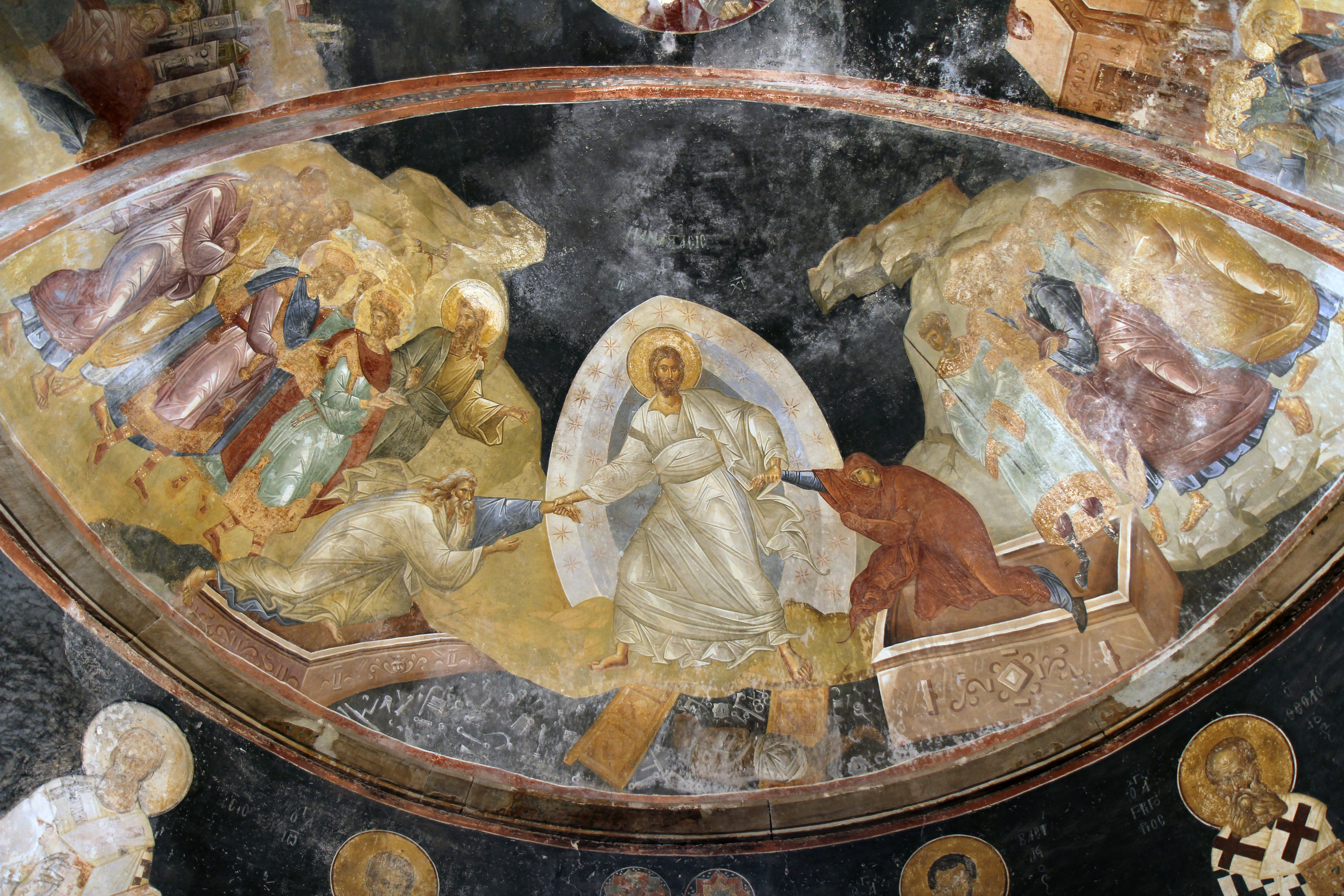
Anastasis fresco (Palaeologan, c. 1320) from Chora Church.

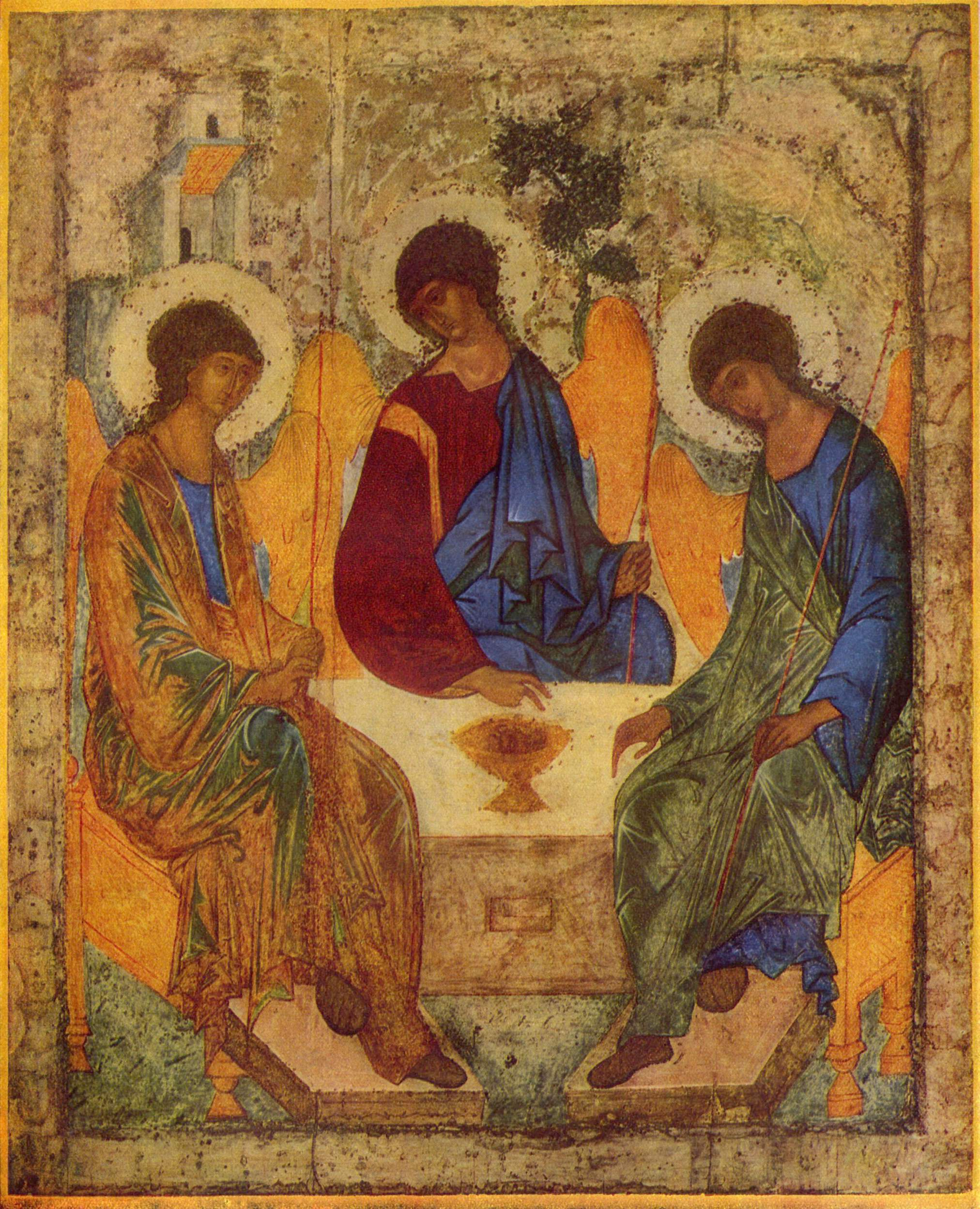
Andrei Rublev, Three angels received by Abraham in Mamra (Palaeologan, c. 1400, Tretyakov Gallery).

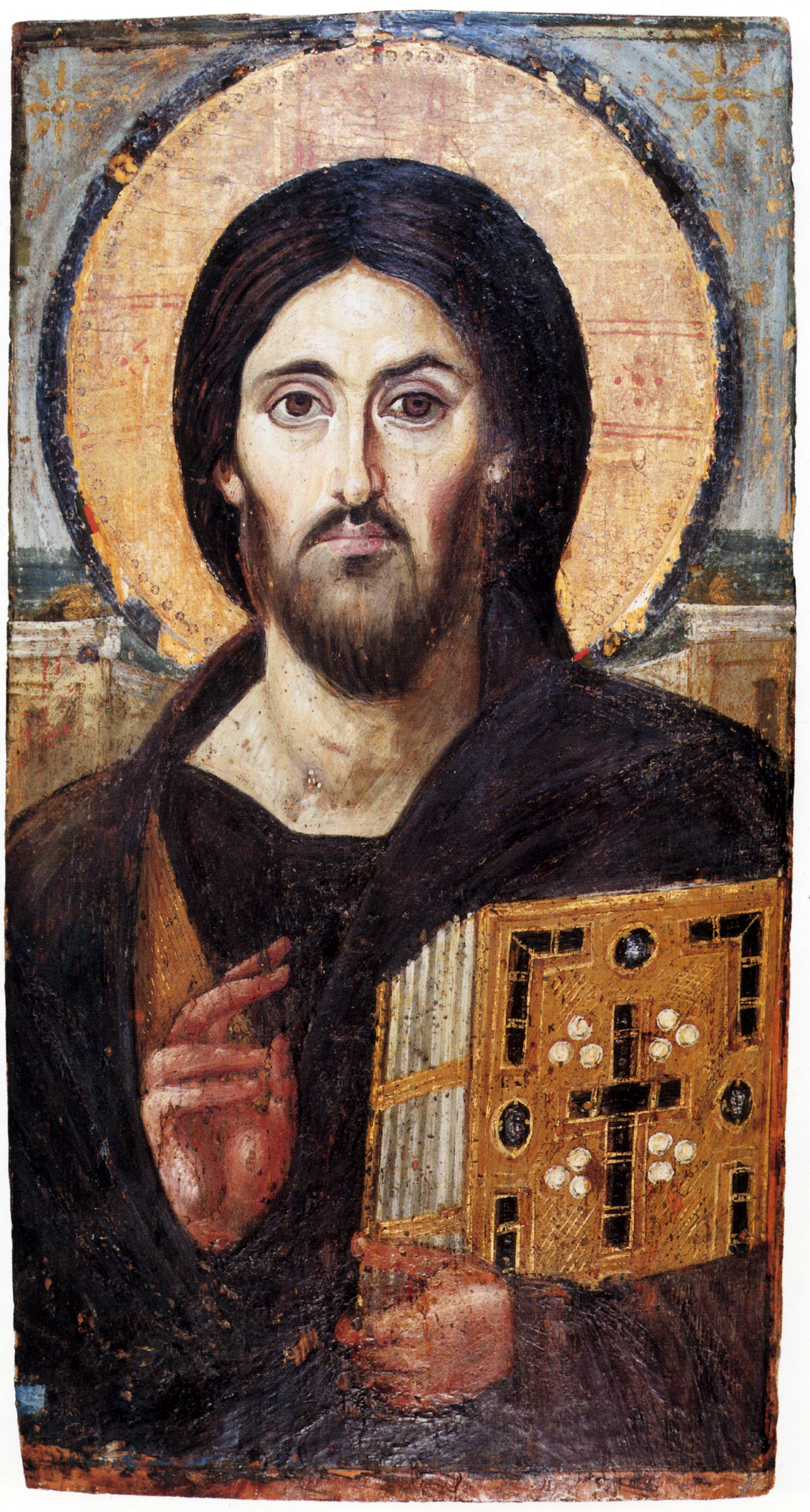
Byzantine icon, Christ Pantocrator (6th century), from Saint Catherine's Monastery.

The fall of Rome (c. 476), and rise of Christianity, including the conversion of emperor Constantine the Great (272–337), (Note: Constantine issued the Edict of Milan (313) tolerating Christianity and Theodosius I issued the Edict of Thessalonica (380) making it the official religion of Rome.) imparted a different spirit and aim to medieval painters, who worked for the church, and a wealthy aristocracy. More copies of illuminated manuscripts are found from the early medieval period.

Byzantine art lasts until the decline of the Byzantine Empire (330–1453) and Fall of Constantinople (1453), with a severe and sacred hieratic style emphasizing traditional Greek and Russian Orthodox iconography.

Fewer frescoes survive than mosaics at places like the Basilica of San Vitale (547) and Hagia Sophia (537). While Byzantine art is typically flat and highly stylized; Macedonian Renaissance (867–1056) art is more naturalistic, like at Hosios Loukas (953) and Church of St. Panteleimon (1164).

Theophanes the Greek (c. 1340–c. 1410) taught Russian icon painter Andrei Rublev (c. 1360–c. 1430), who with colleague Daniel Chorny (c. 1350–1430) influenced Novgorod and Moscow painters; who advanced Byzantine art during the empire's final period known as the Palaeologan Renaissance (1261–1453). Byzantine emperor Manuel II Palaiologos (1350–1425) painted icons. Chora Church has some of the best preserved Palaeologan frescoes.

=== Insular, Carolingian, and Ottonian painting ===
Image Gallery (Click "Show" to view)
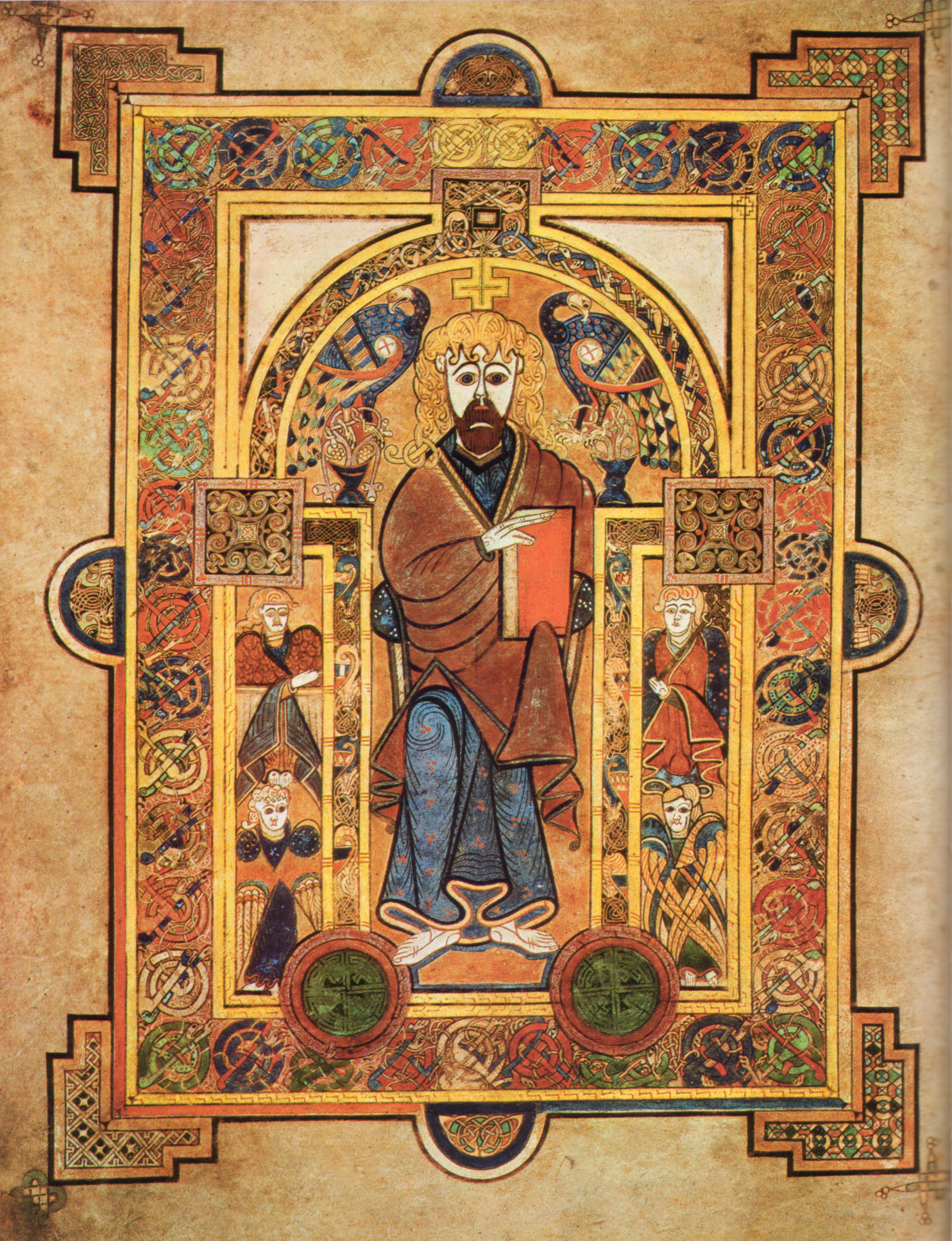
Christ Enthroned from Book of Kells (Insular, c. 800, Trinity College Dublin).

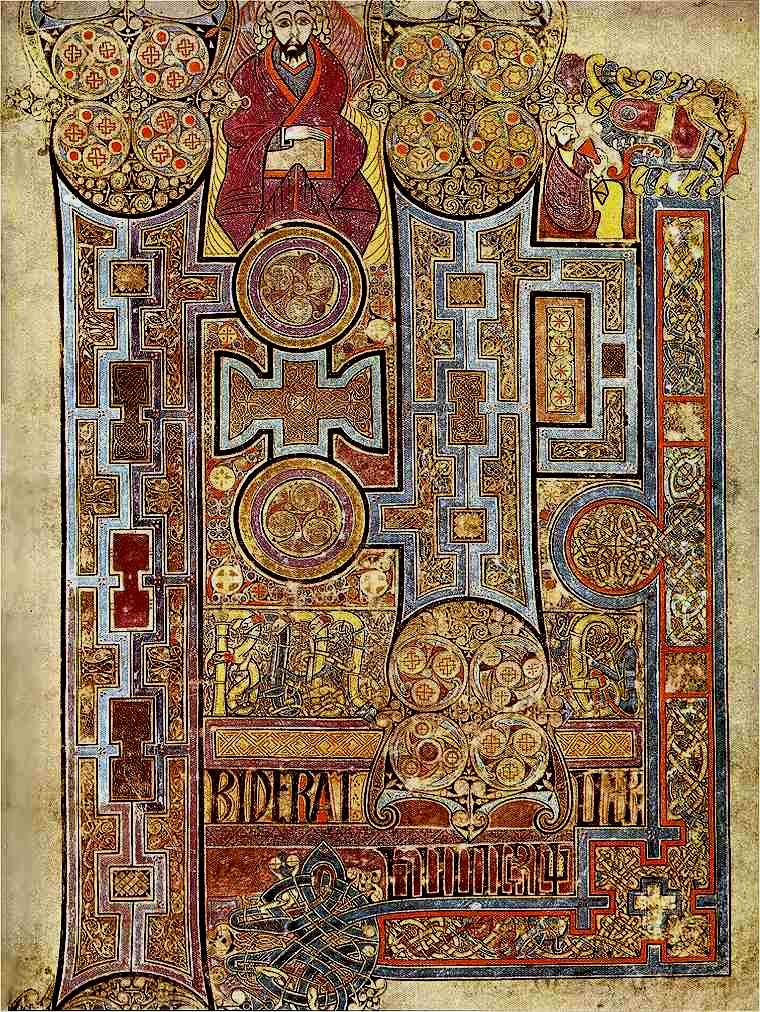
Incipit to Gospel of John from Book of Kells (Insular, c. 800, Trinity College Dublin).

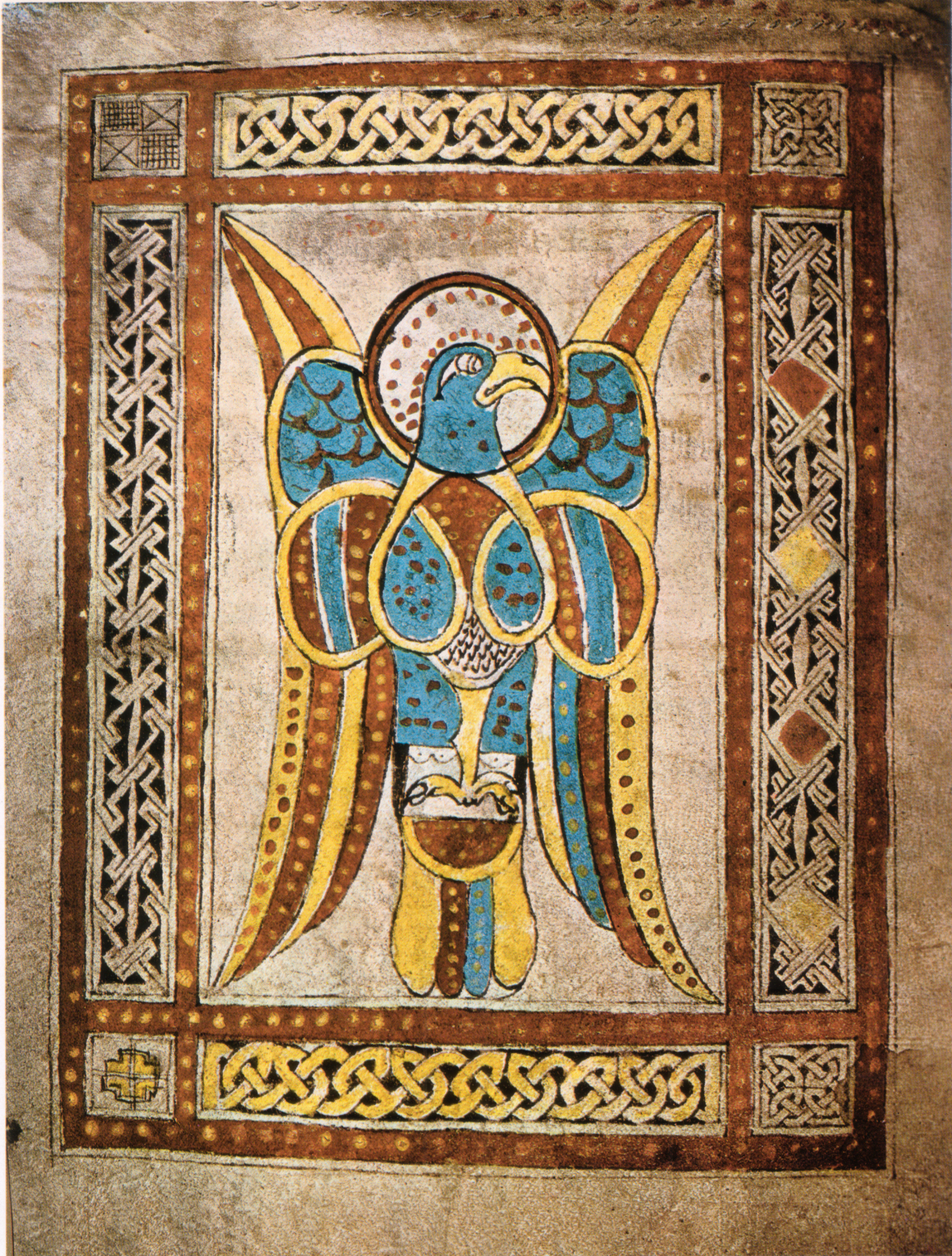
The Eagle of John from Book of Dimma (Insular, c. 800, Trinity College Dublin).

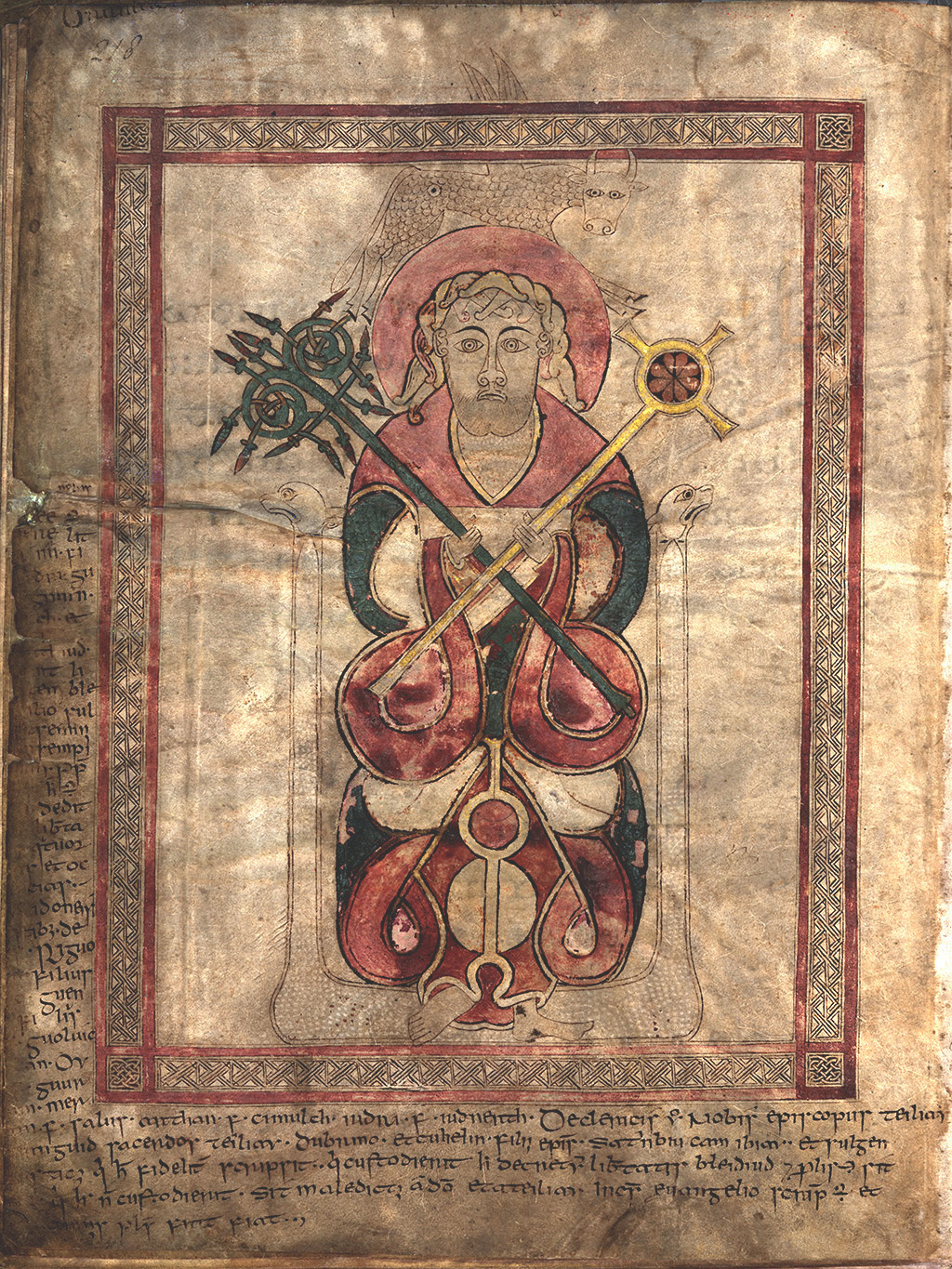
Saint Luke from Lichfield Gospels (Insular, c. 730).

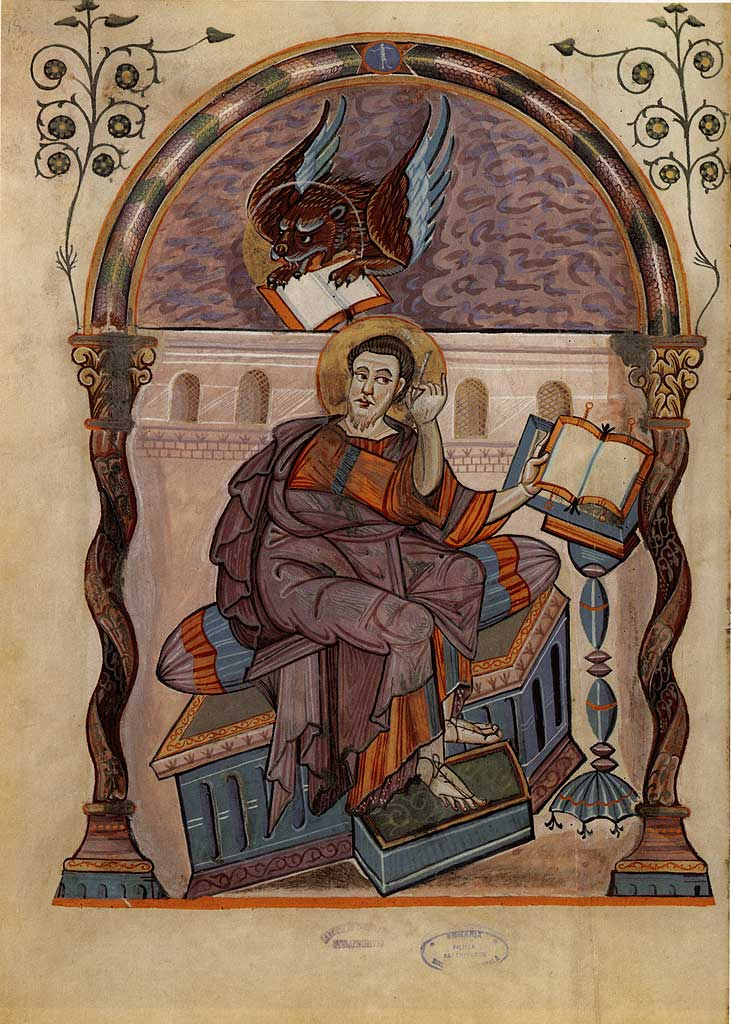
Saint Mark listening to the winged lion, from the Lorsch Gospels (Carolingian, c. 800, Vatican Library).

Saint Matthew from Vienna Coronation Gospels, (Carolingian, 9th century, Kunsthistorisches Museum)

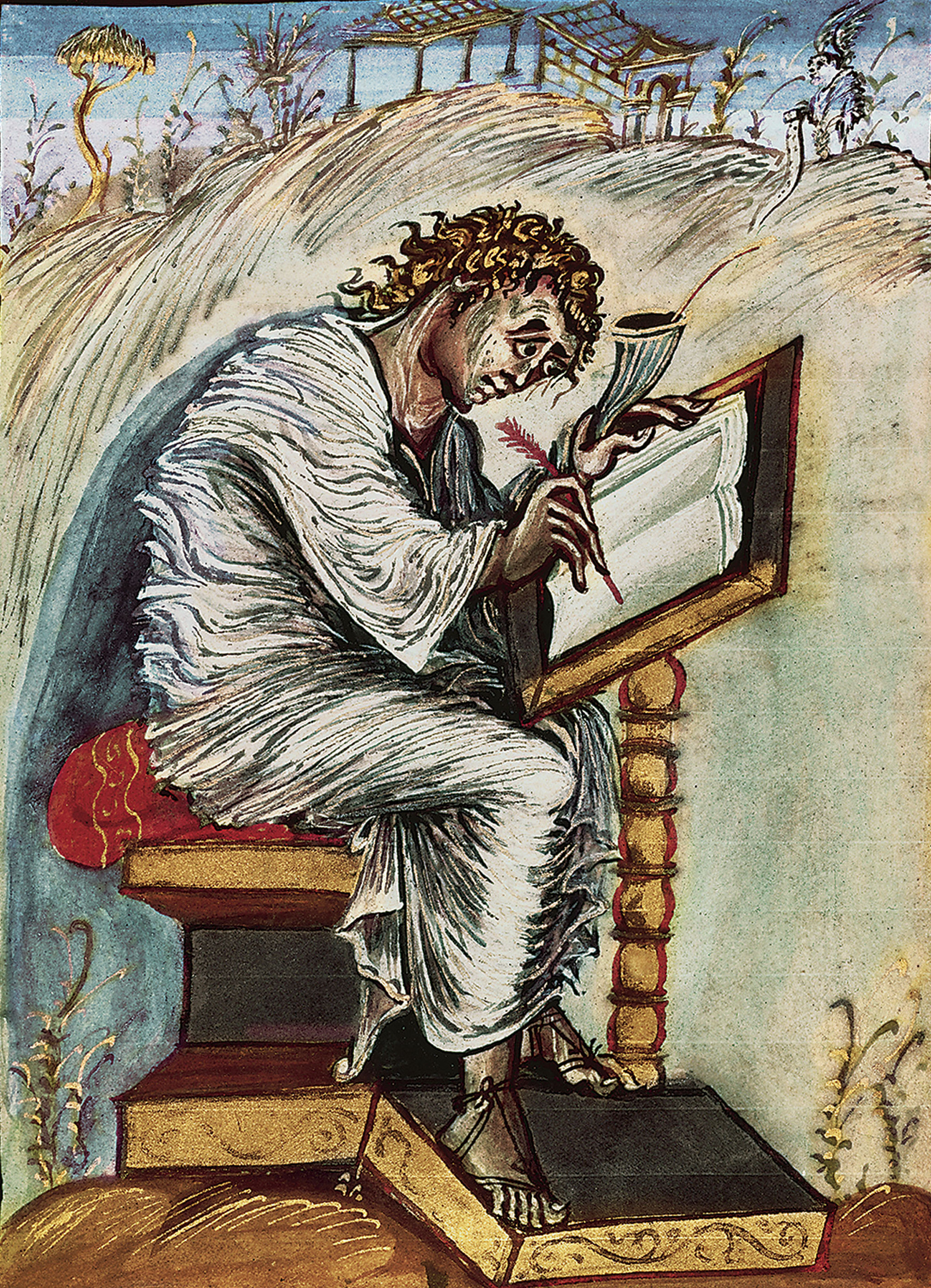
Saint Matthew from Ebbo Gospels (Carolingian, c. 825, Bibliothèque municipale d’Épernay).

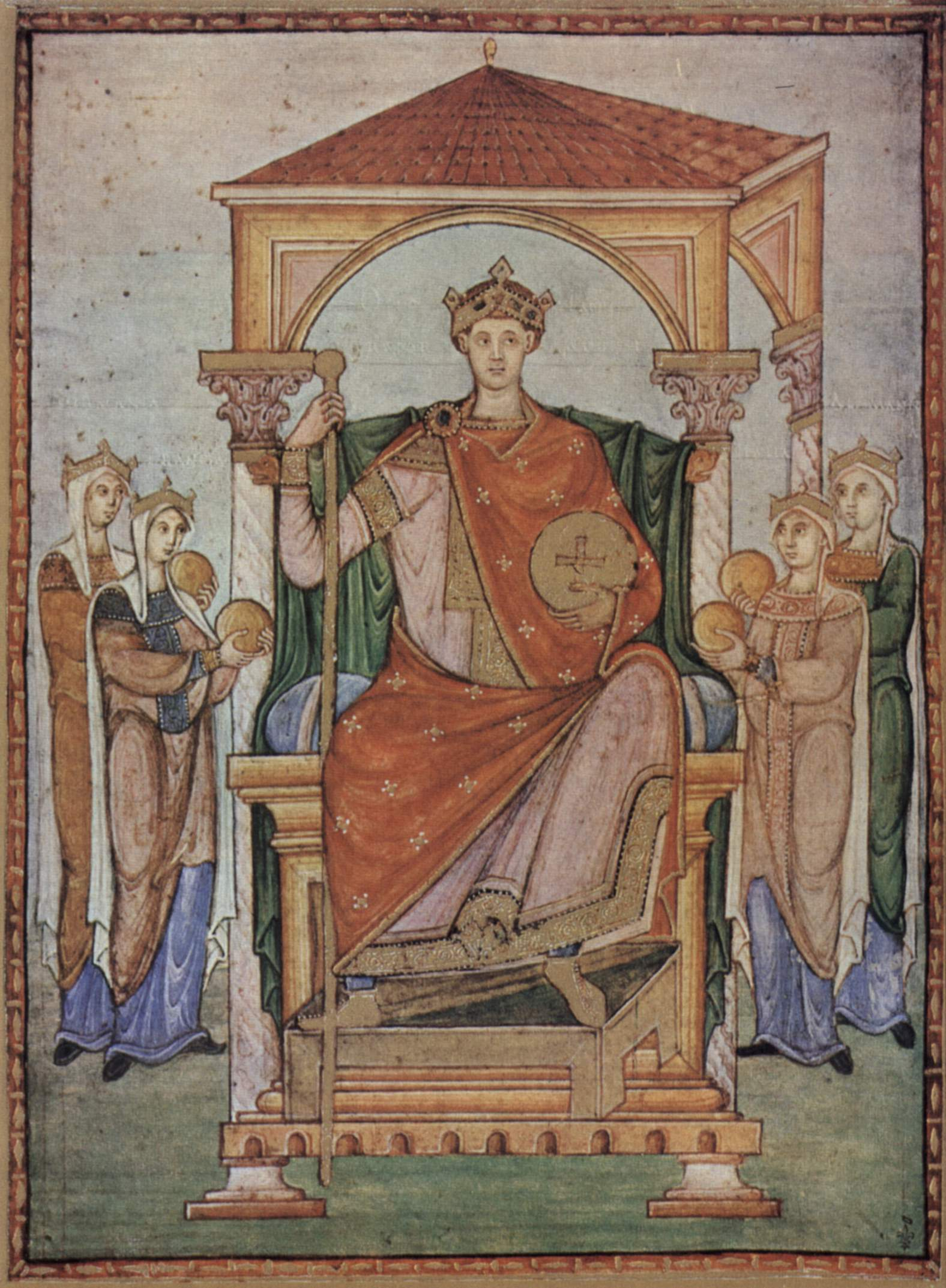
The Gregory Master, Otto II (Ottonian, c. 985, Musée Condé).

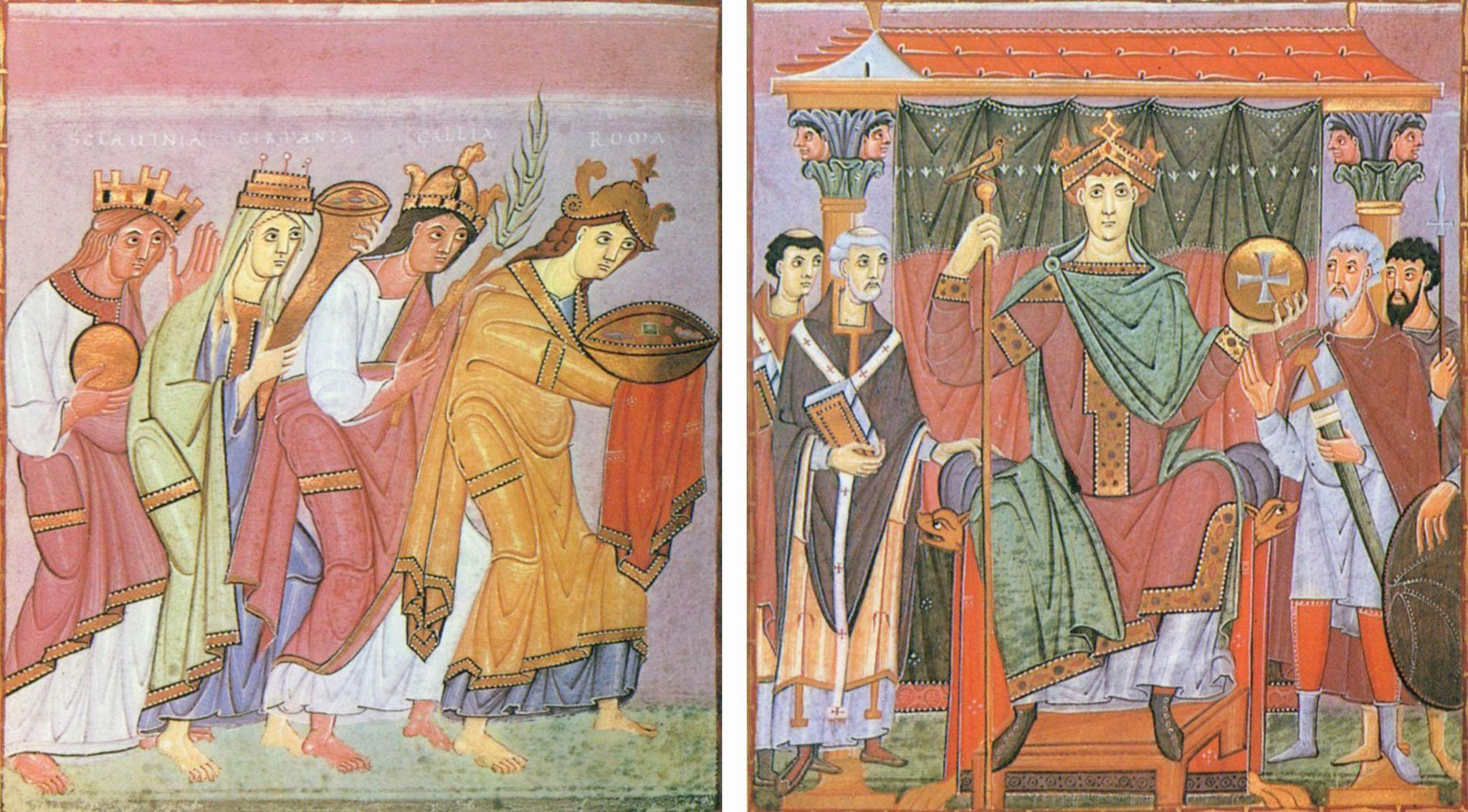
A Master of the Reichenau School, "Roma", "Gallia", "Germania" and "Sclavinia" pay homage to Otto III (Ottonian, c. 1000, Bavarian State Library), from the Gospels of Otto III, one of the Liuthar Gospels.

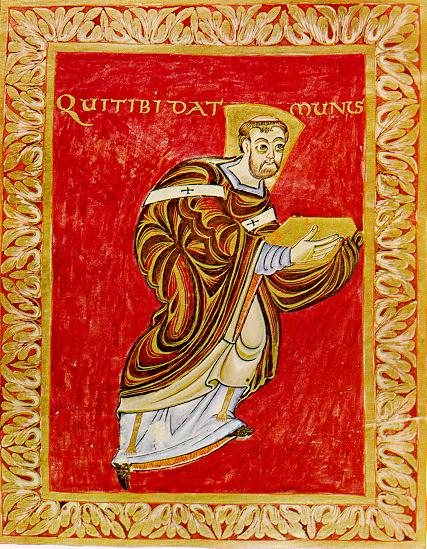
Dedicatory miniature from Egbert Psalter (Ottonian, c. 990, National Archaeological Museum of Cividale del Friuli) showing Egbert.

In medieval, Catholic Europe, the first distinctive painting style was Insular art from the British Isles, surviving only in miniatures from Illuminated manuscripts such as the Book of Kells (c. 800), best known for their abstract decoration and Evangelist portraits.

Influenced by classical, Byzantine, and Insular art, Carolingian paintings of the Carolingian Renaissance during the reign of Charlemagne (748–814) and his heirs, and Ottonian paintings of the Ottonian Renaissance during the Ottonian dynasty (919–1024), are sometimes known as "pre-Romanesque". They survive mostly in manuscripts, although some of several documented wall paintings remain, such as at Saint John Abbey, Müstair. Archbishop of Trier Egbert (c. 950–993) was a notable patron of paintings.

=== High Middle Ages ===
Image Gallery (Click "Show" to view)
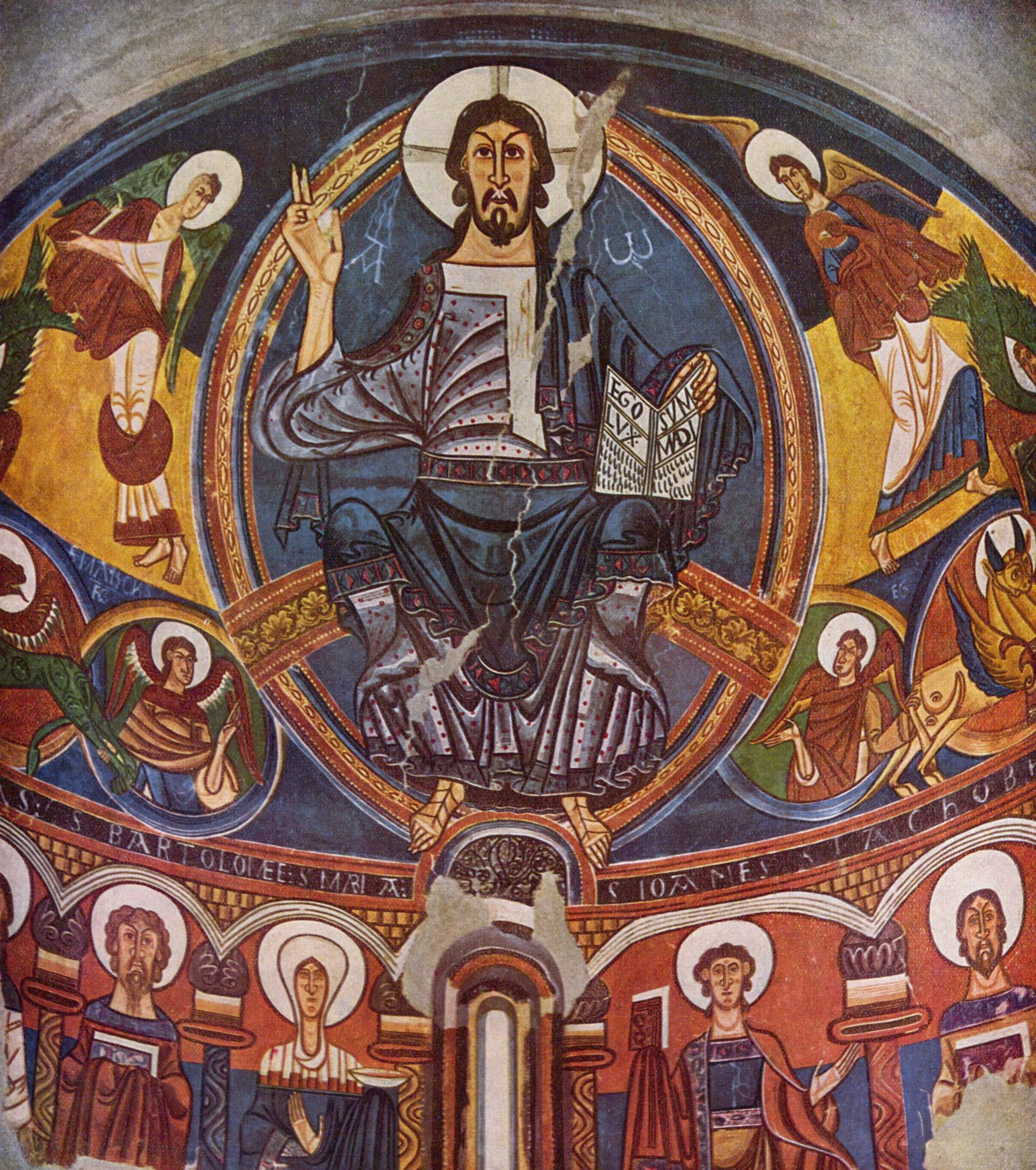
The Master of Taüll, Christ Pantocrator (c. 1123) from the Apse of Sant Climent de Taüll, surrounded by the mandorla.

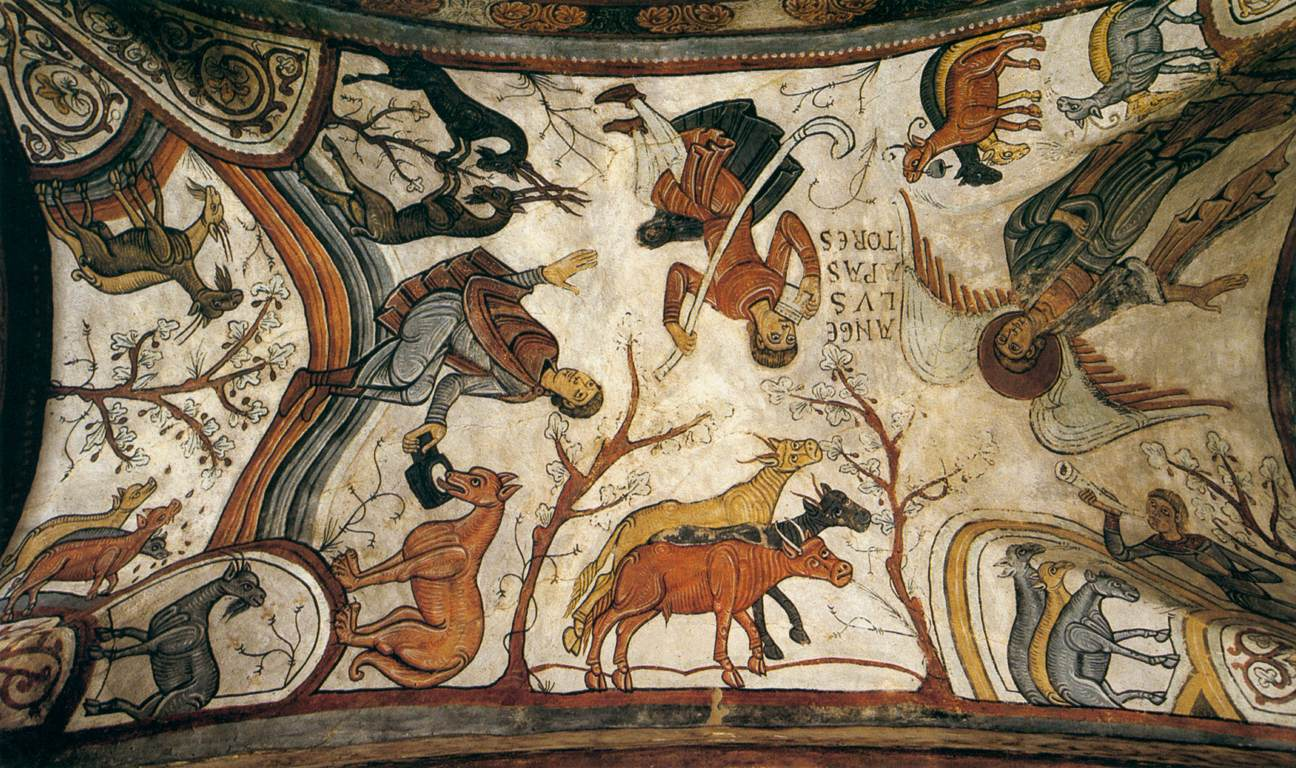
An anonymous master, The Annunciation to the Shepherds (c. 1180) from Royal Panteon of San Isidoro.

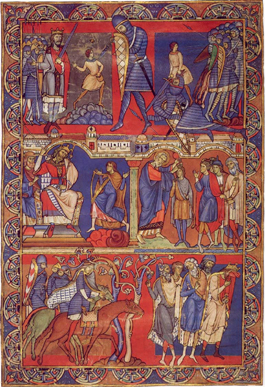
The Morgan Leaf, scenes from the life of David, from the Winchester Bible (c. 1160–75, Morgan Library & Museum).

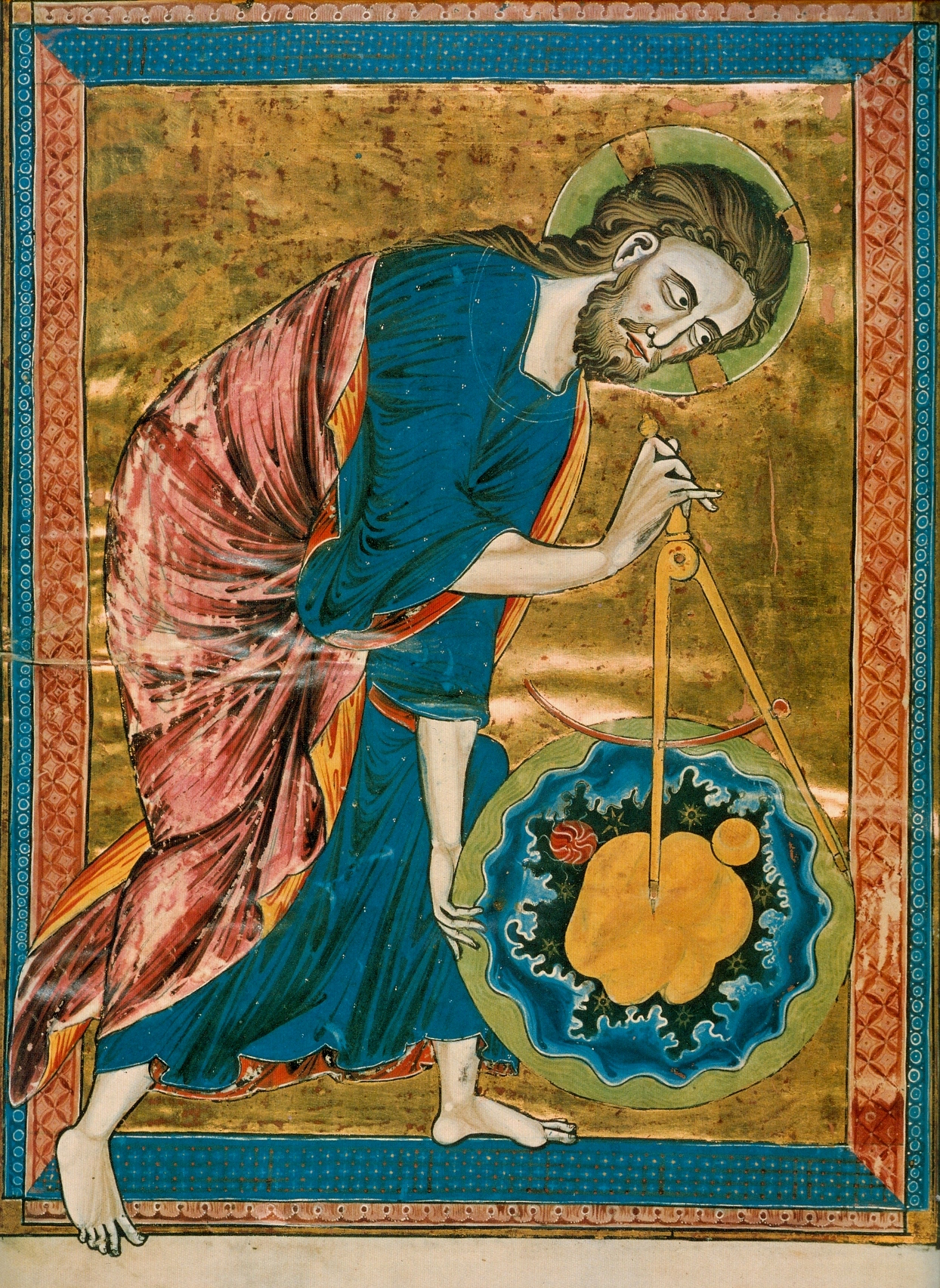
God the Geometer, from frontispiece of Bible moralisée (c. 1220, Austrian National Library). Note the foot out of frame.

The High Middle Ages and 12th-century renaissance birthed similarly influenced Romanesque and Gothic art, first introduced in Milan. Church walls were decorated with frescoes, and windows using colorful stained glass, such as at Chartres Cathedral and the Cathedral of Notre Dame. Many of the few remaining murals share themes of Insular art. Far more miniatures in Illuminated manuscripts survive from the period, which also had Mappa mundi painter-cartographers, such as Matthew Paris (c. 1200–1259).

==== Italo-Byzantine ====
Image Gallery (Click "Show" to view)
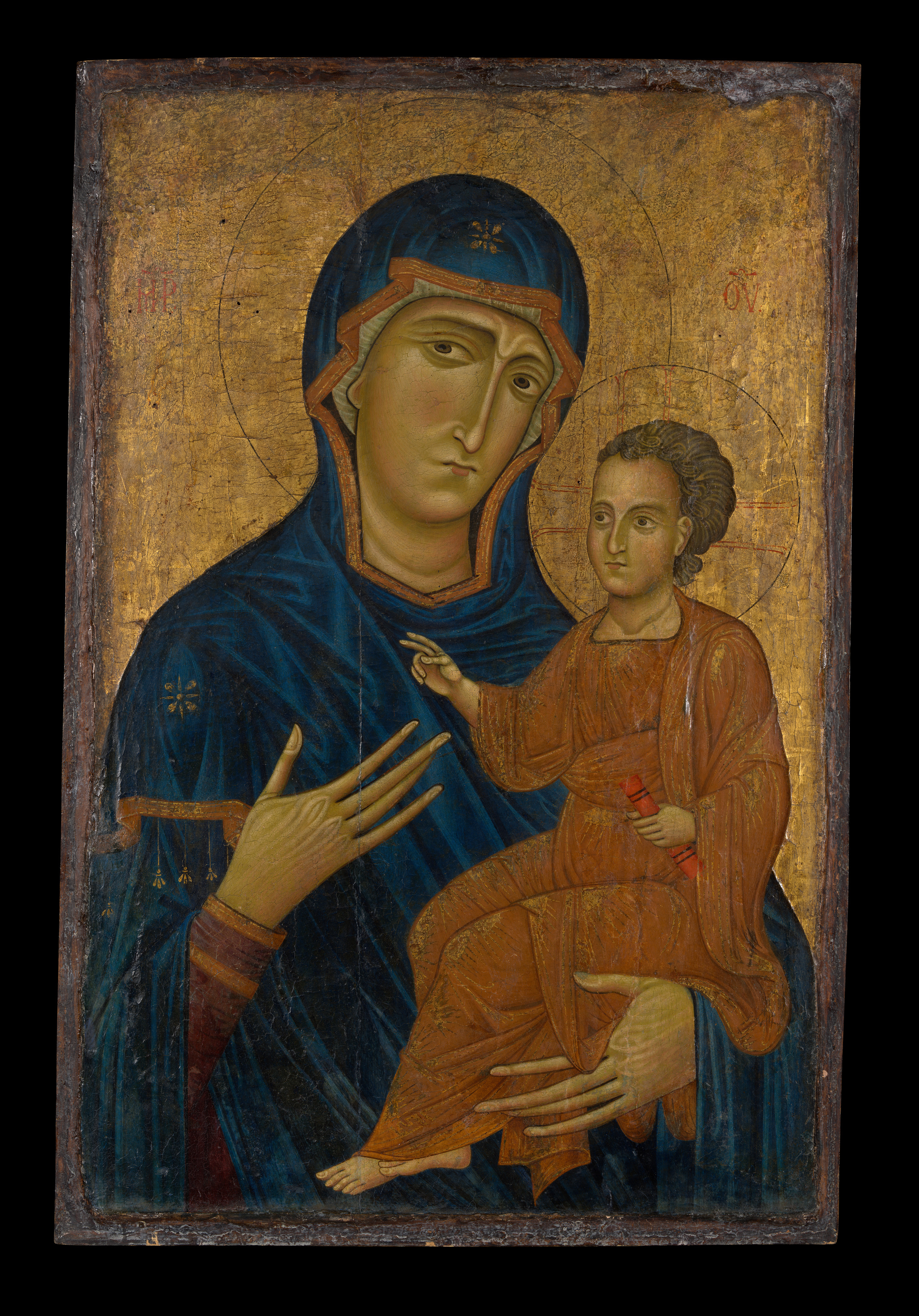
Berlinghiero, Madonna and child (c. 1230, Metropolitan Museum of Art).

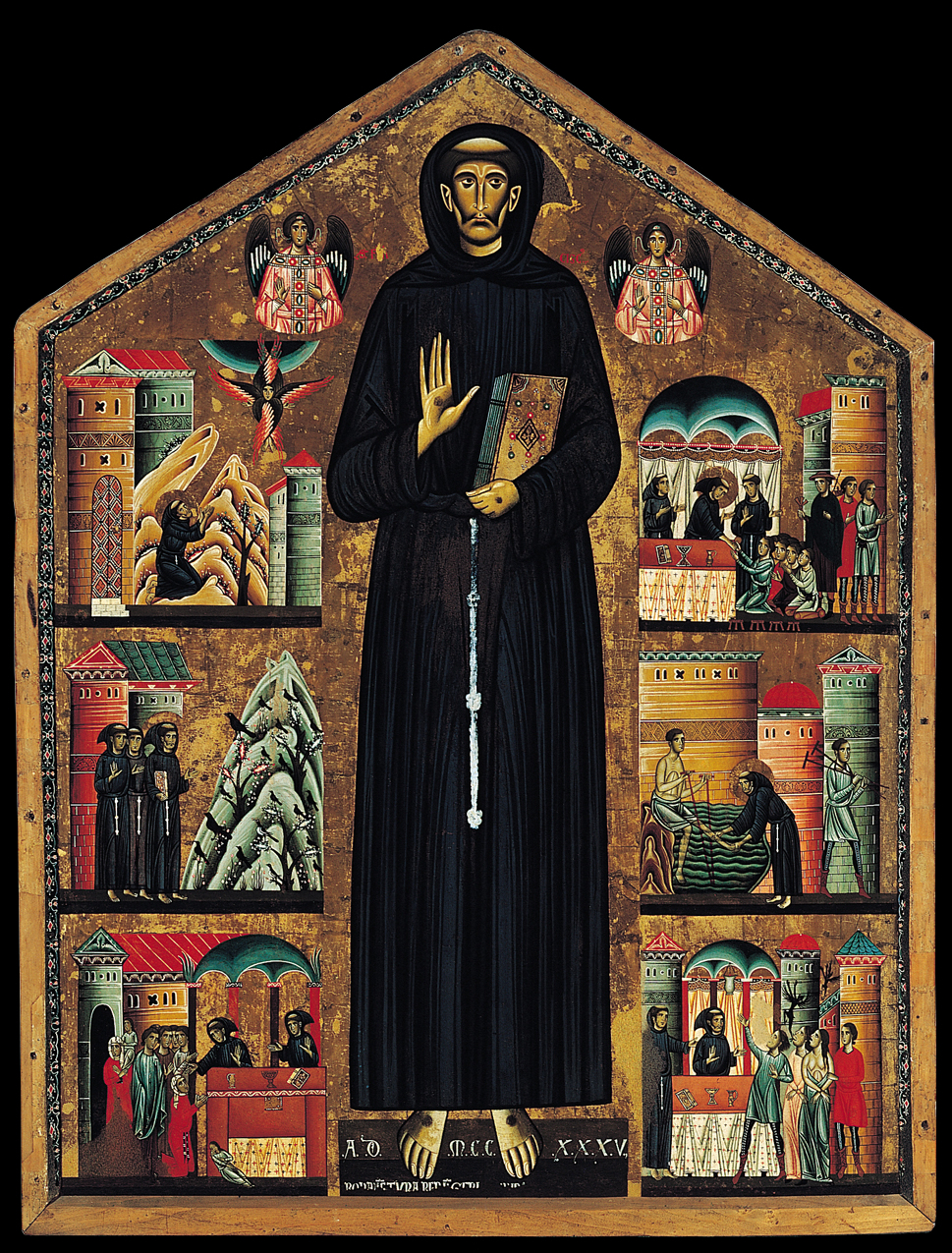
Bonaventura Berlinghieri, St Francis of Assisi (1235) from Church of St. Francis.

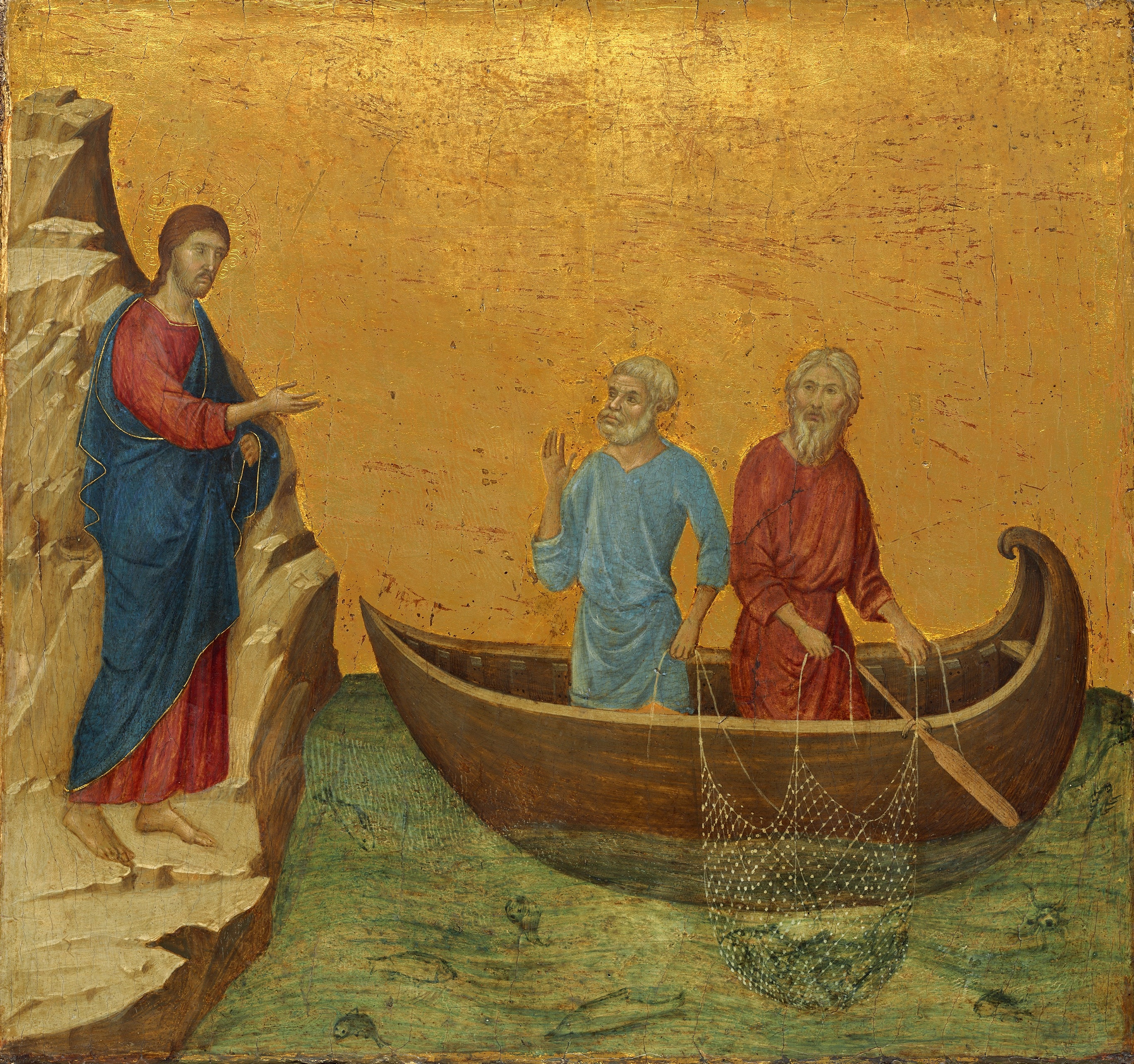
Duccio, The Calling of the Apostles Peter and Andrew (1308, National Gallery of Art)

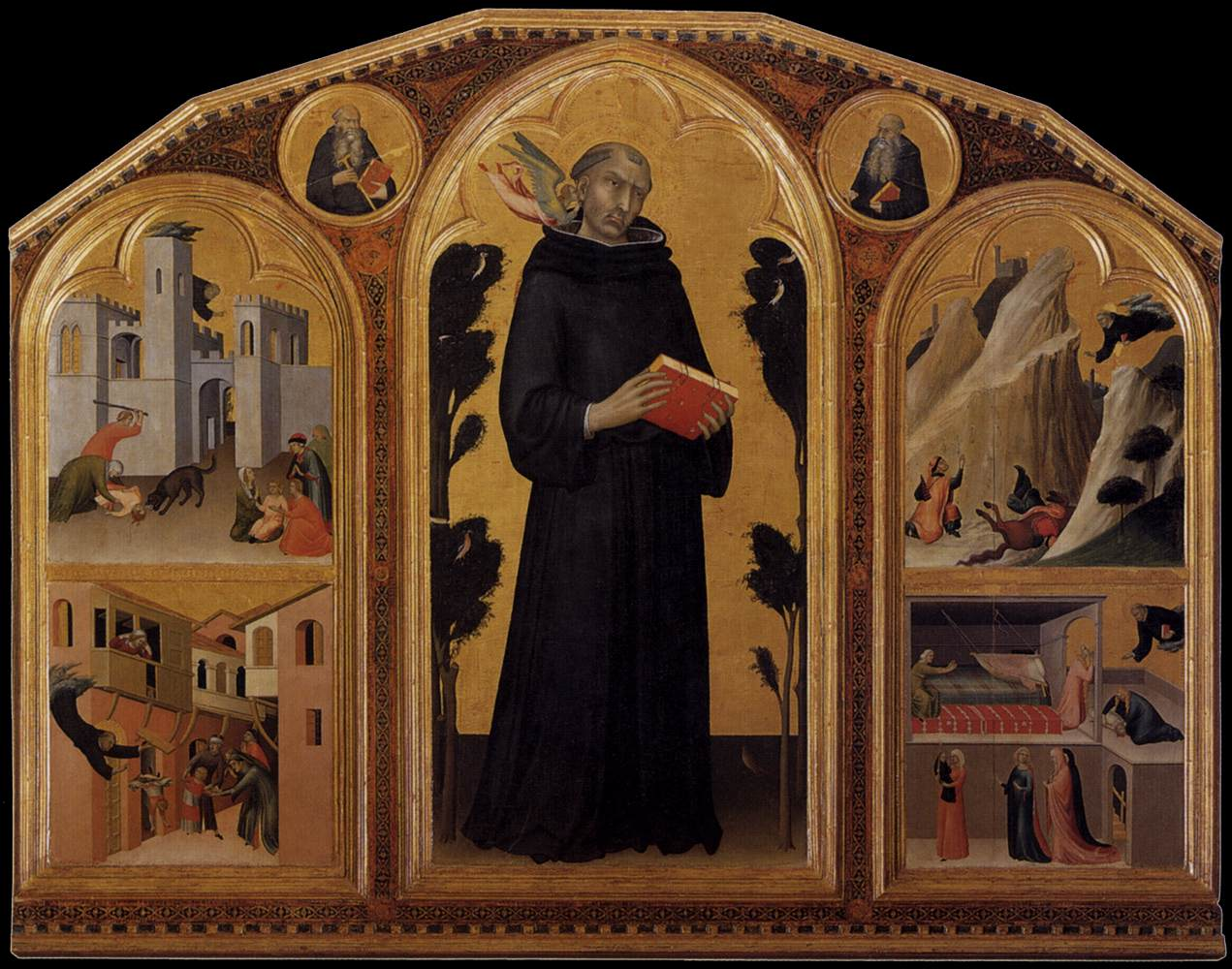
Simone Martini, Blessed Agostino Novello Triptych (c. 1326, Pinacoteca Nazionale)

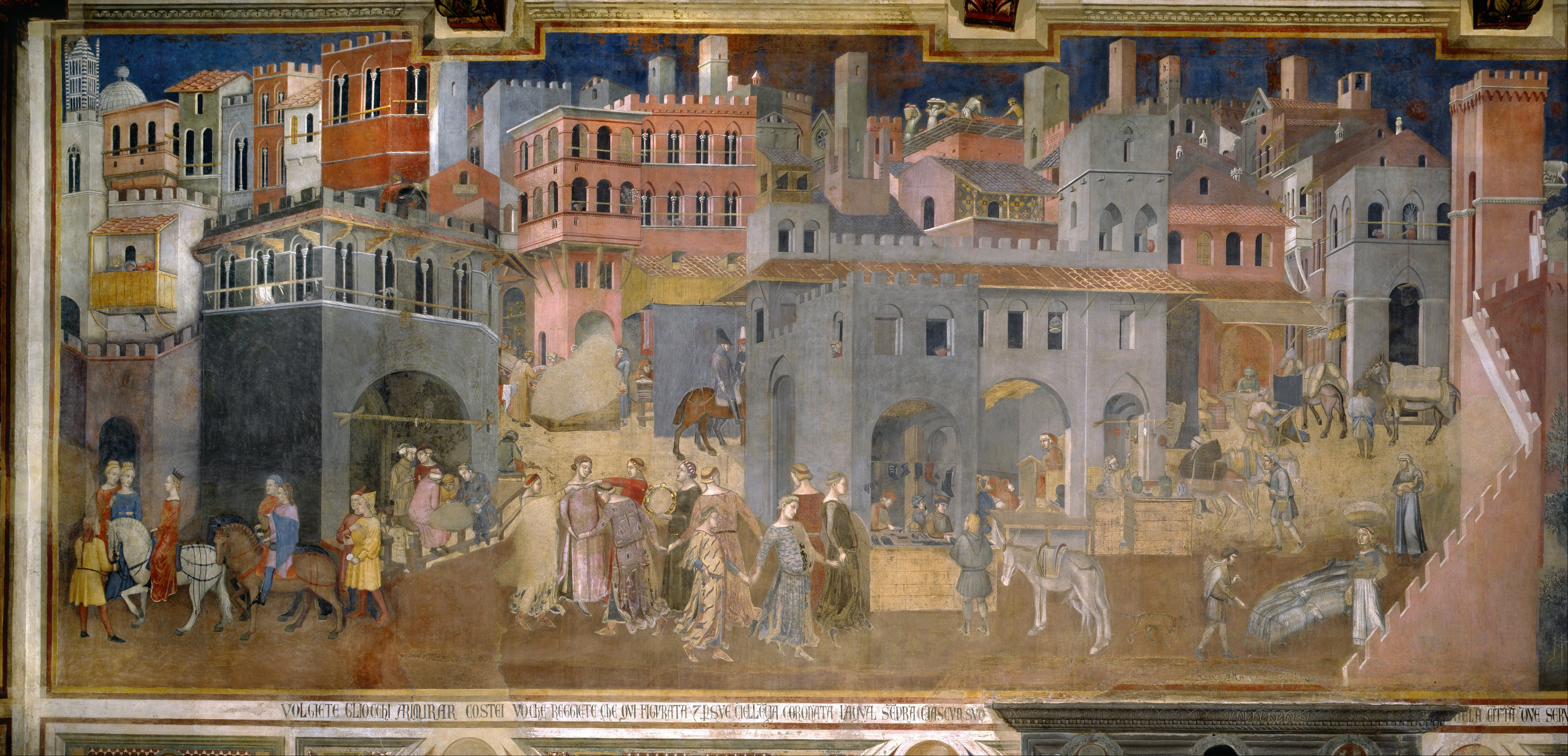
Ambrogio Lorenzetti, Effect of Good Government in the City, from The Allegory of Good and Bad Government (c. 1340) frescoes in the Palazzo Pubblico.

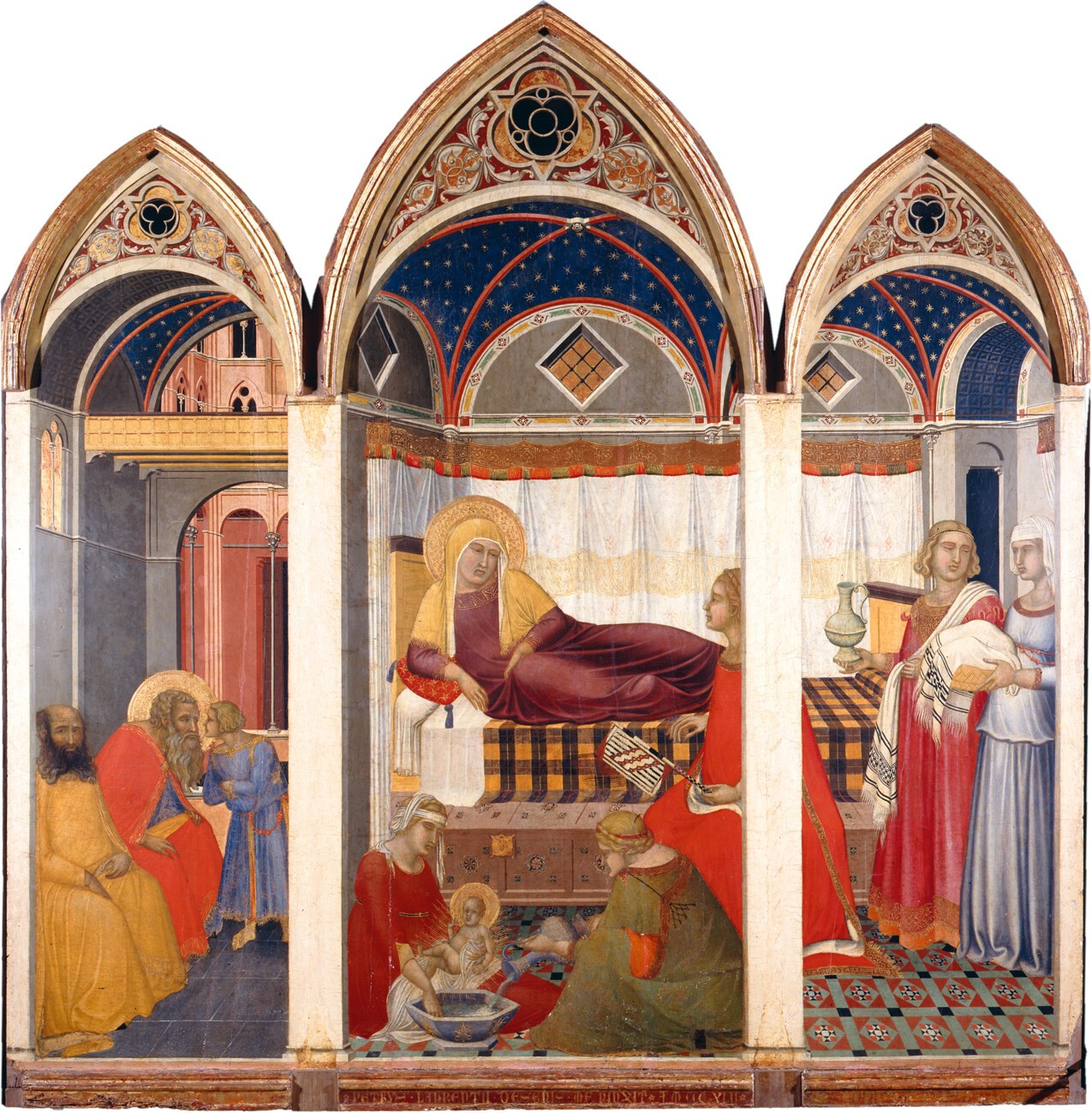
Pietro Lorenzetti, Nativity of the Virgin (c. 1340, Museo dell'Opera del Duomo).

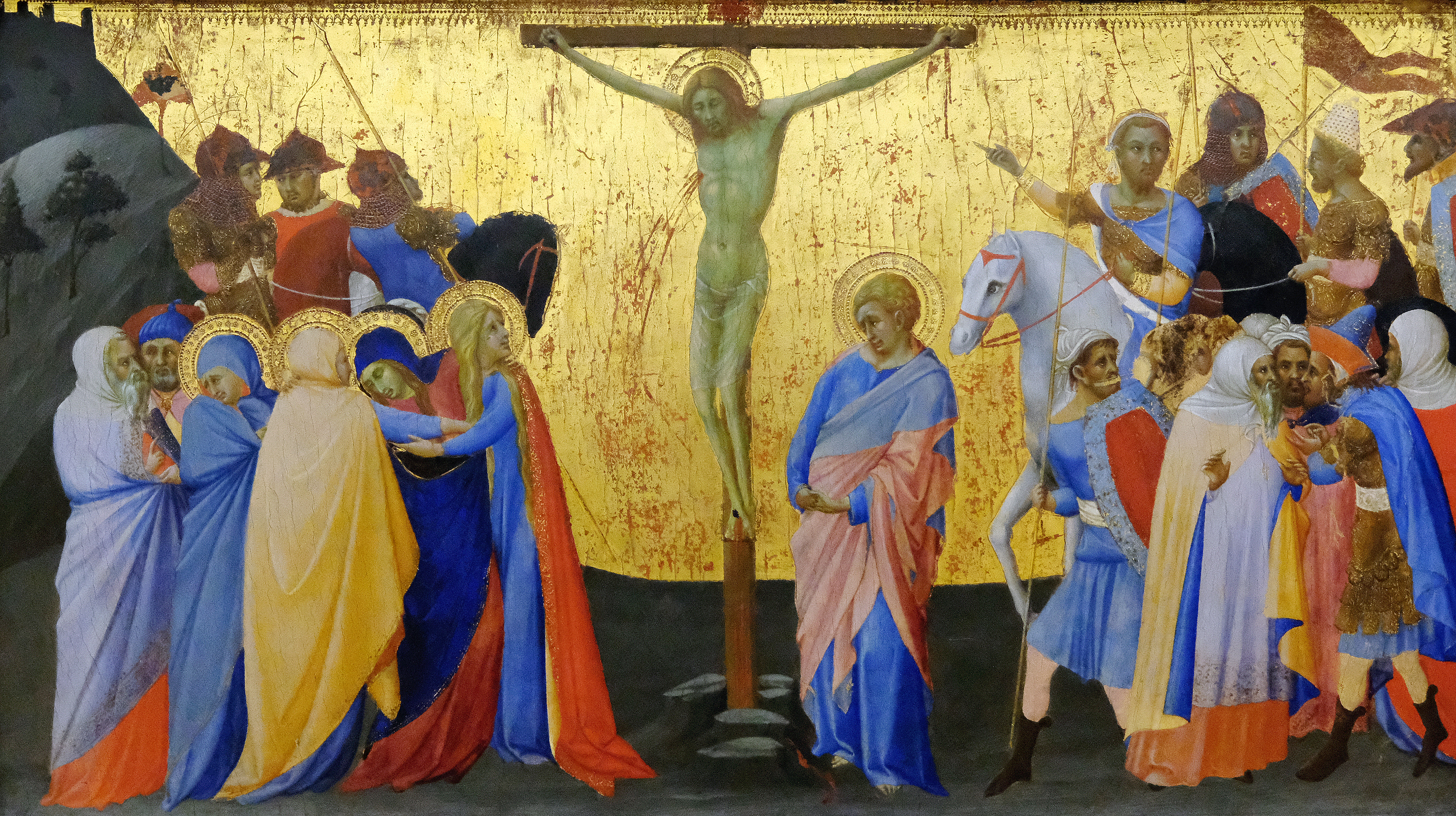
Bartolomeo Bulgarini, La Crucifixion (c. 1350s, Louvre).

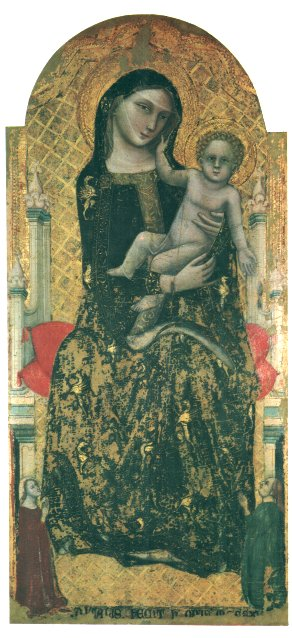
Vitale da Bologna, Madonna and child (c. 1345, Davia Bargellini Museum)

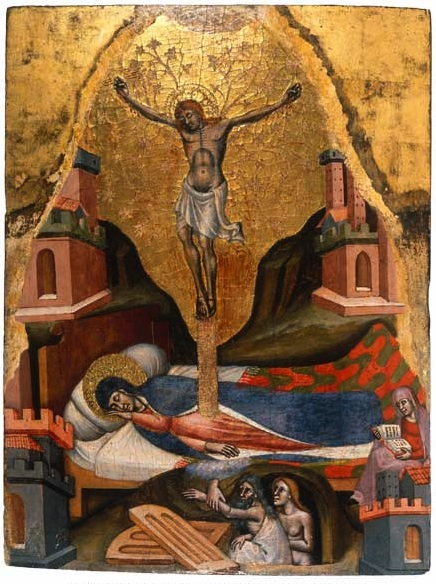
Simone dei Crocifissi, Dream of the Virgin (1365, National Gallery)

Panel painting becomes more common during the Romanesque period, under the heavy influence of Byzantine icons, such as from Italo-Byzantine artists like Berlinghiero (fl. 1228–1242), father of Barone (fl. 1228–1282), Bonaventura (fl. 1235–1244), and Marco (fl. 1232–1255).

Byzantine art influenced the Sienese school led by Duccio (c. 1260–1319) and his pupil Simone Martini (c. 1284–1344). The Sienese School also included the naturalism of brothers Ambrogio (c. 1290–1348) and Pietro Lorenzetti (c. 1280–1348), plus Bartolomeo Bulgarini (c. 1300–1378). Bologna featured painters such as Vitale da Bologna (c. 1309–1360). Vitale influenced his successor Andrea da Bologna and Simone dei Crocifissi (c. 1330–1399), whose nephew was Lippo di Dalmasio (1352–c. 1410). Lucchese school painting is mostly anonymous.

==== Proto-Renaissance ====
Image Gallery (Click "Show" to view)
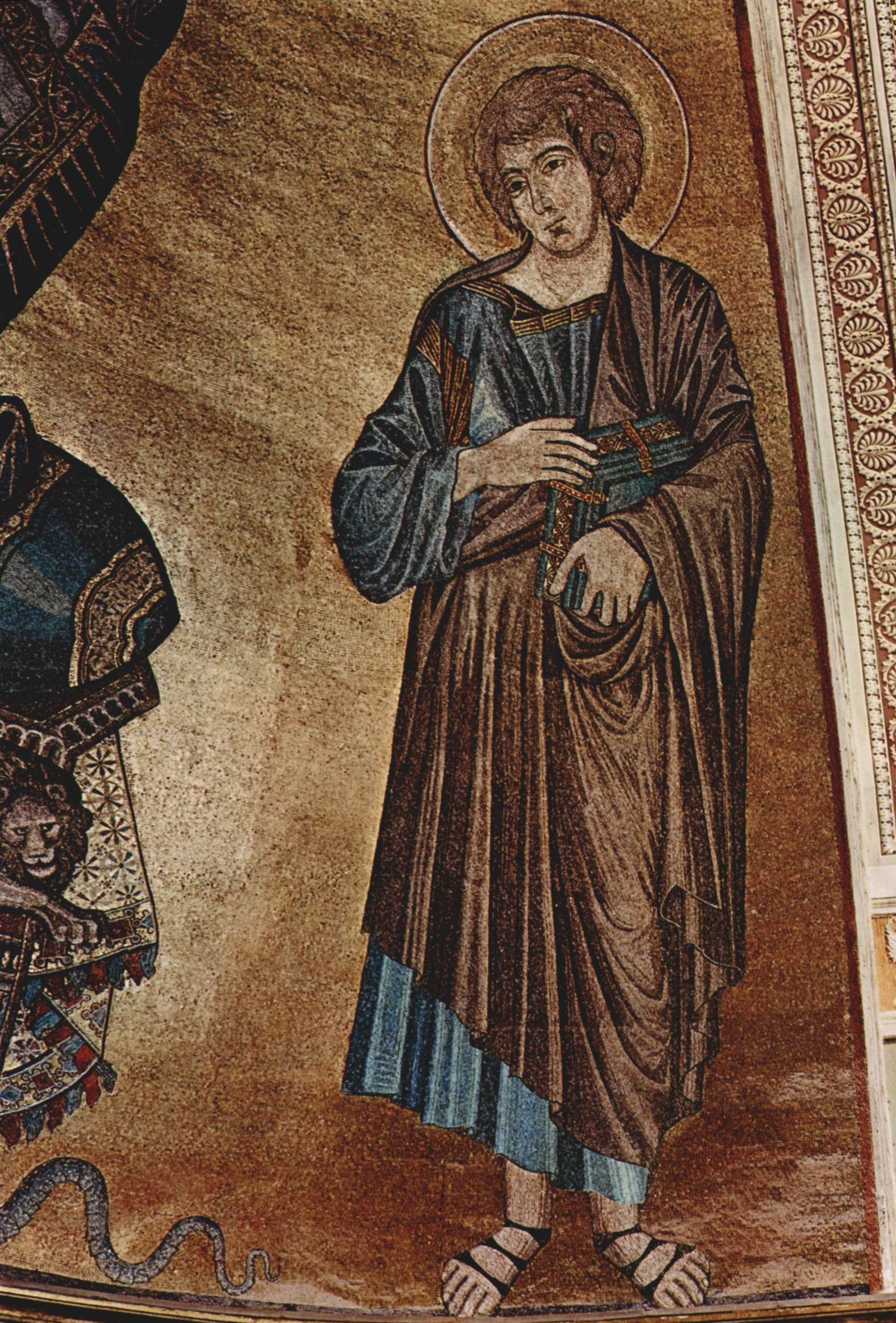
Mosaic of Saint John the Evangelist (c. 1301), Apse of Pisa Cathedral. The only documented work of Cimabue.

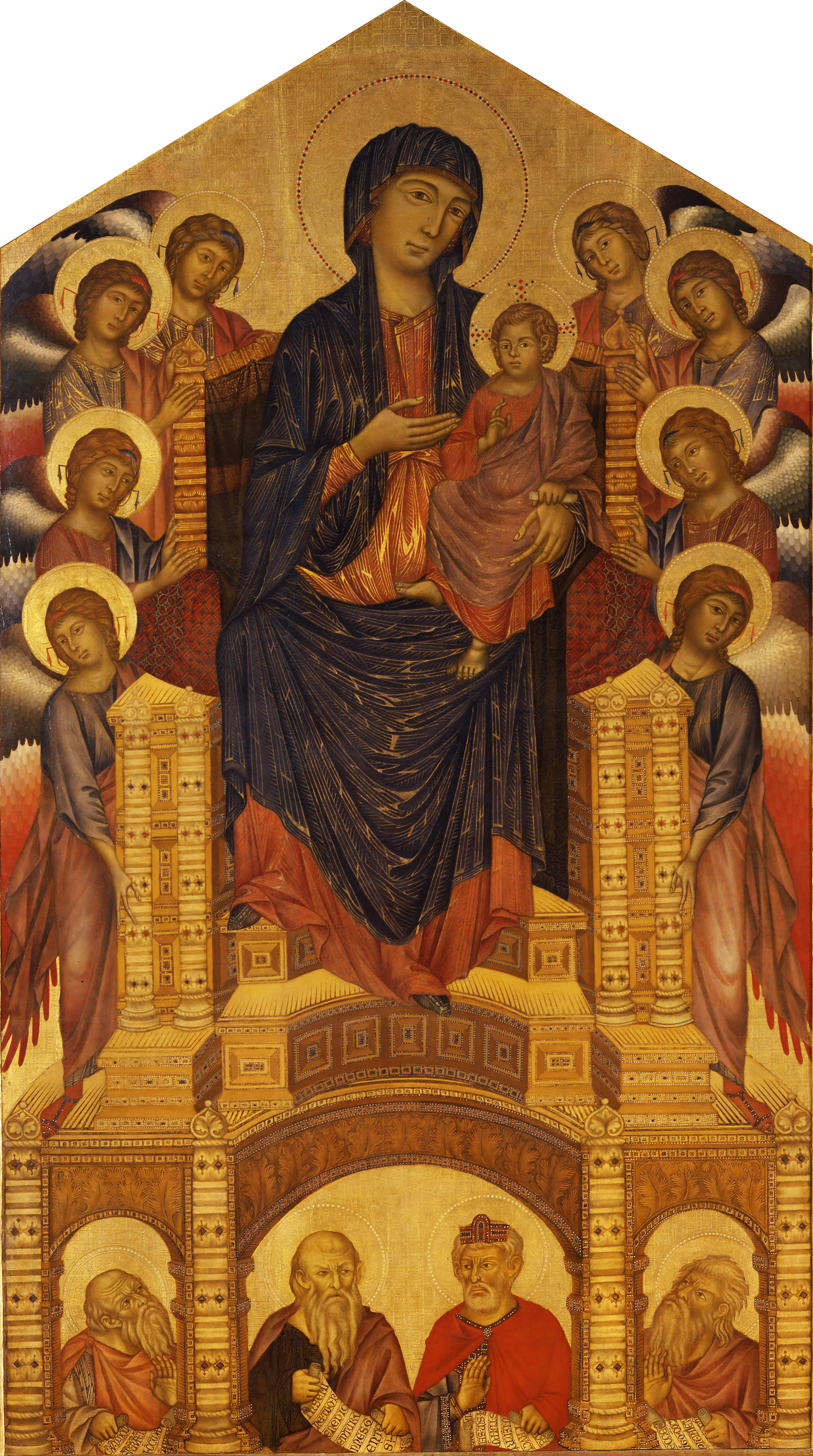
Cimabue, Santa Trinita Maestà (c. 1285, Uffizi Gallery).

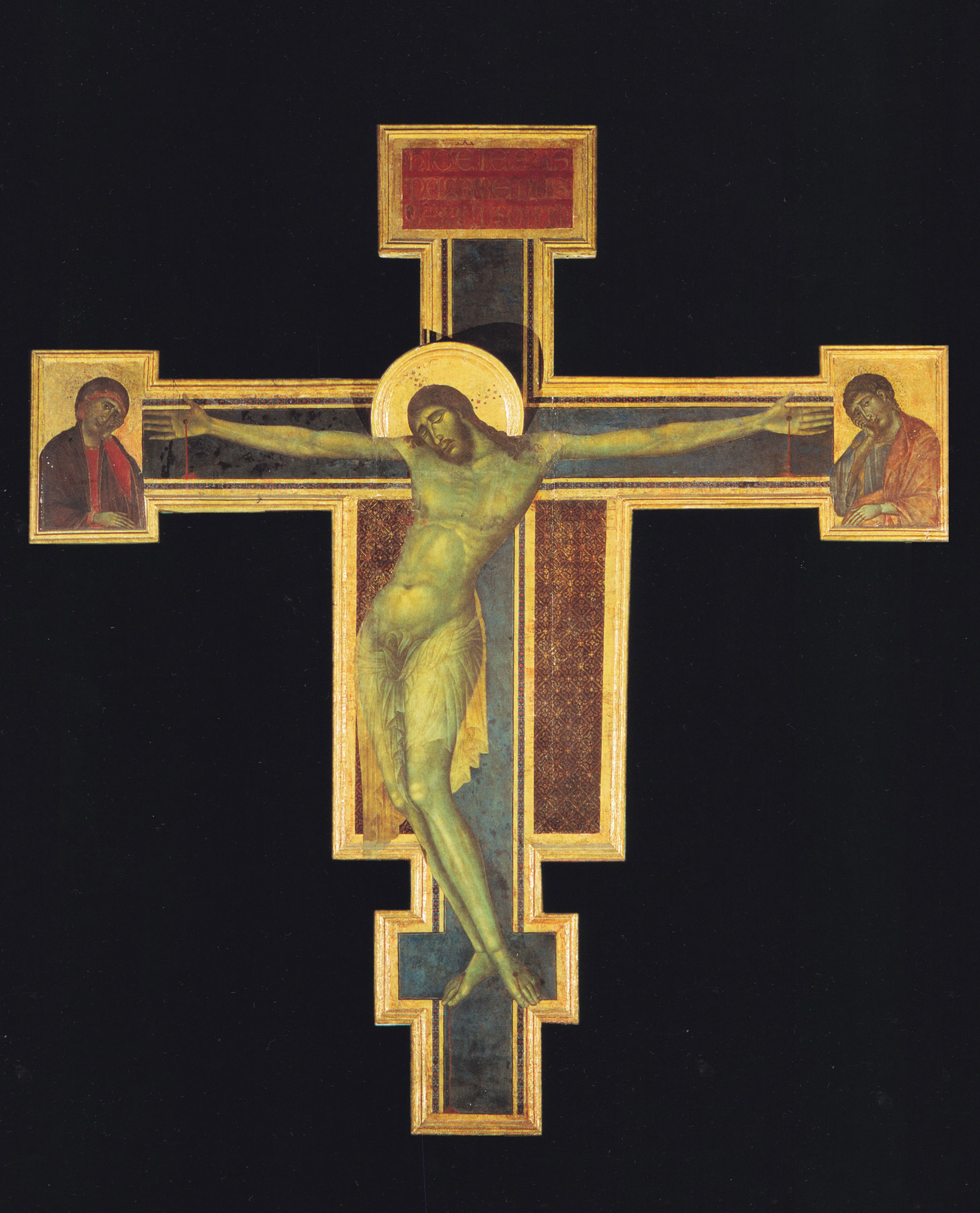
Cimabue, Crucifix (c. 1265, Museum of Santa Croce). Damaged by 1966 flood of the Arno.

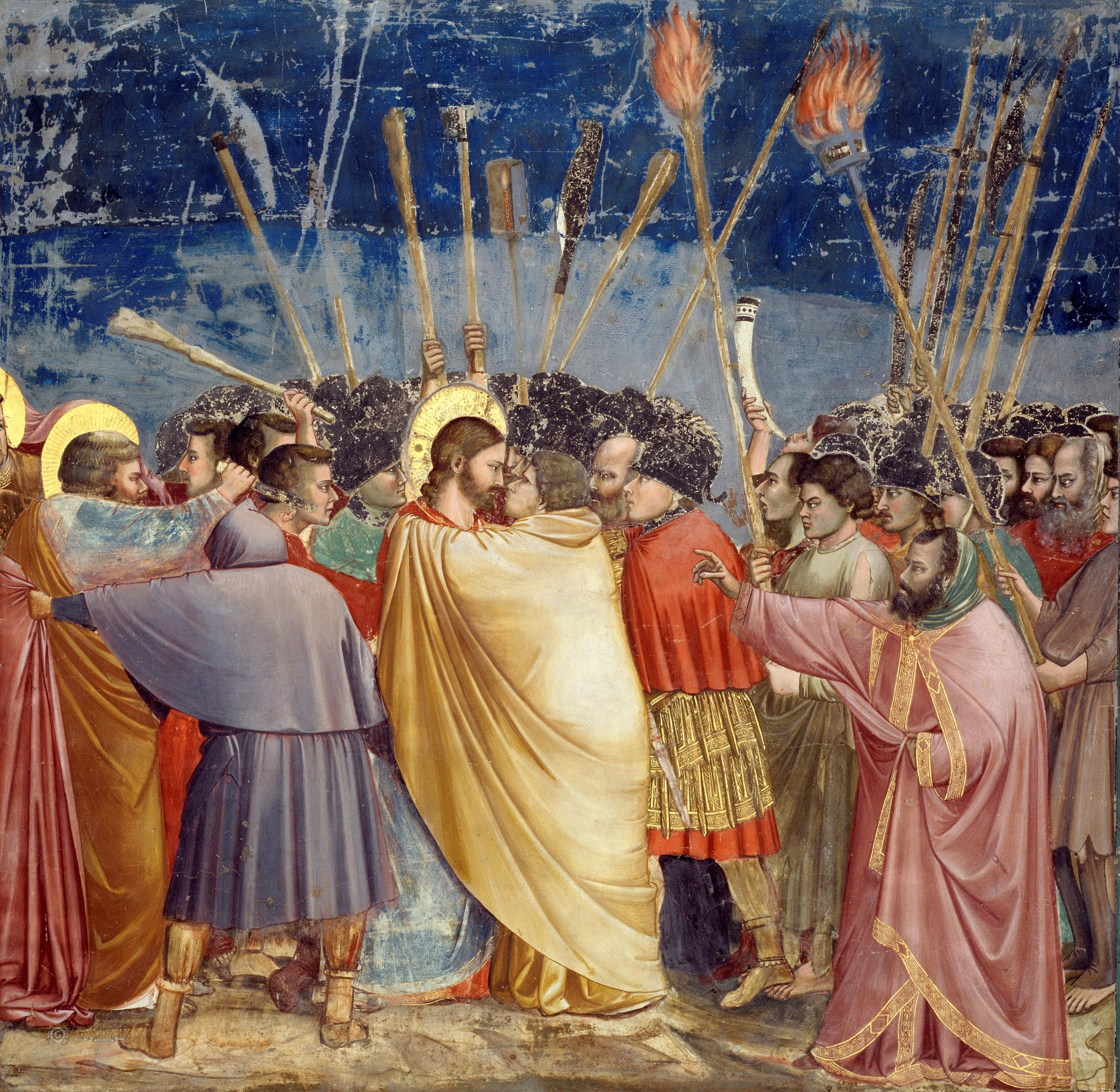
Giotto, Kiss of Judas (c. 1305) from Scrovegni Chapel (c. 1305)

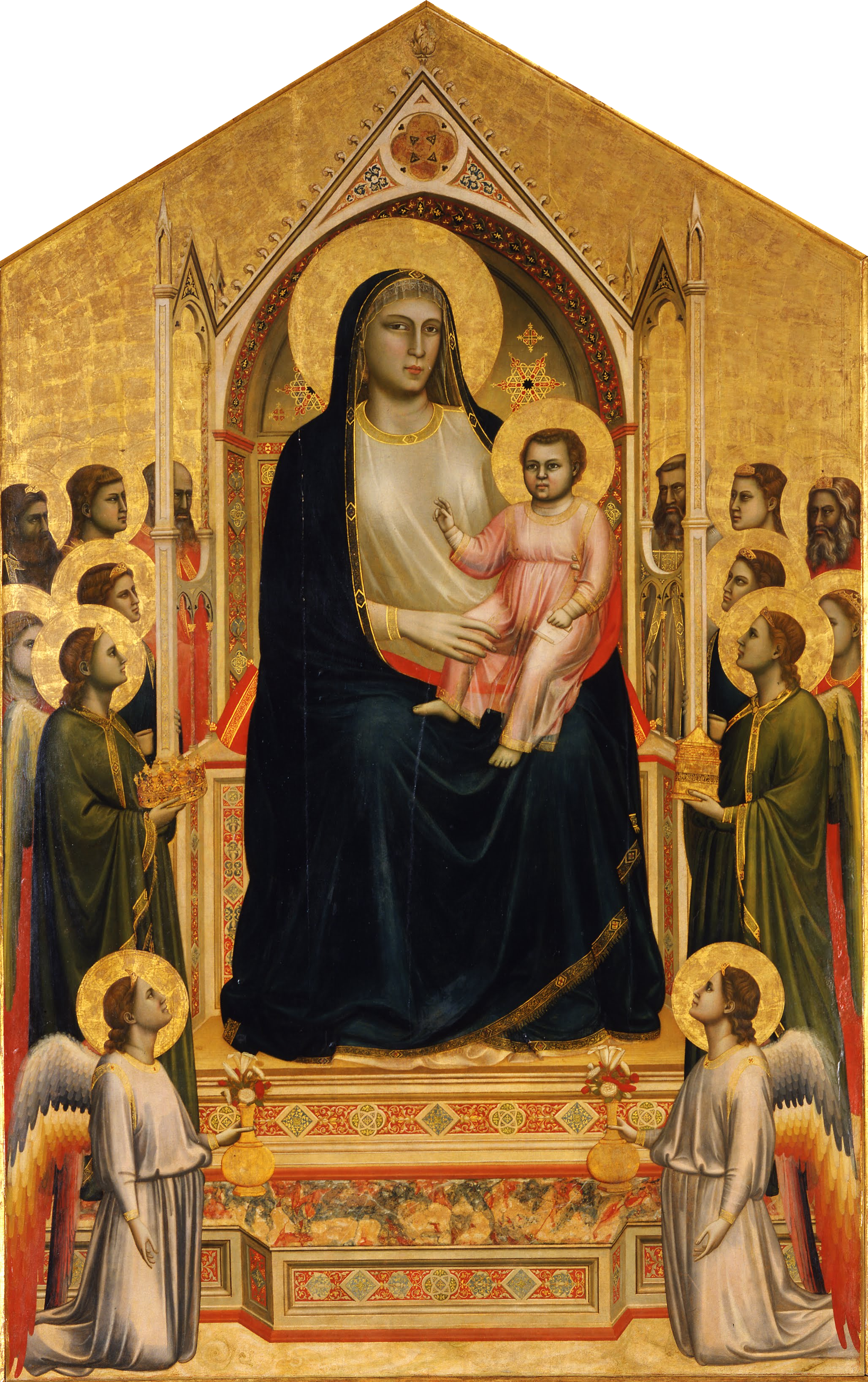
Giotto, Ognissanti Madonna, (c. 1310, Uffizi Gallery)

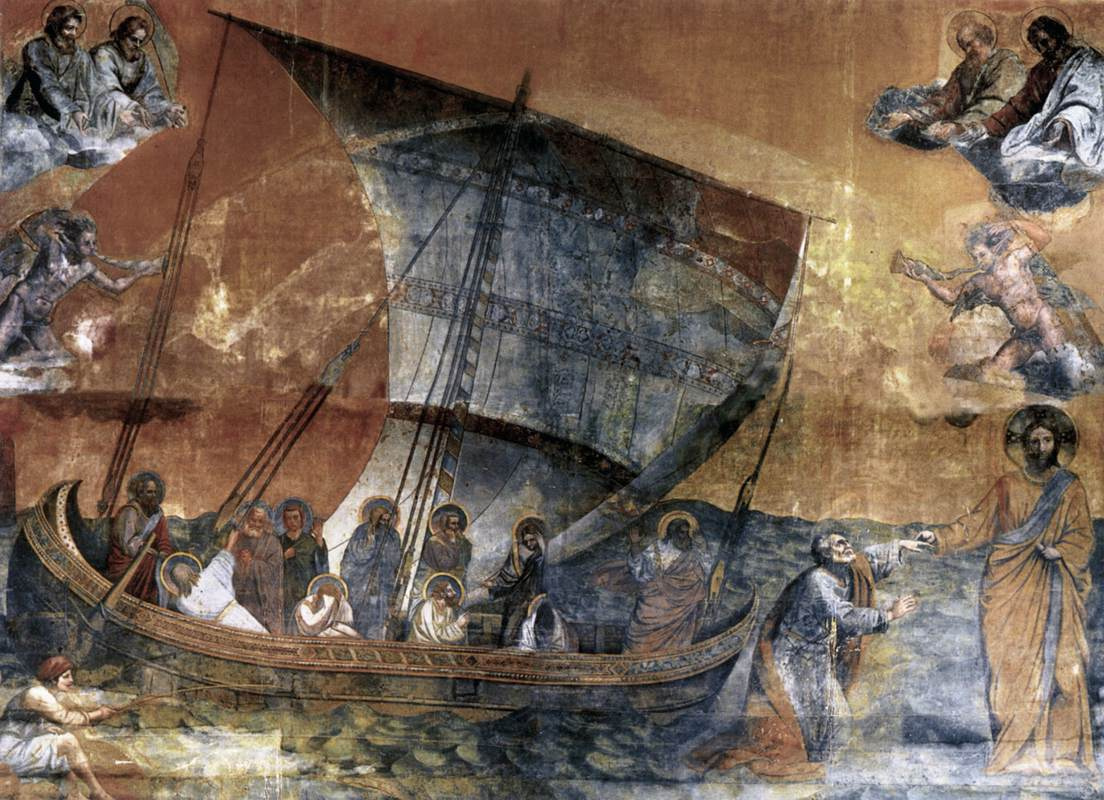
Reproduction painting (1628) of Giotto's lost Navicella mosaic (c. 1310).

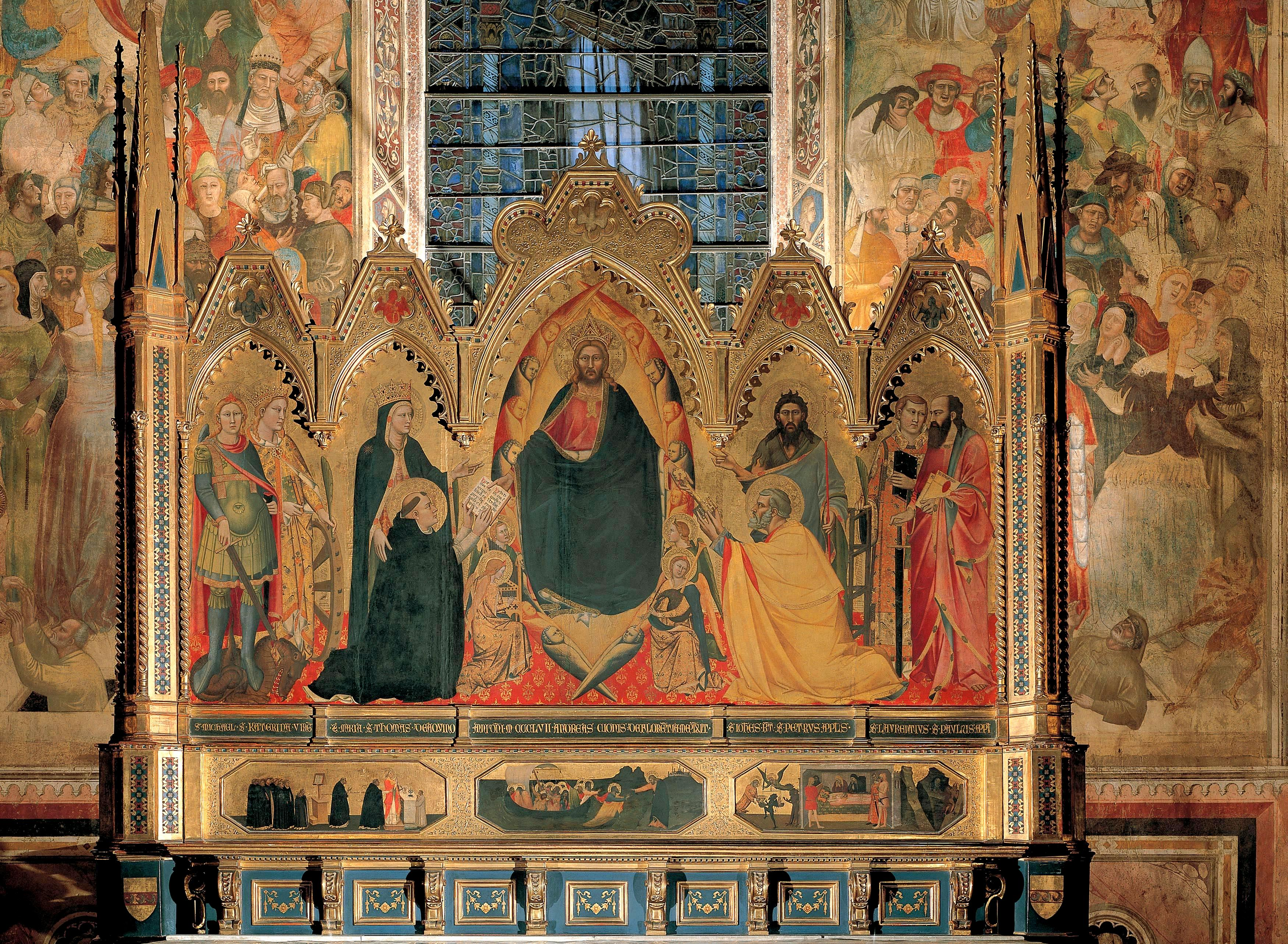
Orcagna, Strozzi Altarpiece (c. 1355) from Basilica of Santa Maria Novella.

Andrea di Bonaiuto, Triumph of St. Thomas Aquinas (c. 1365) from Basilica of Santa Maria Novella.

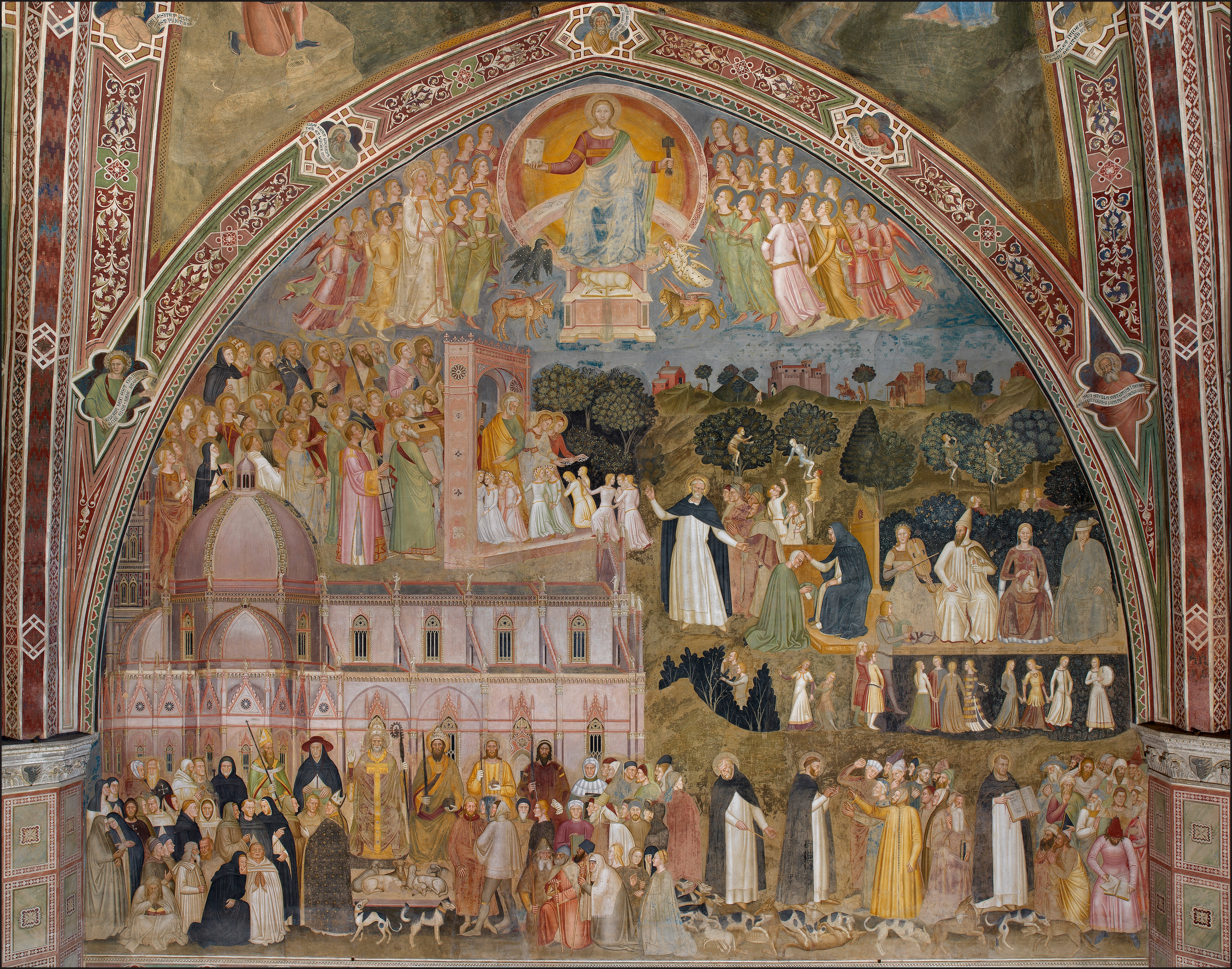
Andrea di Bonaiuto, Way of Salvation (c. 1365) from Basilica of Santa Maria Novella.

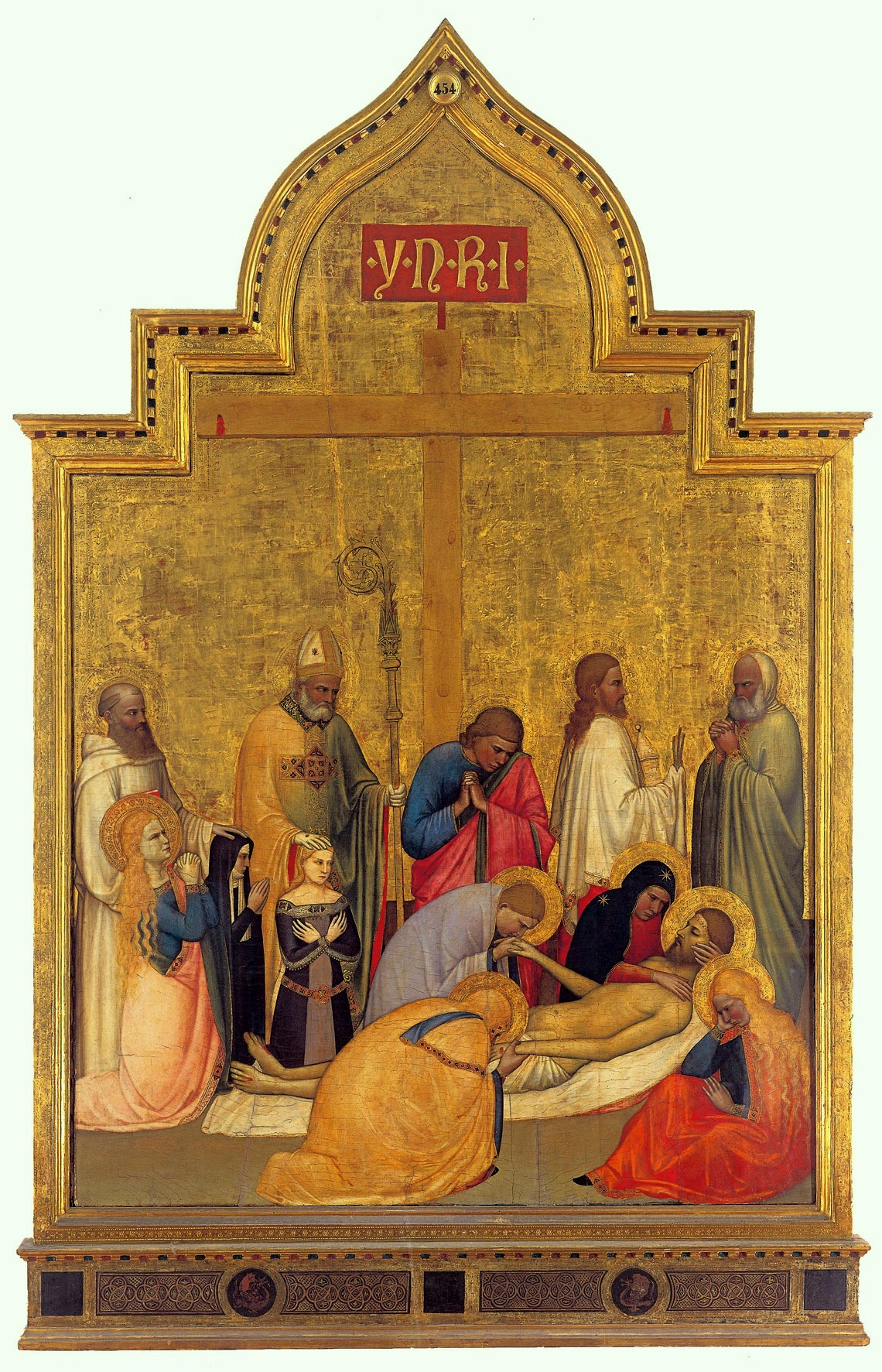
Giottino, Pietà of San Remigio (c. 1365, Uffizi Gallery).

Giotto, Lamentation (c. 1305) from Scrovegni Chapel.

Italian Medieval and Gothic painting became more realistic with the two greatest medieval masters of naturalistic Western painting: Byzantine-influenced Florentine Cimabue (c. 1240–1302) and his pupil Giotto (c. 1267–1337), who improved his master's style, most notably at Scrovegni Chapel. Ever since, paintings became much more free and innovative, depicting three-dimensional volume and perspective. According to Lives of the Artists (1550) by Giorgio Vasari (1511–1574), Giotto surreptitiously "painted a fly on the nose of a figure on which Cimabue himself was employed", and when Cimabue returned, "he believed it to be real". (Note: Giotto is mentioned in Dante Alighieri's (c. 1265–1321) Divine Comedy (c. 1321): "In painting Cimabue thought he should hold the field, now Giotto has the cry, So that the other's fame is growing dim.")

According to The Lives, Florentine Andrea Pisano (1290–1348) taught Andrea Orcagna (c. 1308–1368). Giotto influenced Orcagna, and his pupil Andrea di Boniauto (1319–1377). Giotto also influenced Stefano Fiorentino (1301–1350), father of Giottino (fl. 1324–1369); and Taddeo Gaddi, father of Cennino Cennini (c. 1360–1427). The Uffizi Gallery houses much Florentine painting.

==== International Gothic ====
Image Gallery (Click "Show" to view)
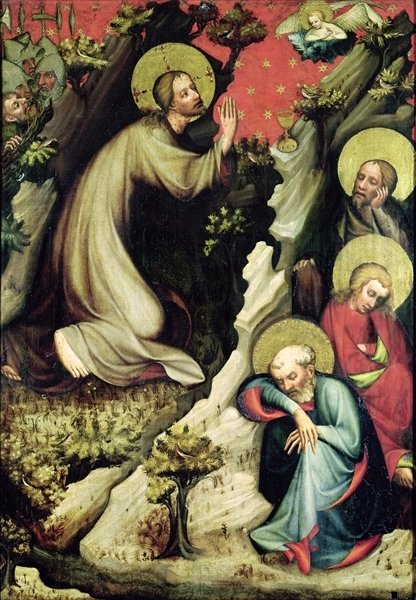
The Master of the Třeboň Altarpiece, The Agony in the Garden of Gethsemane, Třeboň Altarpiece central panel (c. 1390, National Gallery Prague).

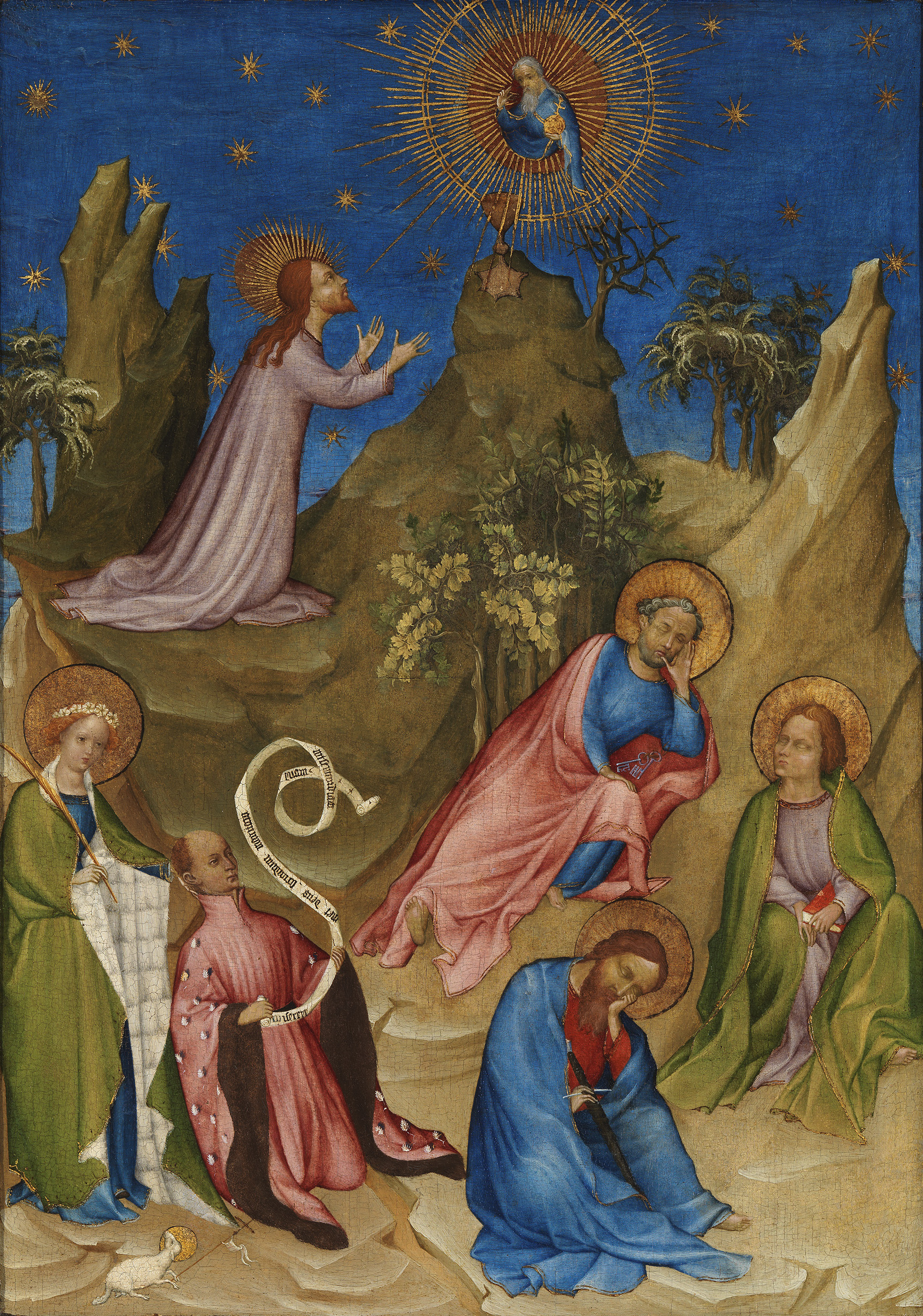
Colart de Laon, The Agony in the Garden with the Donor Louis I, Duke of Orléans (c. 1405-1408, Prado Museum).

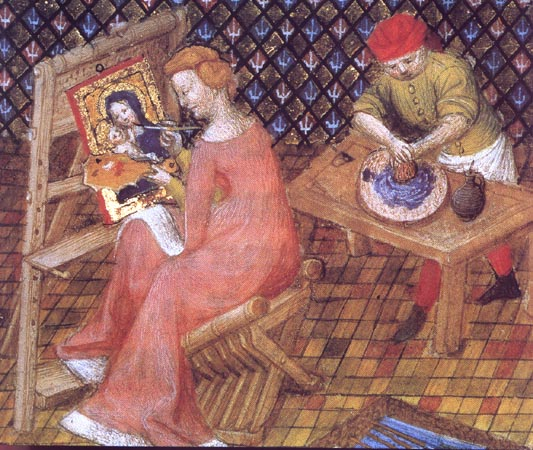
The Master of the Coronation of the Virgin, from De Mulieribus Claris (c. 1400, BnF), Timarete painting while an assistant grinds pigment.

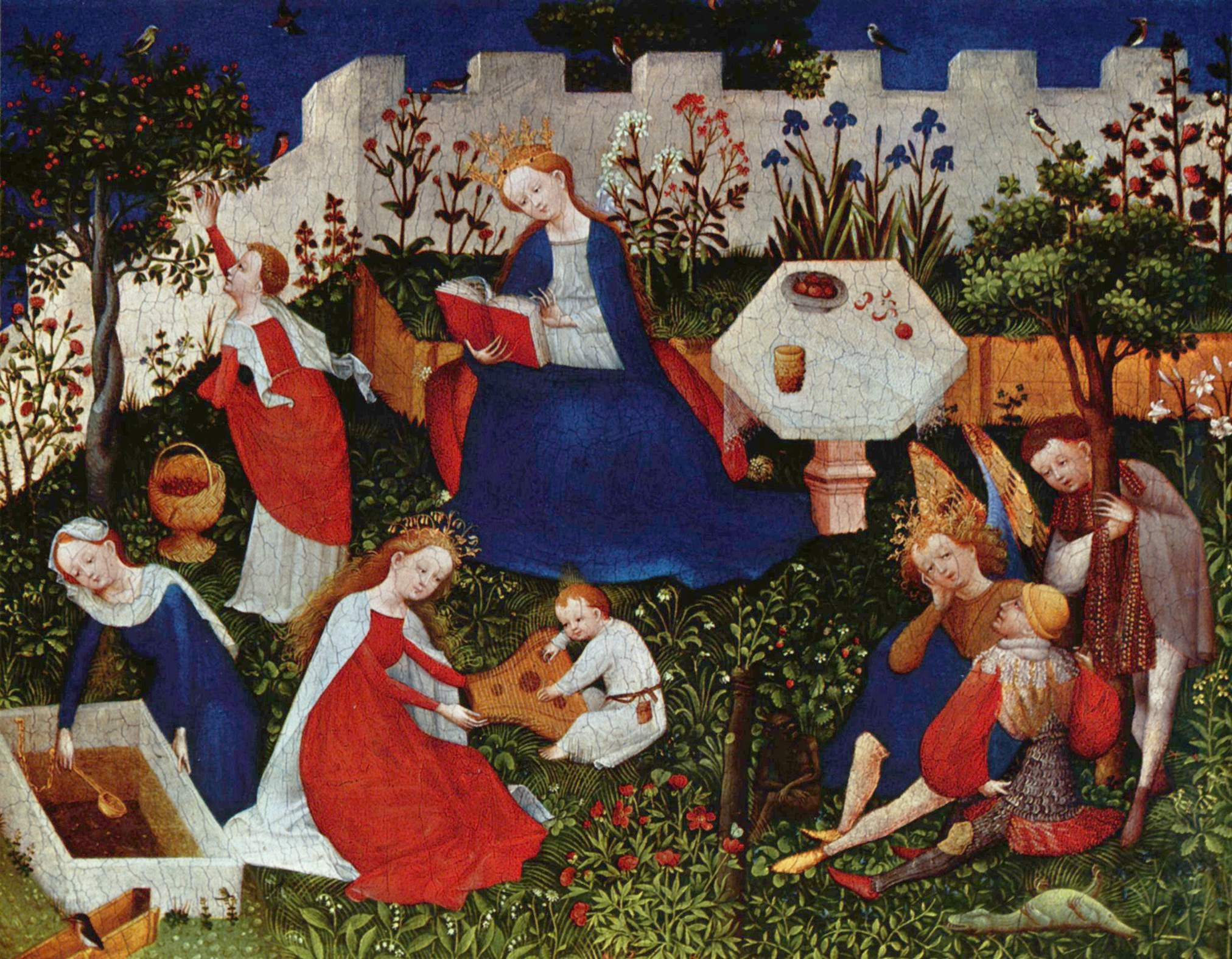
The Upper Rhenish Master, The Little Garden of Paradise (c. 1410, Städel)

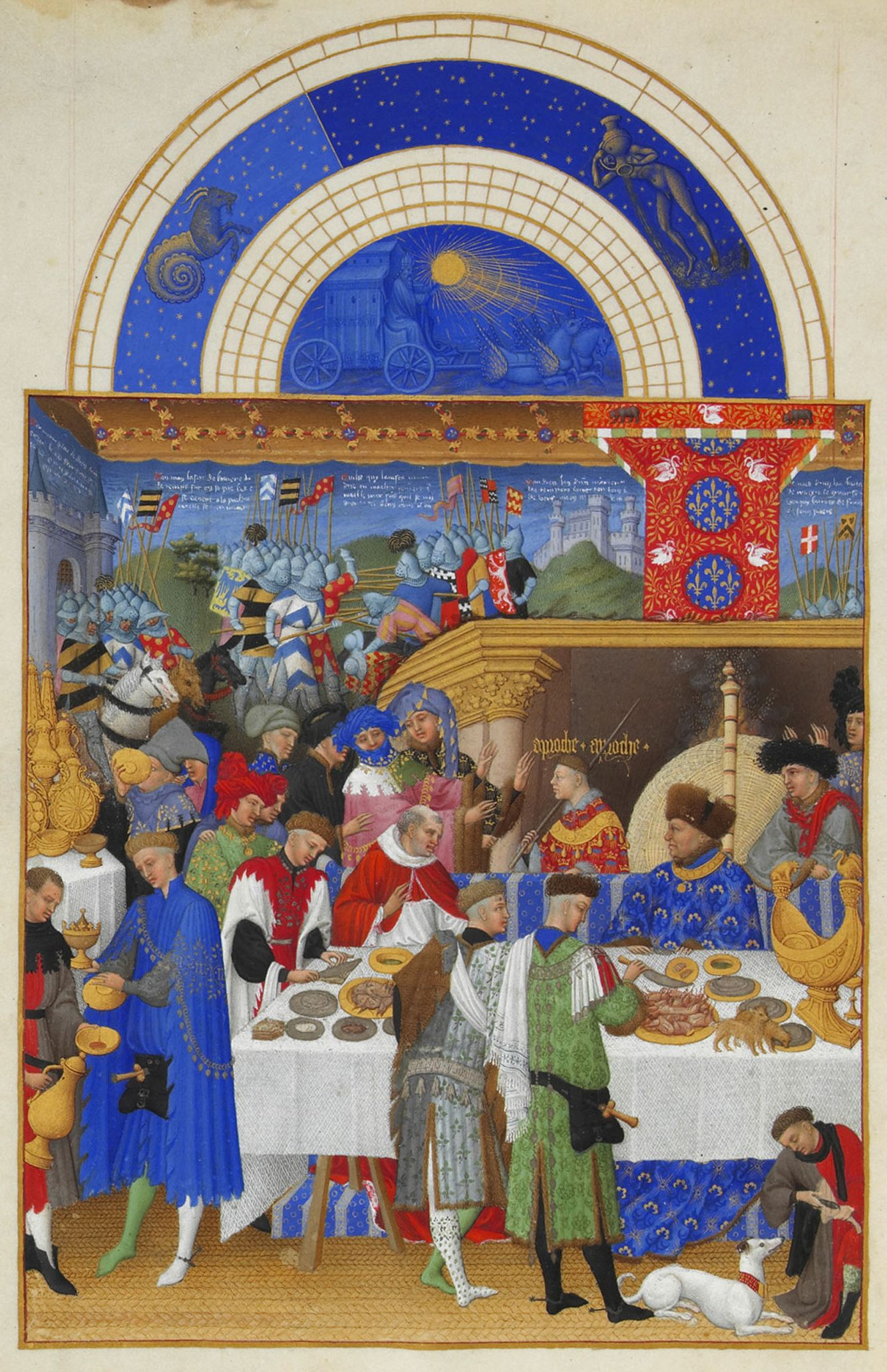
Limbourg Brothers, January from Très Riches Heures du Duc de Berry (c. 1415, Musée Condé)

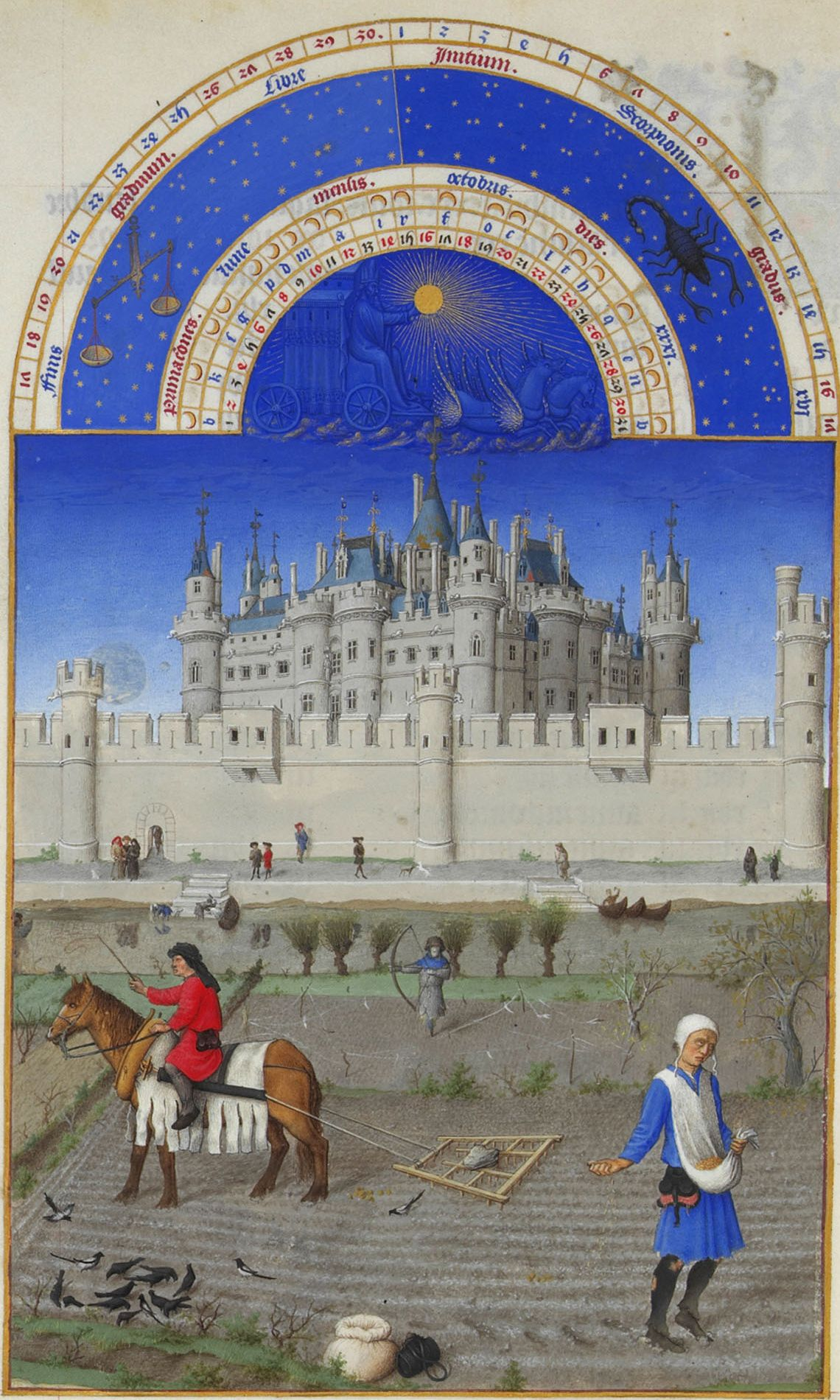
Limbourg Brothers, October from Très Riches Heures du Duc de Berry (c. 1415, Musée Condé)

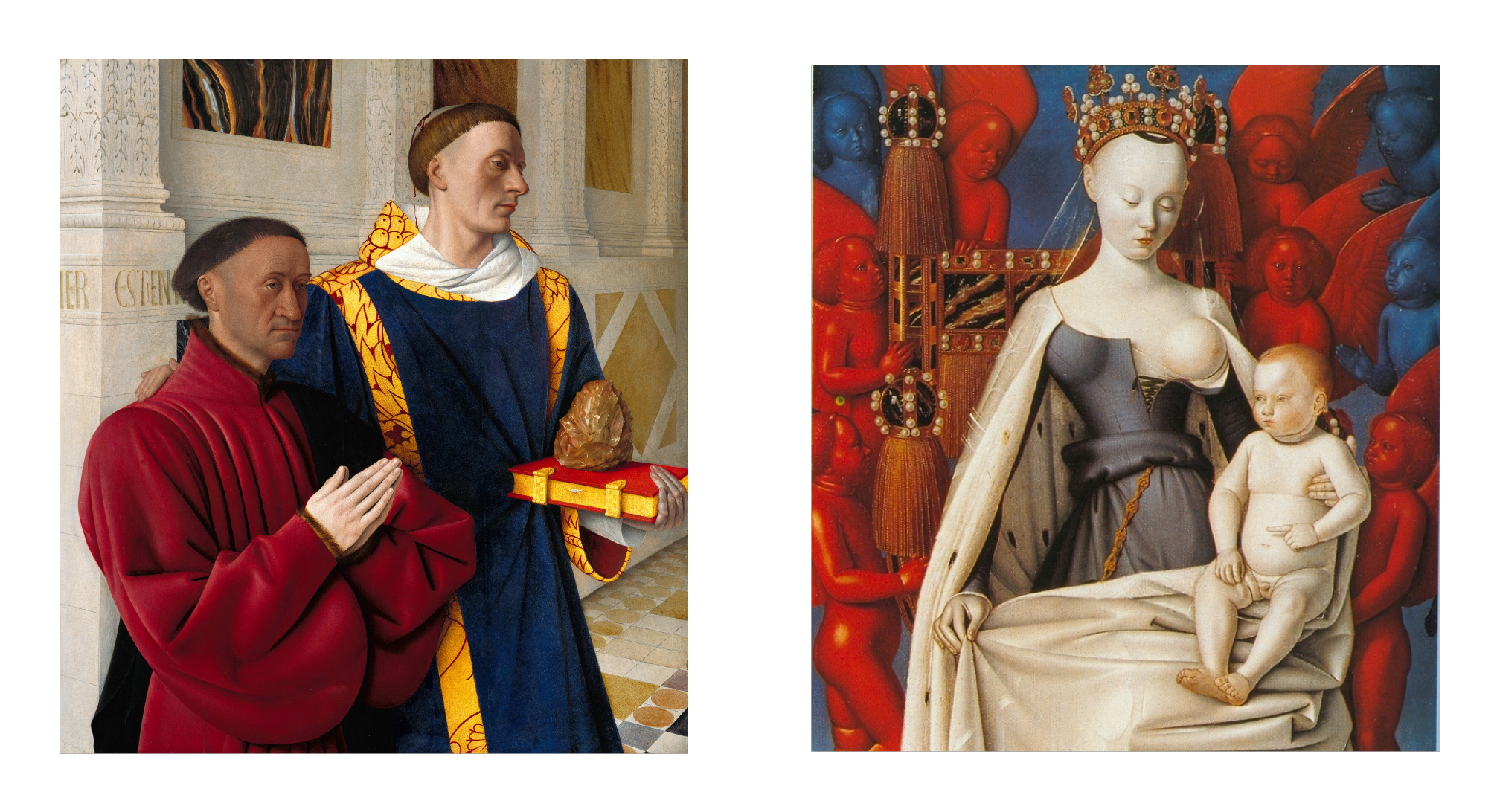
Jean Fouquet, Melun Diptych. (c. 1452, Royal Museum of Fine Arts Antwerp)

Martini influenced International Gothic, the dominant style in Italy c. 1415, which saw more tempera panel paintings and altarpieces. Parisian illuminator Jean Pucelle (c. 1300–1355) also influenced International Gothic painters, such as Colart de Laon (c. 1355–1417), court painter and valet de chambre to Louis I (1372–1407) and Charles I (1394–1465), Dukes of Orléans. Late Parisian International Gothic painters include King Louis XI's (1423–1483) court painter Jean Fouquet (c. 1420–1481) and Robinet Testard (fl. 1470–1531). Historians debate whether Fouquet trained under the Bedford Master or Jouvenal Master, and he notably traveled to Italy.

== Early modern period ==
=== Renaissance ===
Leonardo da Vinci, Mona Lisa (c. 1505, Louvre).

The Renaissance (French for 'rebirth') was a cultural movement starting in Florence, driven by the study of classical antiquity, and humanism, leading to a revolution in science (e. g. geography, astronomy), philosophy (e. g. the Reformation), and technology (e. g. printing press) influencing painting, which advanced significantly, in conjunction with the refinement of drawing, use of perspective, ambitious architecture, tapestry, stained glass, and sculpture. (Note: Historian Jacob Burckhardt (1818–1897) never finished his work on Renaissance art.)

Renaissance painters (c. 1345–1600) continued to work for the church and a wealthy aristocracy. However, while Christian imagery was still popular, painters increasingly returned to the humanist and secular, or pagan and classical; painting the world around them, or the products of their own imaginations. Those who could afford the expense became patrons and commissioned portraits of themselves or their family.

Renaissance painters developed giornata and buon fresco, contrasted with fresco-secco; and easel painting, so paintings could be hung easily, a popular alternative to paintings fixed to walls or other structures.

==== Early Renaissance ====
Image Gallery (Click "Show" to view)
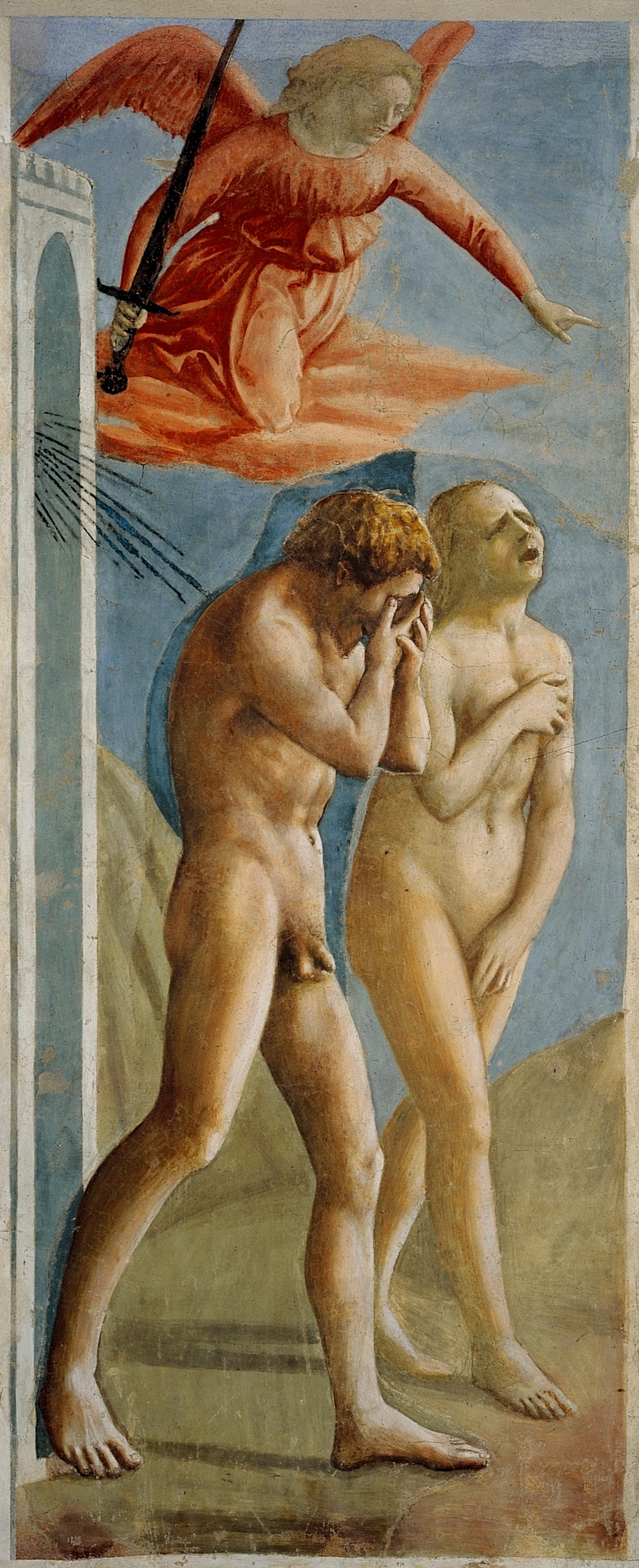
Masaccio, Expulsion from the Garden of Eden (c. 1425) from Santa Maria del Carmine.

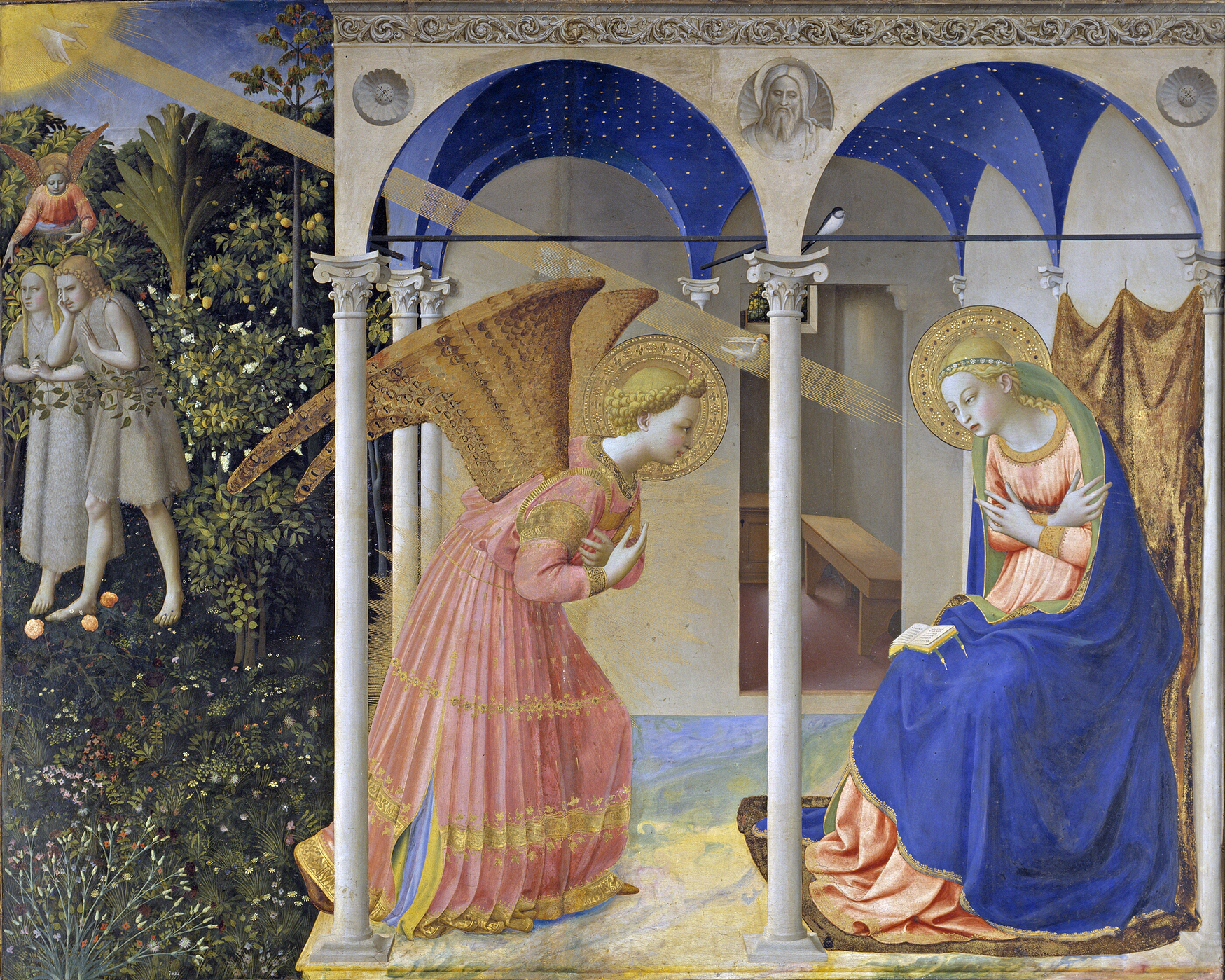
Fra Angelico, The Annunciation (c. 1425, Museo del Prado).

Paolo Uccello, Saint George and the Dragon (c. 1470, National Gallery).

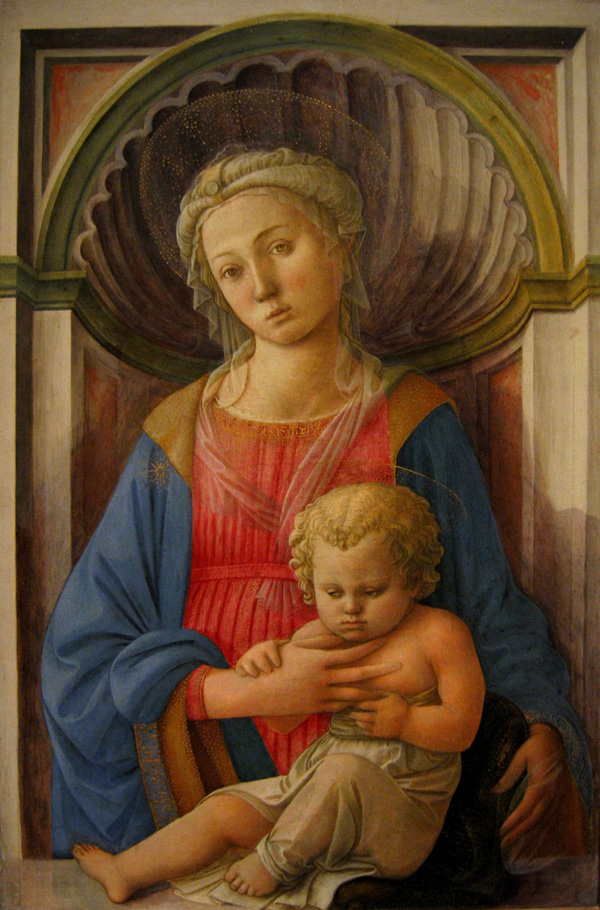
Filippo Lippi, Madonna and Child (c. 1440, National Gallery of Art).

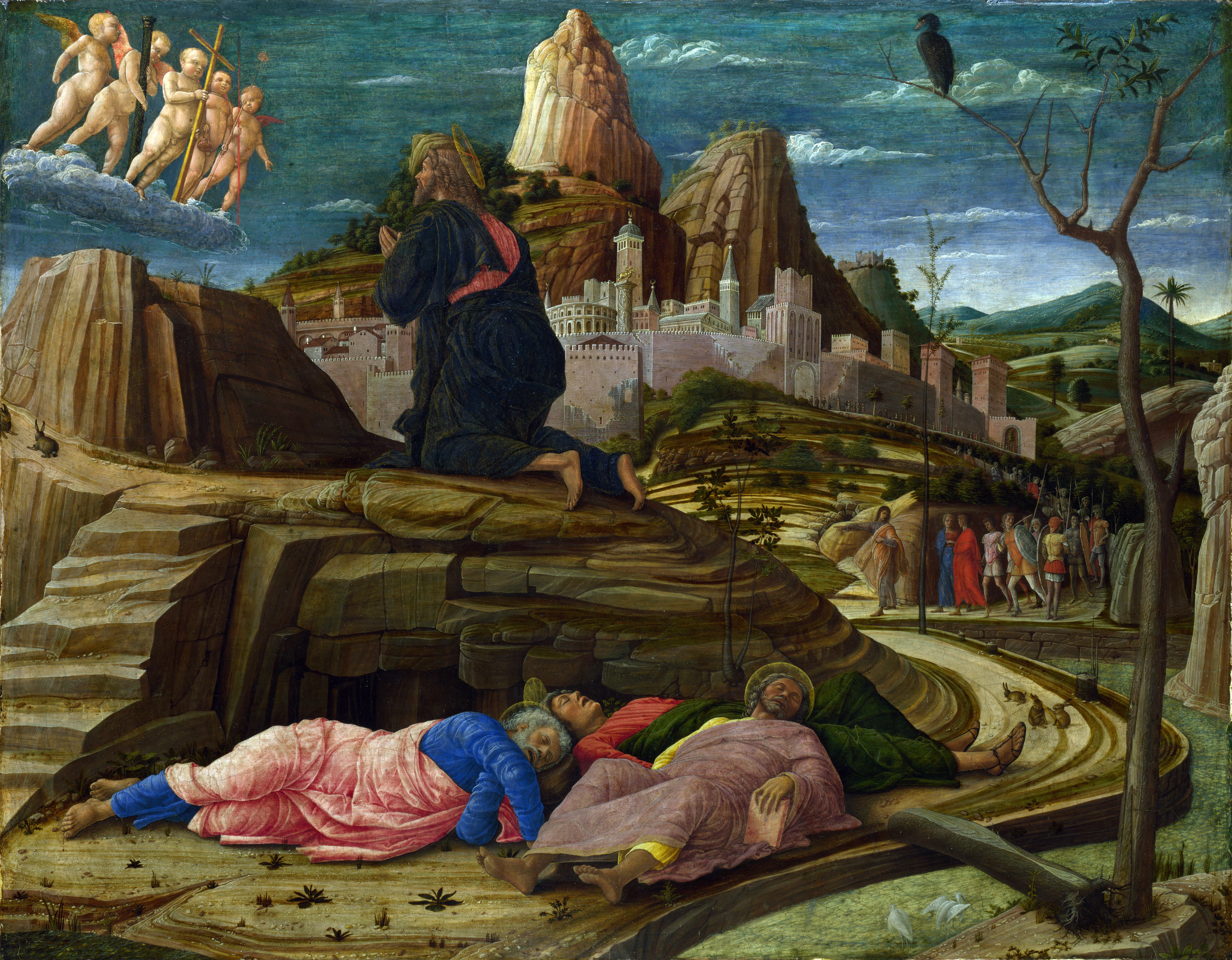
Andrea Mantegna, The Agony in the Garden of Gethsemane (c. 1455, National Gallery).

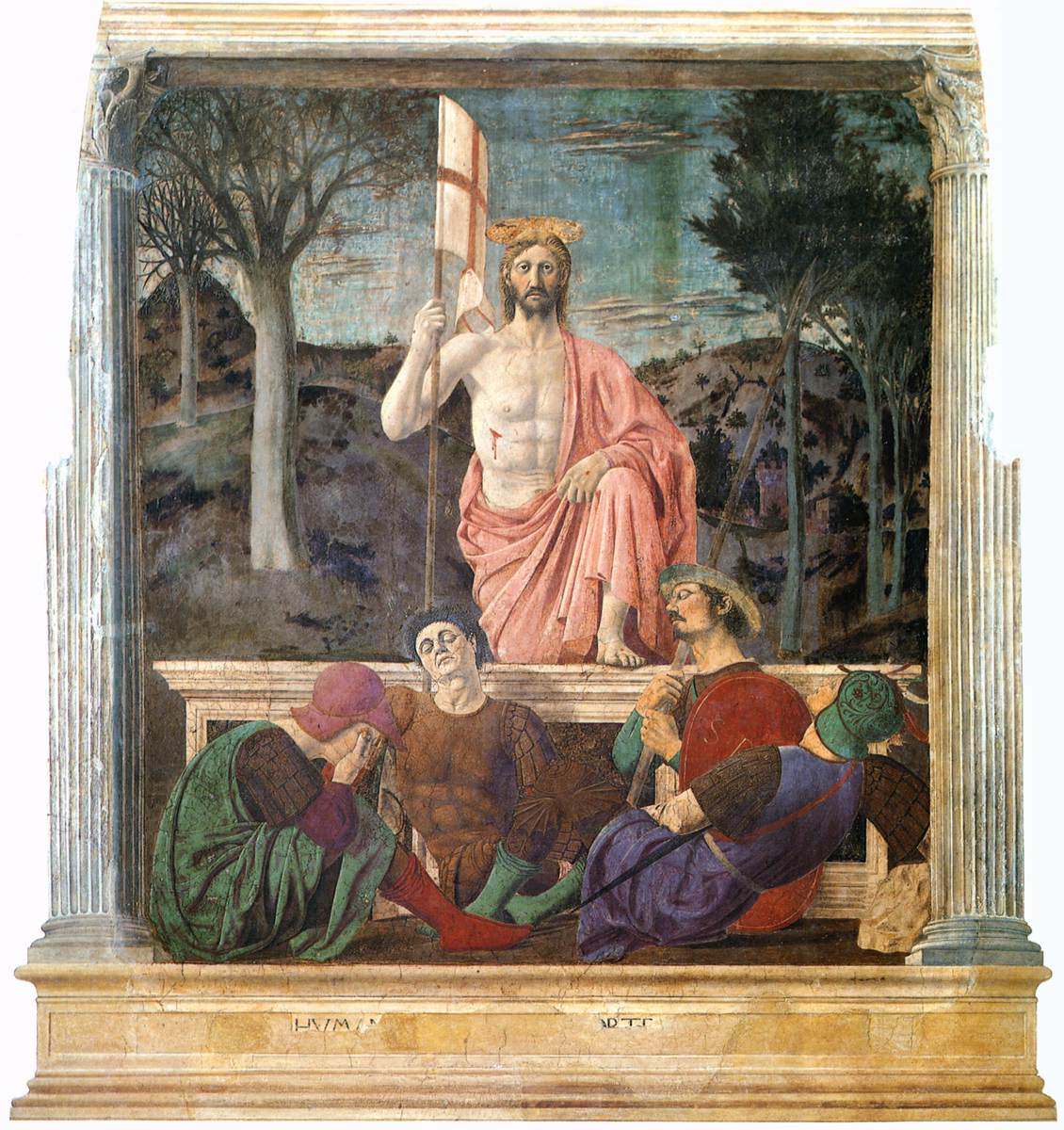
Piero della Francesca, The Resurrection of Jesus Christ (c. 1465, Museo Civico di Sansepolcro).

Sandro Botticelli, The Birth of Venus (c. 1485, Uffizi Gallery).

Italian Renaissance painting emphasized the ideal, and narrative painting. Florentine Masaccio (1401–1428) was the first painter utilizing advances in linear perspective from On Painting (1450) author Leon Battista Alberti (1404–1472), architect Brunelleschi (1377–1446), and sculptor Donatello (c. 1386–1466).

The Early Renaissance (c. 1400–1495) includes painters such as Paolo Uccello (1397–1475), Fra Angelico (c. 1395–1455), Piero della Francesca (c. 1415–1492), Andrea Mantegna (c. 1431–1506), Filippo Lippi (c. 1406–1469), Sandro Botticelli (c. 1445–1510), and Donato Bramante (1444–1514), better known for High Renaissance architecture. Aby Warburg (1866–1929) was a scholar of Early Renaissance art.

==== High Renaissance ====
Image Gallery (Click "Show" to view)
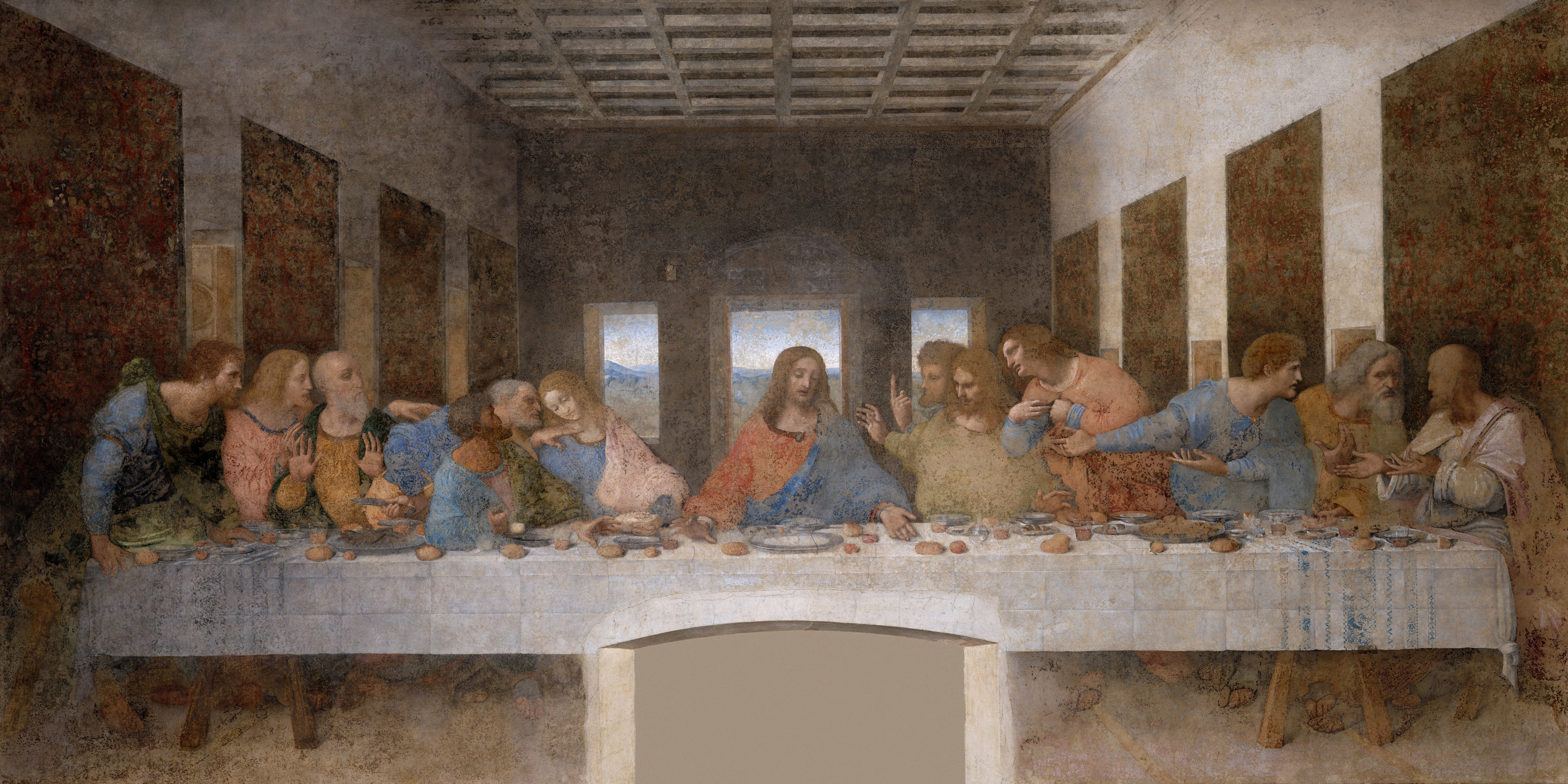
Leonardo Da Vinci, The Last Supper (c. 1495, in situ) from Santa Maria delle Grazie.

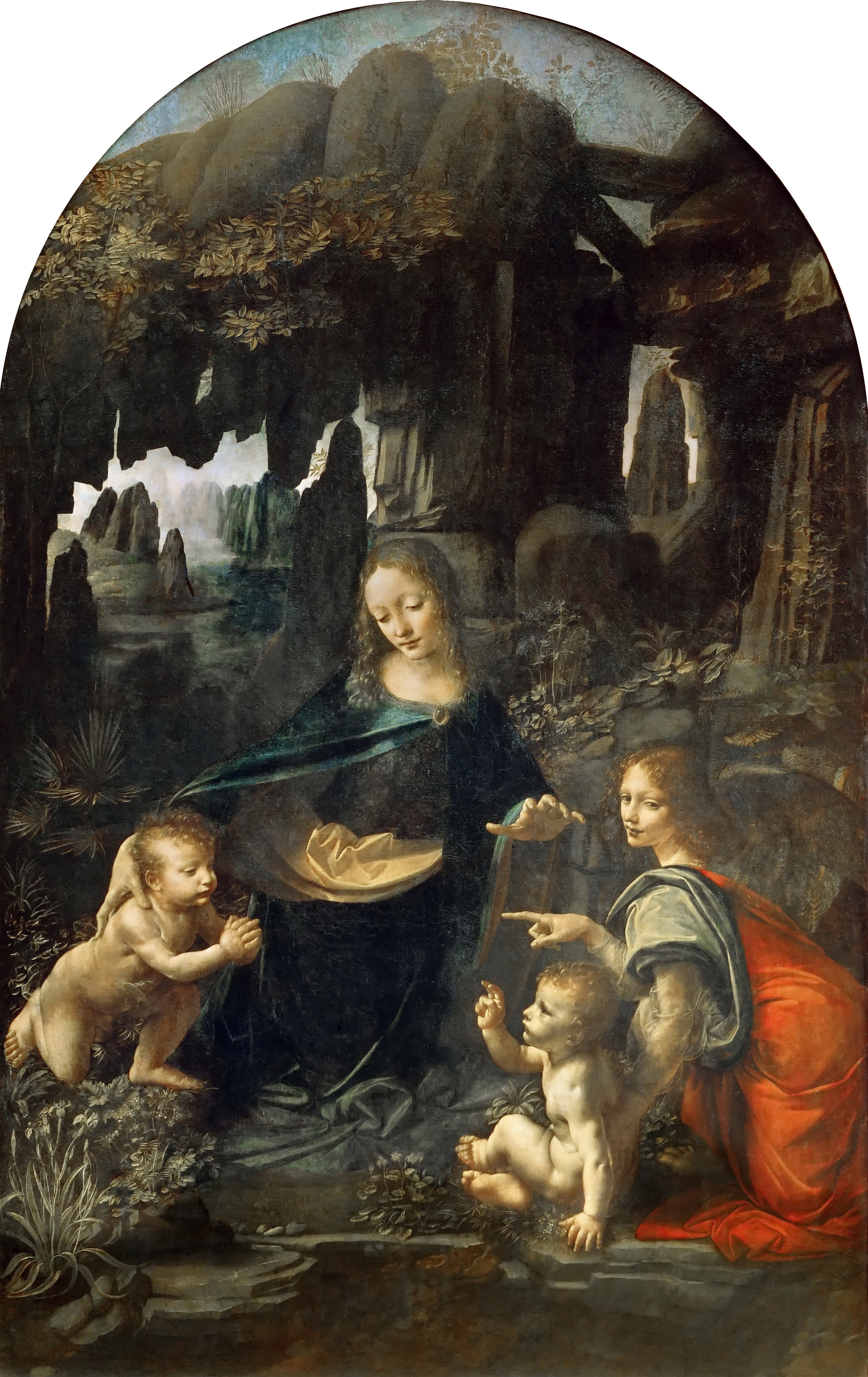
Leonardo Da Vinci, Madonna of the Rocks (c. 1485, Louvre).

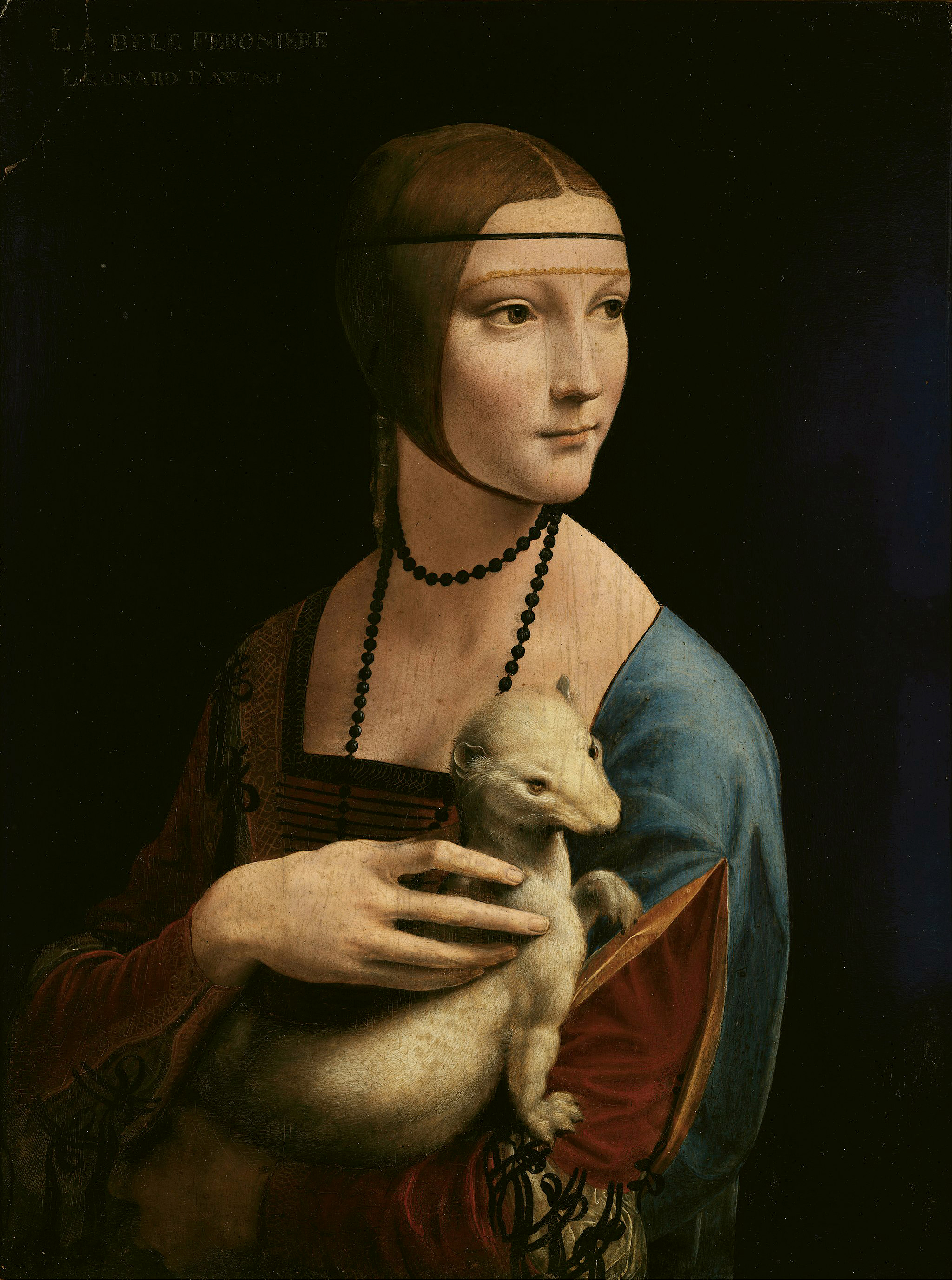
Leonardo da Vinci, Lady with an Ermine (c. 1490, National Museum in Kraków).

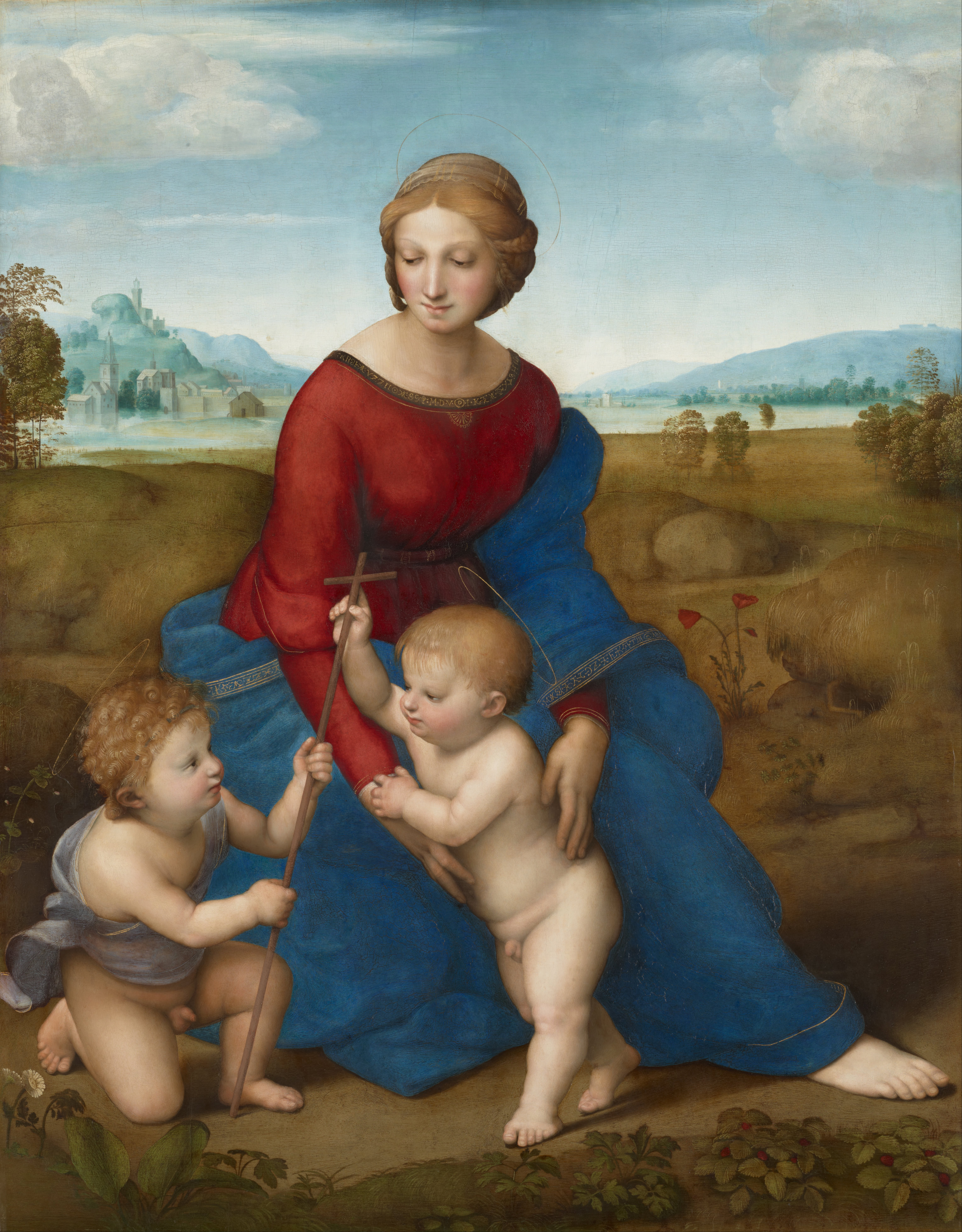
Raphael, Madonna in the Meadow (c. 1505, Kunsthistorisches Museum).

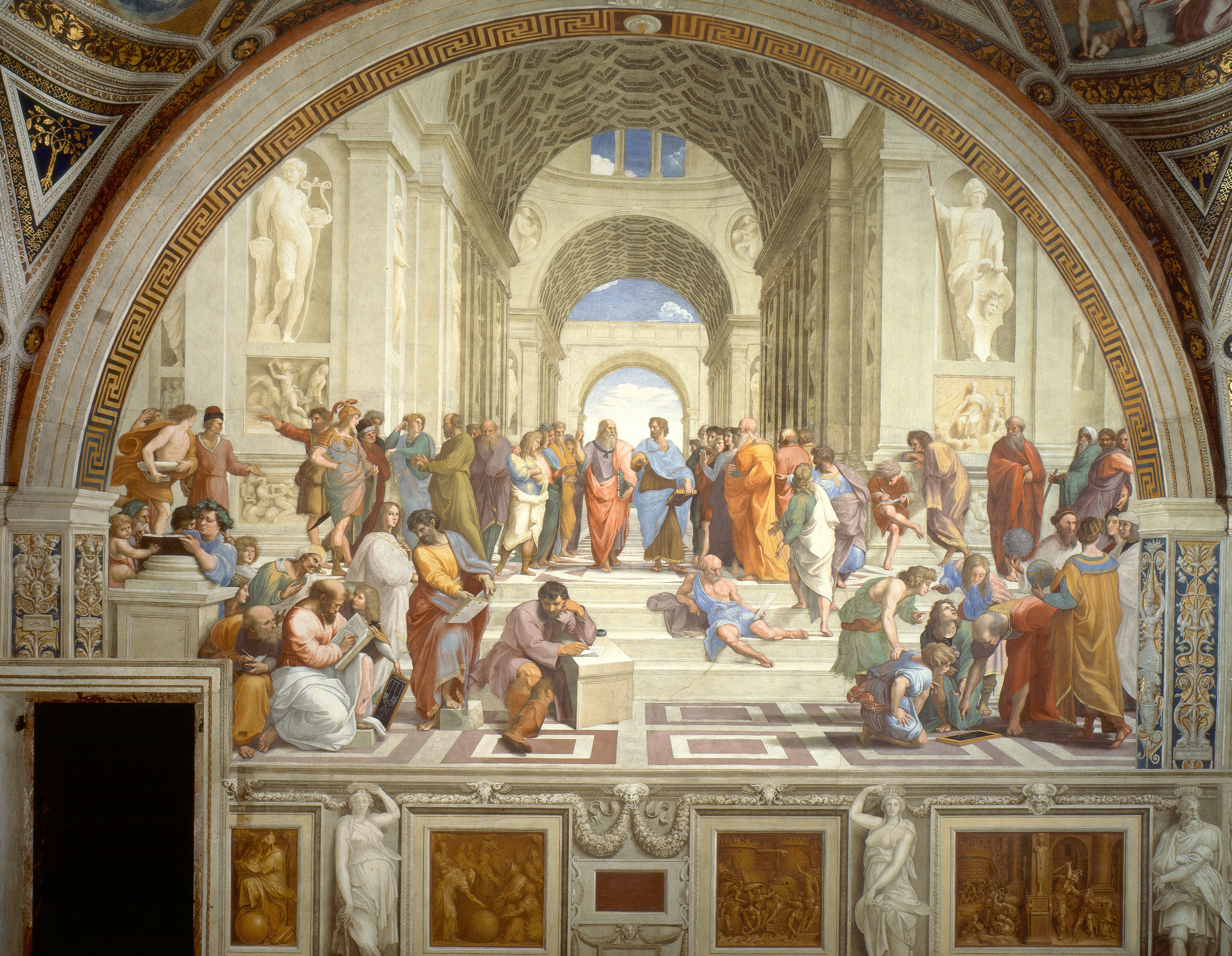
Raphael, The School of Athens (c. 1510, Vatican Museums).

Raphael, Portrait of Baldassare Castiglione (c. 1515, Louvre).

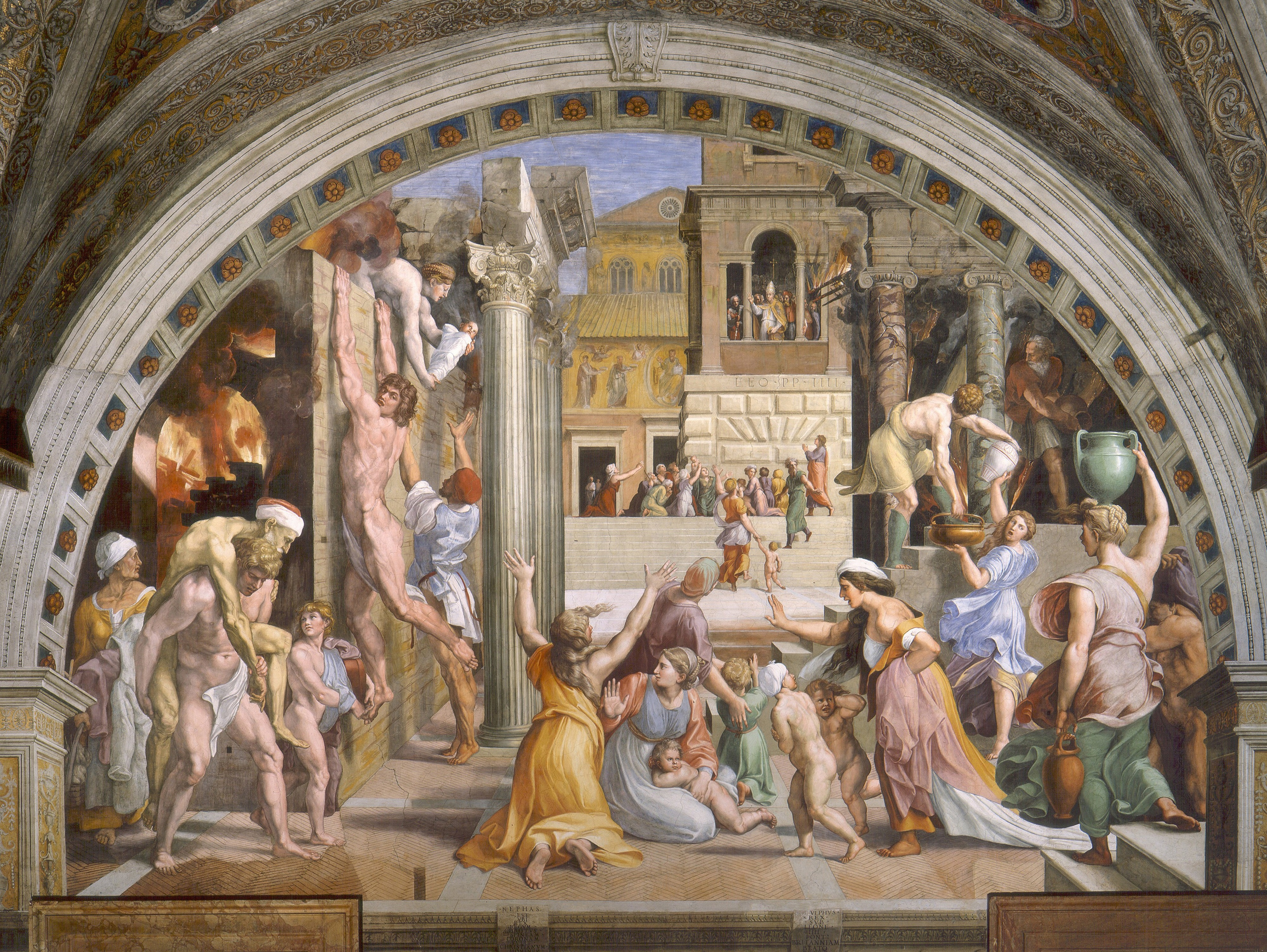
Raphael, Fire in the Borgo (c. 1517, Vatican Museums)

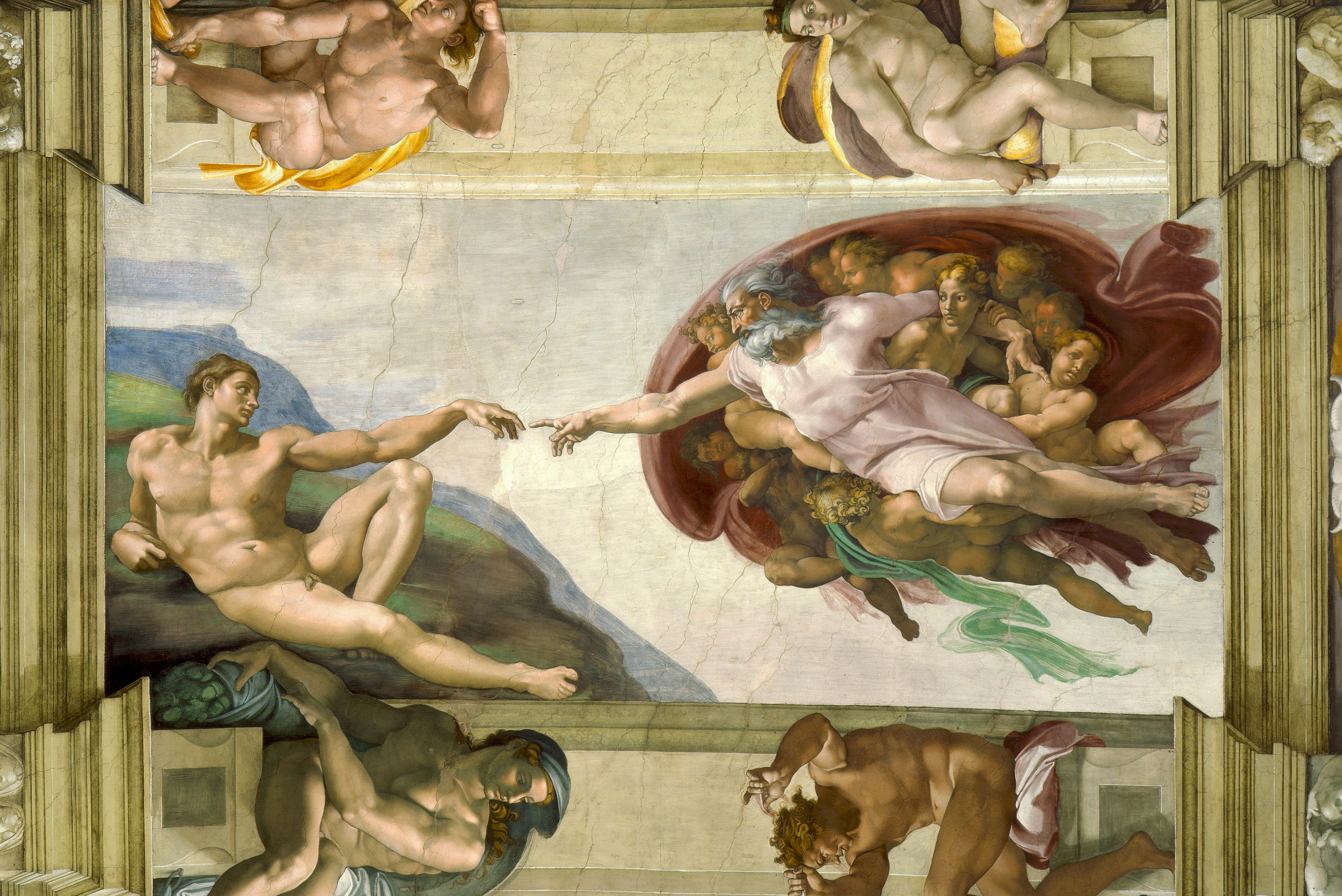
Michelangelo, Sistine Chapel ceiling (c. 1511, in situ).

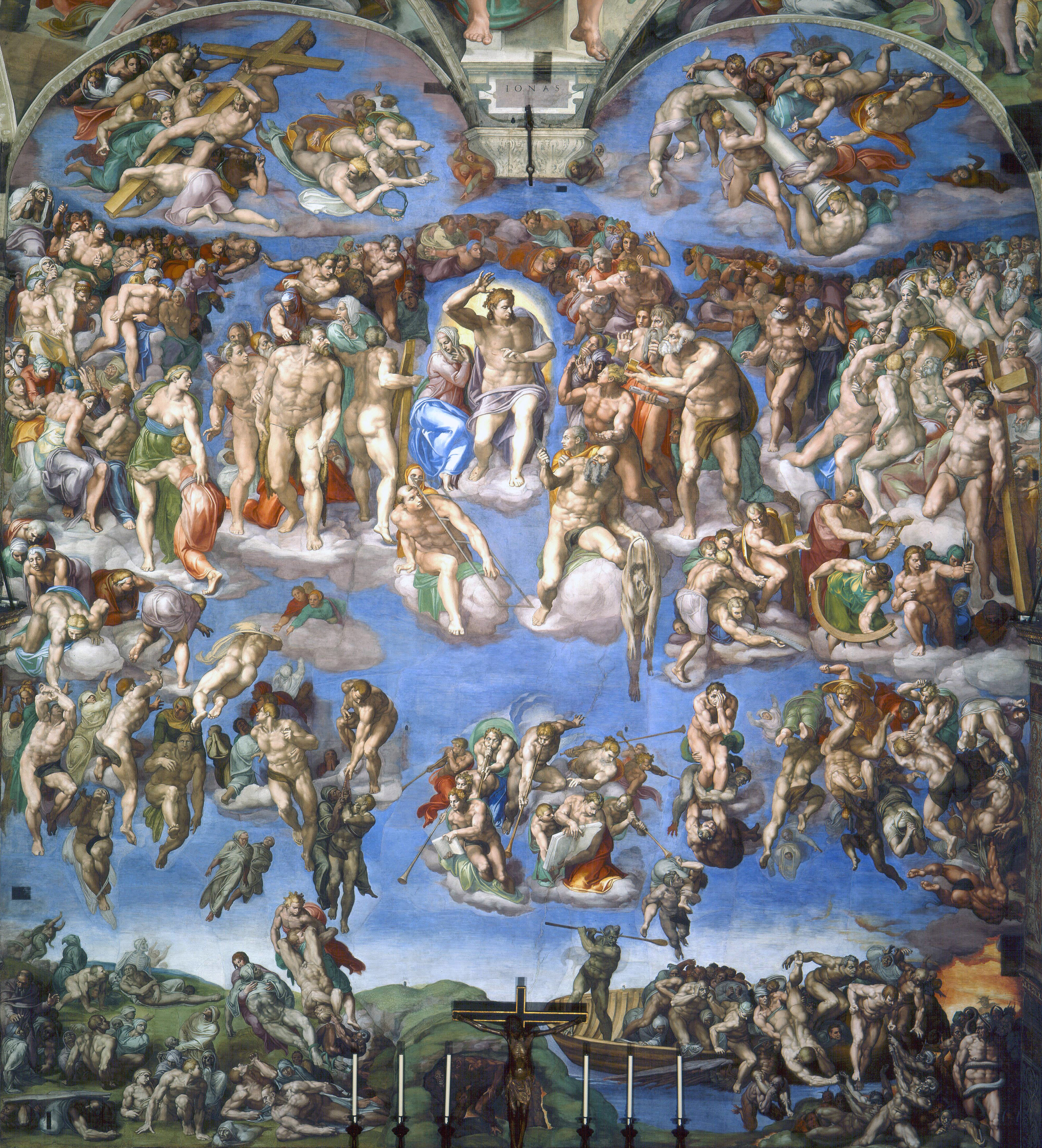
Michelangelo, The Last Judgment (c. 1540, in situ) Sistine Chapel altar wall.

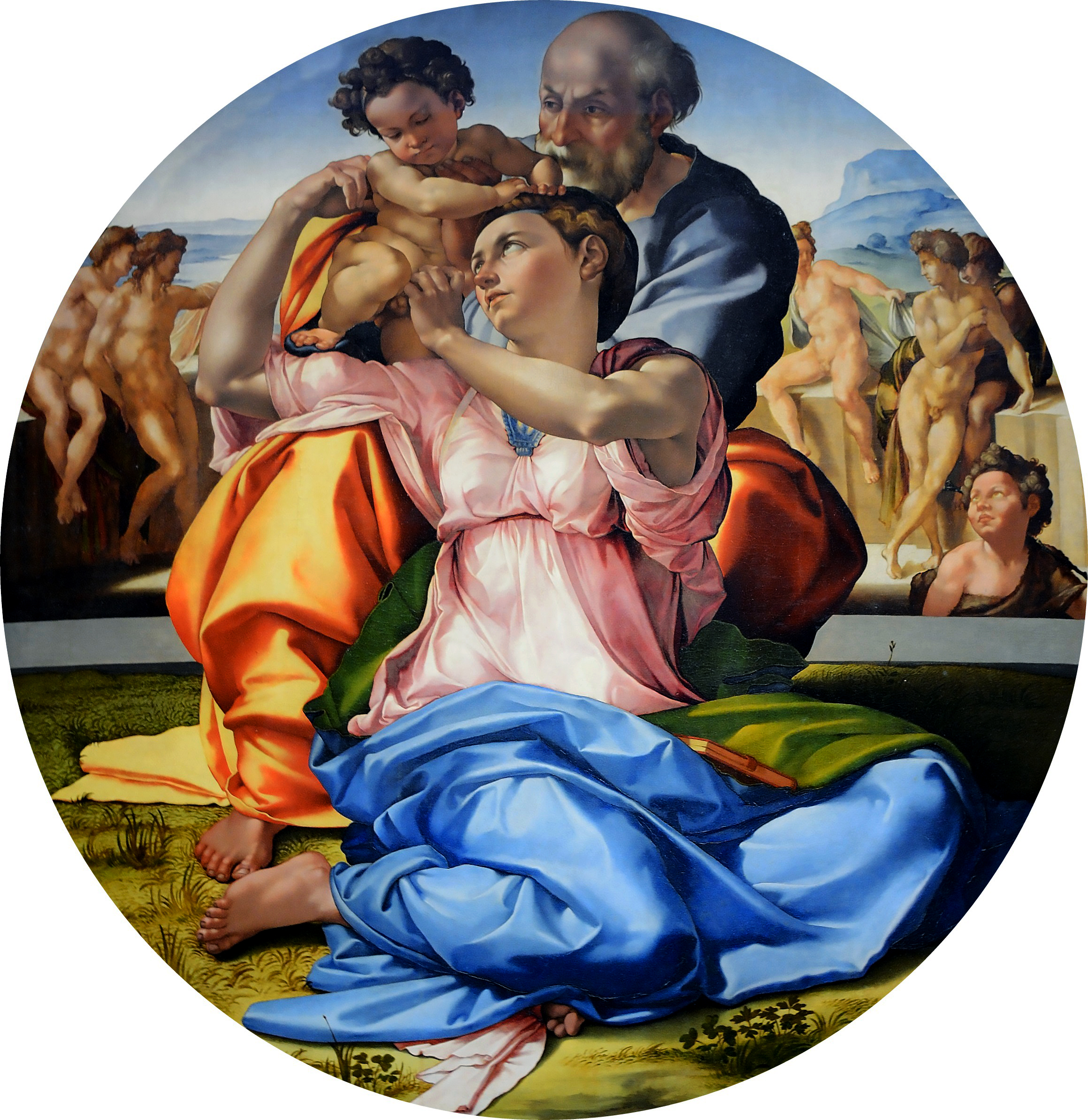
Michelangelo, Doni Tondo (c. 1507, Uffizi Gallery).

Correggio, Cherubs (c. 1519, in situ). Ceiling fresco from the San Paolo nunnery.

High Renaissance (c. 1495–1520) painters, such as Florentine sfumato pioneer and polymath Leonardo da Vinci (1452–1519), Neoplatonists Michelangelo Buonarroti (1475–1564) and Raphael (1483–1520), plus Parmesan chiaroscuro master Correggio (1489–1534), elevated their art by unprecedented refinement in techniques, perspective, and studying human anatomy and proportion. Michelangelo notably painted the Vatican's Sistine Chapel ceiling and altar wall.

===== Venetian School =====
Image Gallery (Click "Show" to view)
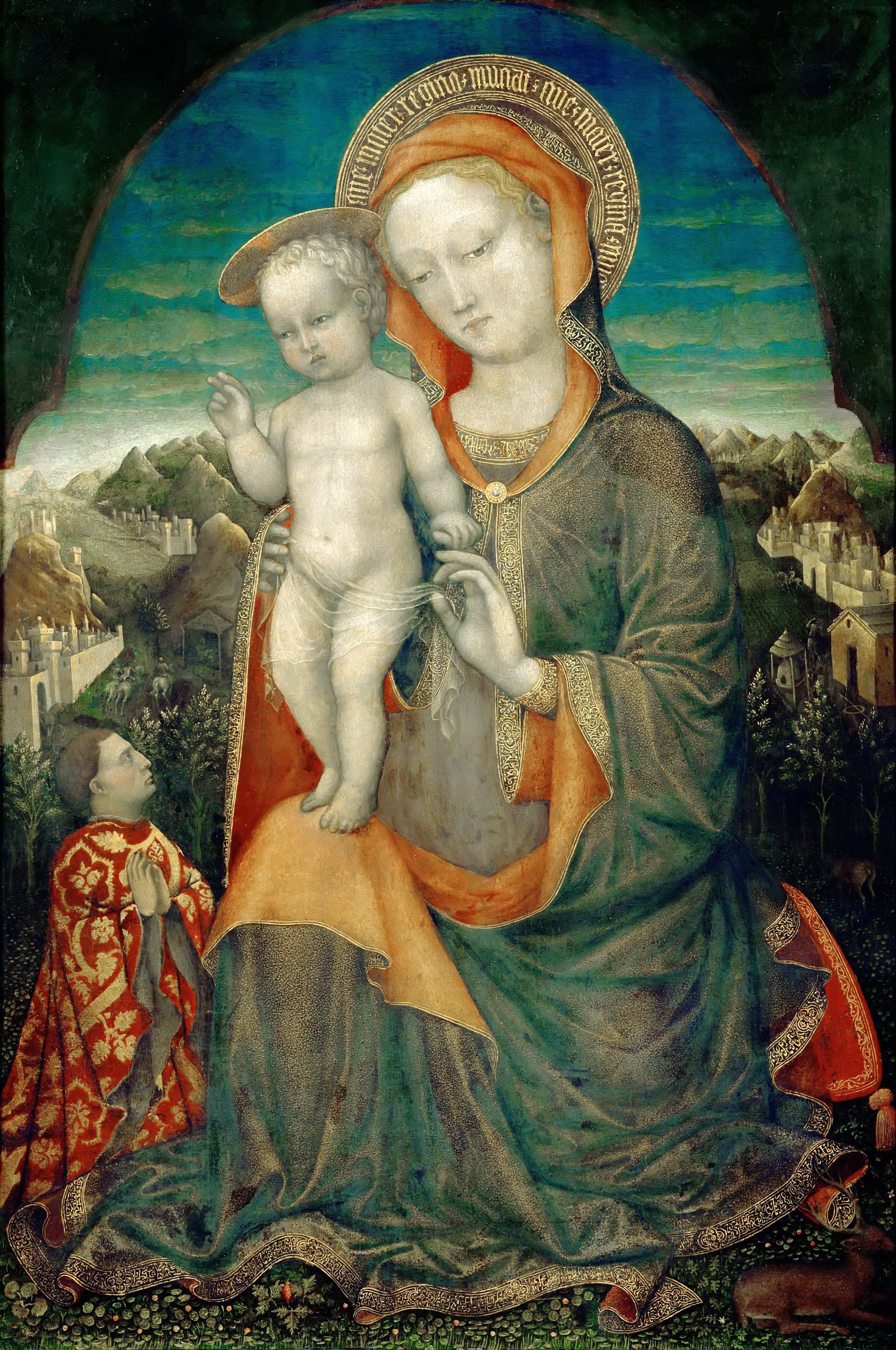
Jacopo Bellini, Virgin of Humility, adored by a prince of the House of Este (c. 1440, Louvre). Note the Pseudo-Kufic mantle hem.

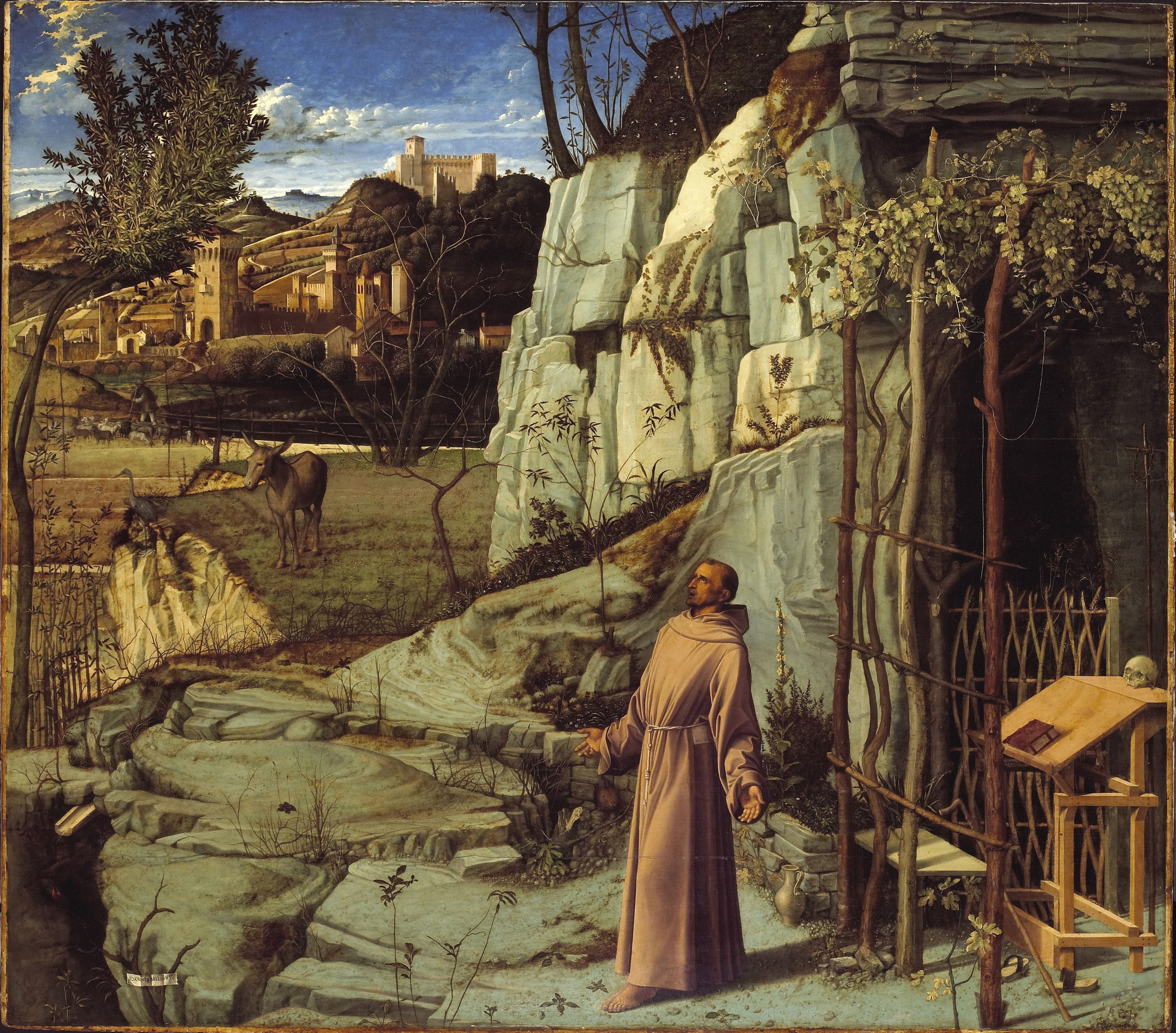
Giovanni Bellini, Saint Francis in the Desert (c. 1480, The Frick).

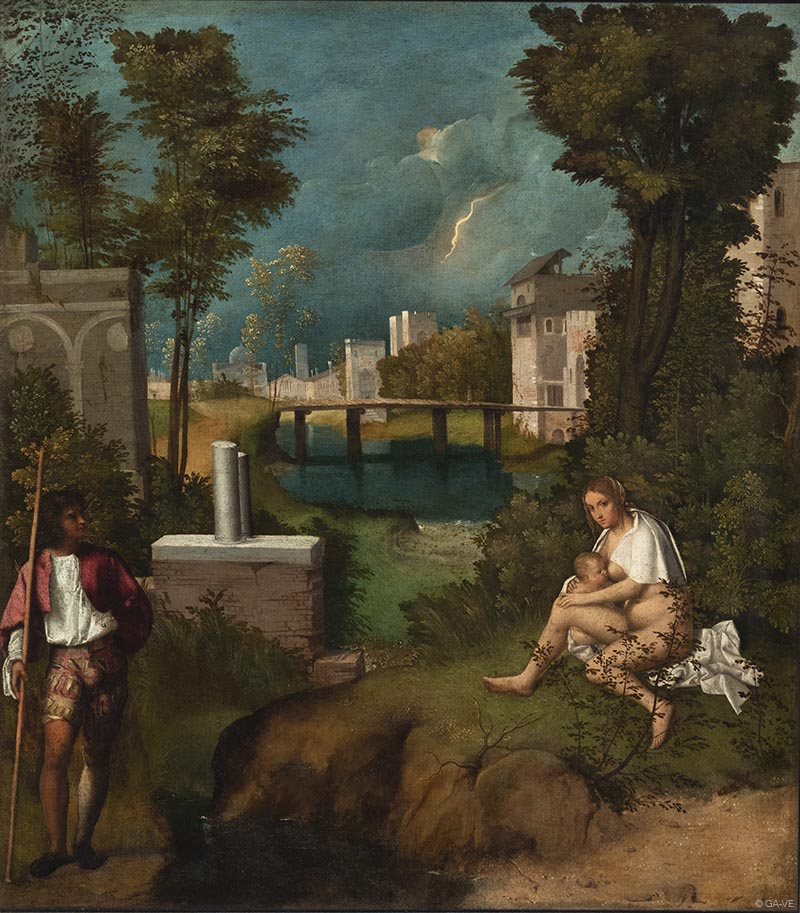
Giorgione, The Tempest (c. 1505, Gallerie dell'Accademia).

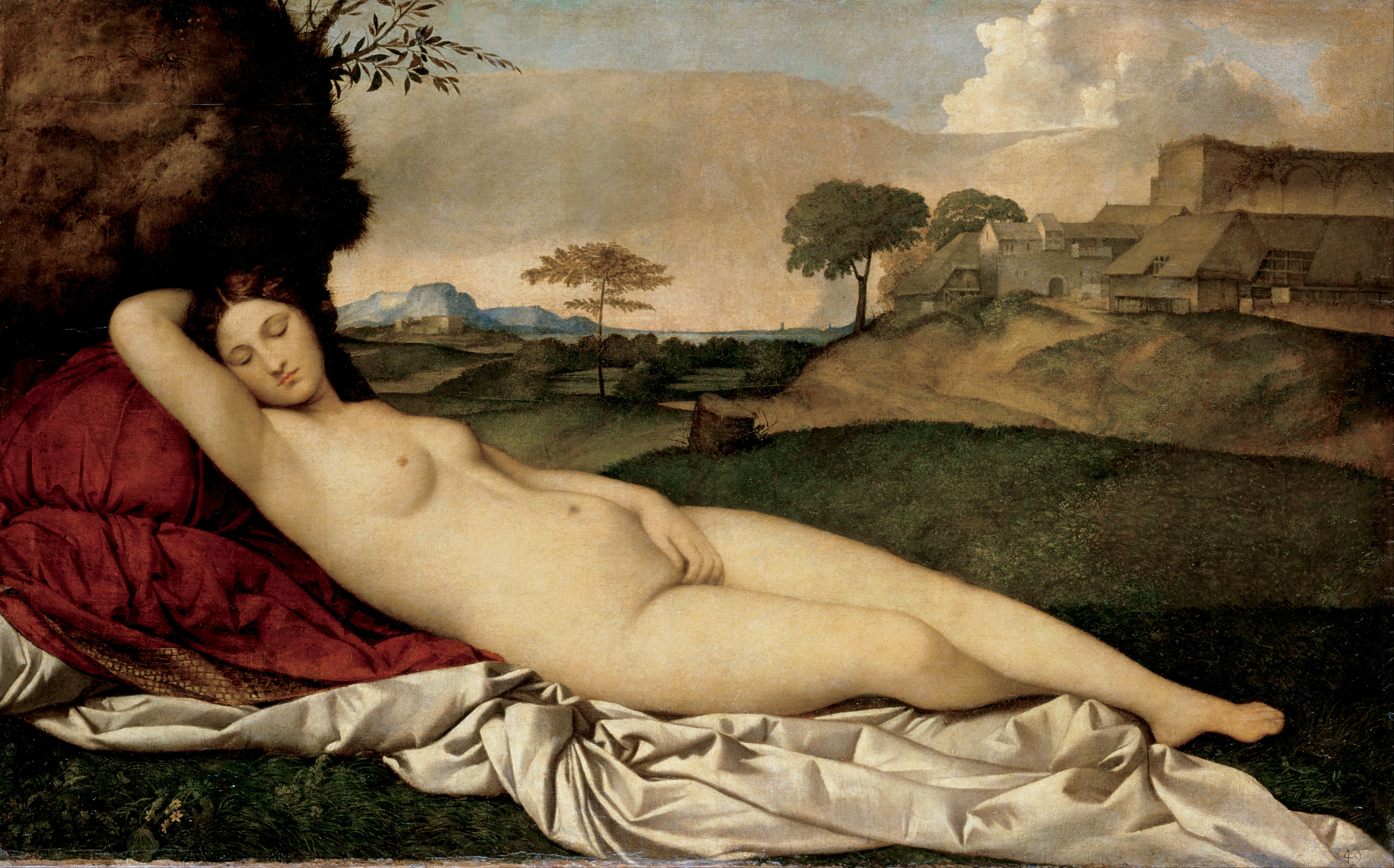
Giorgone, Sleeping Venus (c. 1510, Staatliche Kunstsammlungen Dresden).

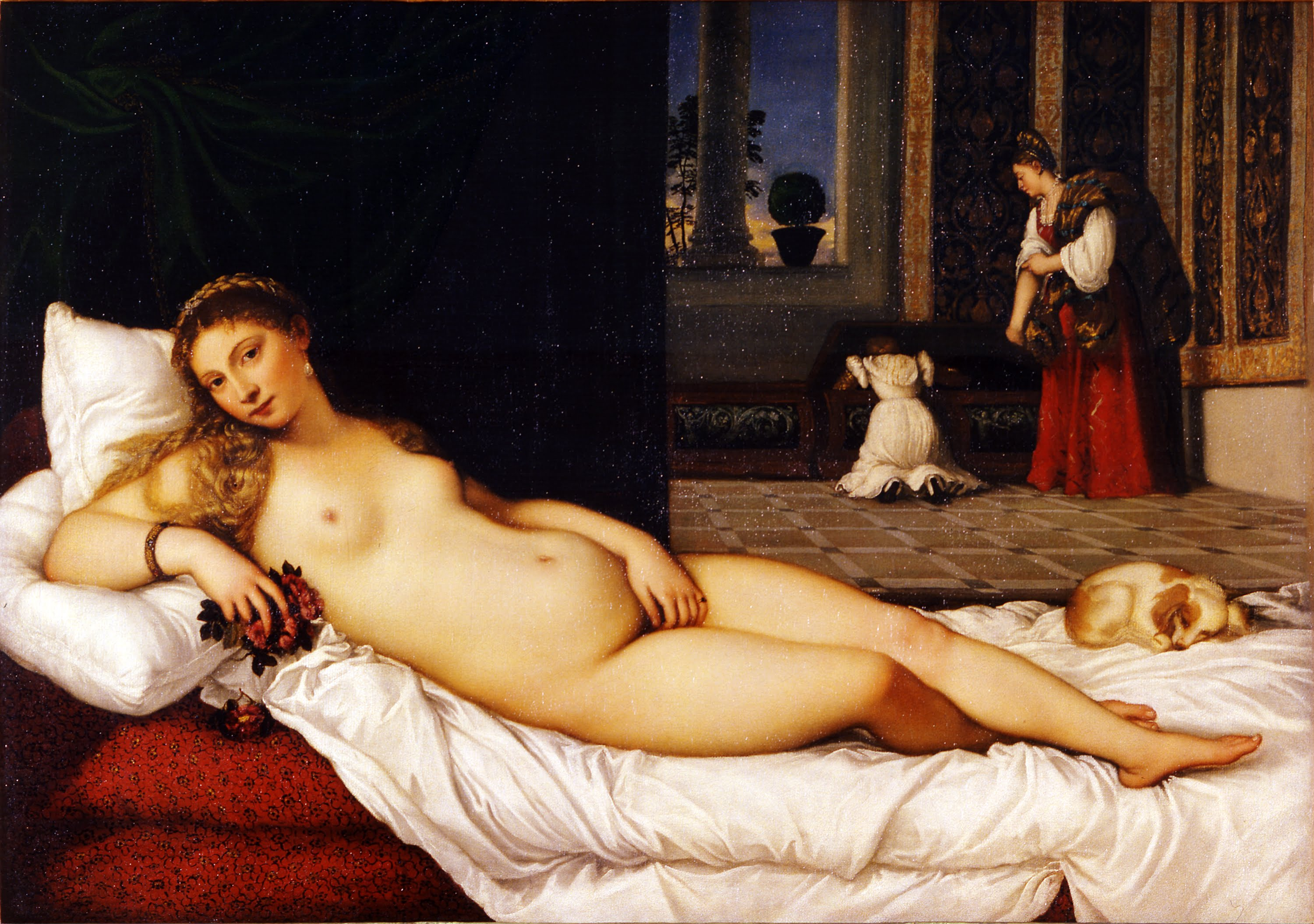
Titian, Venus of Urbino (1538, Uffizi Gallery).

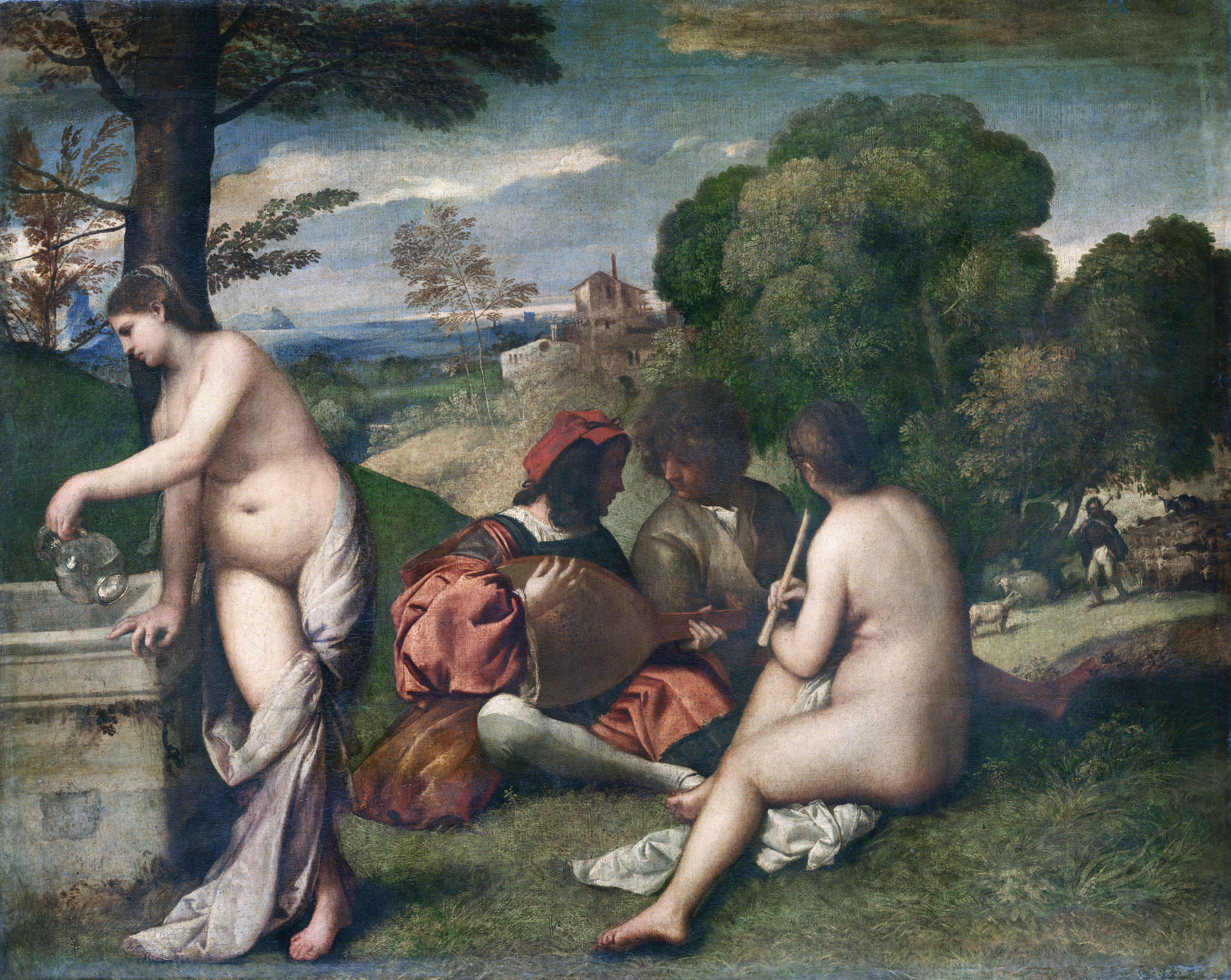
Titian, or possibly Giorgone, Pastoral Concert (1509, Louvre).

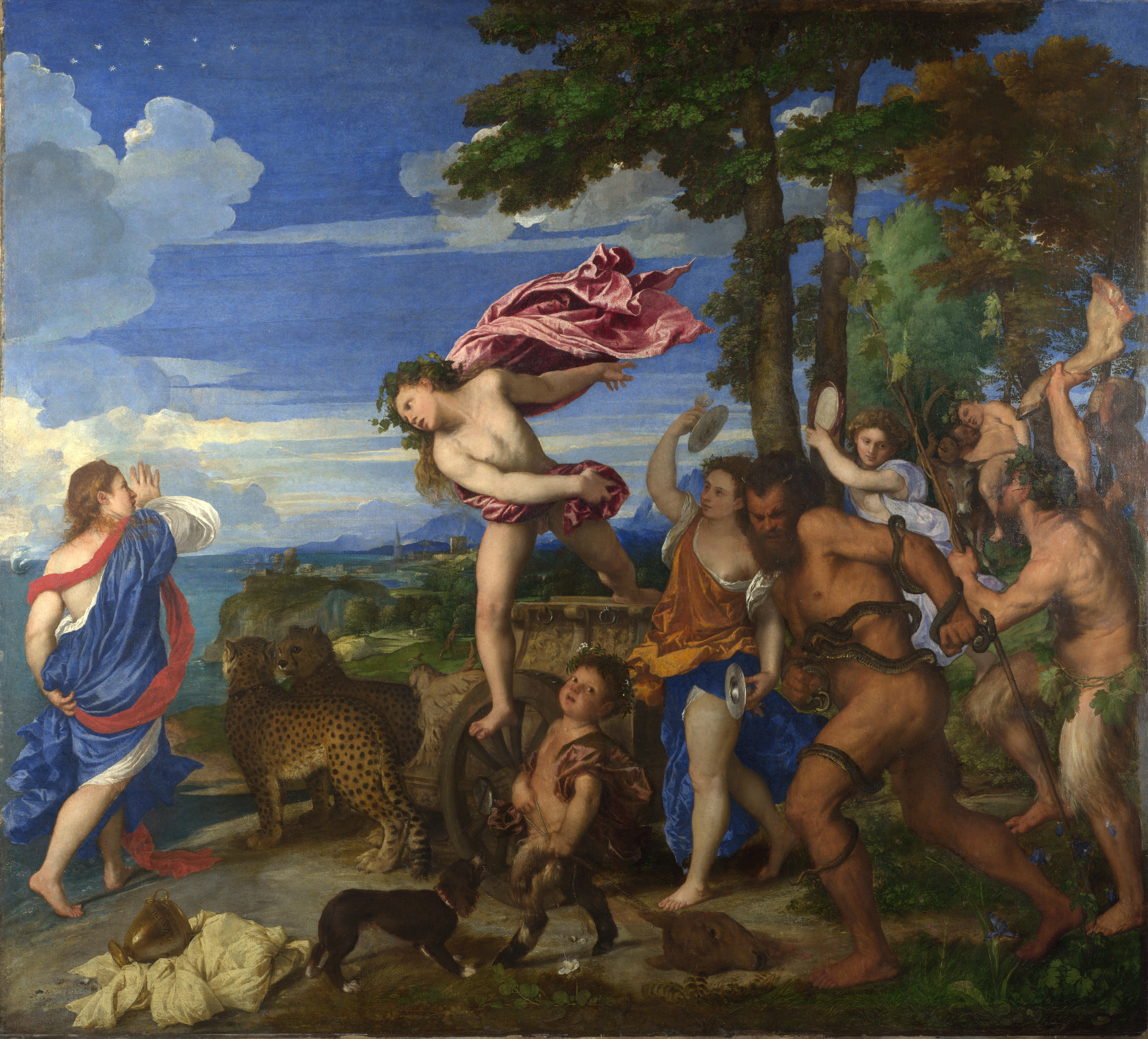
Titian, Bacchus and Ariadne (c. 1520, National Gallery).

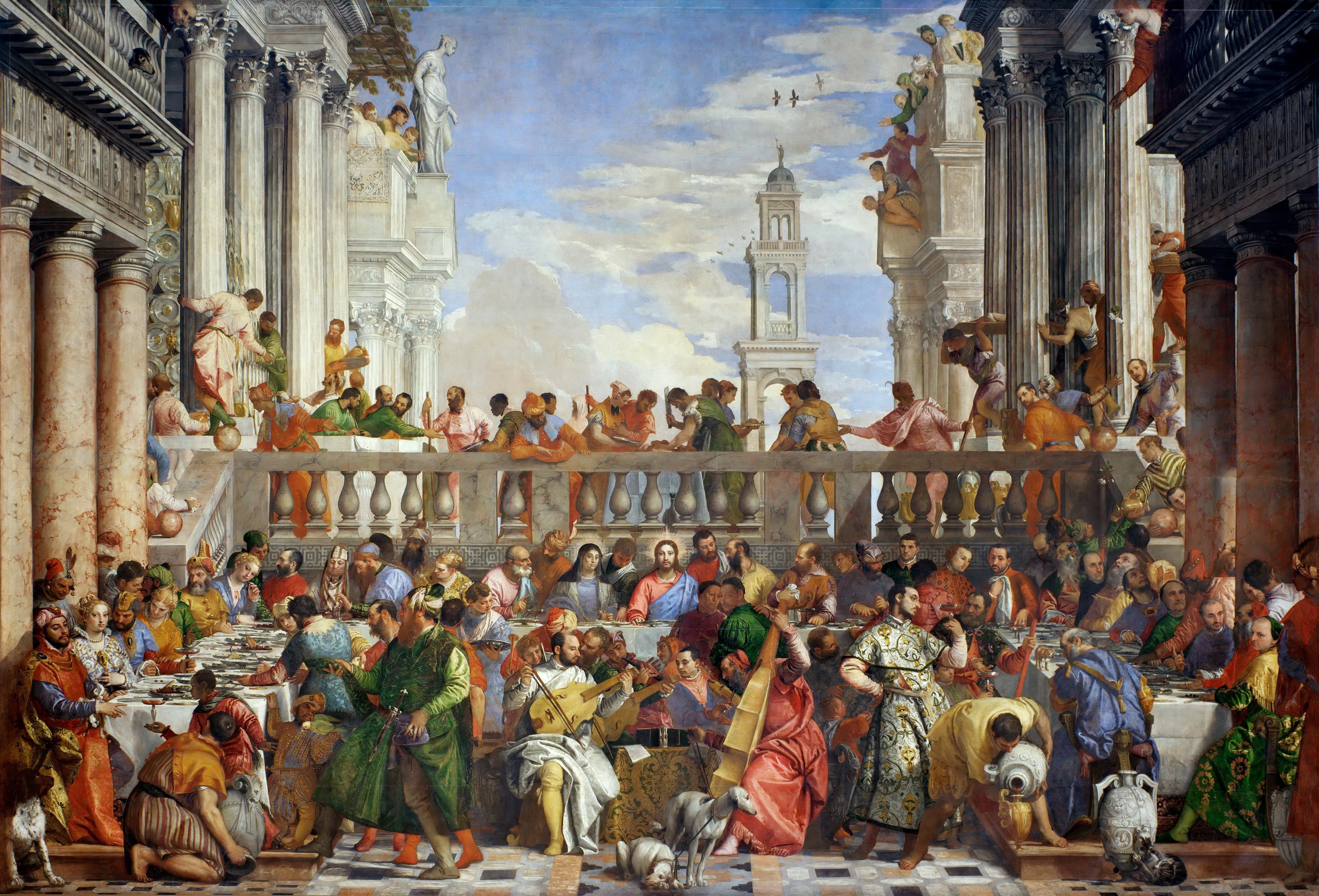
Paolo Veronese, The Wedding at Cana (1563, Louvre).

Venetian Renaissance painters developed a more naturalistic style, painting spontaneously, with less concern for precise drawing than richness of color. They include Jacopo (c. 1400–c. 1470), Gentile (c. 1429–1507), and Giovanni Bellini (c. 1430–1516), and Jacopo's son-in-law Andrea Mantegna (c. 1431–1506), musician Giorgione (c. 1475–1510), Titian (c. 1490–1576), and Veronese (1528–1588).

===== Mannerism =====
Image Gallery (Click "Show" to view)
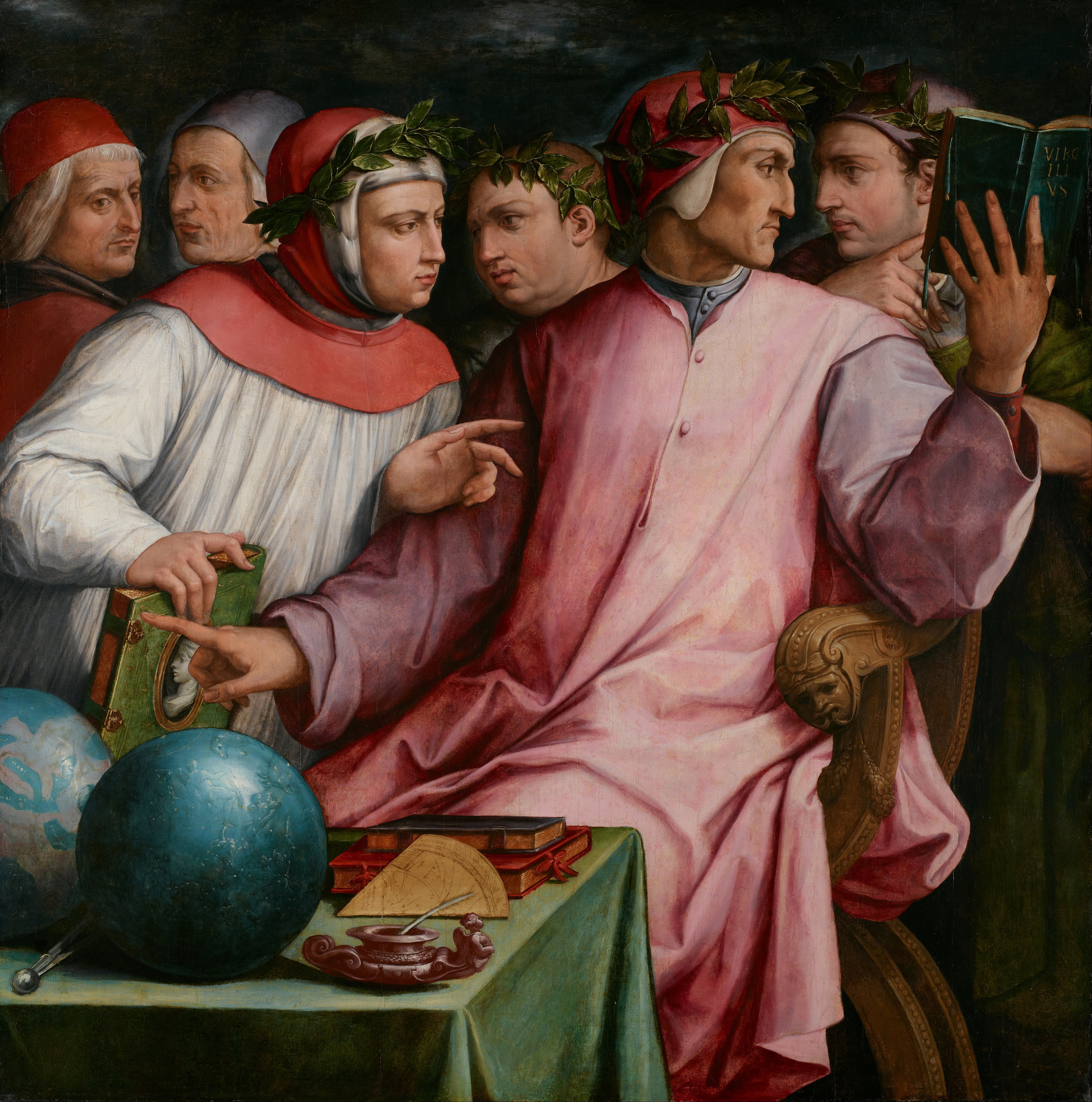
Giorgio Vasari, Six Tuscan Poets (1544, Minneapolis Institute of Art).

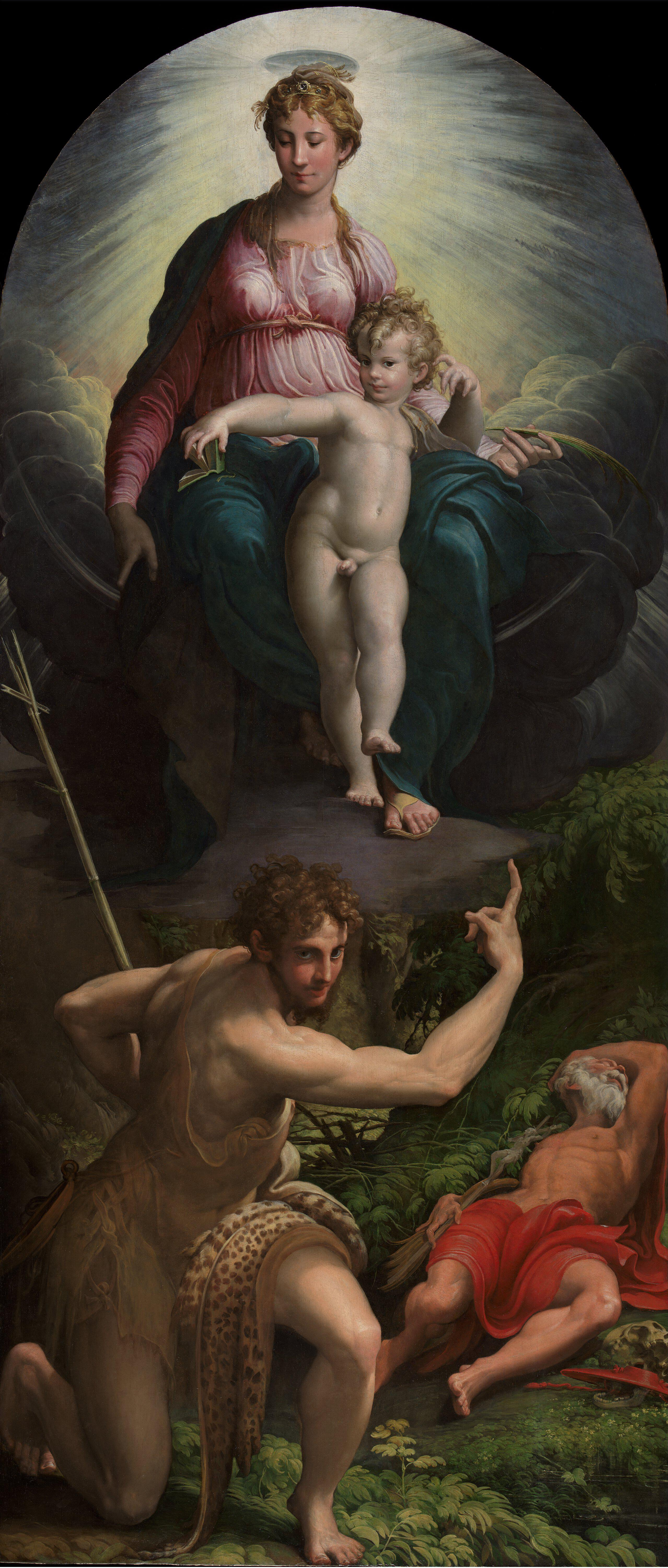
Parmigianino, Vision of Saint Jerome (1527, National Gallery). According to Vasari, this painting stupefied imperial troops who burst into Parmigianino's workshop during the Sack of Rome, allowing him to flee later.

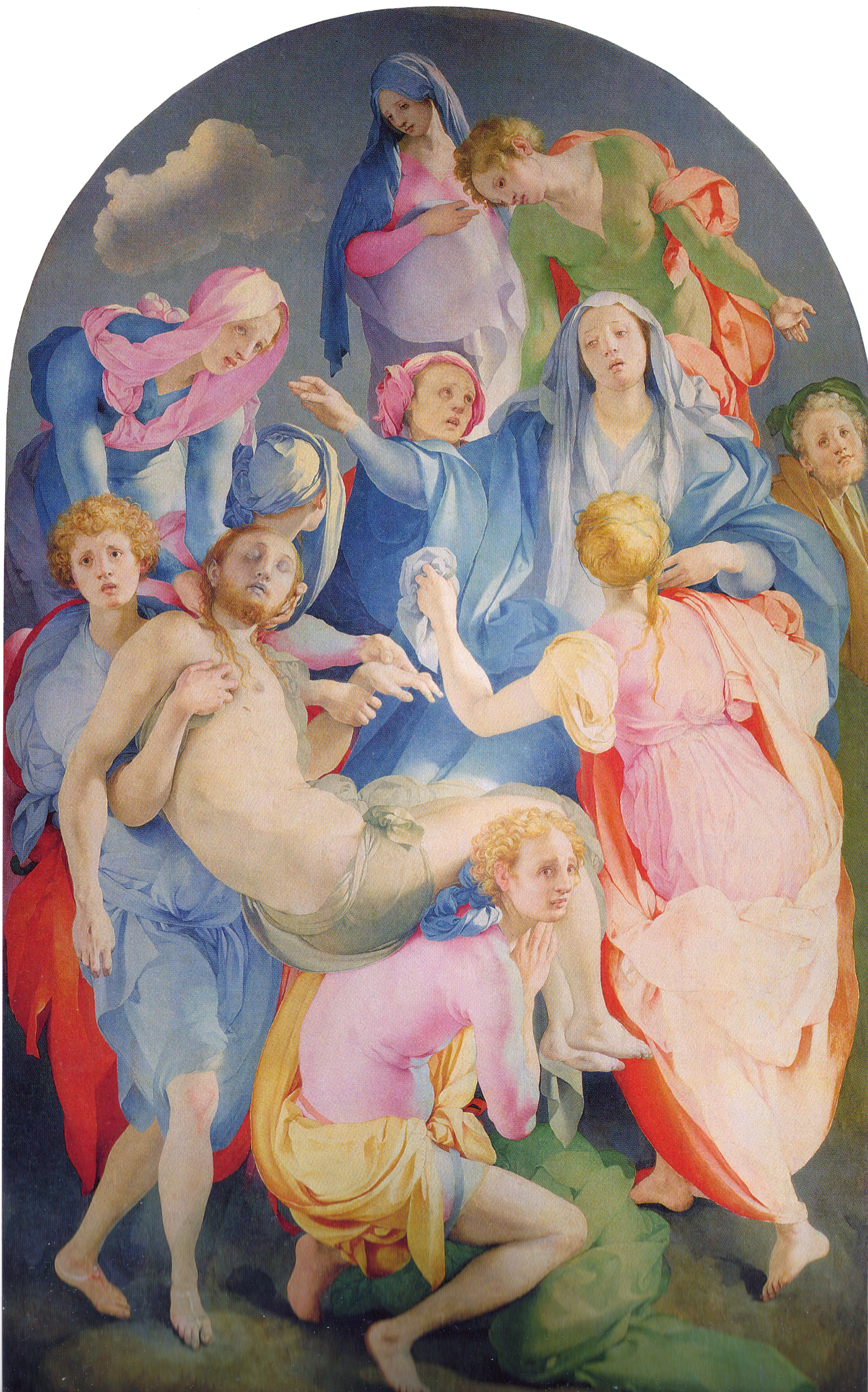
Pontormo, The Deposition from the Cross (c. 1525, Santa Felicita).

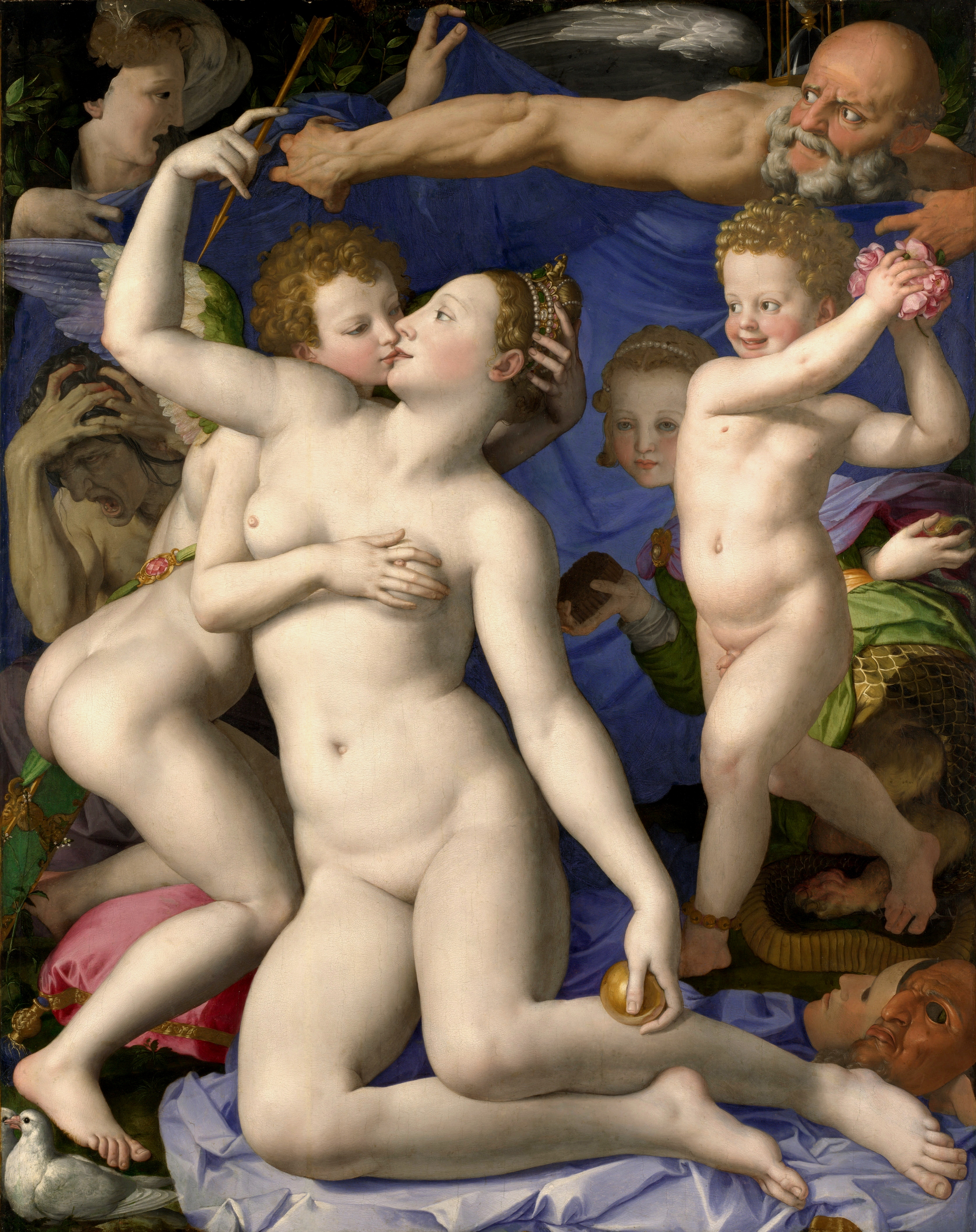
Bronzino, Venus, Cupid, Folly and Time (c. 1545, National Gallery).

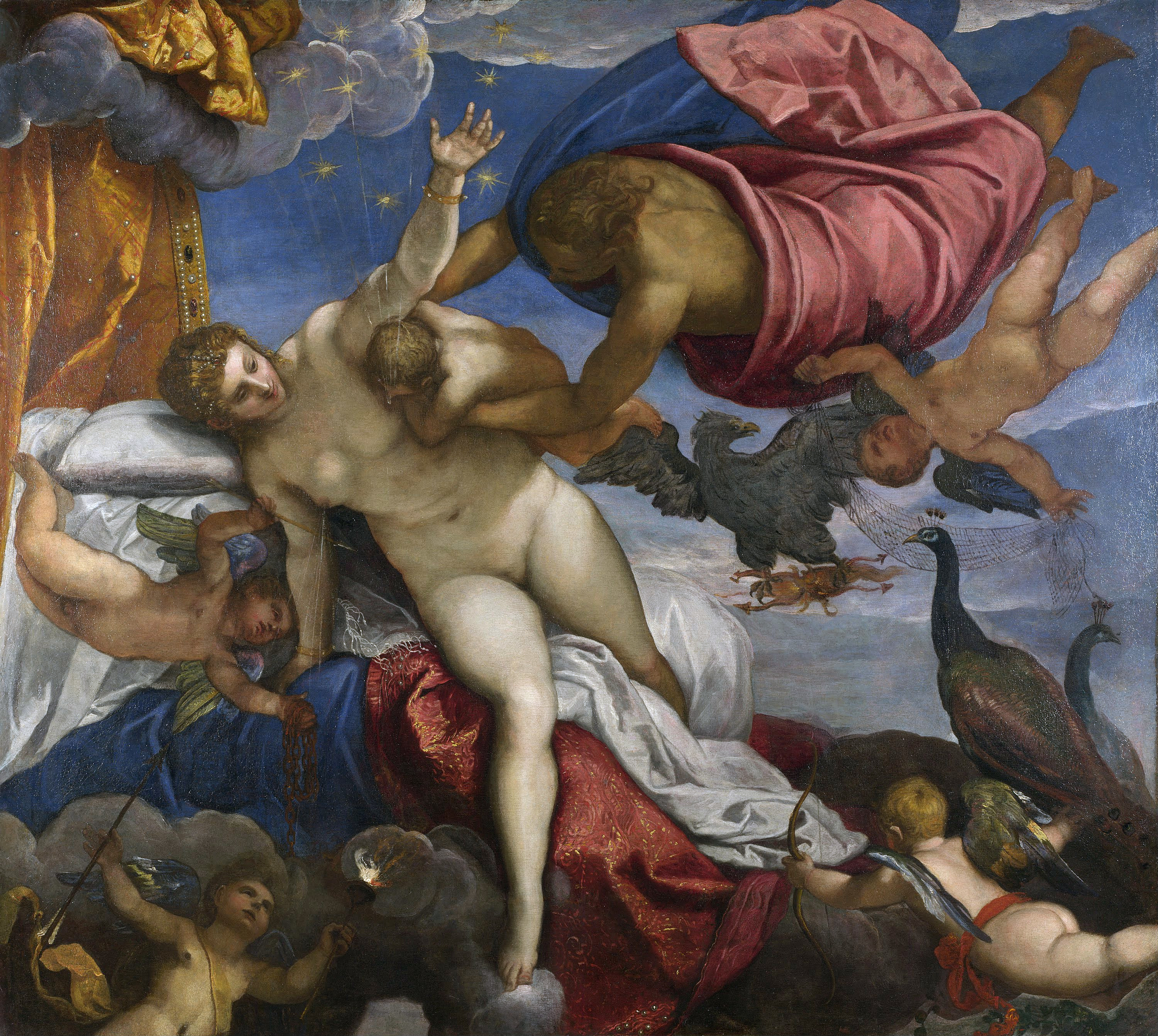
Jacopo Tintoretto, The Origin of the Milky Way (c. 1575, National Gallery).

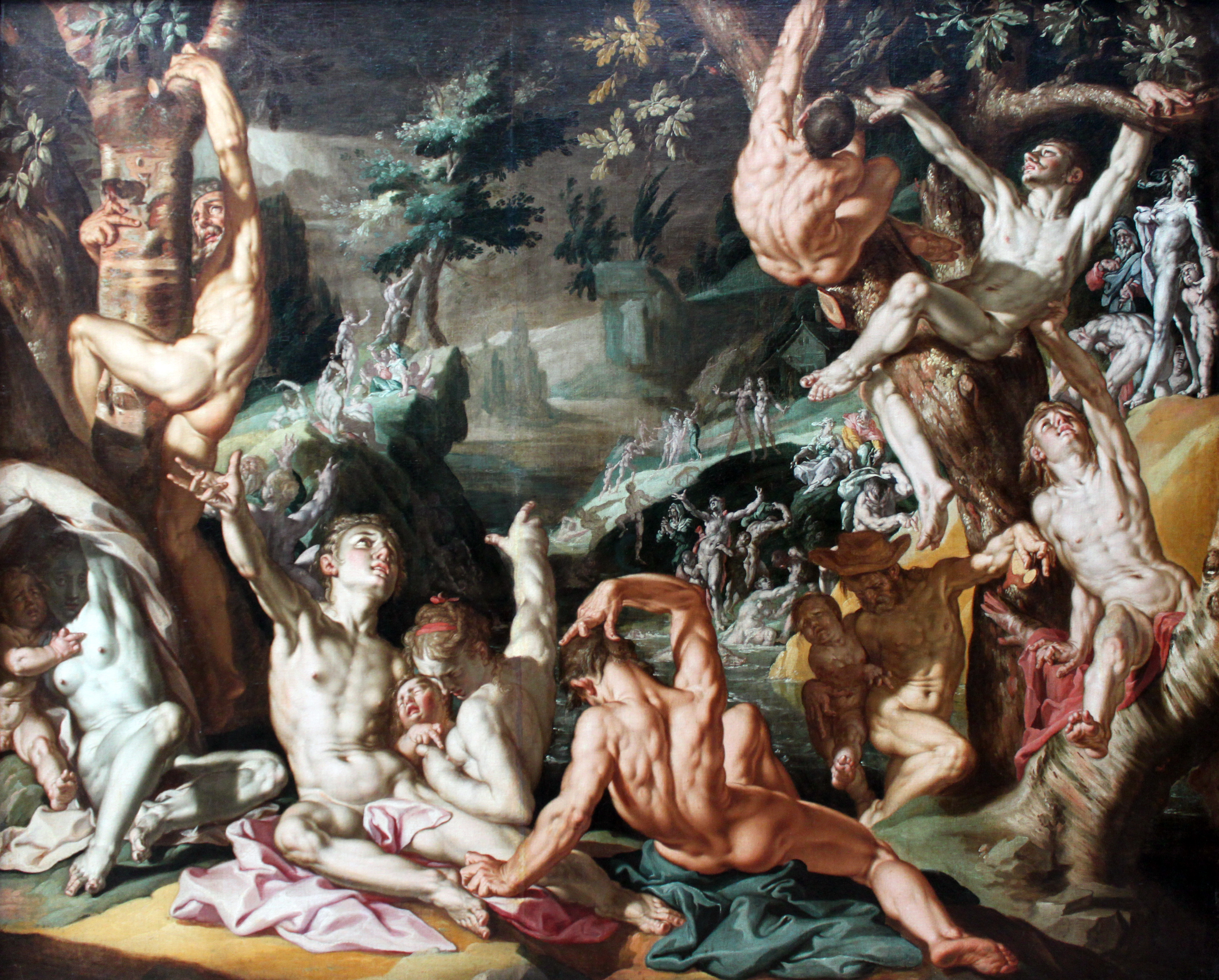
Joachim Wtewael, The Great Floode (1595, Germanisches Nationalmuseum).

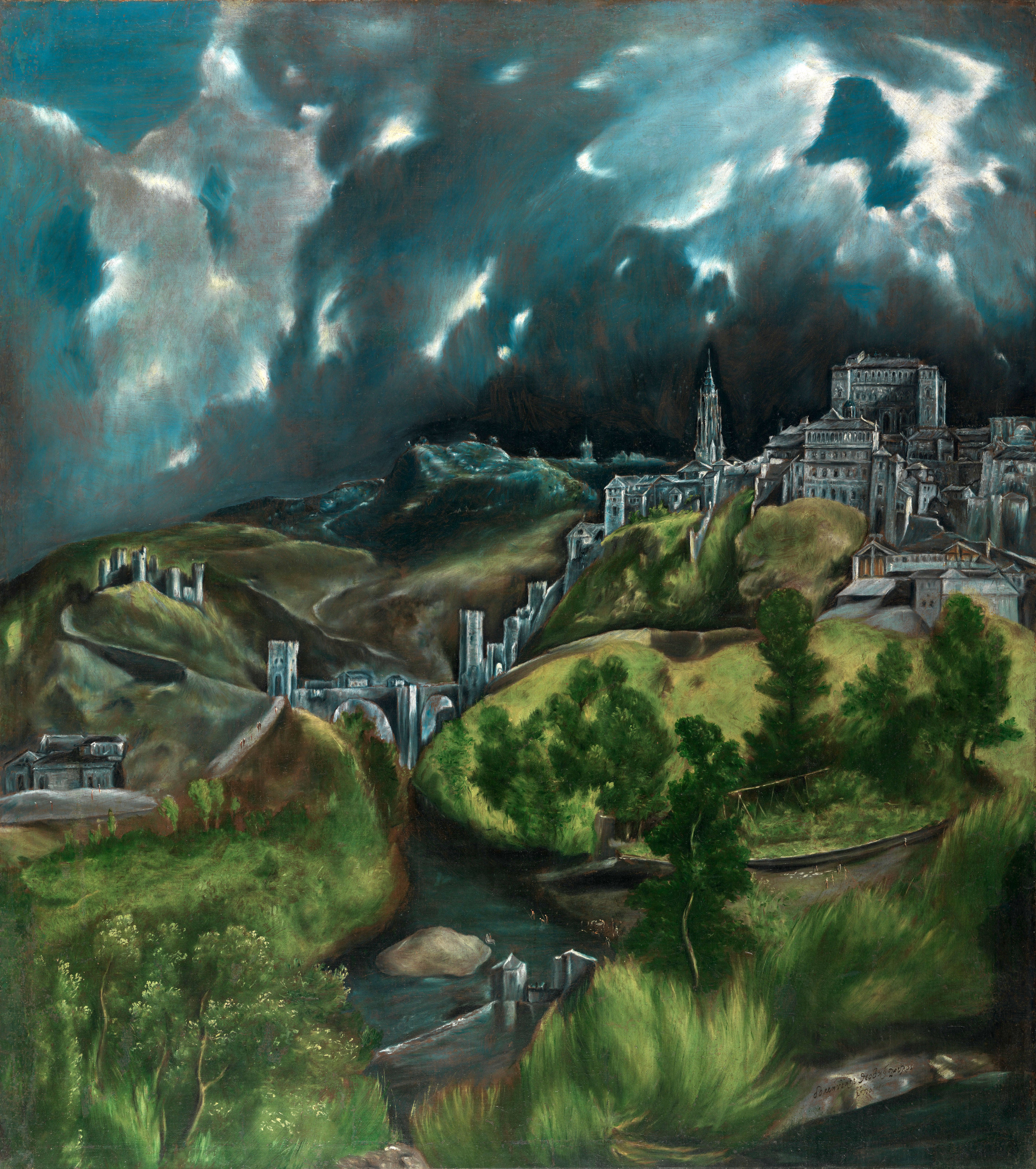
El Greco, View of Toledo (c. 1596, Metropolitan Museum of Art).

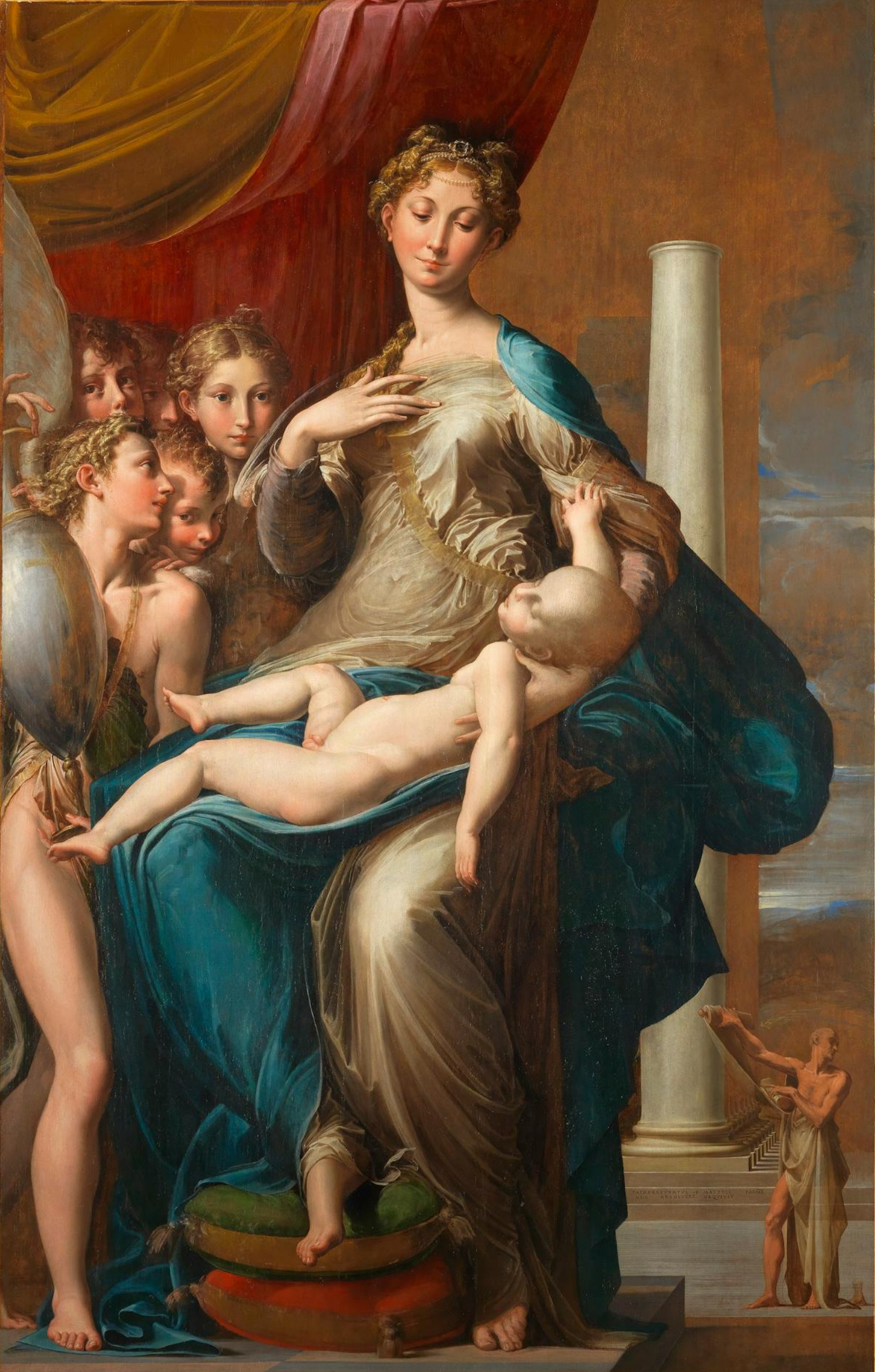
Parmigianino, Madonna with the Long Neck (c. 1535, Uffizi Gallery).

After 1520, the High Renaissance gave rise to a stylized art known as Mannerism, characterized by long necks and limbs. Mannerist Giorgio Vasari (1511–1574) authored The Lives, and Parmigianino (1503–1540) fled the Sack of Rome (1527).

Italian Mannerists such as Pontormo (1494–1557), Tintoretto (1518–1594), and Bronzino (1503–1572) paint restless and unstable compositions, with extreme effects of perspective, and stylized poses. Pontormo replaced Renaissance serenity with troubled expressions; as Spanish Renaissance painter El Greco (1541–1614) did with emotional intensity.

The Northern Mannerists included Frenchmen influenced by the School of Fontainebleau, such as Jean Cousin the Elder (1500–1592) and François Clouet (c. 1510–1572); Antwerp Mannerists Herri met de Bles (c. 1490–1567), Jan Wellens de Cock (c. 1460–c. 1520), Jan Gossart (1478–1532), and Bartholomeus Spranger (1546–1611); and Dutchmen Cornelis Engebrechtsz (c. 1462–1527), Hendrick Goltzius (1558–1617), Jan Gossaert (c. 1478–1532), Lucas van Leyden (1494–1534), Karel van Mander (1548–1606), Cornelis van Haarlem (1562–1638), and Joachim Wtewael (1566–1638).

=== Northern Renaissance ===
==== Early Netherlandish painting ====
Image Gallery (Click "Show" to view)
Melchior Broederlam, Crucifixion Altarpiece, Annunciation and Visitation (c. 1399, Musée des Beaux-Arts de Dijon).

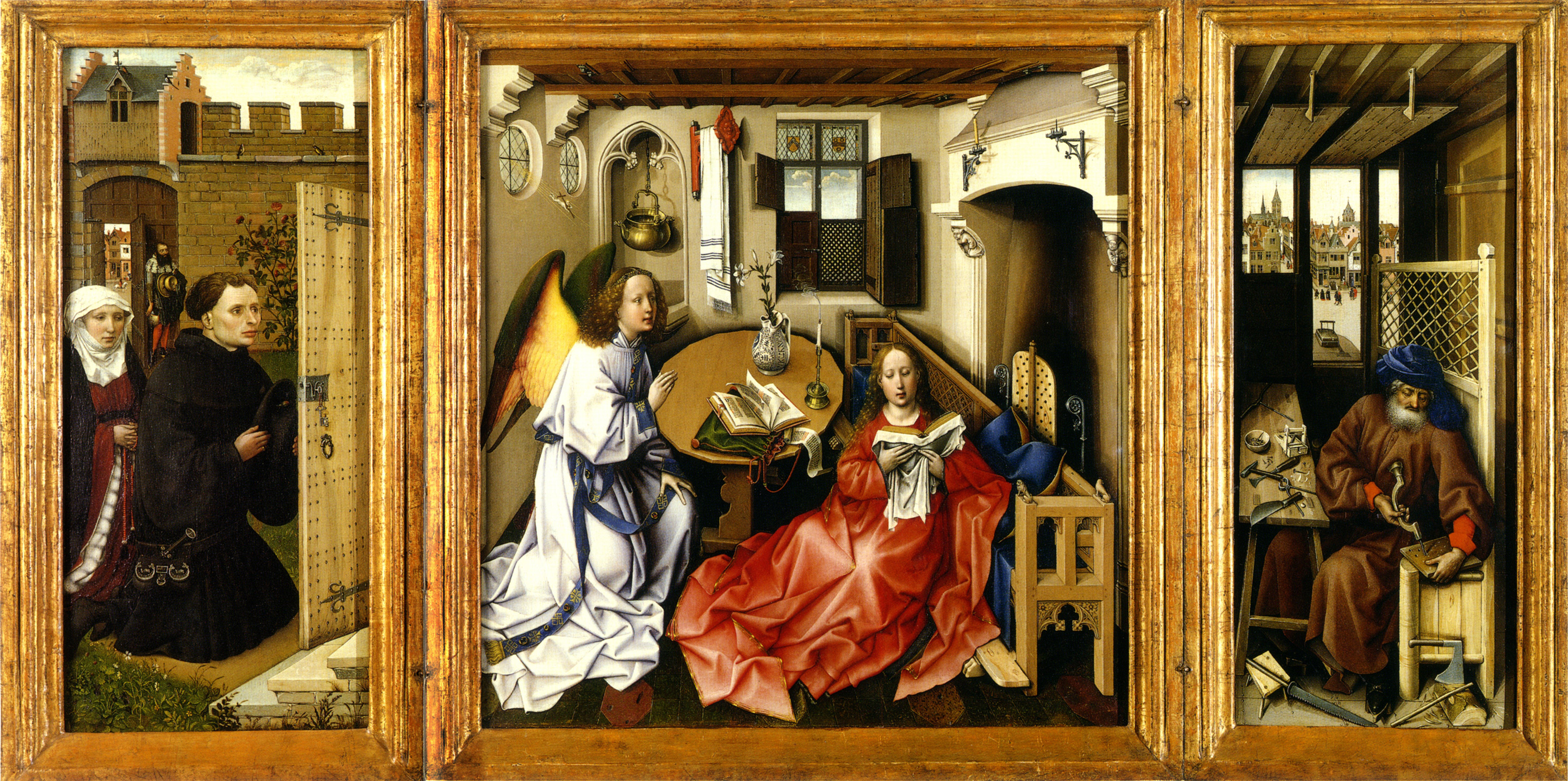
Robert Campin, Mérode Altarpiece (c. 1427, The Cloisters). Central panel L'Annonciation by Campin, with side panels done by an assistant.

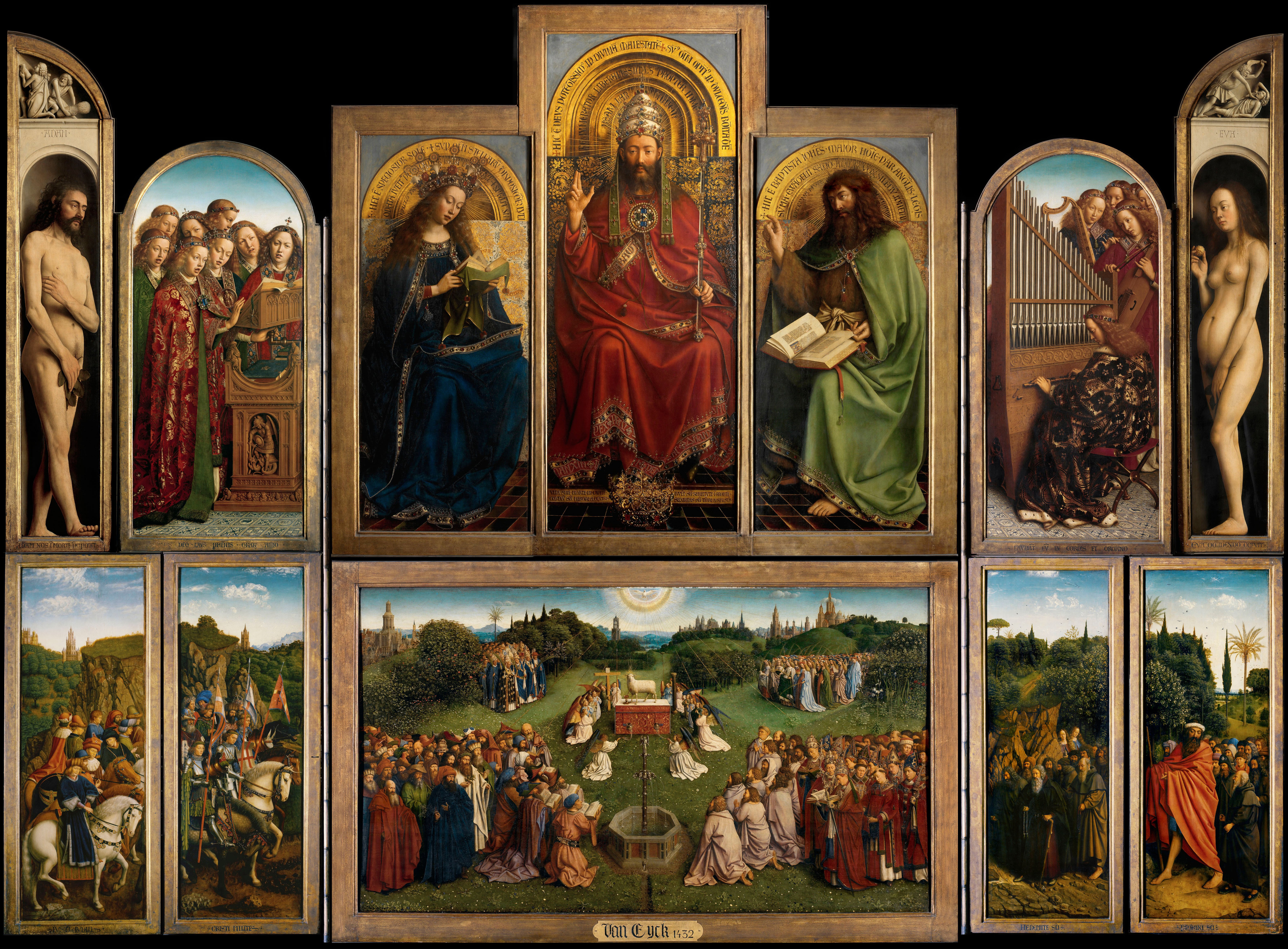
Jan van Eyck, Ghent Altarpiece in Saint Bavo's Cathedral, Ghent (1432)

Jan Van Eyck, Portrait of a Man (1433, National Gallery).

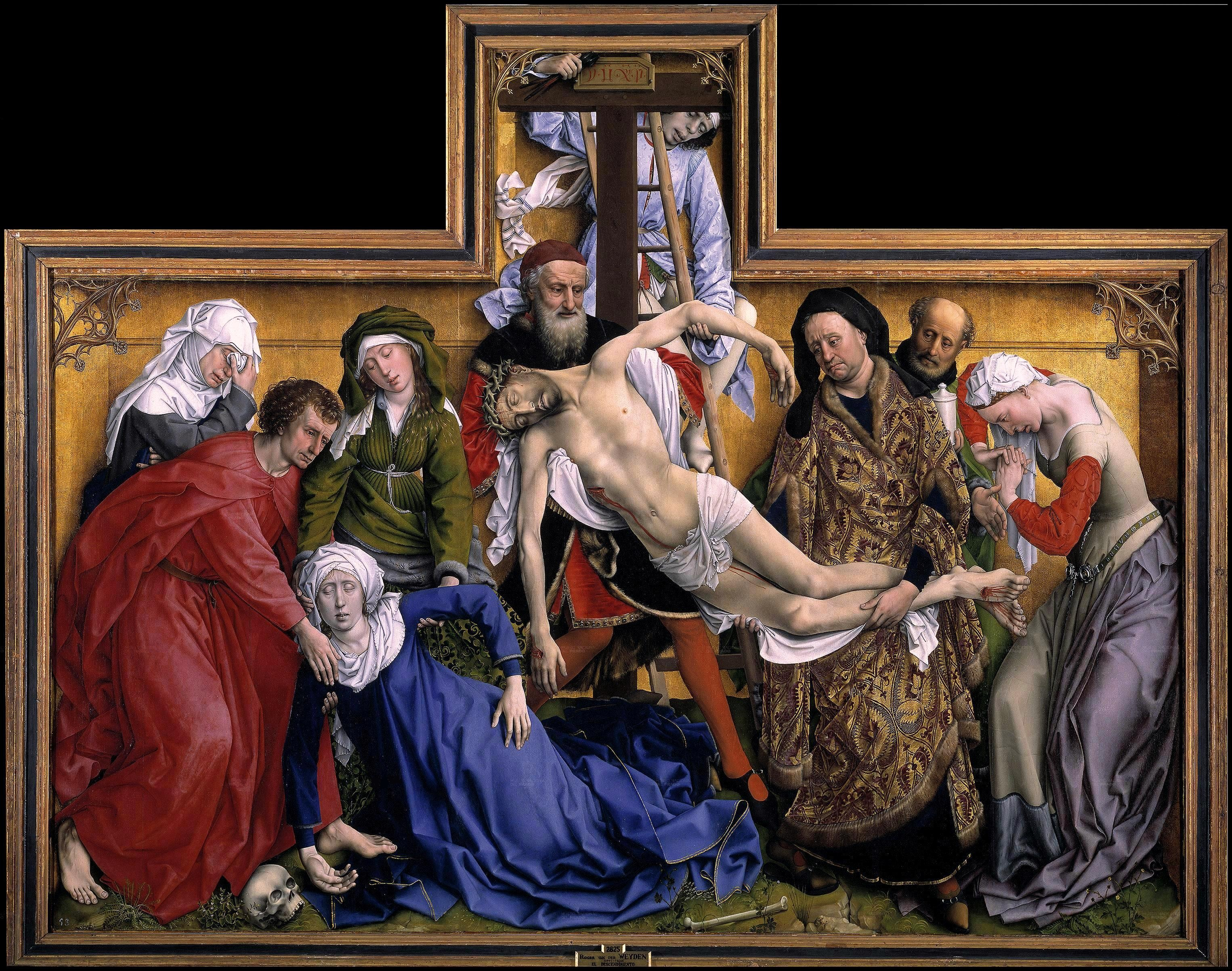
Rogier van der Weyden, Descent from the Cross (c. 1435, Museo del Prado). One of the best known works of the 15th century, and the most influential Netherlandish painting of Christ's crucifixion.

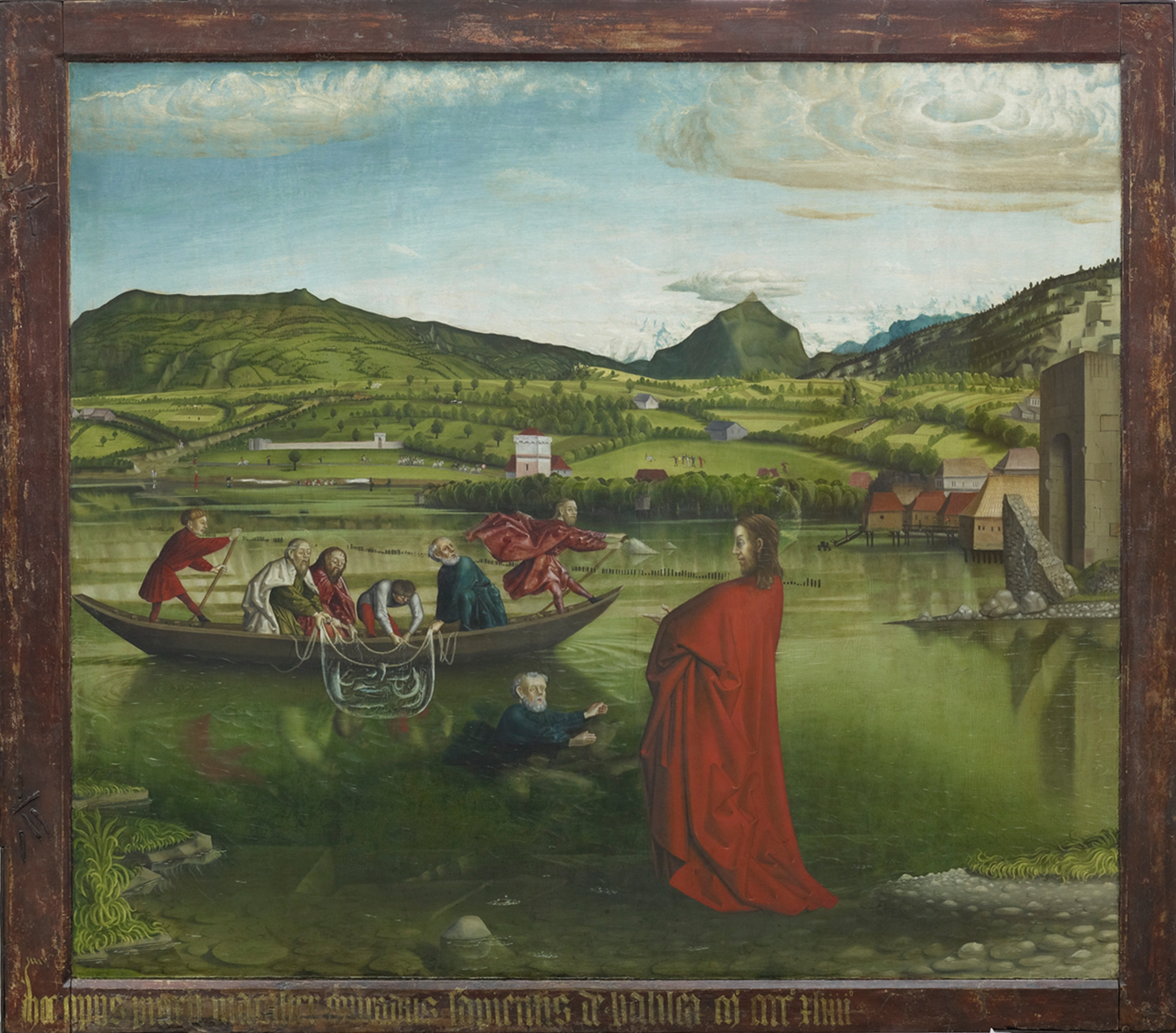
Konrad Witz, The Miraculous Draft of Fishes (1444, Musée d'Art et d'Histoire). The Sea of Galilee depicted as Lake Geneva.

Hieronymus Bosch, The Garden of Earthly Delights (c. 1480–1505, Museo del Prado).

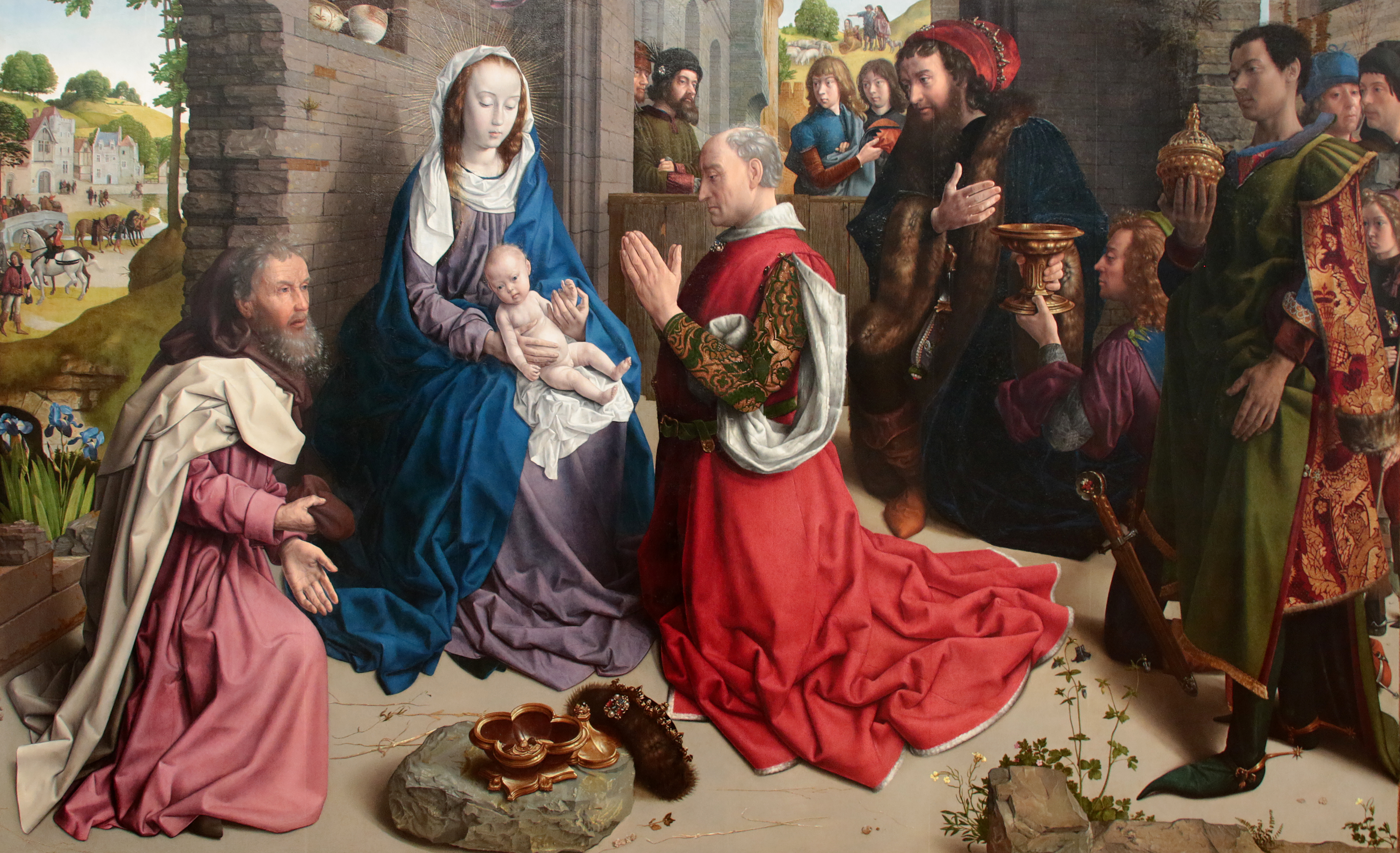
Hugo van der Goes, Monforte Altarpiece (c. 1470, Gemäldegalerie Berlin).

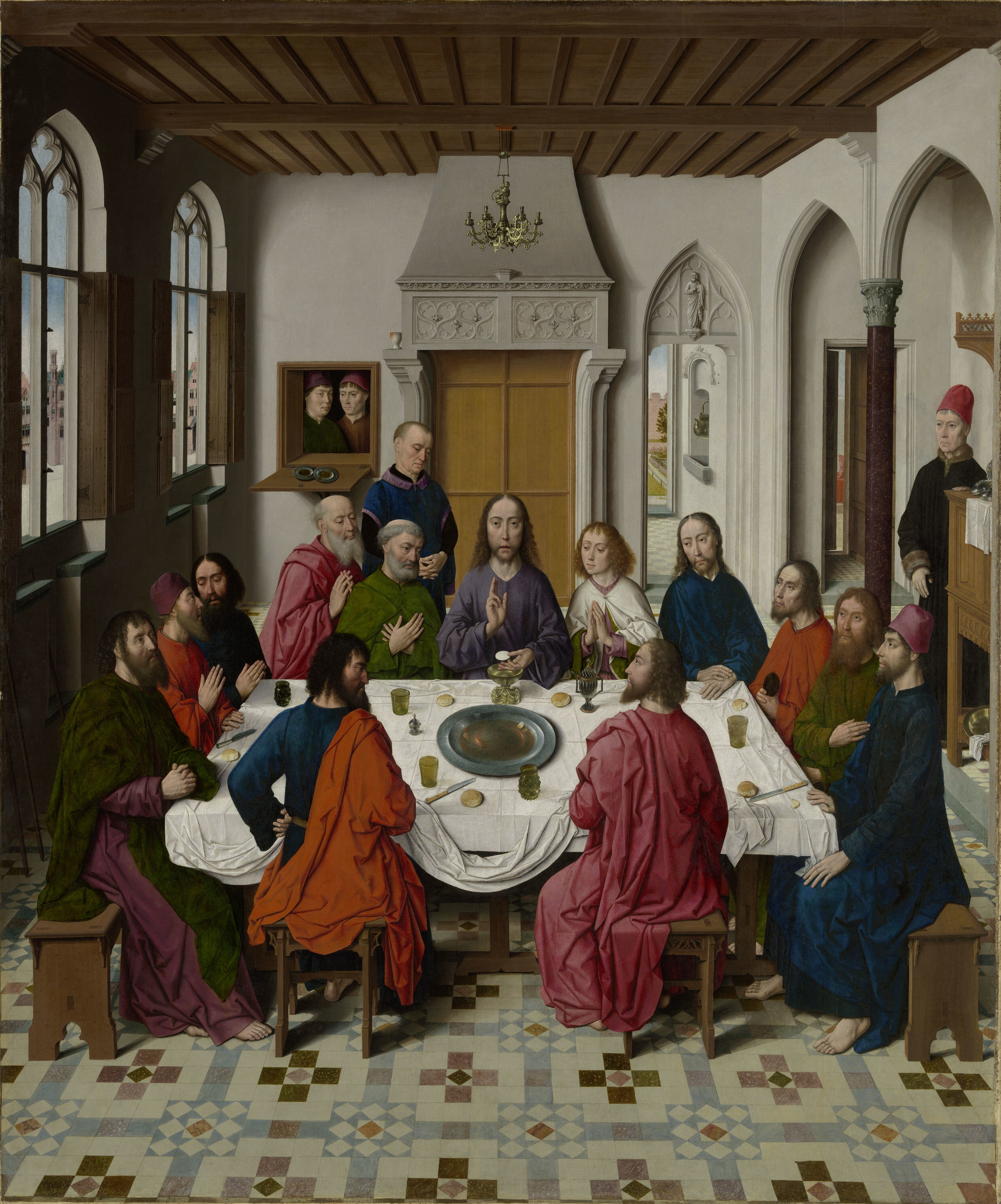
Dieric Bouts, The Last Supper (c. 1468) from Saint Peter's Church, Leuven.

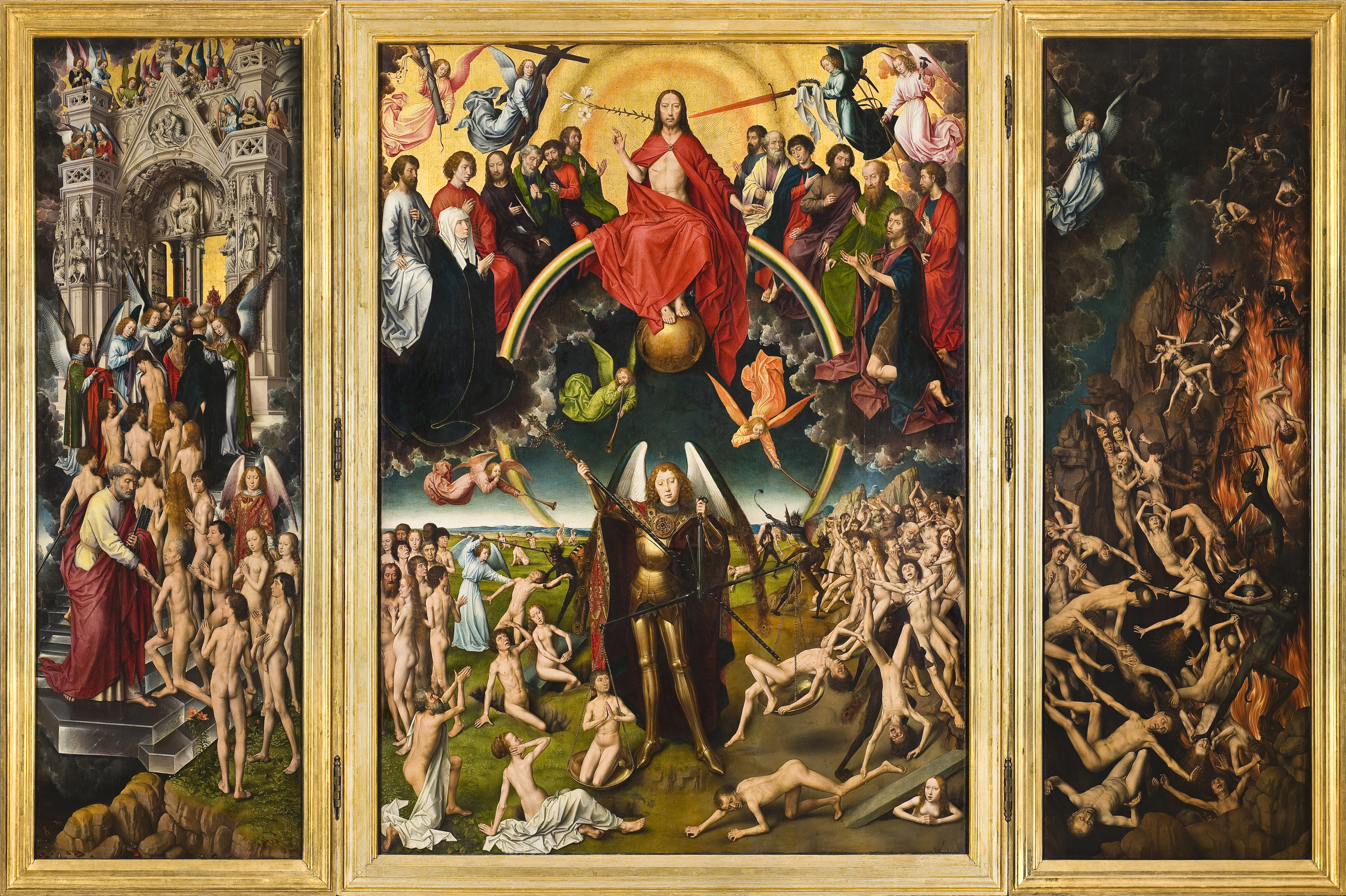
Hans Memling, The Last Judgment (c. 1473, National Museum, Gdańsk).

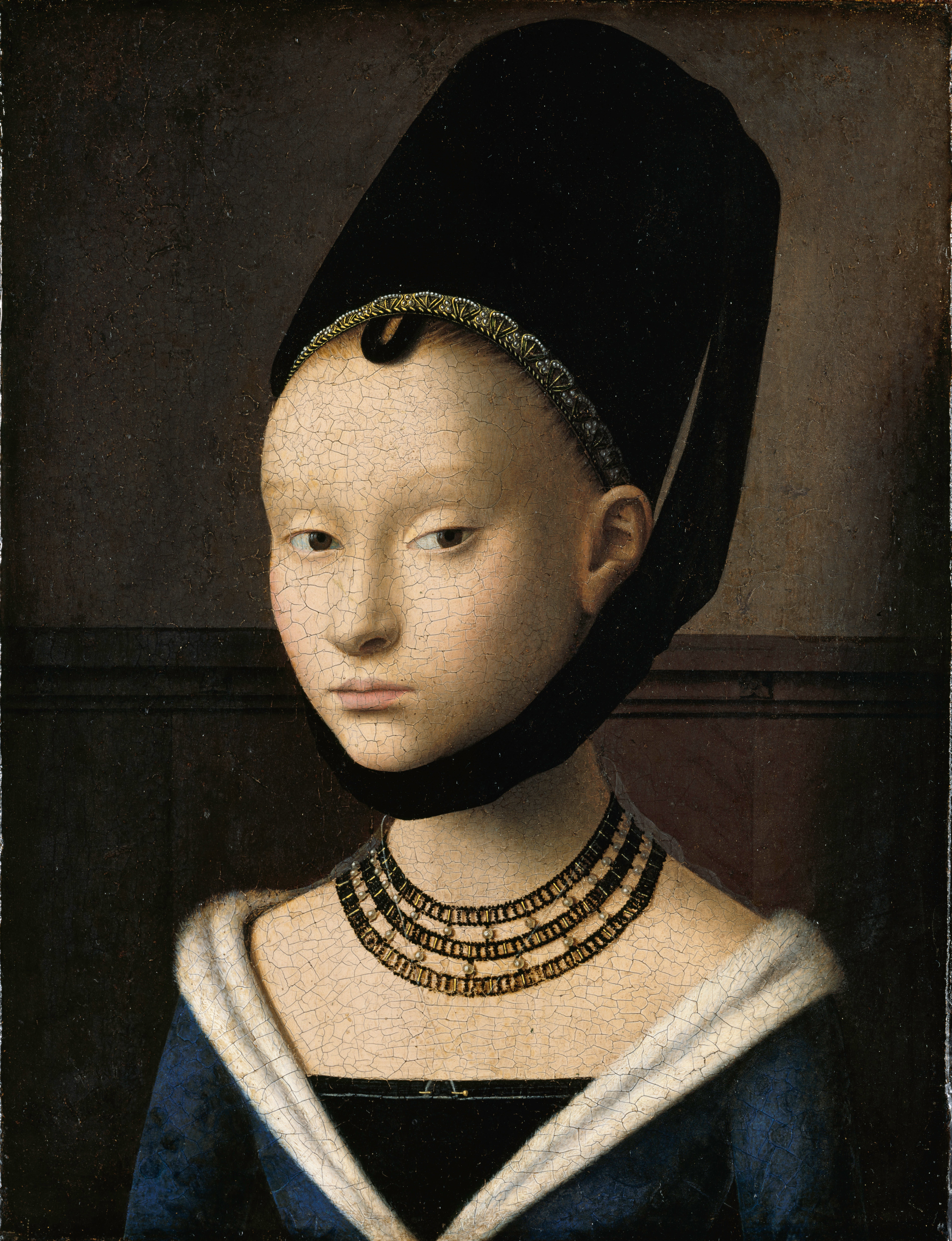
Petrus Christus, Portrait of a Young Woman (c. 1470, Gemäldegalerie).

Jan van Eyck, Arnolfini Portrait (1434, National Gallery).

The illusion of glowing light with a porcelain-like finish characterized Early Netherlandish painting, in contrast to the matte surface of tempera. Art historians Max J. Friedländer (1867–1958) and iconographer Erwin Panofsky (1892–1968) were Early Netherlandish painting scholars.

In Flanders, artists inspired by illuminators like the Limbourg Brothers (fl. 1385–1416) began painting more naturalistically. Unlike Italians, who drew heavily from ancient Rome, German and Northern Renaissance painters retained the less idealized style of sculpture and medieval illuminated manuscripts.

The adoption of oil painting, traditionally, but erroneously, credited to Jan van Eyck (c. 1389–1441), made possible a new verisimilitude. Melchior Broederlam (c. 1350–1409) previously used oil paint, but Robert Campin (c. 1378–1444, previously known as the Master of Flémalle) and van Eyck honed the technique, creating richer colors with a deep, intense tonality.

Campin's pupil Rogier van der Weyden (1400–1464) stressed human emotion and drama. Konrad Witz (c. 1400–c. 1445) painted some of the first landscapes since antiquity. Dieric Bouts (c. 1415–1475) pioneered the use of a single vanishing point among Northern painters. Hugo van der Goes (c. 1430–1482) was influential in Italy. Hieronymus Bosch (c. 1450–1516) is a remarkably extravagant painter.

Others Early Netherlandish painters include Petrus Christus (c. 1420–c. 1475), Hans Memling (c. 1430–1494), Gerard David (c. 1460–1523), Quentin Matsys (1466–1530), and Joachim Patinir (c. 1480–1524).

==== High Northern Renaissance ====
Image Gallery (Click "Show" to view)
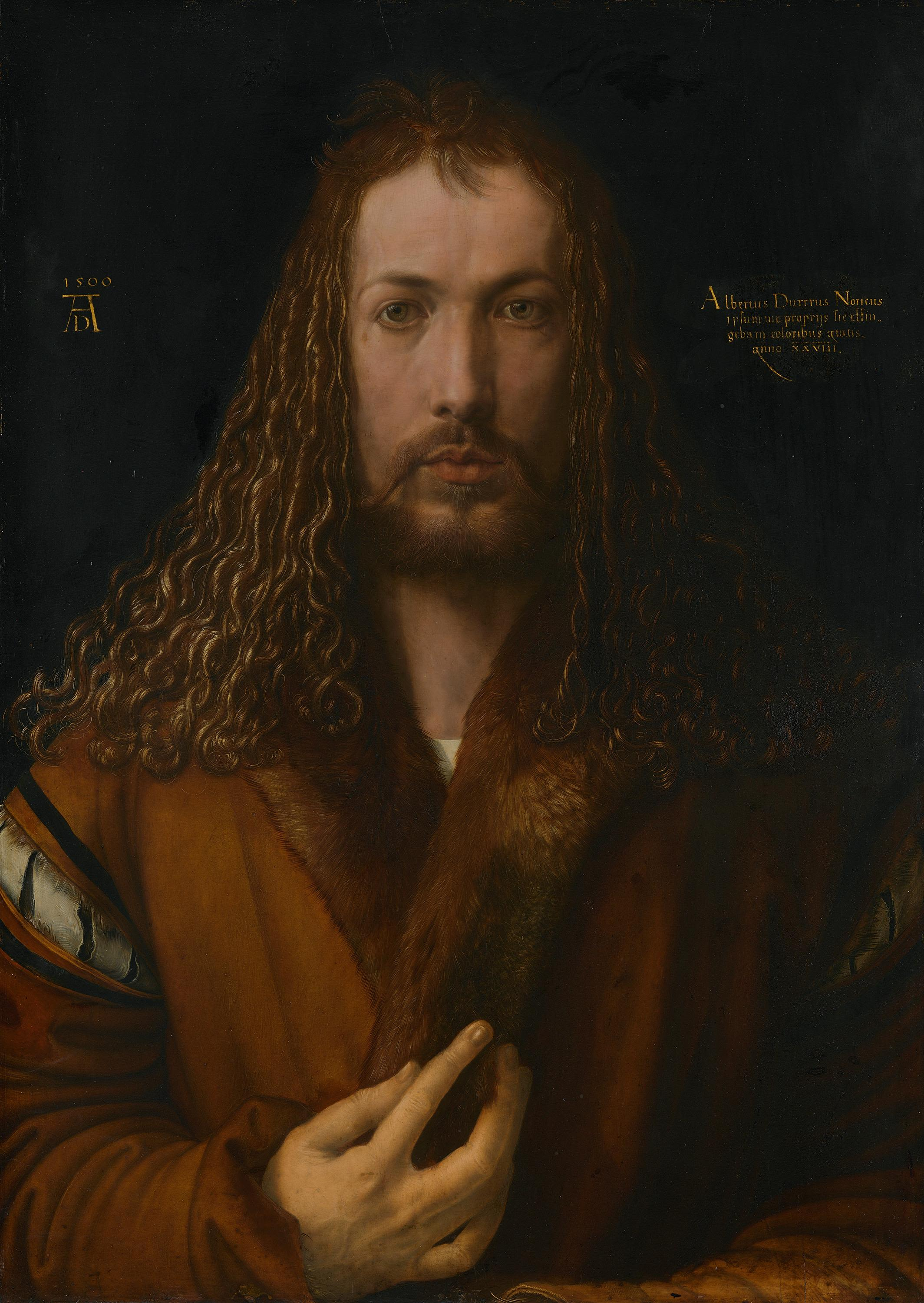
Albrecht Dürer, Self-Portrait with Fur-Trimmed Robe (1500, Alte Pinakothek).

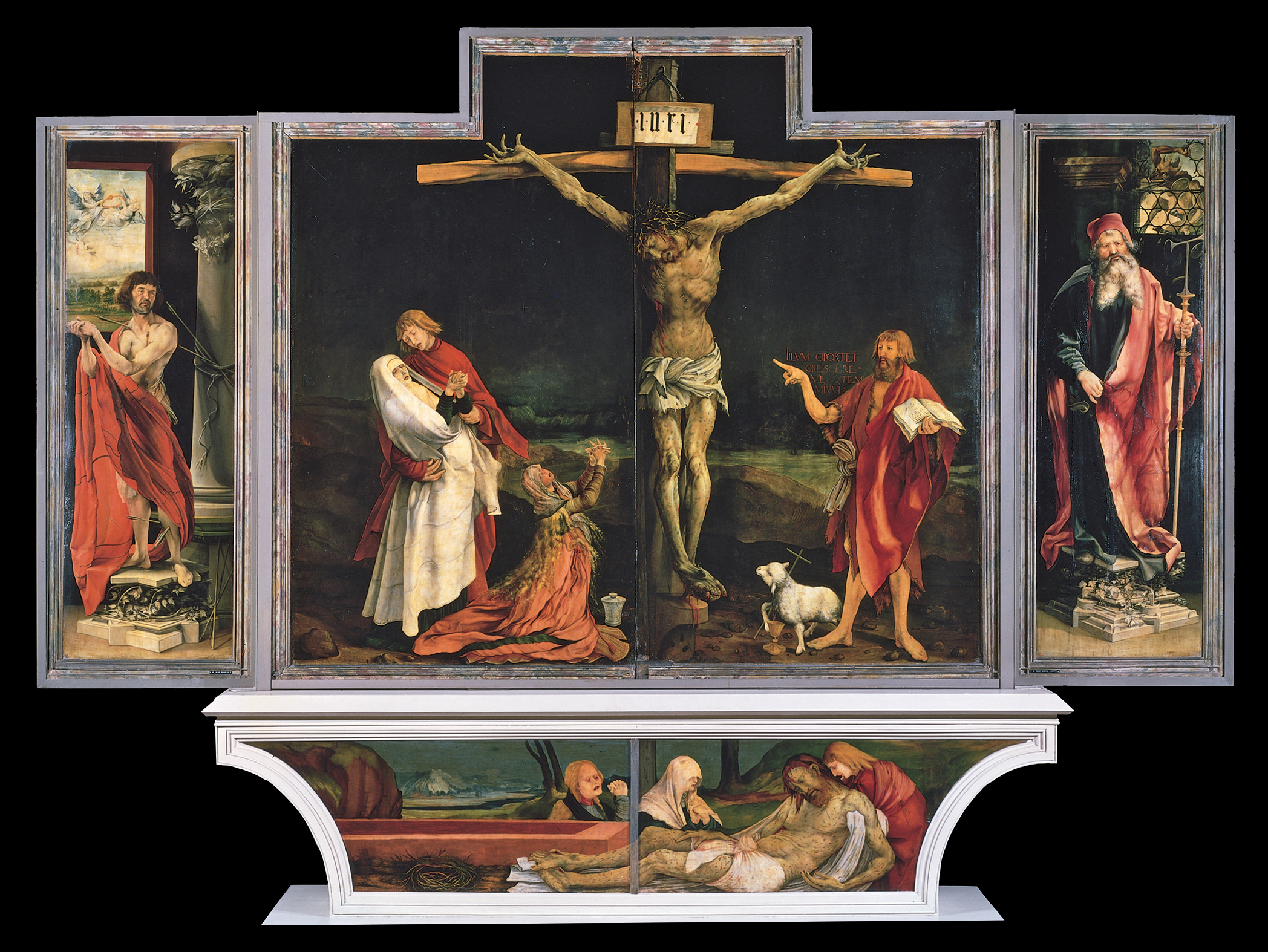
Matthias Grünewald, The Isenheim Altarpiece (c. 1516, Unterlinden Museum).

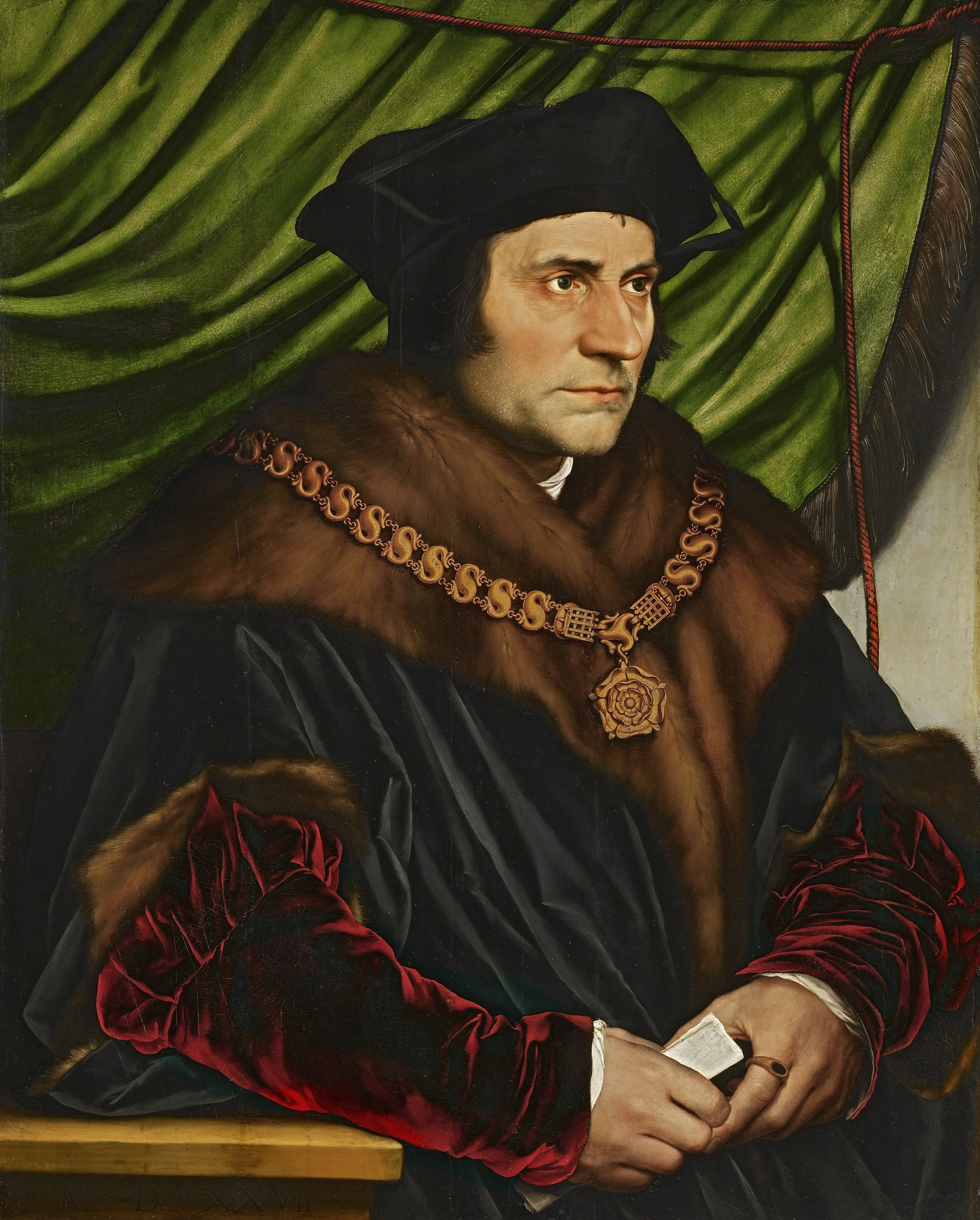
Hans Holbein the Younger, Portrait of Thomas More (1527, The Frick).

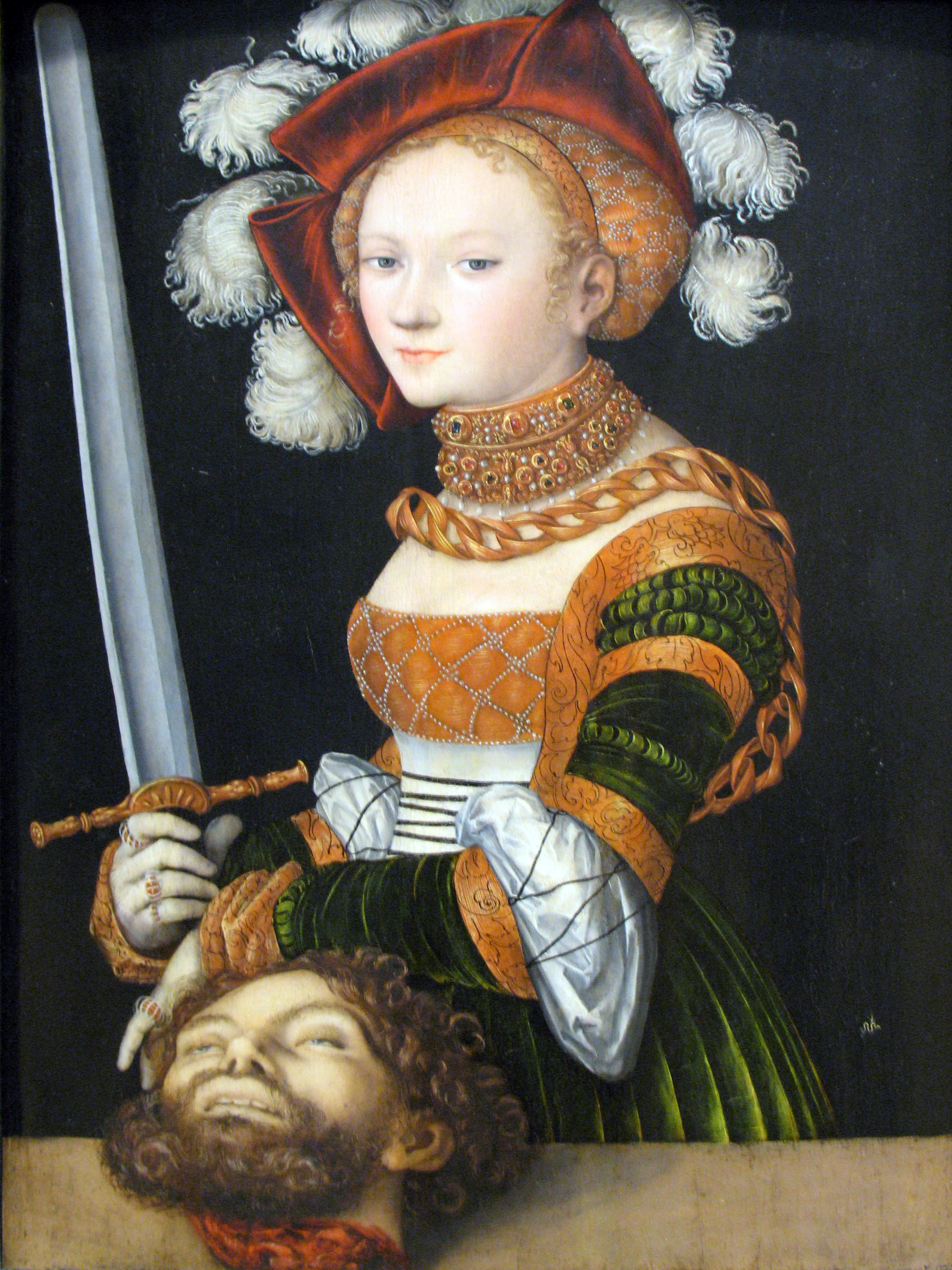
Lucas Cranach the Elder, Judith with the Head of Holofernes (c. 1530, Metropolitan Museum of Art).

Pieter Bruegel, The Harvesters (1565, Metropolitan Museum of Art).

Hans Holbein the Younger, The Ambassadors (1533, National Gallery).

Flemish, Dutch, and German painters of the Northern High Renaissance incorporating Italian art include engraver and watercolorist the Master of the Housebook, polymath Albrecht Dürer (1471–1528), Matthias Grünewald (c. 1470–1528), Hans Holbein the Younger (c. 1497–1543), Martin Schaffner (c. 1478–c. 1548) and Joos van Cleve (c. 1490–1540). The Danube School included Lucas Cranach the Elder (c. 1472–1553), Albrecht Altdorfer (c. 1480–1538), and Wolf Huber (c. 1485–1553).

The start of large genre paintings began with Peter Aertsen (1508–1575) and world landscape artist Pieter Bruegel (c. 1525–1569). Northern Renaissance artists who traveled to Rome and adopted the idealized Italian Renaissance painting such as Jan Gossaert (c. 1478–1532) became known as Romanists.

=== Baroque ===
Baroque painting was the dominant style of 17th-century Old Masters, characterized by great drama, rich, deep color, and chiaroscuro, evoking emotion and passion instead of the calm rationality prized during the Renaissance.

Its associated movement often identified with Absolutism and the Counter Reformation or Catholic Revival. However, the painting style spread throughout Western Europe, and was also popular in non-absolutist and Protestant states. Beginning with the Baroque era, artists received private commissions from a more educated and prosperous middle class.

==== Italian Baroque ====
Image Gallery (Click "Show" to view)
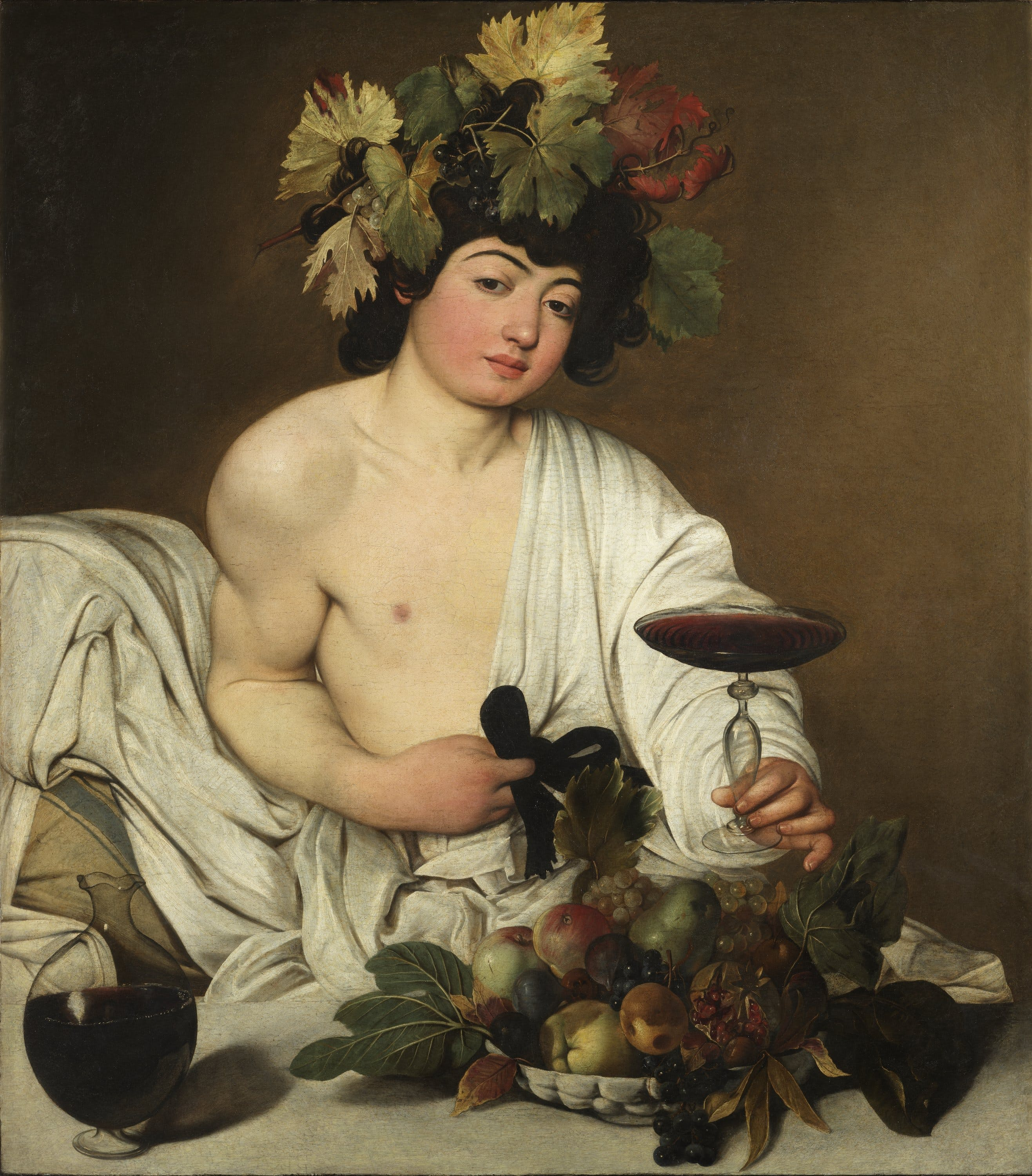
Caravaggio, Bacchus. (c. 1596, Uffizi Gallery)

Caravaggio, Death of the Virgin (c. 1606, Louvre).

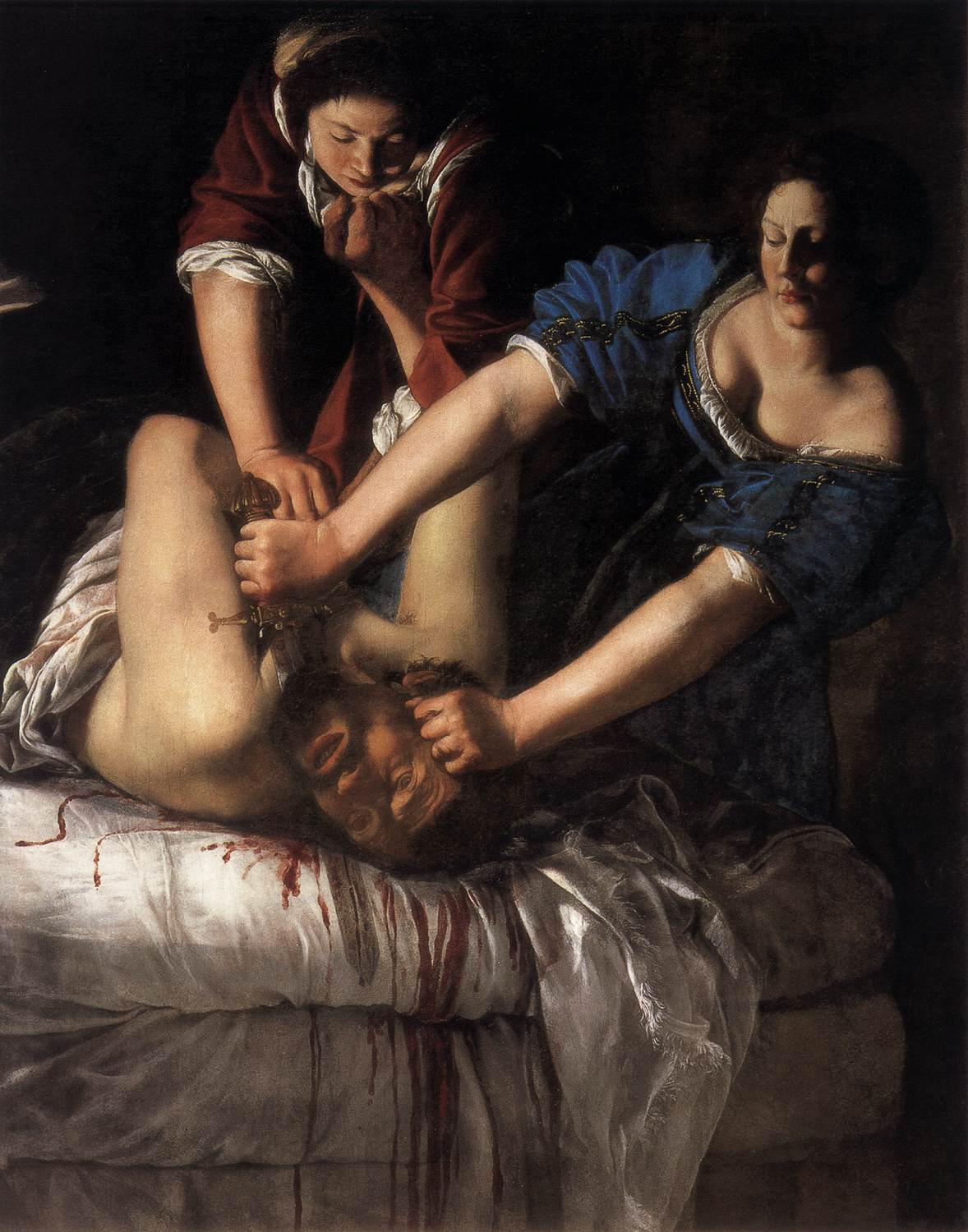
Artemisia Gentileschi, Judith Slaying Holofernes (1613, Museo di Capodimonte).

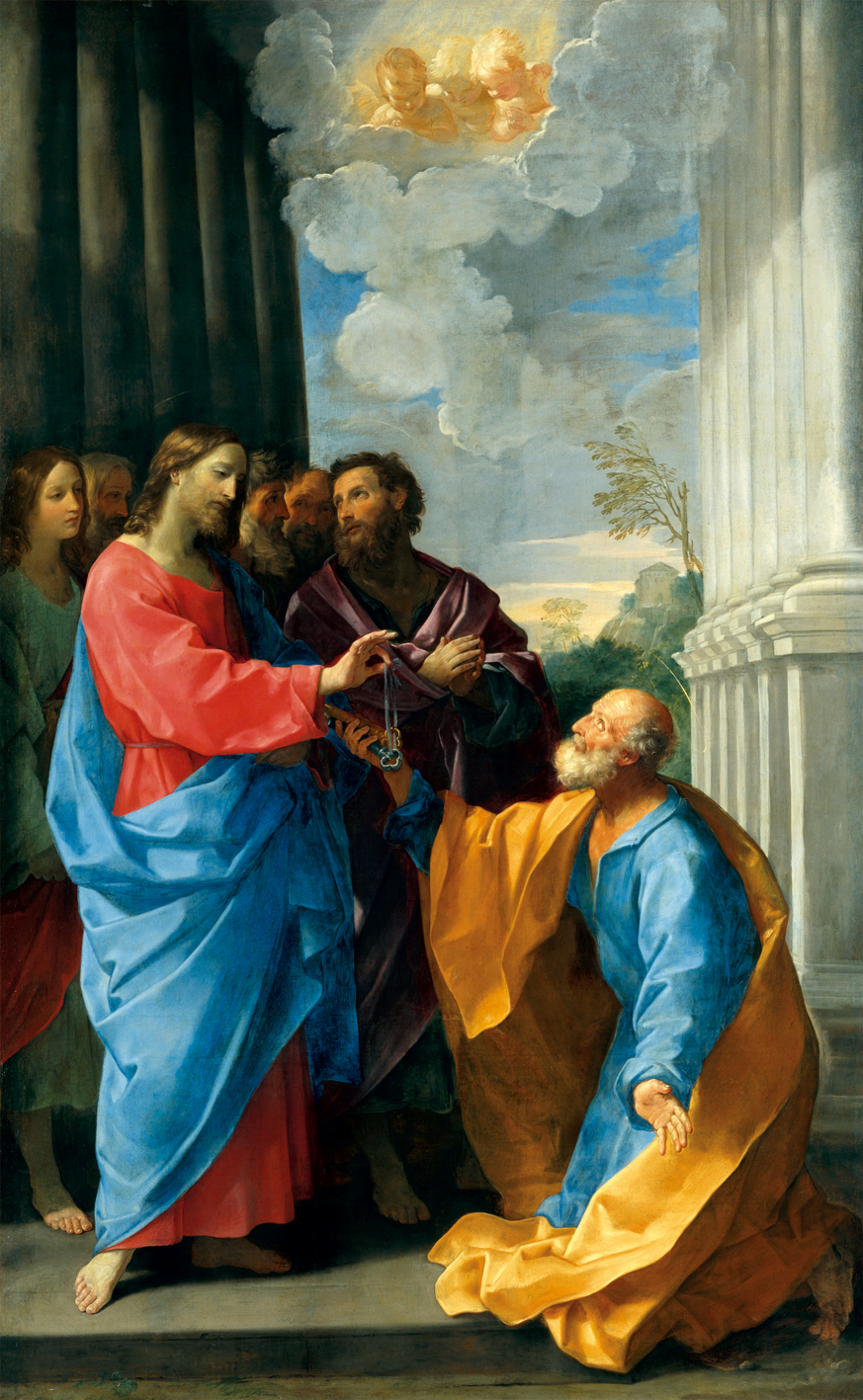
Guido Reni, Christ Giving the Keys to St. Peter (1625, Louvre).

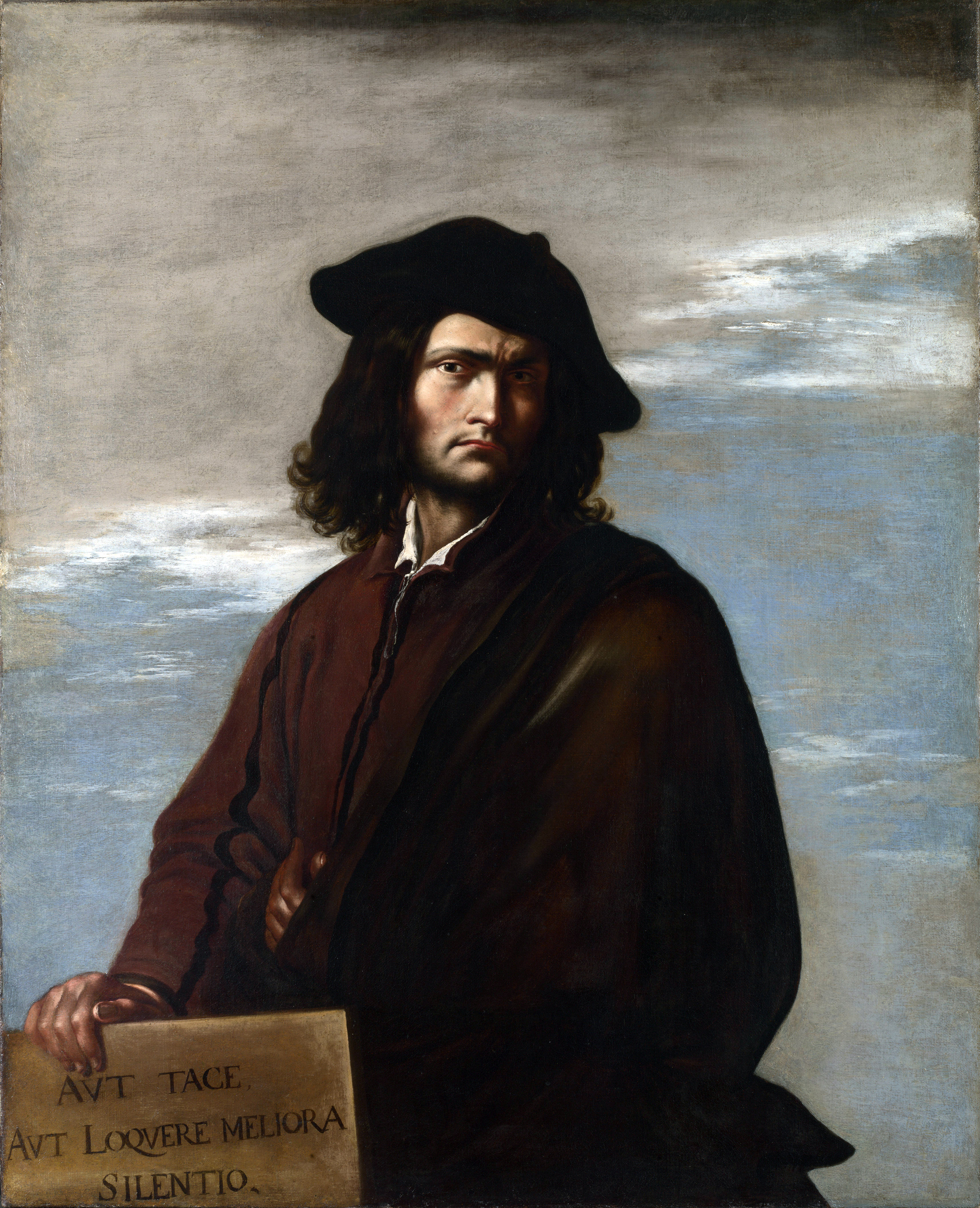
Salvator Rosa, self portrait, Philosophy (c. 1645, National Gallery)

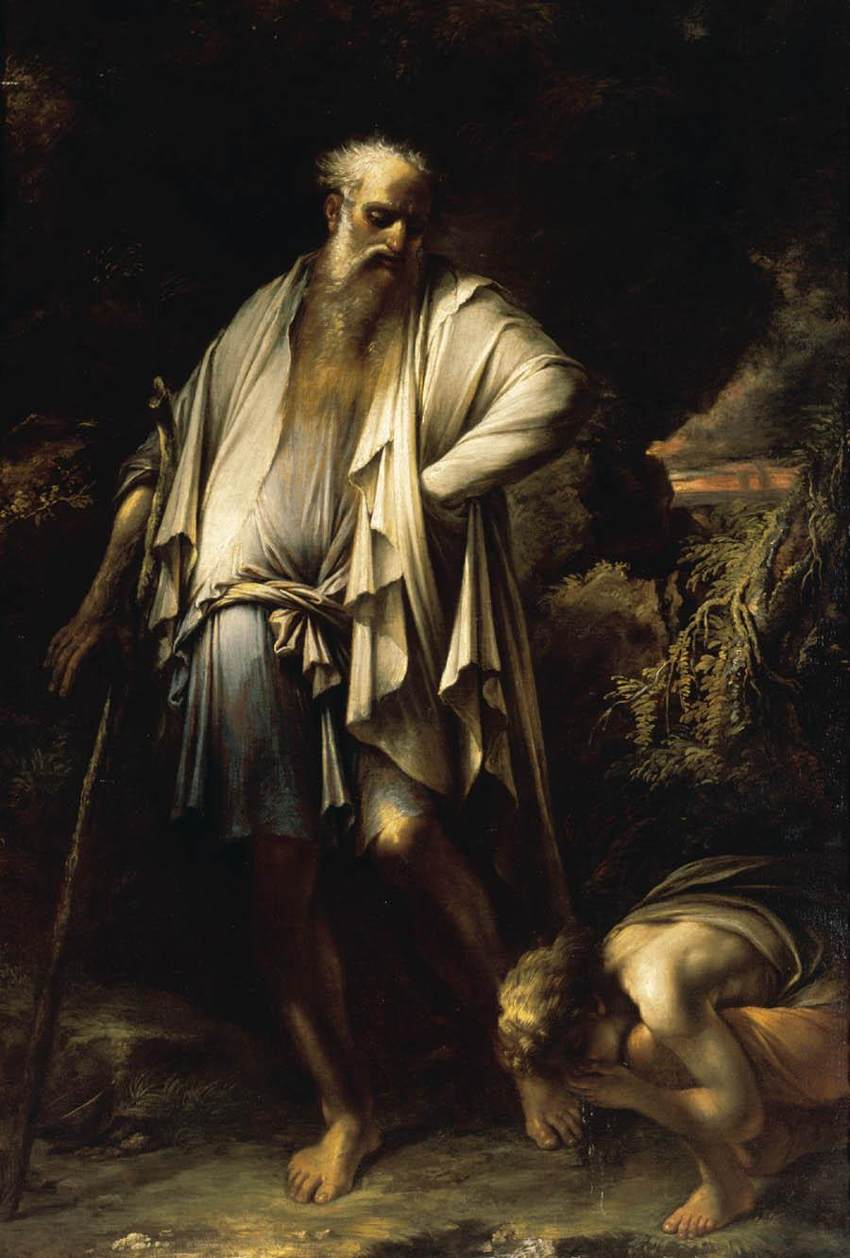
Salvator Rosa, Diogenes Casting Away his Cup (1650s, private collection).

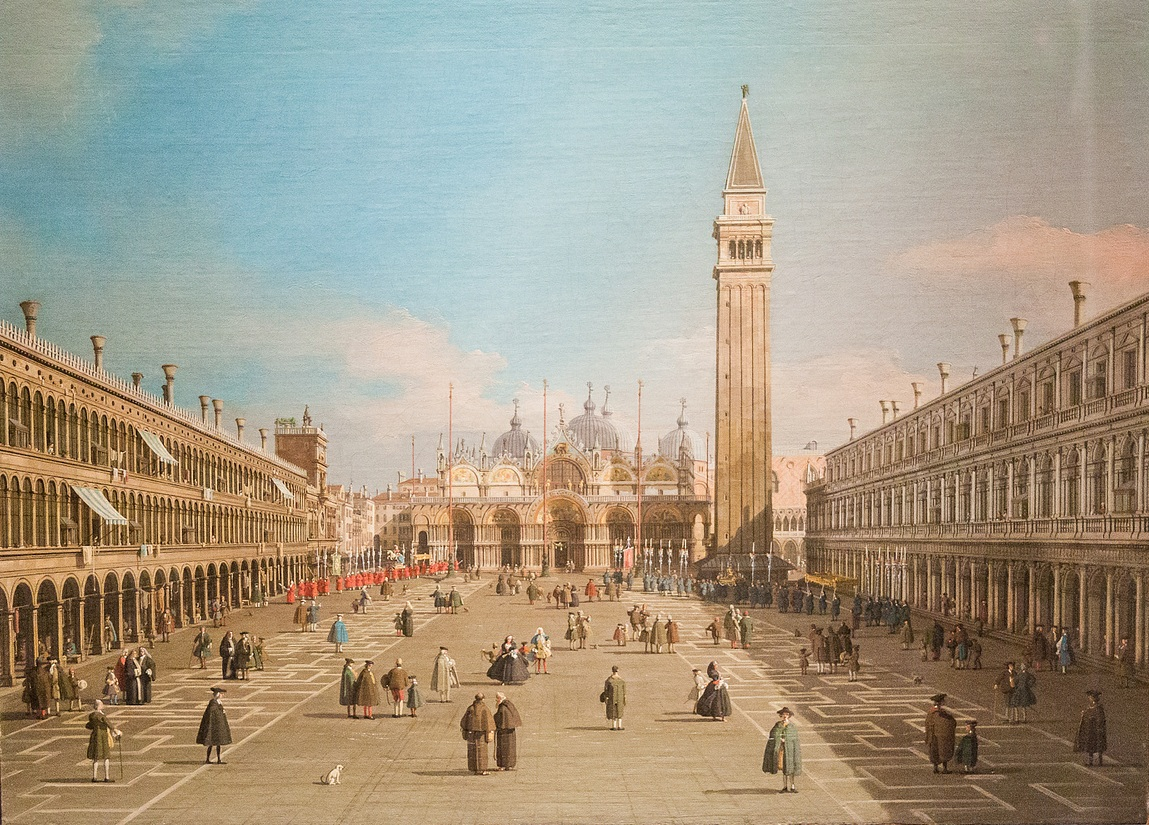
Canaletto, Piazza San Marco with the Basilica, Venice (1723, Ricardo Brennand Institute).

Giovanni Antonio Guardi, Alexander and Campaspe in Apelles' studio (c. 1745, private collection).

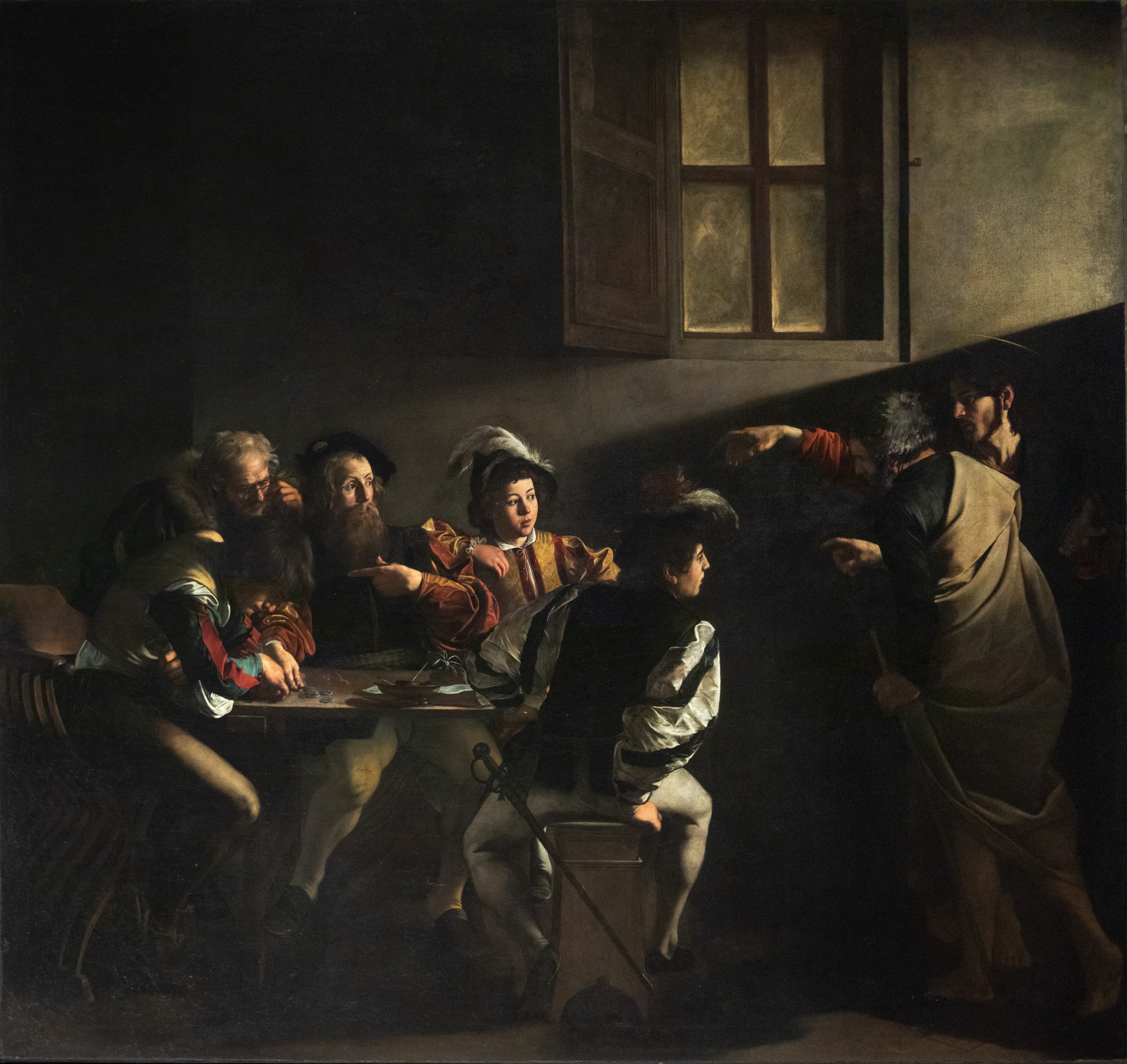
Caravaggio, The Calling of St. Matthew (1609) from San Luigi dei Francesi.

The earliest Baroque painters, of the late 16th century, include Federico Barocci (c. 1535–1612), the Bolognese Caracci brothers, Annibale (1560–1609) and Agostino (1557–1602), and Caravaggio (1571–1610).

Caravaggio was a master of chiaroscuro and tenebrism, displaying a humanist realism. His new style of painting shocked contemporaries like Giovanni Pietro Bellori (1613–1696), author of another Lives of the Artists (1672). Caravaggio-influenced Caravaggisti include religious and mythological painters, such as Artemisia Gentileschi (1593–1654), Guido Reni (1575–1642), Guercino (1591–1666), and Luca Giordano (1634–1705).

Church ceiling frescoes using quadratura by Pietro da Cortona (1596–1669) seemed to open to the sky. The landscapes and history paintings of Salvator Rosa (1615–1673), often set in dark and untamed nature, exerted considerable influence. Canaletto (1697–1768) painted cityscapes or vedute, of Venice, Rome, and London, and imaginary views (capricci). Orientalist Giovanni Antonio Guardi (1699–1760) was a founder of the Venetian Academy.

==== Flemish Baroque ====
Image Gallery (Click "Show" to view)
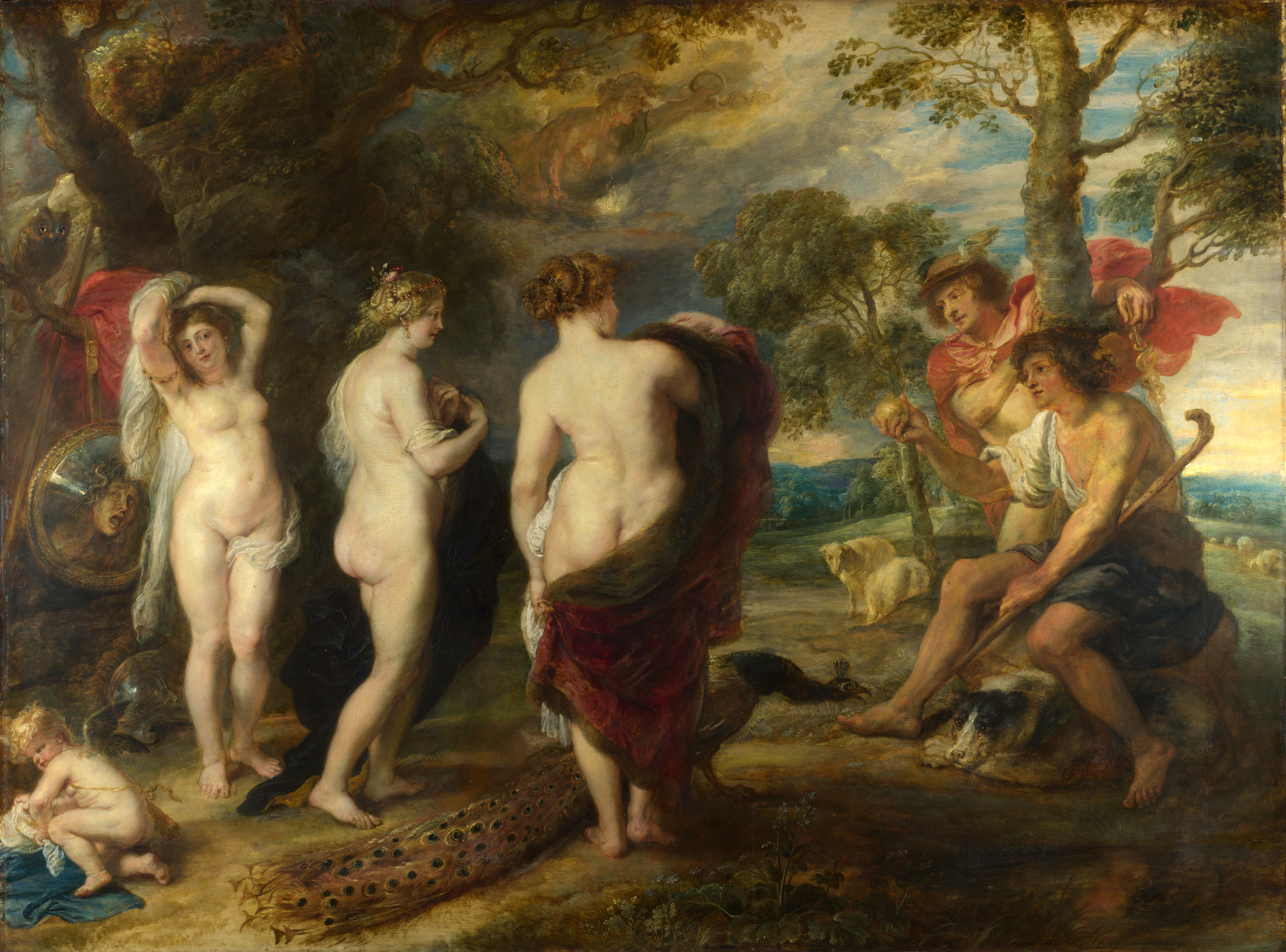
Peter Paul Rubens, Judgement of Paris (c. 1635, National Gallery).

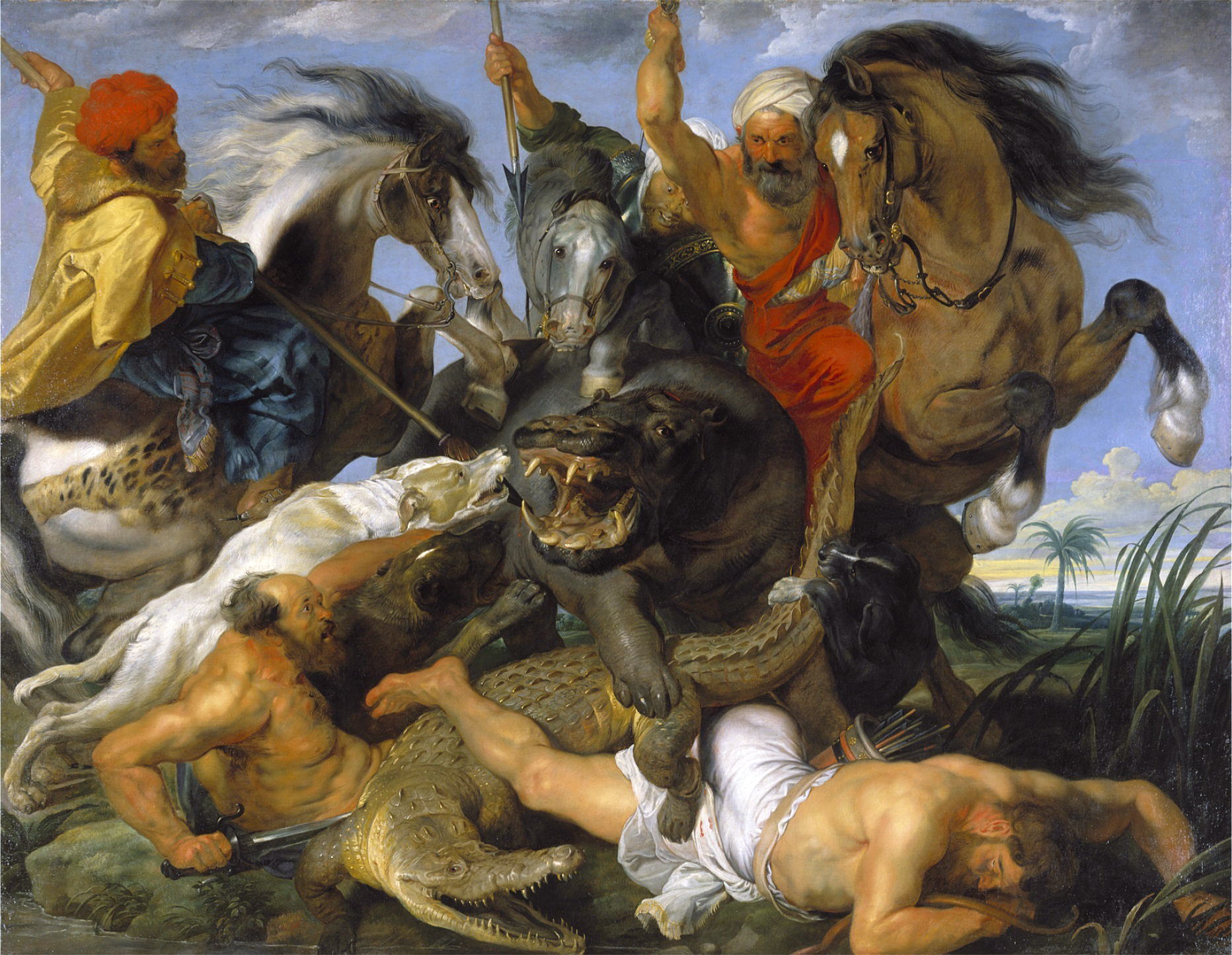
Peter Paul Rubens, Hippopotamus Hunt (c. 1616, Alte Pinakothek).

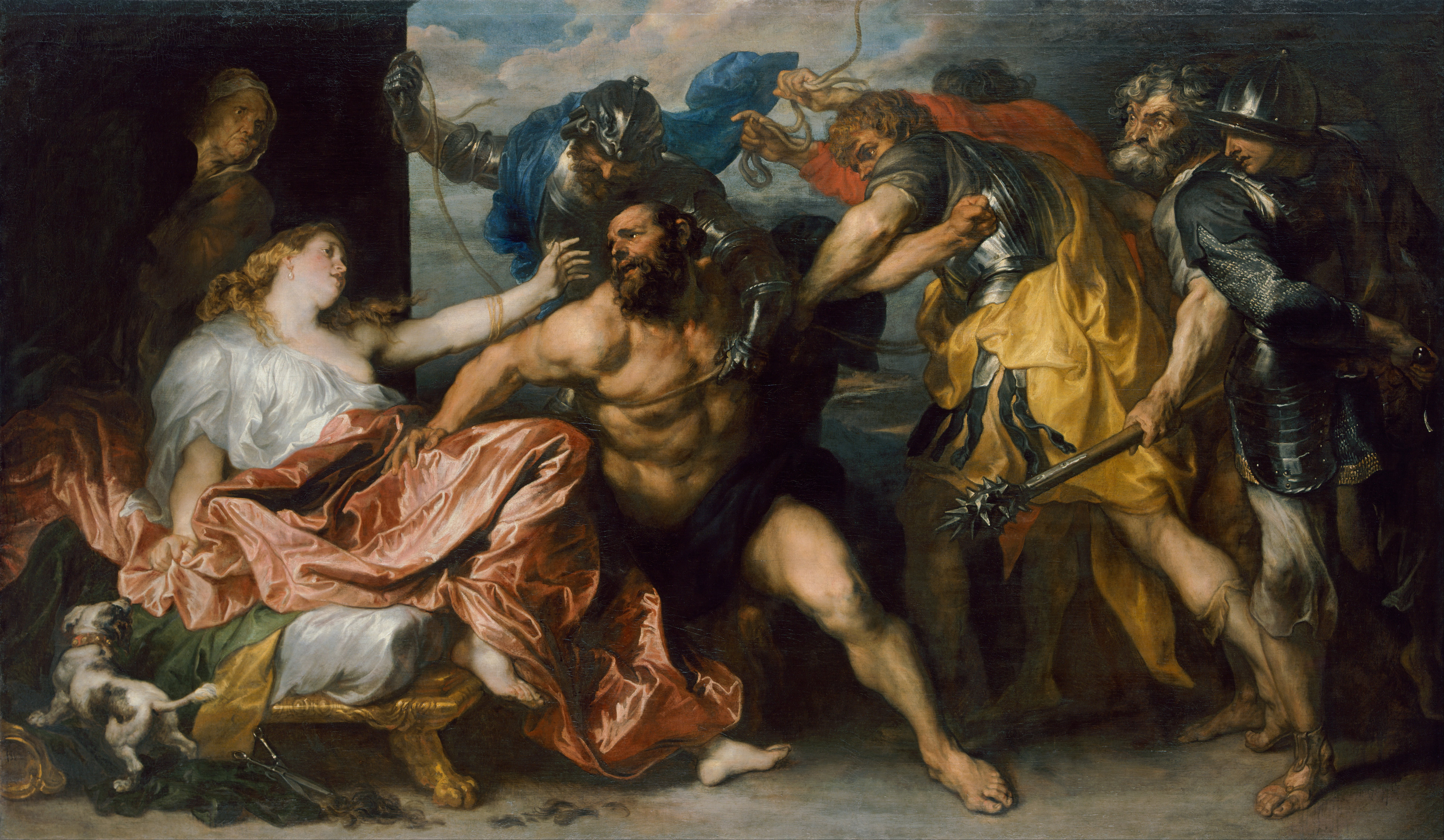
Anthony Van Dyck, Samson and Delilah (c. 1630, Kunsthistorisches Museum).

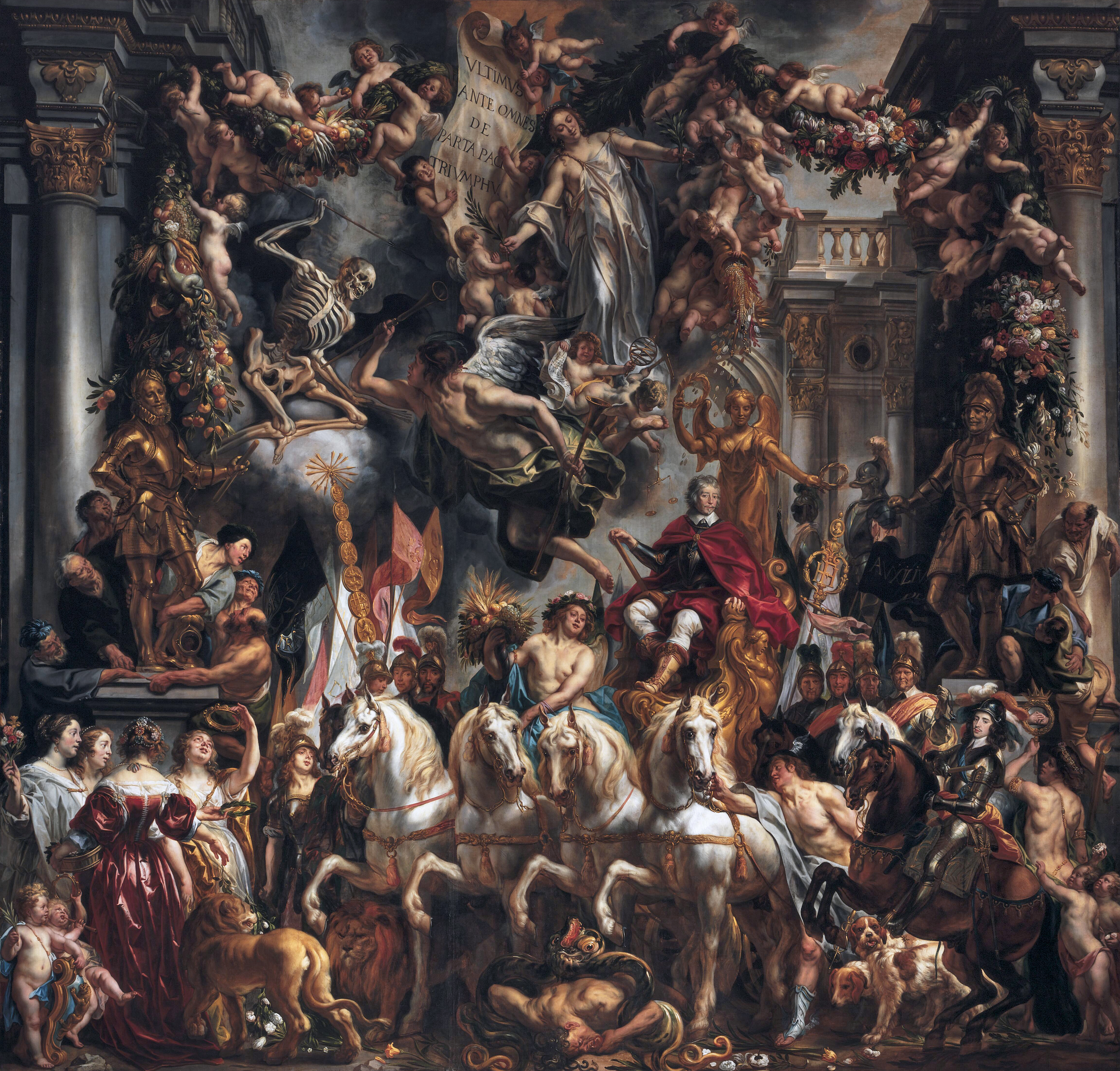
Jacob Jordaens, The Triumph of Frederick Henry, Prince of Orange (1652, Huis ten Bosch).

Barocci abandoned Mannerism, influencing Flemish Peter Paul Rubens (1577–1640), taught by Tobias Verhaecht (1561–1631), father of Willem van Haecht (1593–1637). Flemish Baroque painting of the Southern Netherlands was centered in Antwerp, and coincides with the Eighty Years' War (1568–1648), including the dramatic and crowded oil paintings of Rubens, Jan Brueghel the Elder (1568–1625), Anthony van Dyck (1599–1641), Jacob Jordaens (1593–1678), Cornelis Schut (1597–1655), and Theodoor van Thulden (1606–1669).

==== Dutch Baroque ====
Image Gallery (Click "Show" to view)
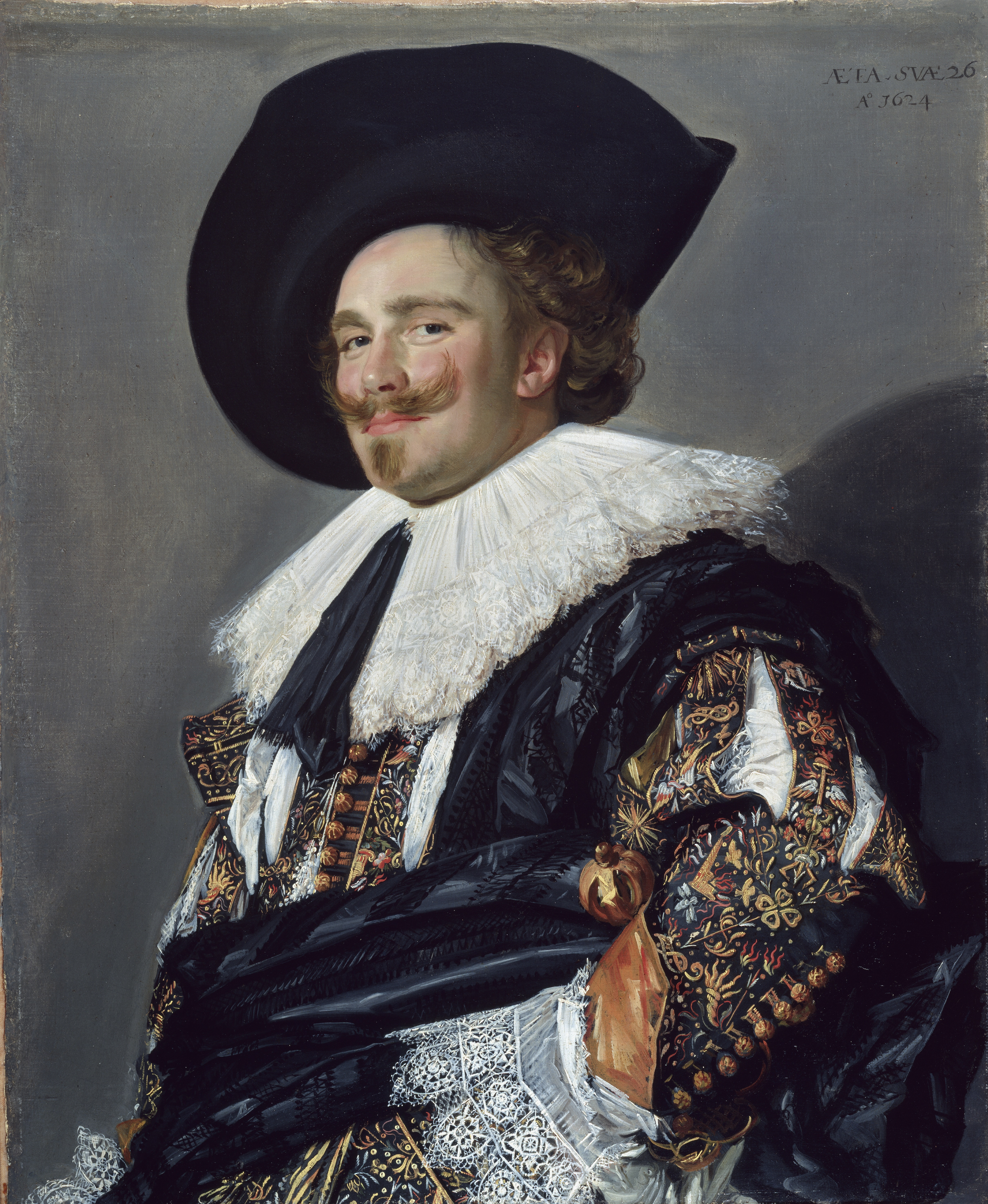
Frans Hals, Laughing Cavalier (1624, Wallace Collection).

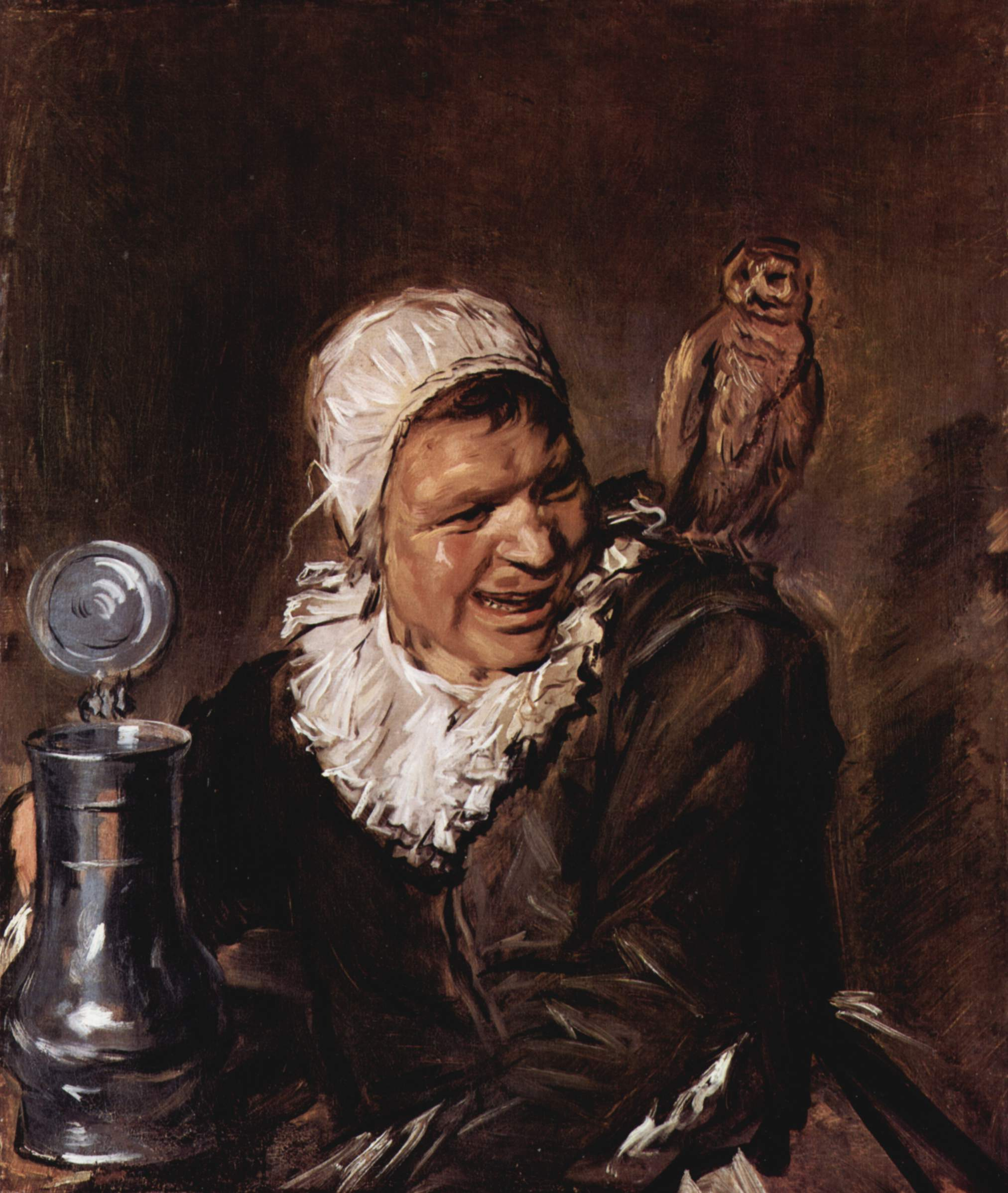
Frans Hals, Malle Babbe (c. 1640, Gemäldegalerie).

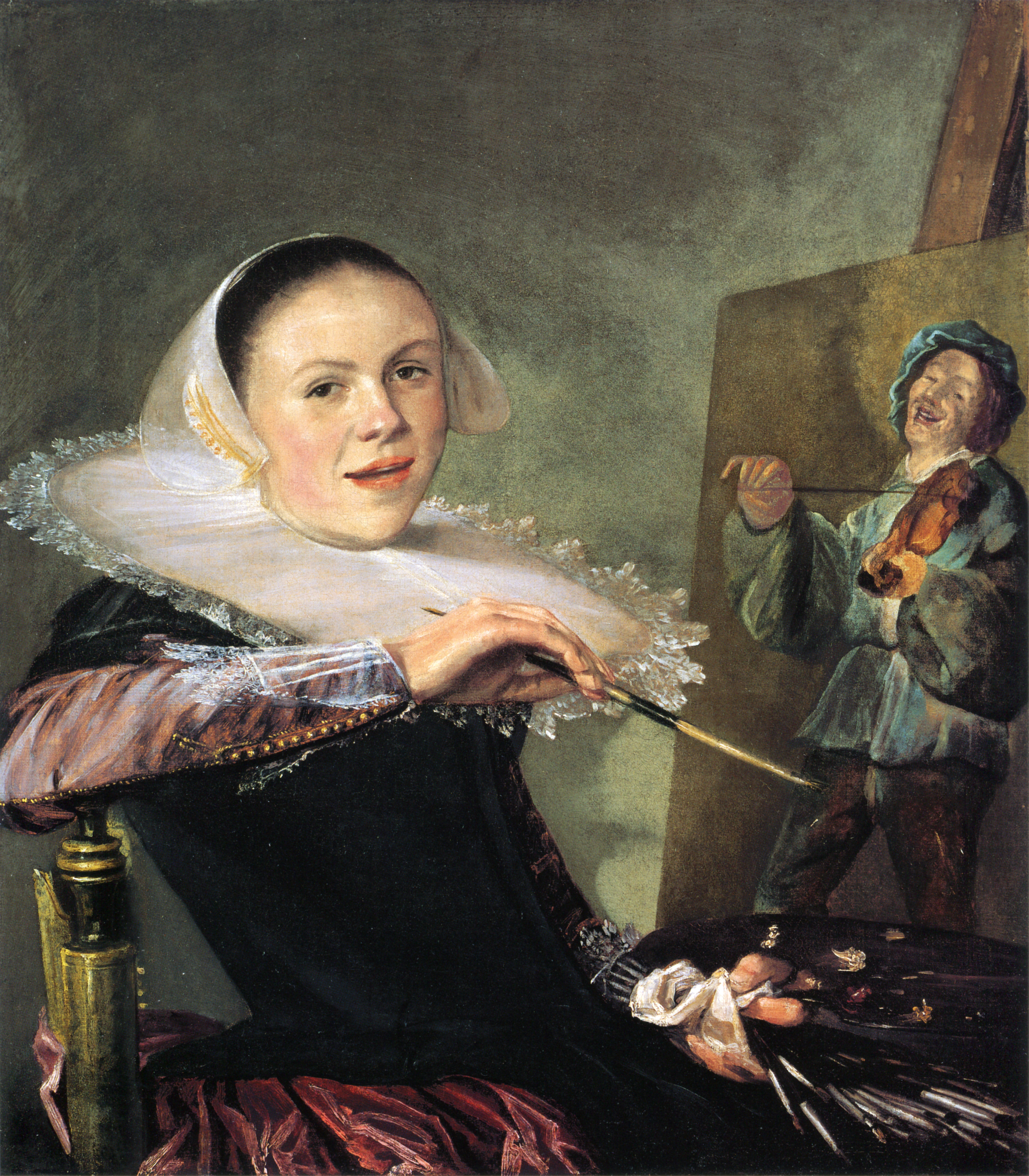
Judith Leyster, self portrait (c. 1630, National Gallery of Art)

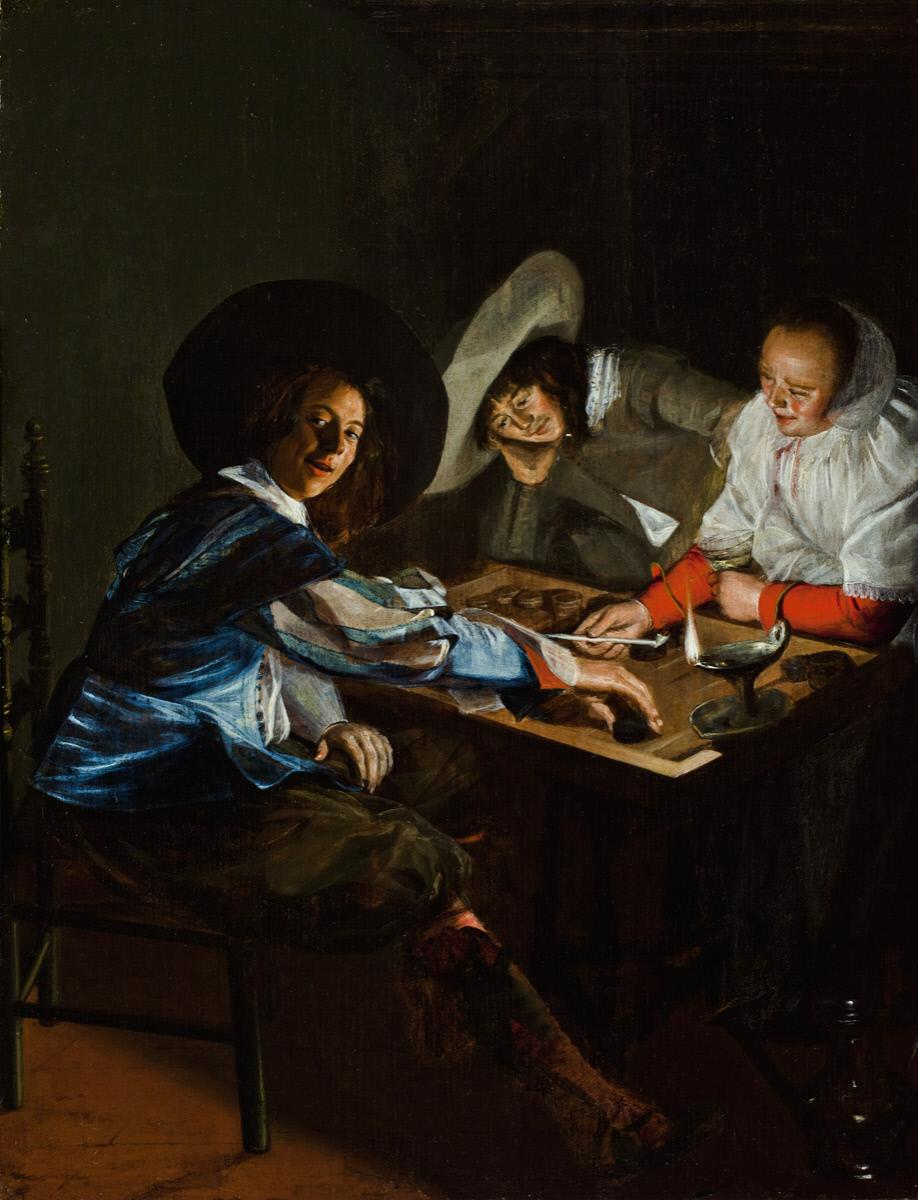
Judith Leyster, A Game of Tric-Trac (1630, Worcester Art Museum).

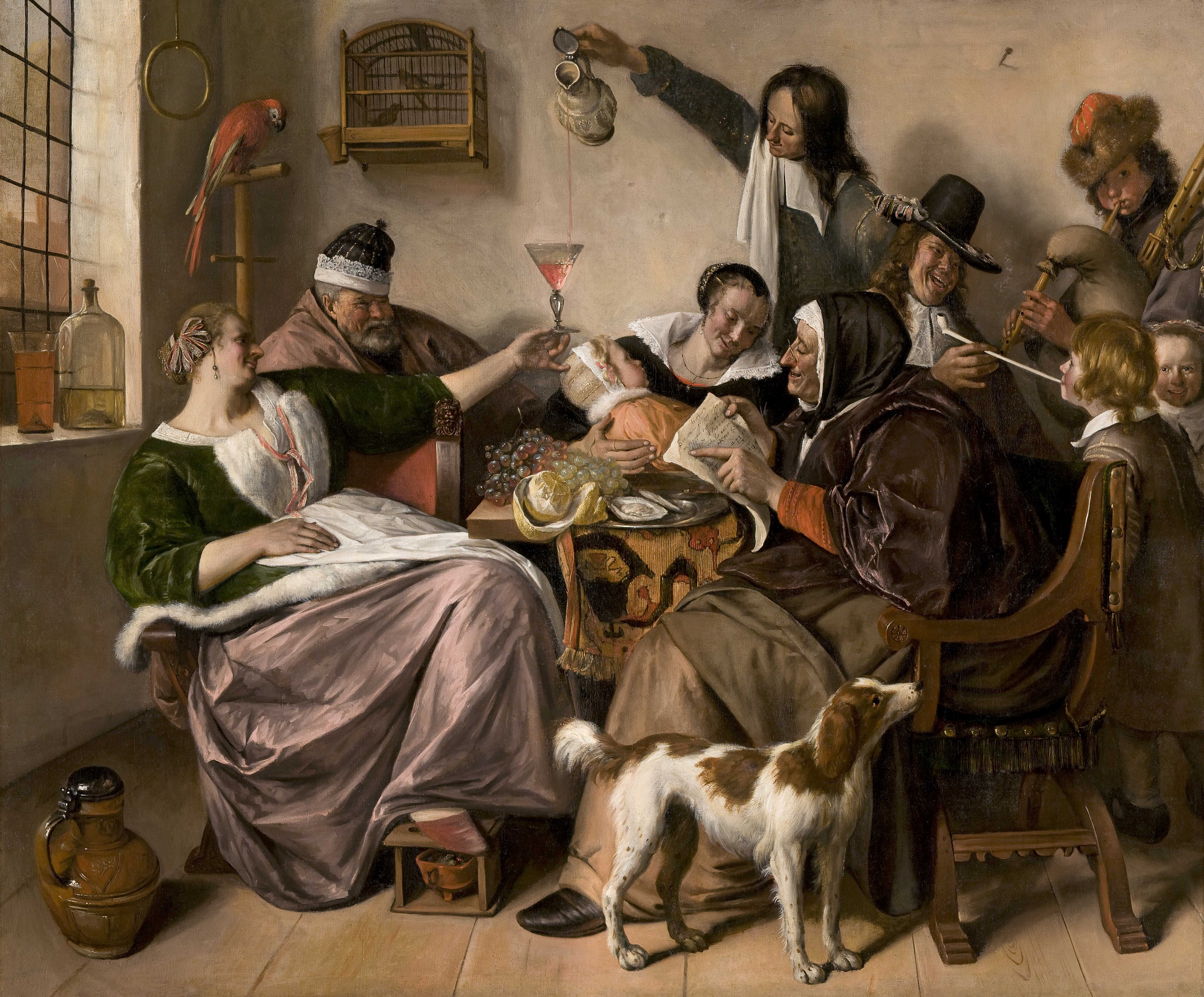
Jan Steen, ‘The way you hear it, is the way you sing it’ (c. 1665, Mauritshuis).

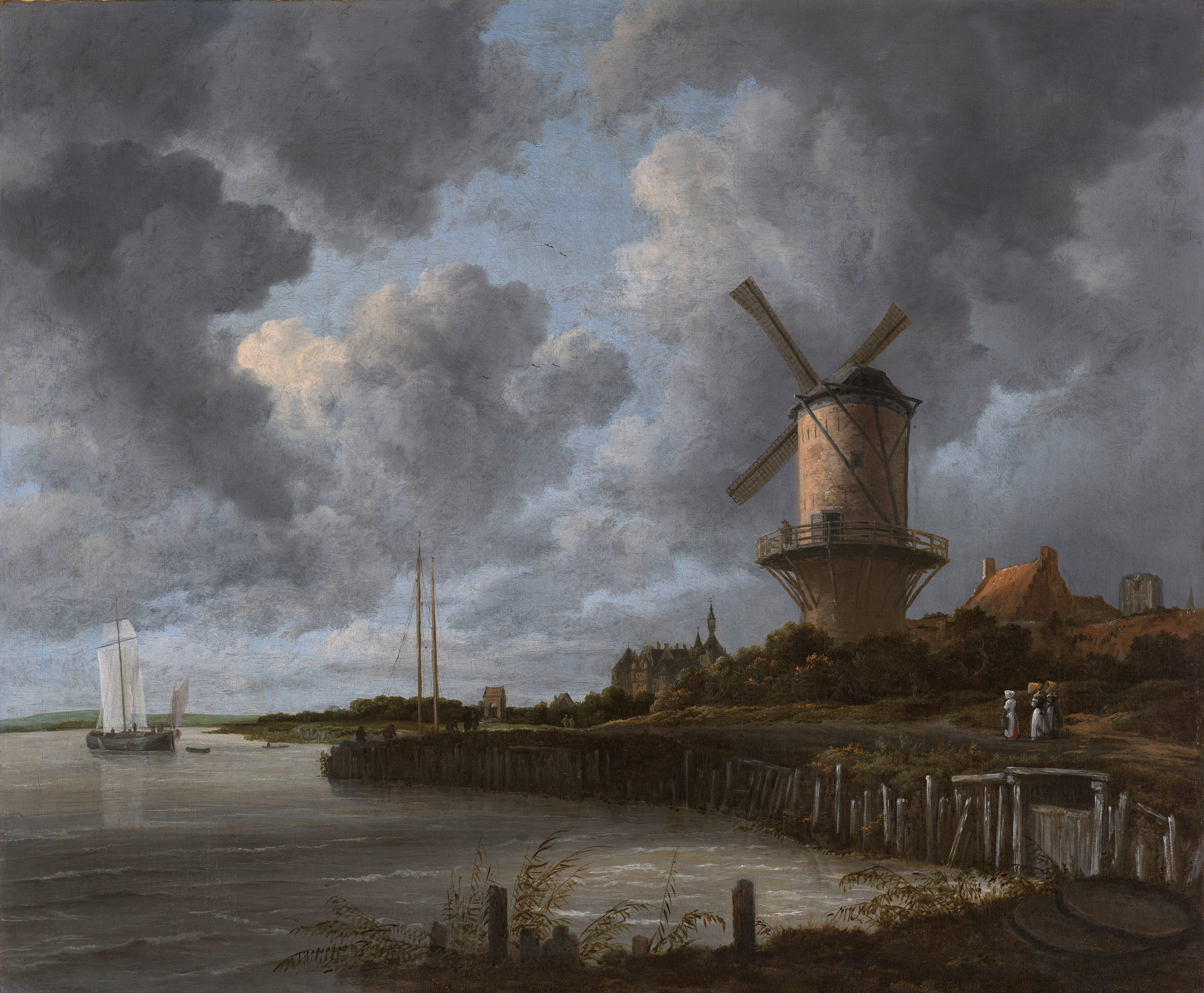
Jacob van Ruisdael The Windmill at Wijk bij Duurstede (c. 1670, Rijksmuseum).

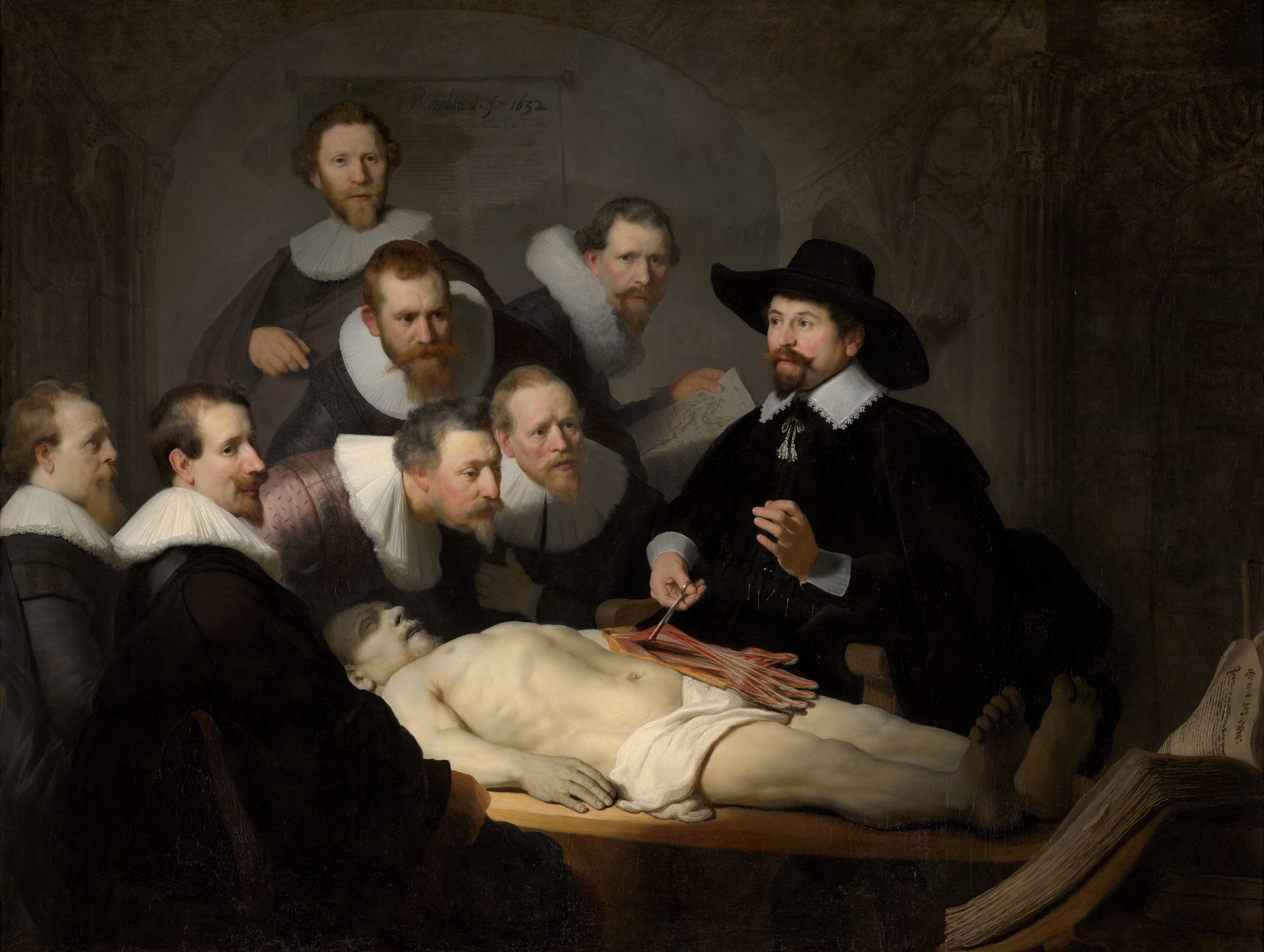
Rembrandt van Rijn, The Anatomy Lesson of Dr. Nicolaes Tulp (1632, Mauritshuis).

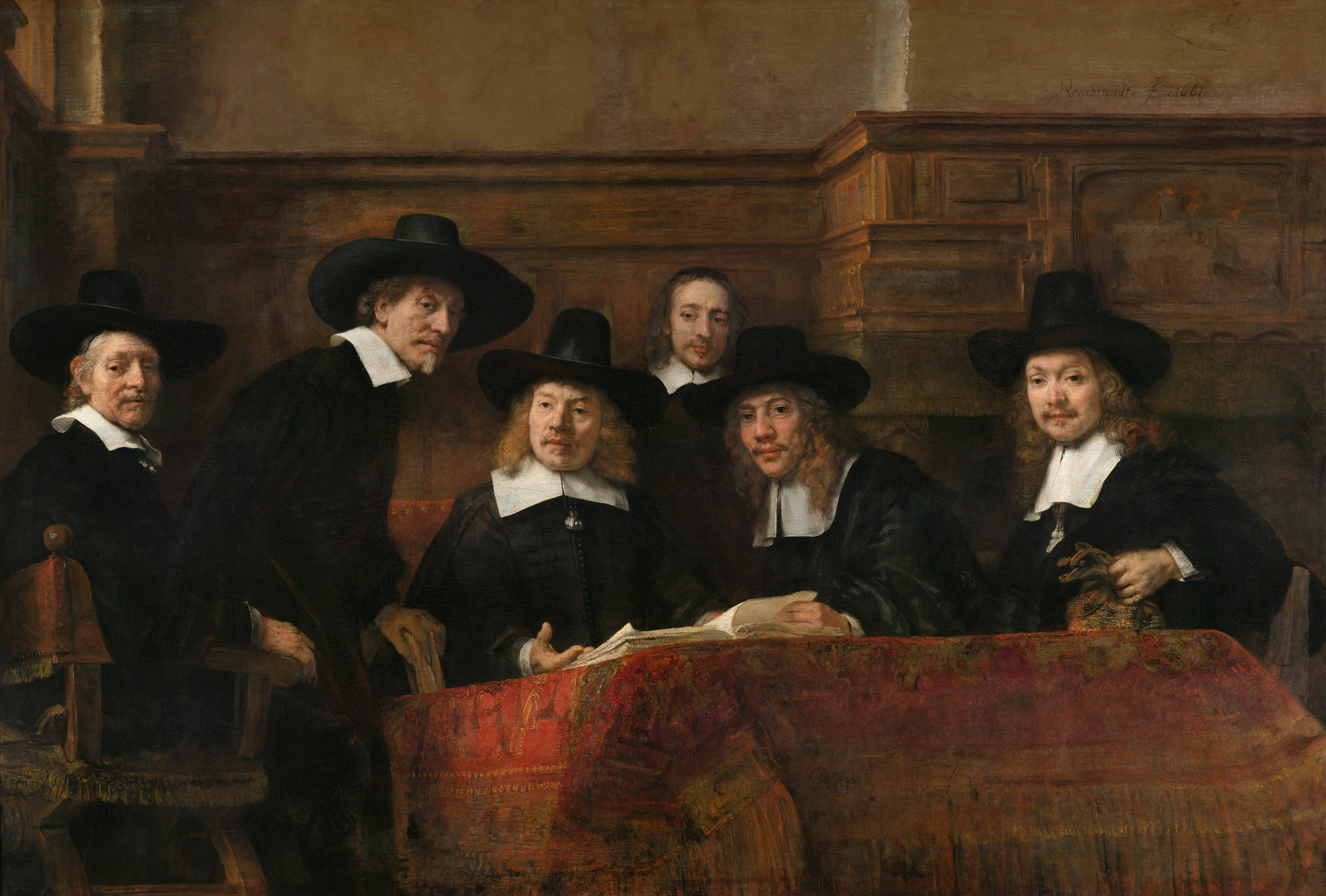
Rembrandt van Rijn, Syndics of the Drapers' Guild (1662, Rijksmuseum).

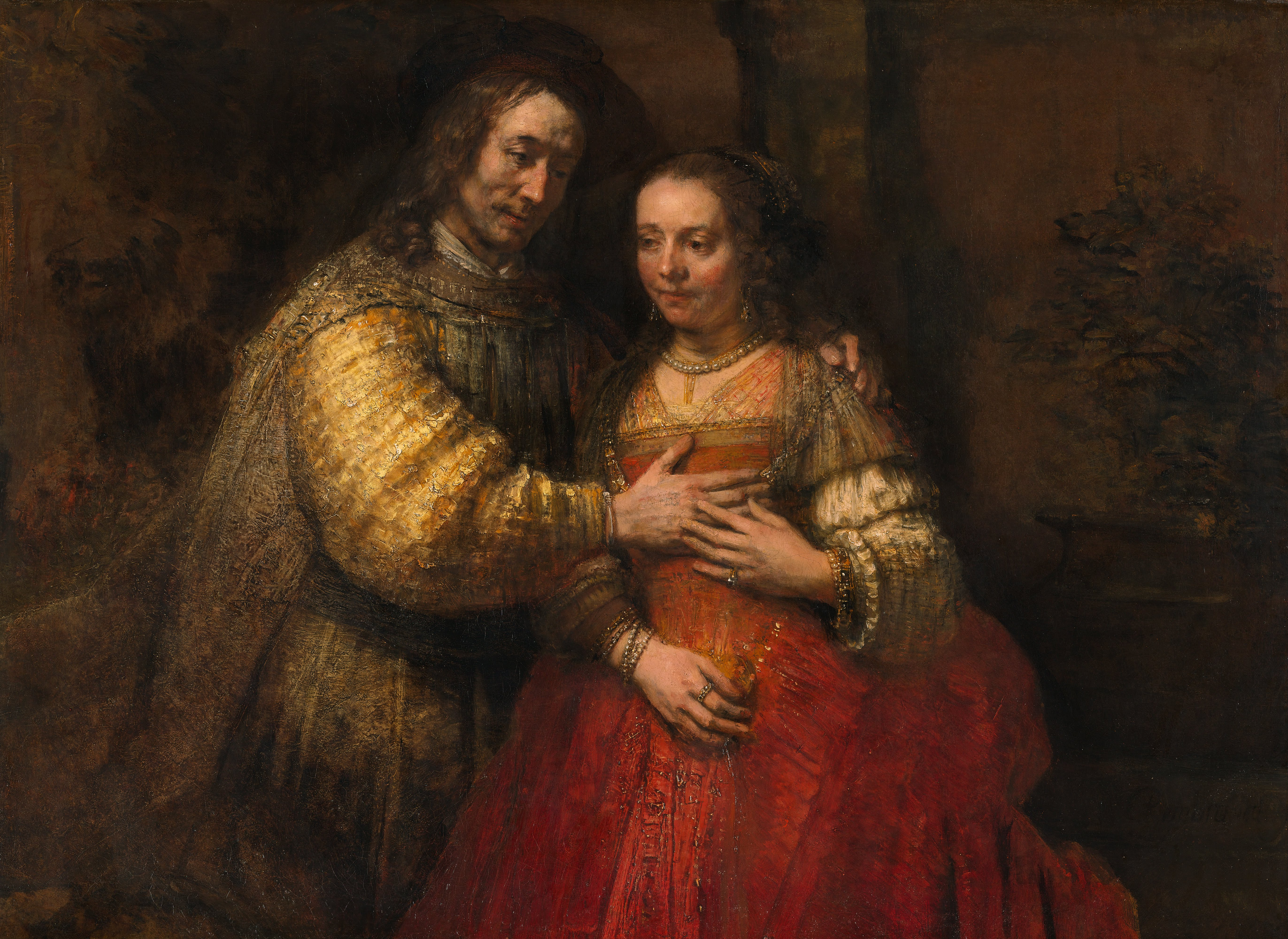
Rembrandt van Rijn, The Jewish Bride (c. 1669, Rijksmuseum).

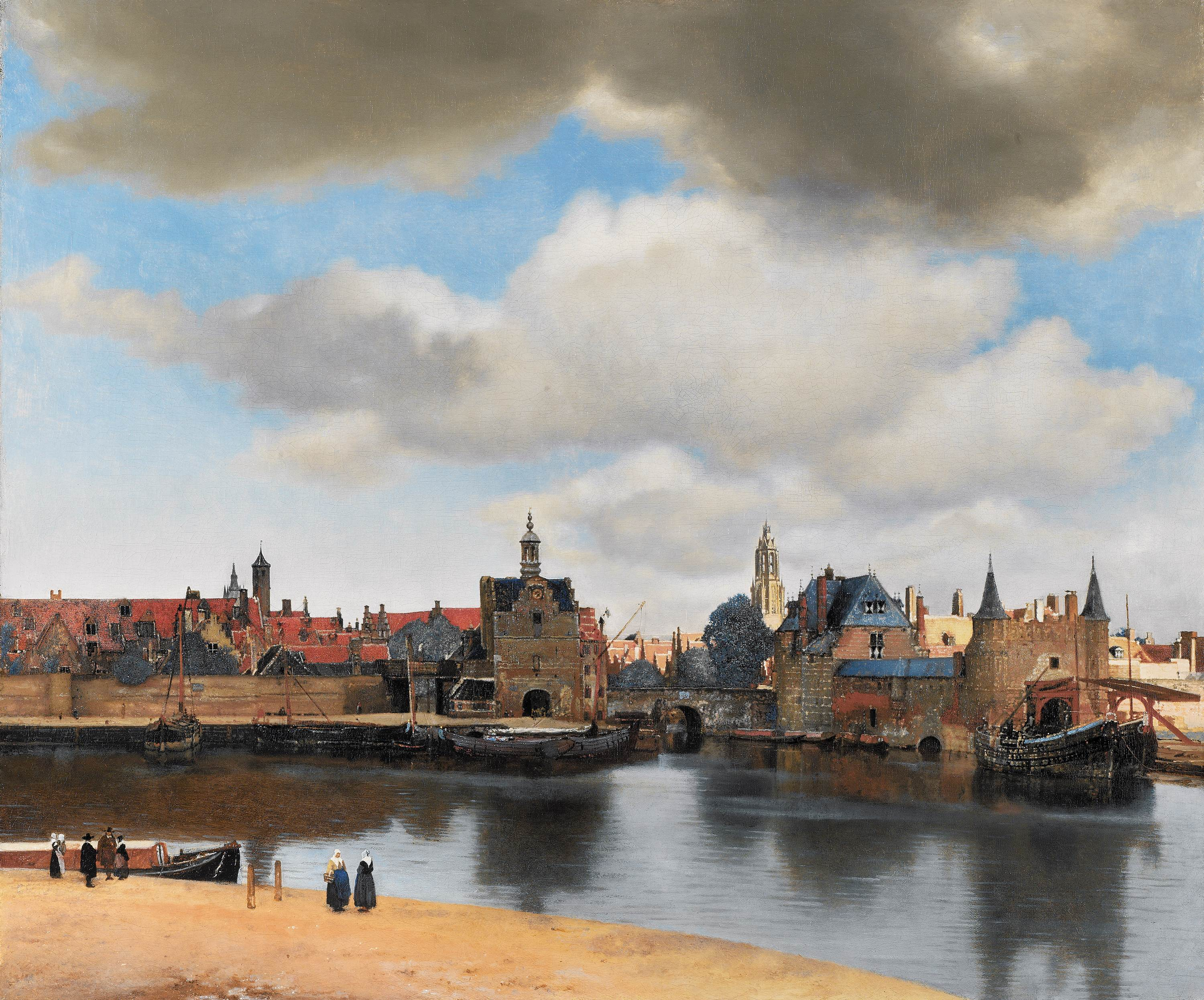
Johannes Vermeer, View of Delft (c. 1661, Mauritshuis).

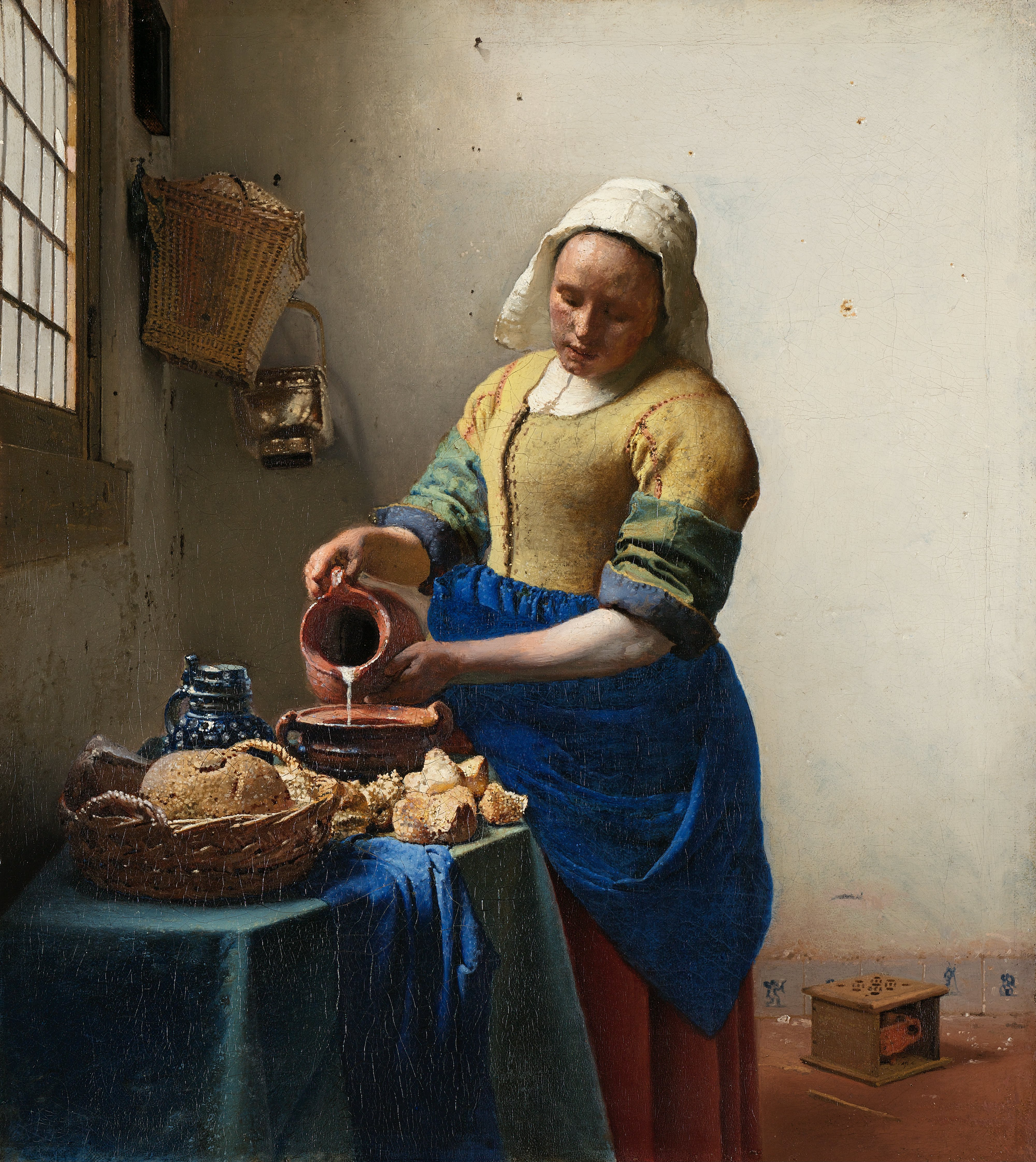
Johannes Vermeer, The Milkmaid (c. 1660, Rijksmuseum).

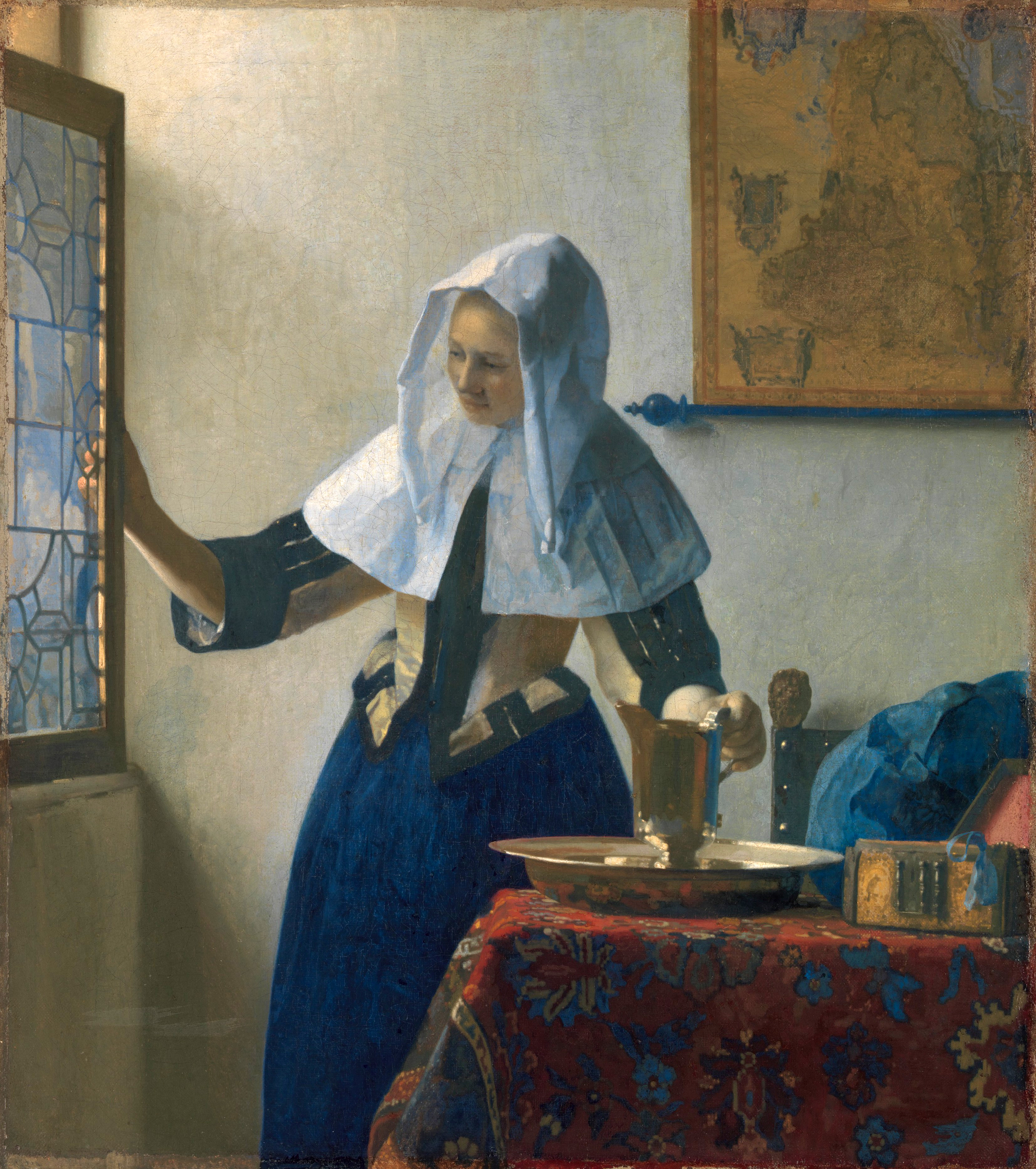
Johannes Vermeer, Woman with a Water Jug (c. 1660, Metropolitan Museum of Art)

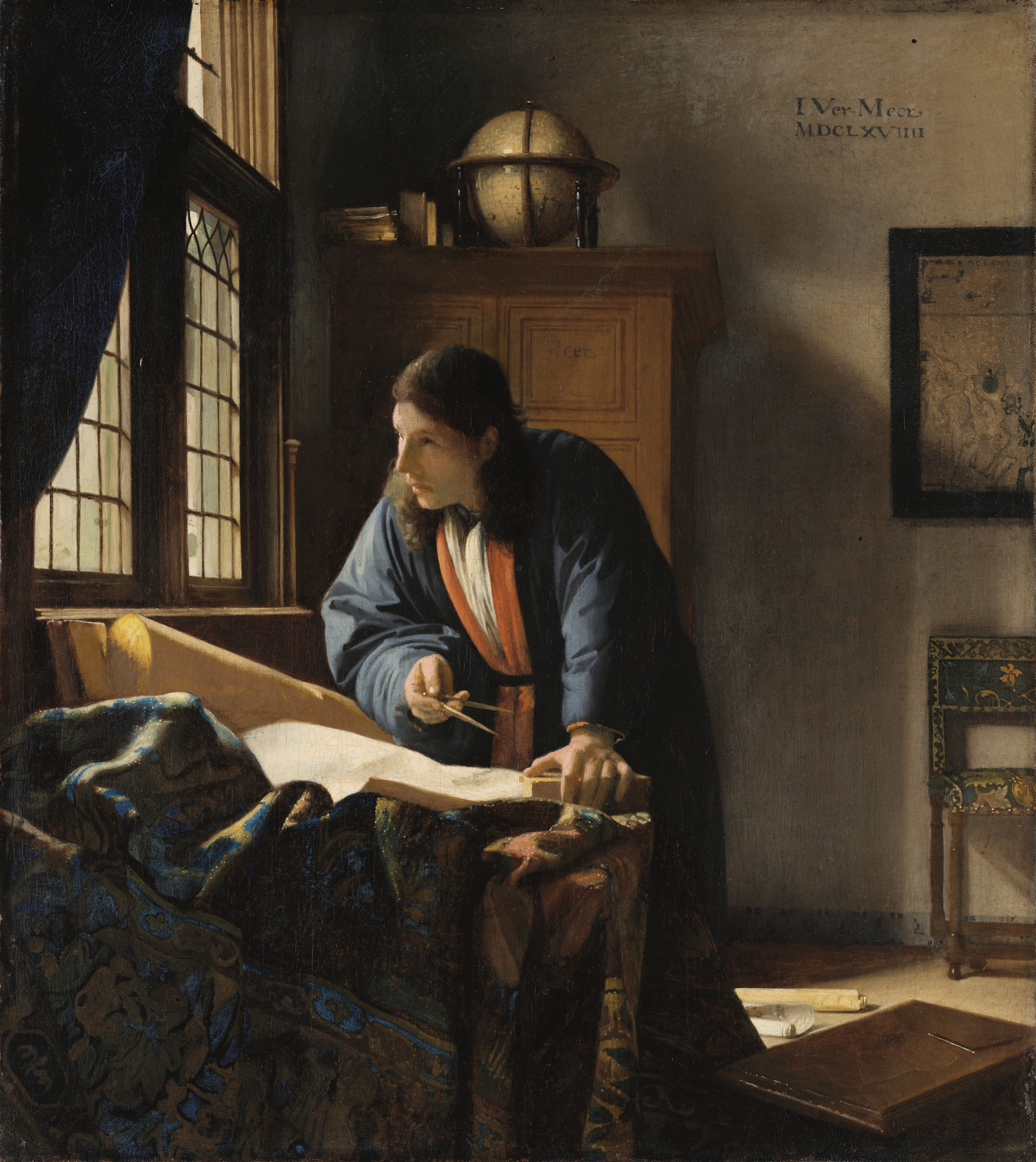
Johannes Vermeer, The Geographer (c. 1669, Städel).

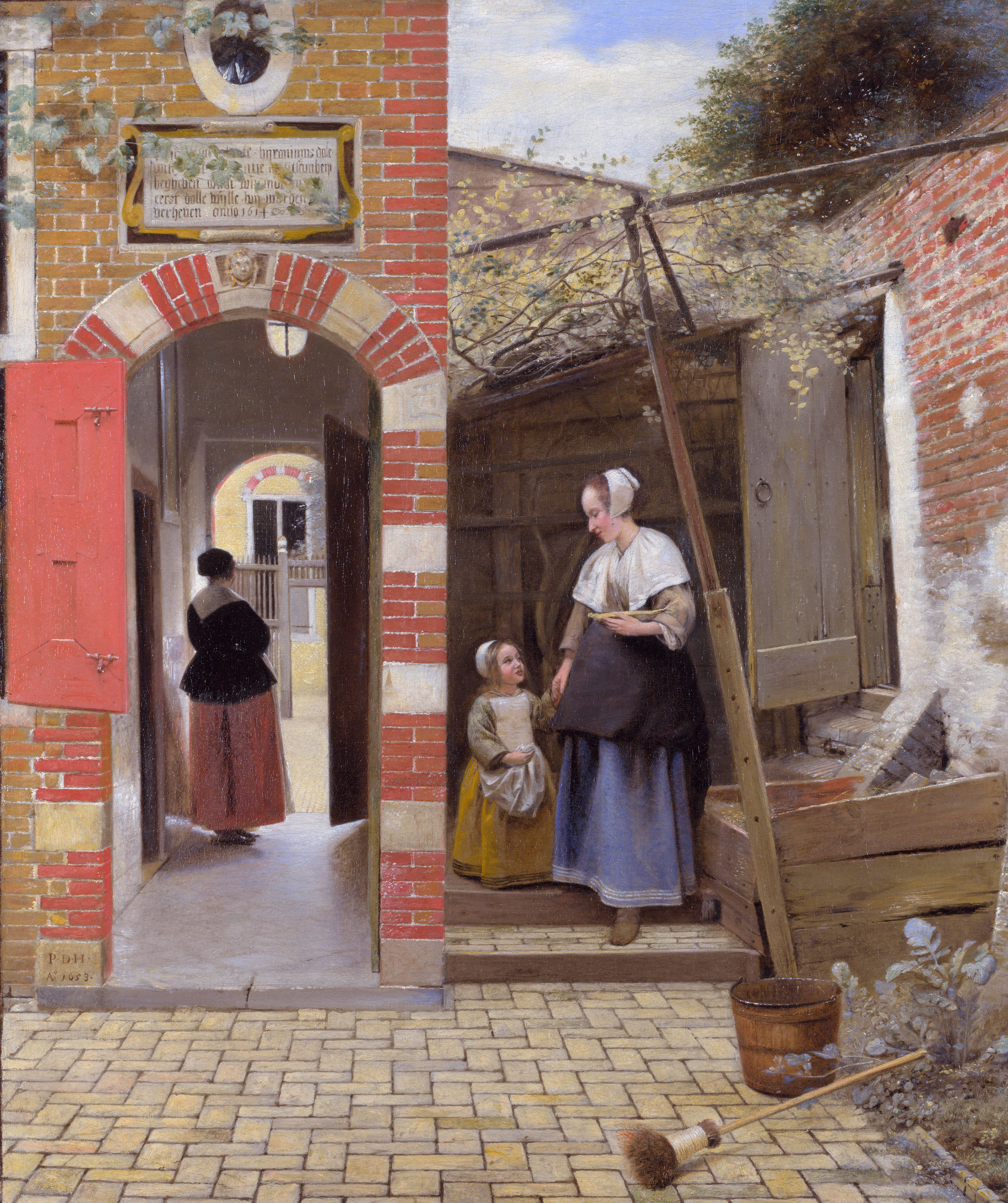
Pieter de Hooch, The Courtyard of a House in Delft (1658, National Gallery).

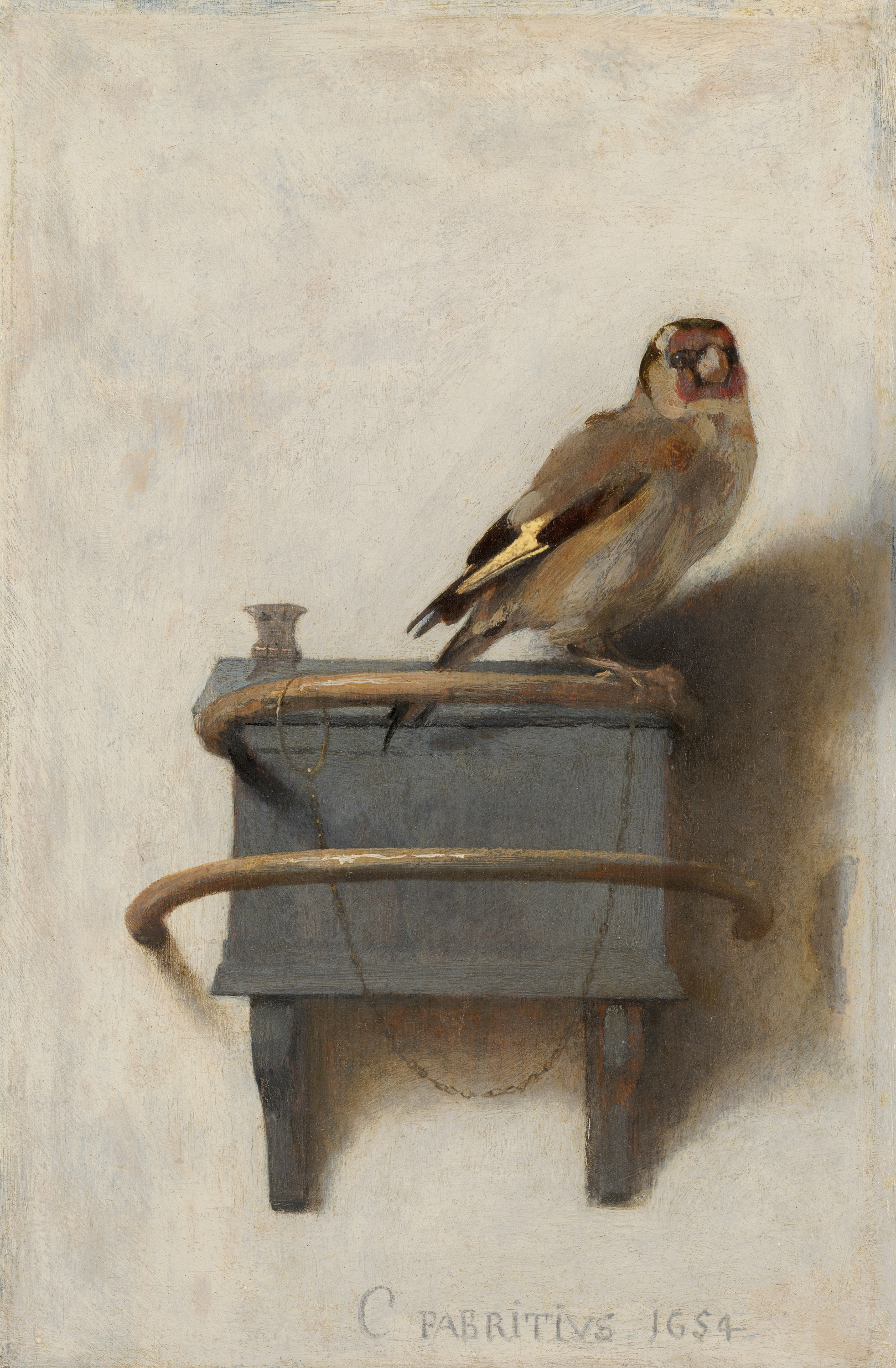
Carel Fabritius, The Goldfinch (1654, Mauritshuis).

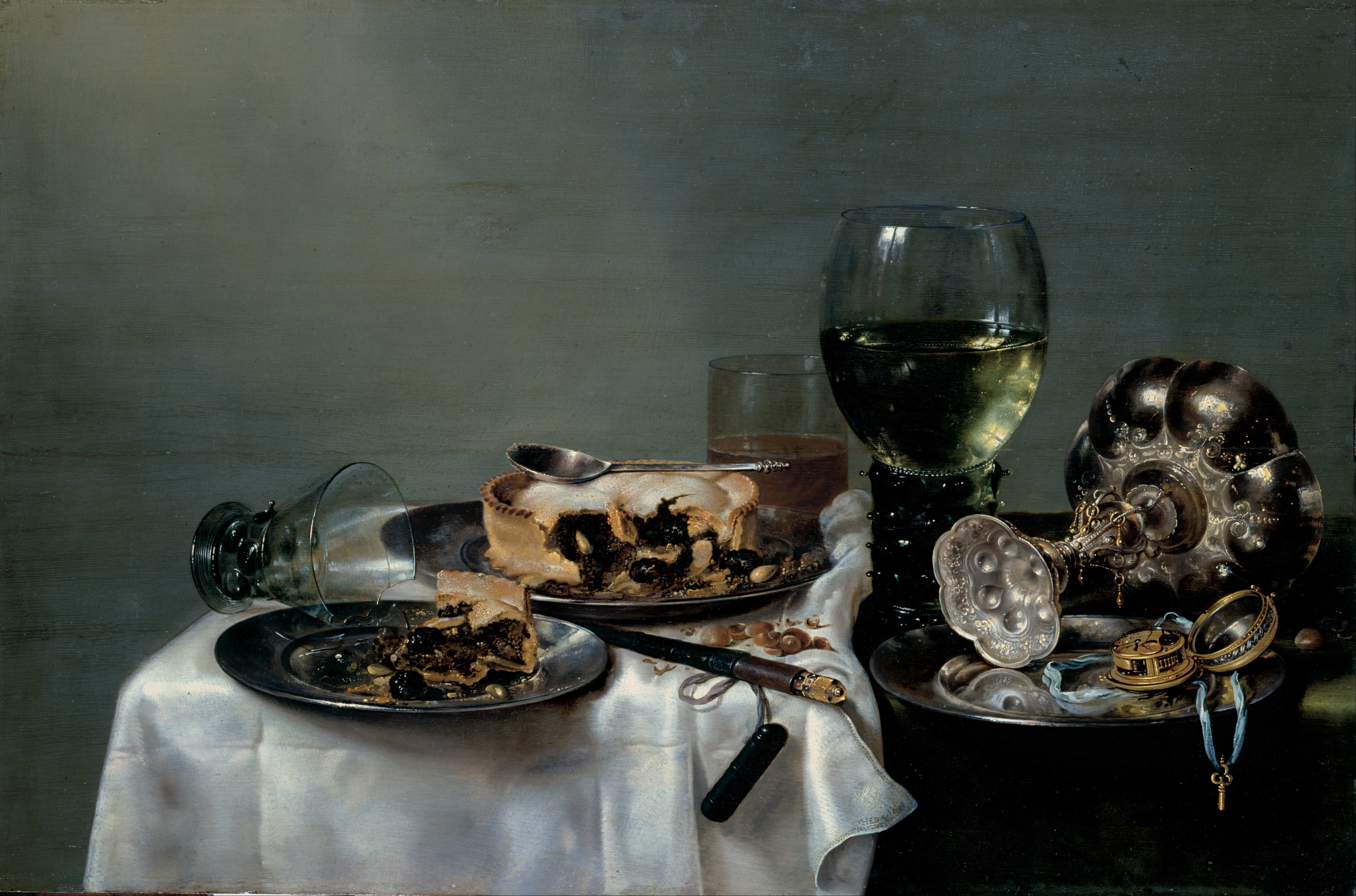
Willem Claesz. Heda, Breakfast Table with Blackberry Pie (1631, Gemäldegalerie Alte Meister).

Rembrandt van Rijn, The Night Watch (1642, Rijksmuseum).

The Dutch Republic's Baroque painting, known as Dutch Golden Age Painting, is more reserved, first found in Pieter Codde (1599–1678), Willem Cornelisz Duyster (1599–1635), and Jacob Duck (1600–1667). Easel paintings of everyday subjects were popular with middle-class collectors, and some notable repositories are Mauritshuis in The Hague and Rijksmuseum in Amsterdam.

Art and vision historian Heinrich Wölfflin (1864–1945) argued Rembrandt van Rijn (1606–1669) exemplified the painterly style, as opposed to linear. Chiaroscuro was employed by Rembrandt and the Utrecht Caravaggists such as Hendrick ter Brugghen (1588–1629) and Johannes Moreelse (c. 1603–1634). Rembrandt's teachers were Leiden's Jacob Isaacsz. van Swanenburg (1571–1638) and Amsterdam's Pieter Lastman (1583–1633).

The Delft school included Johannes Vermeer (1632–1675), Pieter de Hooch (1629–1679), Gerard ter Borch (1617–1681), Carel Fabritius (1622–1654), Nicolaes Maes (1634–1693), Gerard Houckgeest (c. 1600–1661), Emanuel de Witte (1617–1692) and Hendrick Cornelisz. van Vliet (1612–1675). Vermeer, de Hooch, and ter Borch brought great workmanship to painting domestic scenes; Vermeer's proficient technique has artists debate whether he used a camera obscura.

Johannes Vermeer, Girl with a Pearl Earring (c. 1665, Mauritshuis).

Ter Borch influenced Leiden genre painters Jan Steen (c. 1626–1679) and Fijnschilder Gerrit Dou (1613–1675), along with Pieter Leermans (c. 1635–1706), Gabriel Metsu (1629–1667), Godfried Schalcken (1643–1706), Quirijn van Brekelenkam (c. 1622–c. 1669), Frans van Mieris the Elder (1635–1681), and Adriaen van der Werff (1659–1722).

The Haarlem school included Frans Hals (c. 1582–1666), Judith Leyster (1609–1660), her husband Jan Miense Molenaer (1610–1668), landscape painter Jacob van Ruisdael (c. 1629–1682), and still life painters Pieter Claesz (c. 1597–1660) and Willem Claesz. Heda (1594–c. 1680), influencing pronkstilleven painter Abraham van Beyeren (c. 1620–1690).

==== German Baroque ====
German Baroque was limited by the devastation of the Thirty Years War (1618–1648), but still saw Italian influenced painters such as Hans Rottenhammer (1564–1625), Adam Elsheimer (1578–1610), Johann Heinrich Schönfeld (1609–1684), Johann Liss (c. 1590–1630), Johann Carl Loth (1632–1698), and Joachim von Sandrart (1606–1688). Notable Baroque painting museums in Germany include Munich's Alte Pinakothek and Dresden's Gemäldegalerie Alte Meister.

==== French Baroque ====
Image Gallery (Click "Show" to view)
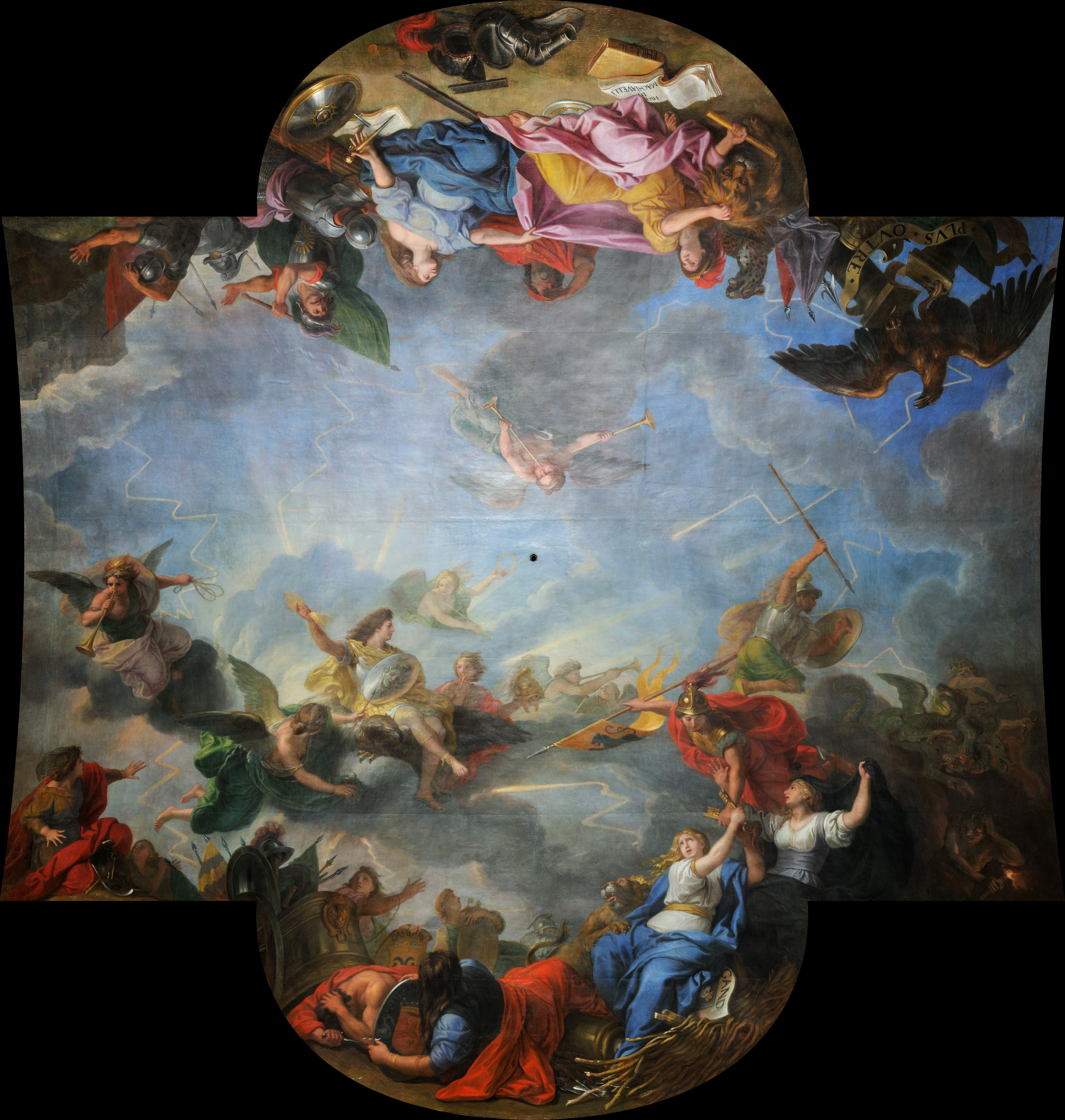
Charles Le Brun, Capture of the city and citadel of Gand in six days, 1678 (c. 1684), part of the ceiling of the Hall of Mirrors in the Palace of Versailles.

Hyacinthe Rigaud, Portrait of Louis XIV (1701, Louvre).

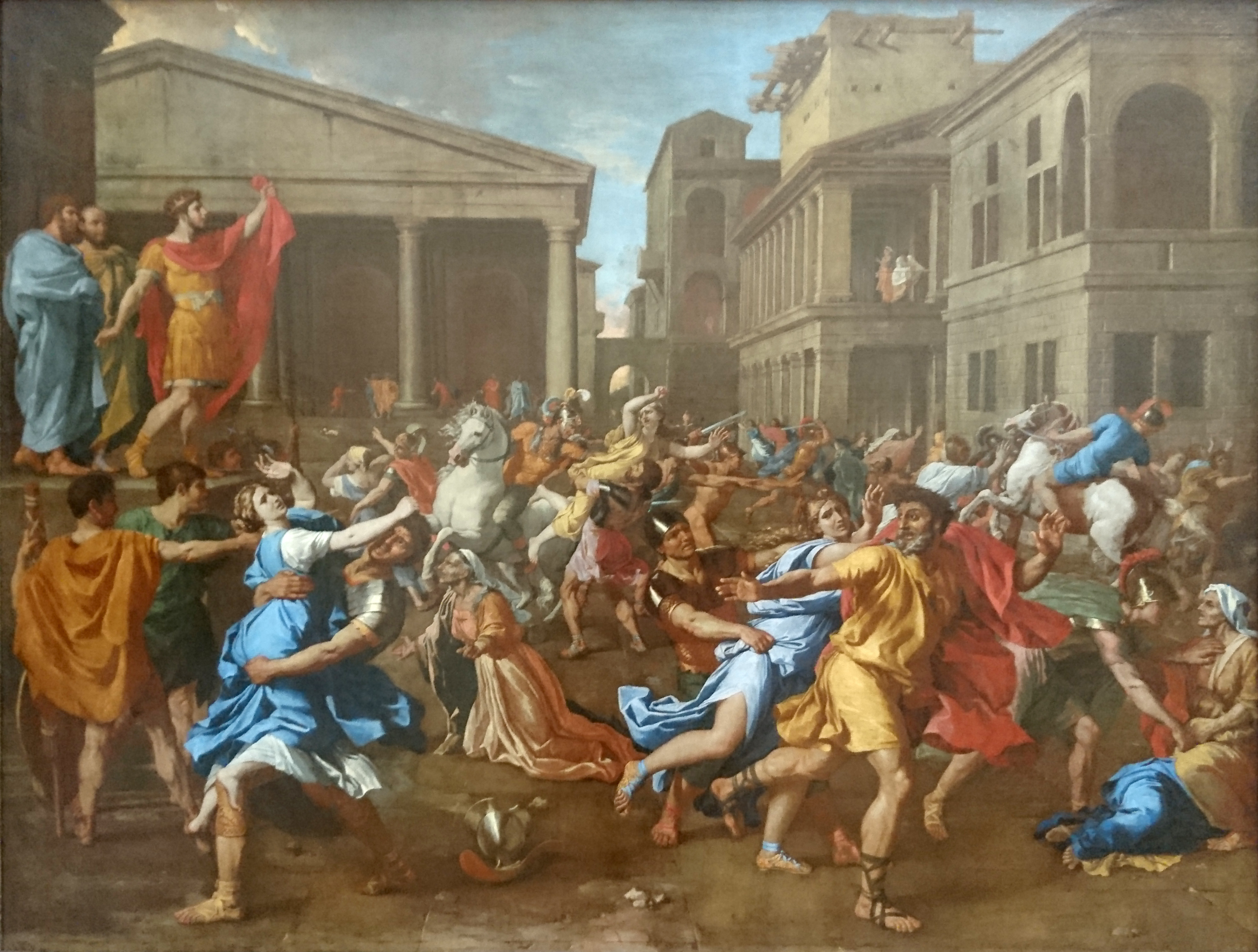
Nicolas Poussin, The Abduction of the Sabines (1638, Louvre).

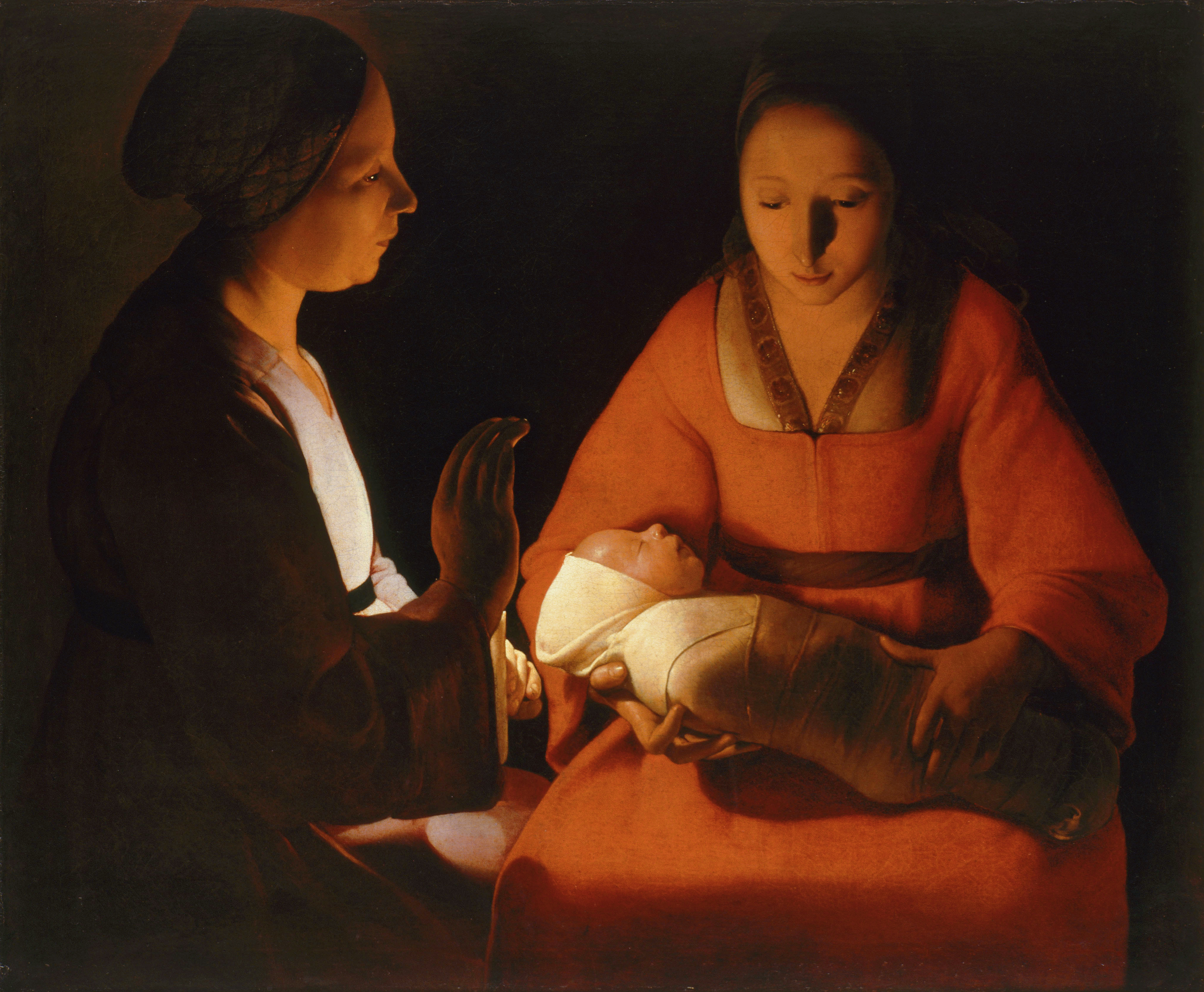
Georges de La Tour, The New-born (1640s, Musée des Beaux-Arts de Rennes).

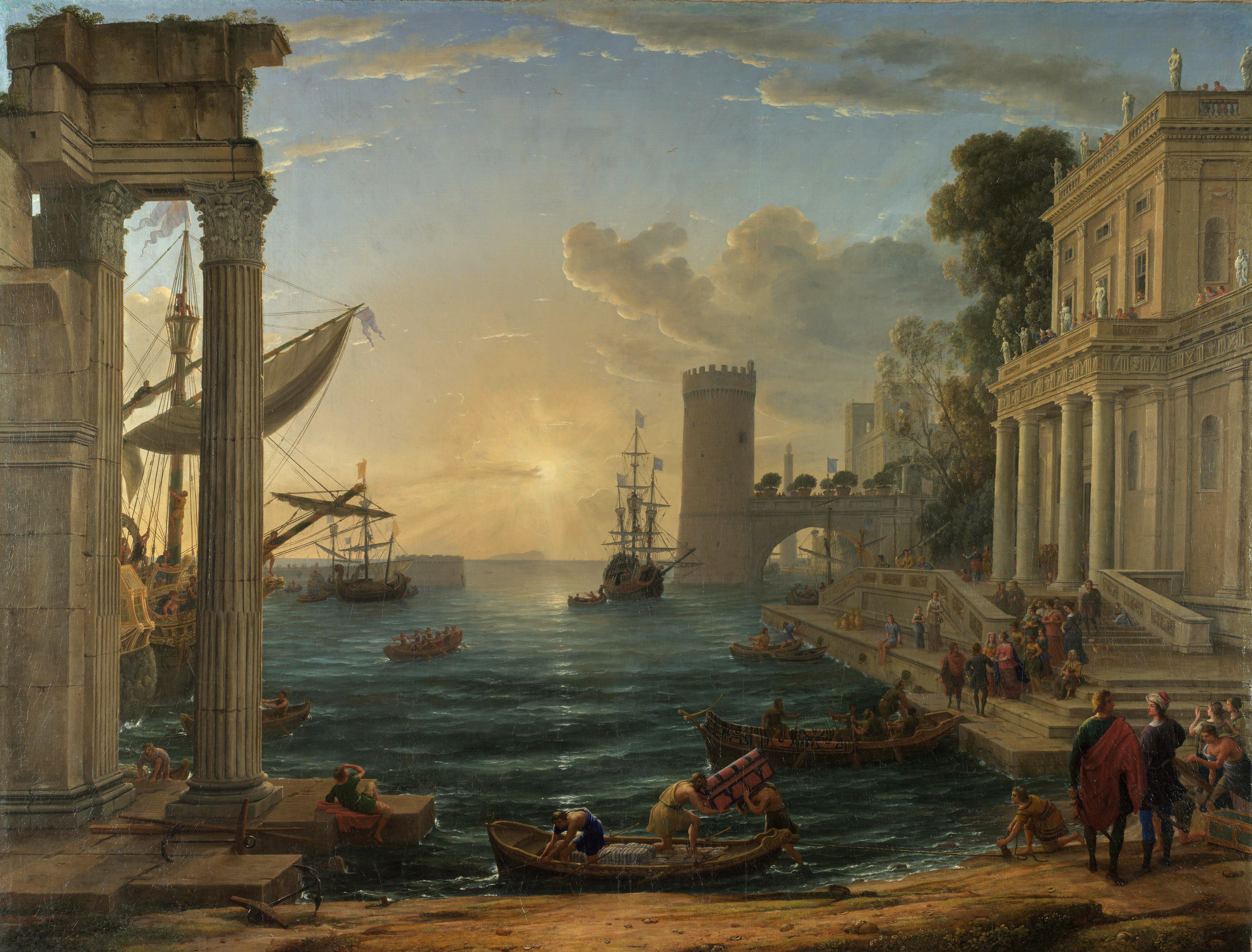
Claude Lorrain Seaport with the Embarkation of the Queen of Sheba (1648, National Gallery).

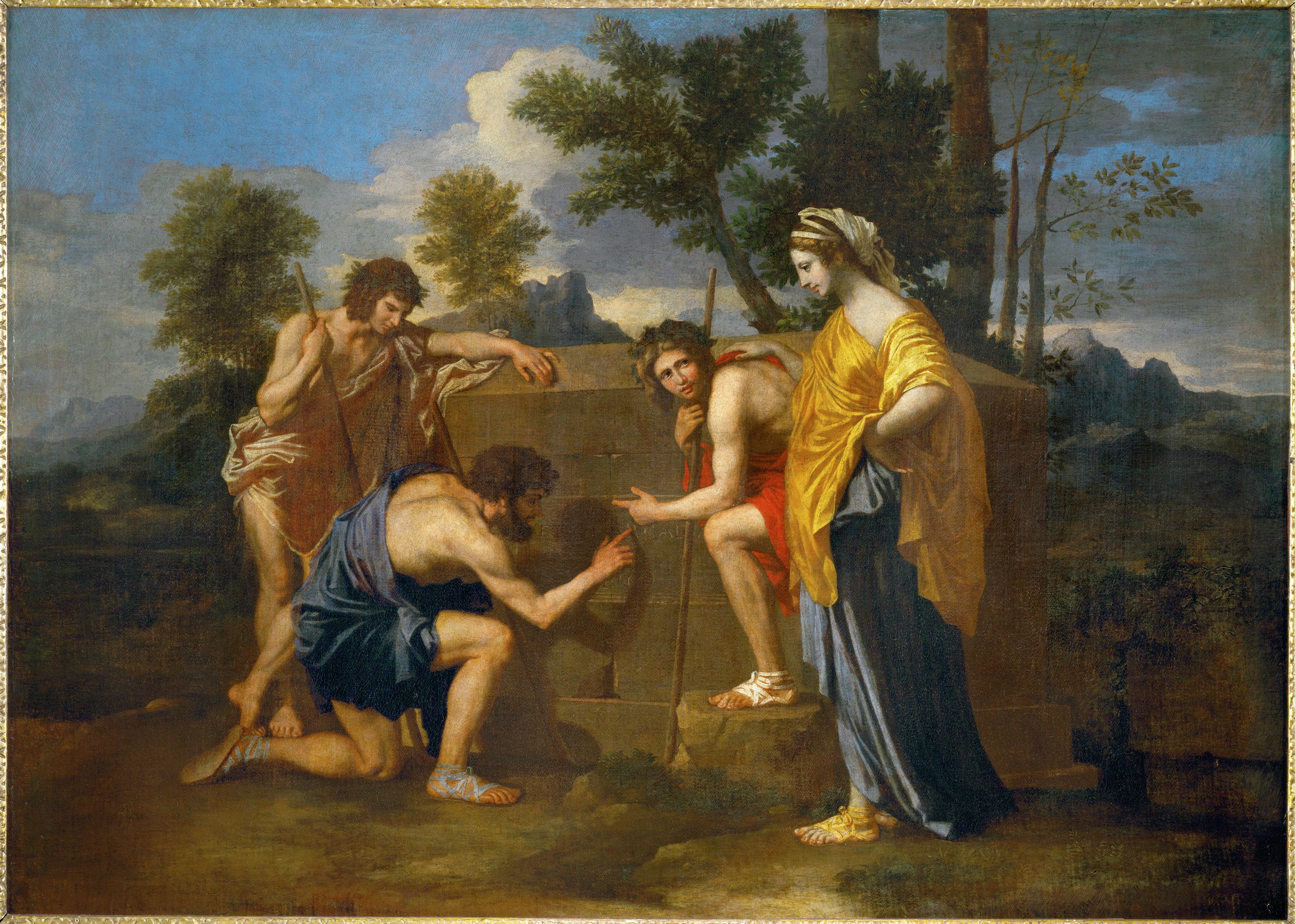
Nicolas Poussin, Et in Arcadia Ego (1638, Louvre).

France in the early modern period became the cultural center of Europe, especially under the reign of "Sun King" Louis XIV (1638–1715), and the preceding Louis XIII (1601–1643). Louis XIV's court painters include Charles Le Brun (1619–1690) and Hyacinthe Rigaud (1659–1743). 1667 saw the first Paris Salon art exhibition, of the Académie royale de peinture et de sculpture.

Painters like Le Brun, preferring outline and drawing, were called Poussinists, Nicolas Poussin (1594–1665) followers, while those preferring color were called Rubenists, Rubens followers. Additional French baroque painters include the Le Nain brothers, Antoine (c. 1600–1648), Louis (c. 1603–1648), and Mathieu (1607–1677), Georges de La Tour (1593–1652), and landscape painter Claude Lorrain (c. 1600–1682). Frenchmen trained in Italy such as Poussin, La Tour, and Lorrain are known as "classical Baroque".

==== Spanish Baroque ====
Image Gallery (Click "Show" to view)
Diego Velázquez, Las Meninas (1656, Museo del Prado).

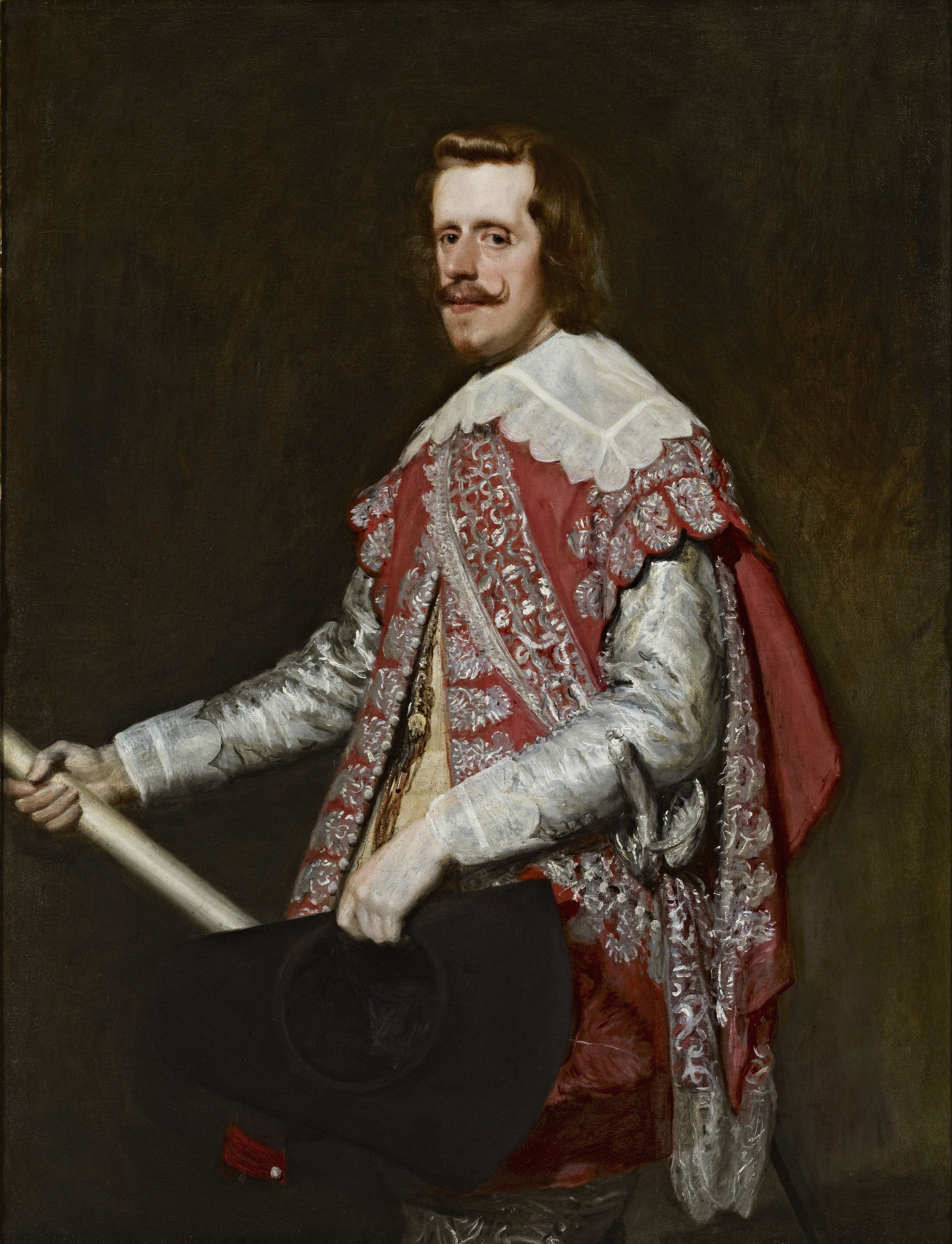
Portrait of Philip IV in Fraga (c. 1644, The Frick)

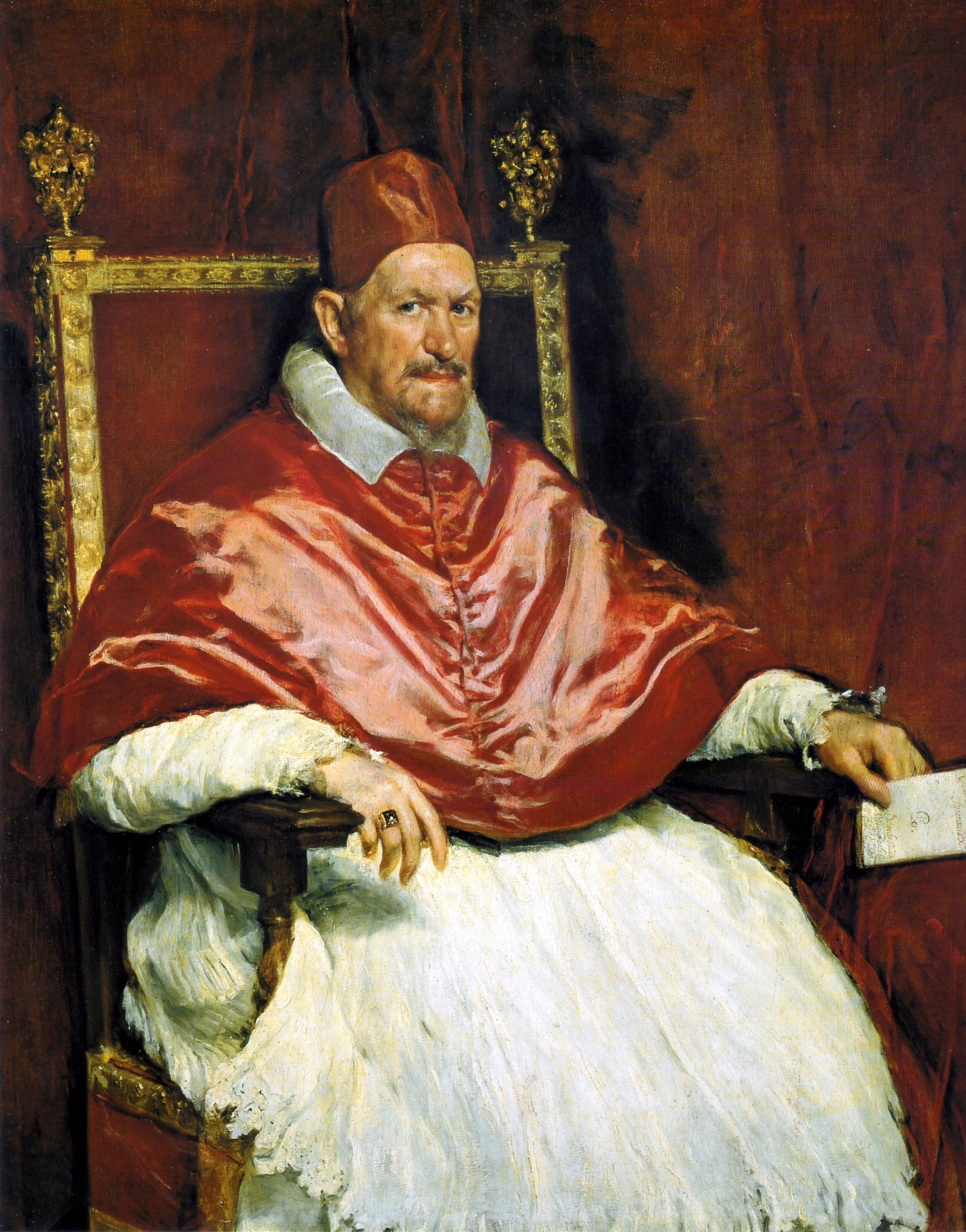
Diego Velázquez, Portrait of Innocent X (c. 1650, Galleria Doria Pamphilj).

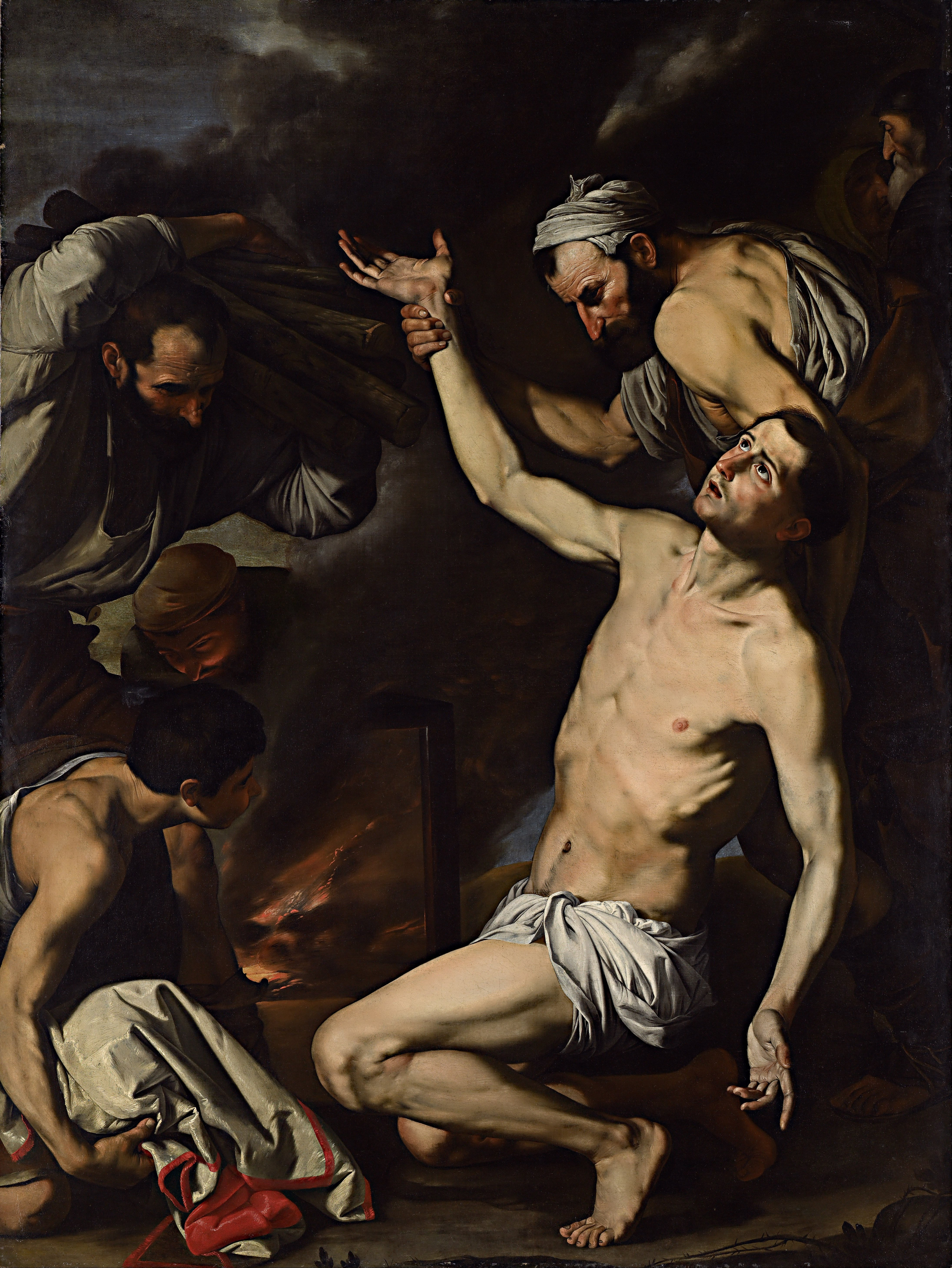
Jusepe de Ribera, Martyrdom of St Lawrence (1624, National Gallery of Victoria).

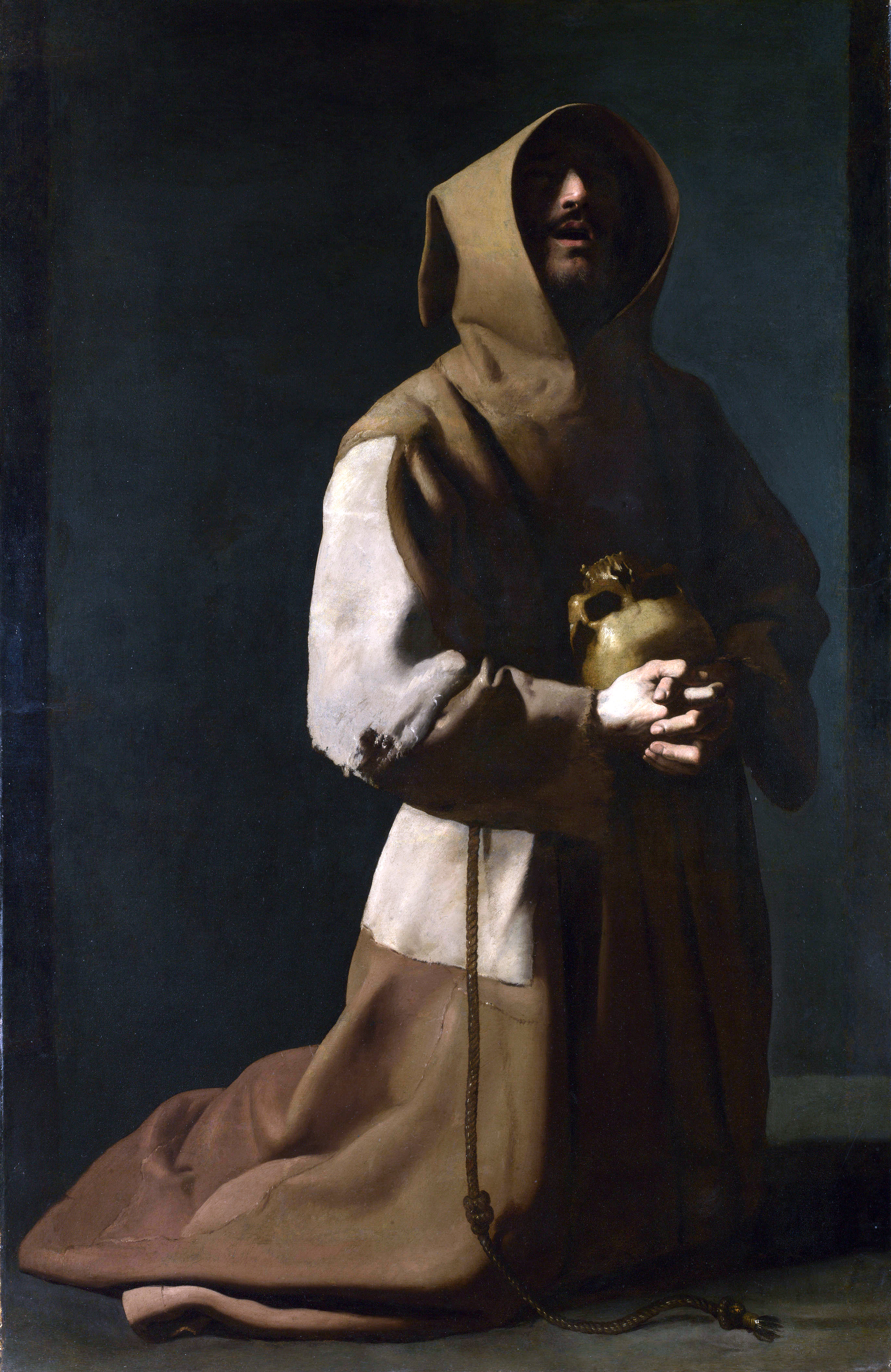
Francisco de Zurbarán, Saint Francis in Meditation (1639, National Gallery).

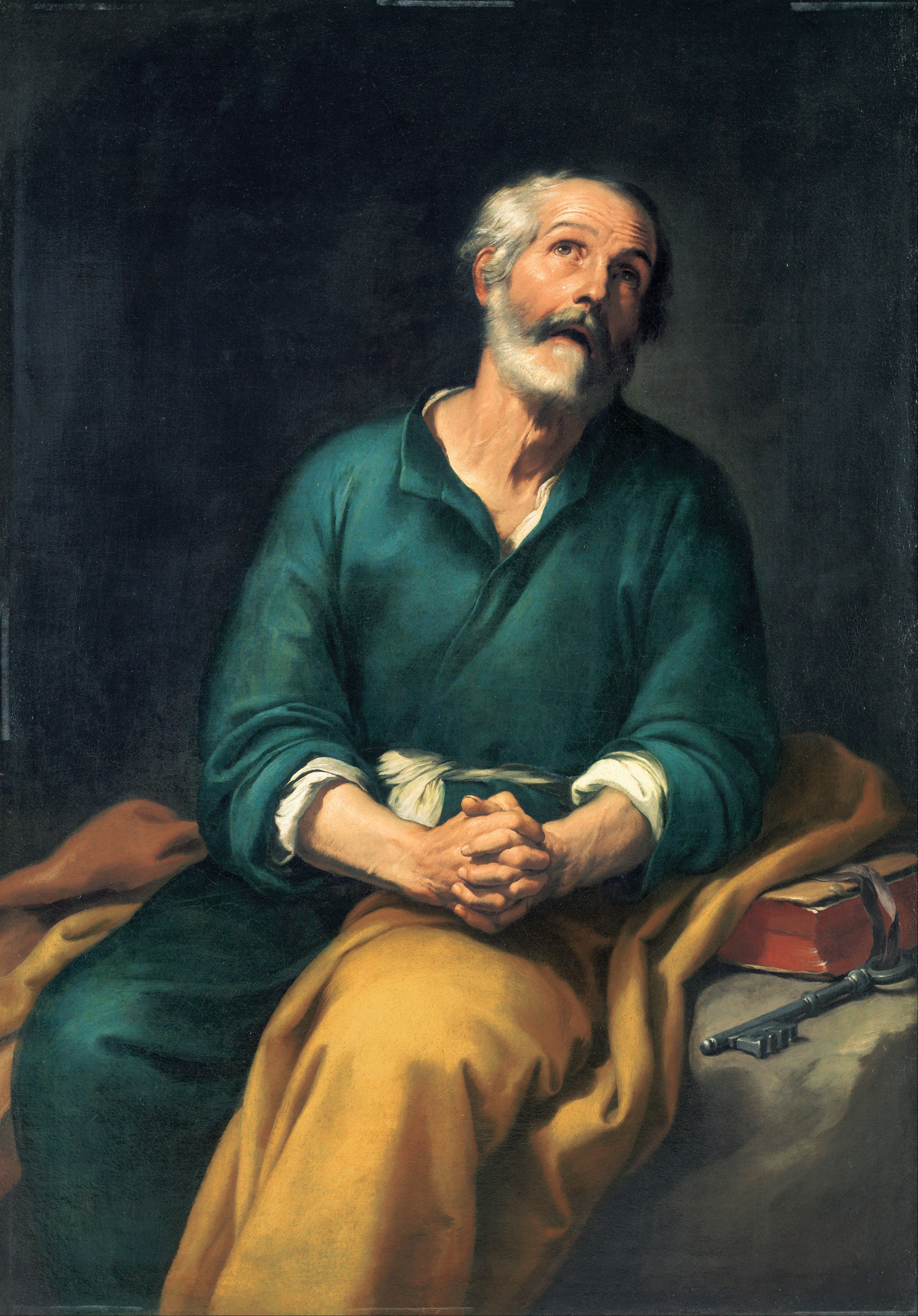
Bartolomé Esteban Murillo, Saint Peter in Tears (c. 1655, Museo de Bellas Artes de Bilbao).

Spanish Golden Age Baroque painting, influenced by realism and Catholic decorum, in response to Mannerist distortions and beauty in excess, included King Philip IV court painter Diego Velázquez (1599–1660), Jusepe de Ribera (1591–1652), tenebrist Francisco de Zurbarán (1598–1664), and Bartolomé Esteban Murillo (1617–1682). Spain's main painting museum is Madrid's Museo del Prado.

=== Rococo ===
Image Gallery (Click "Show" to view)
Antoine Watteau, The Embarkation for Cythera (c. 1719, Louvre).

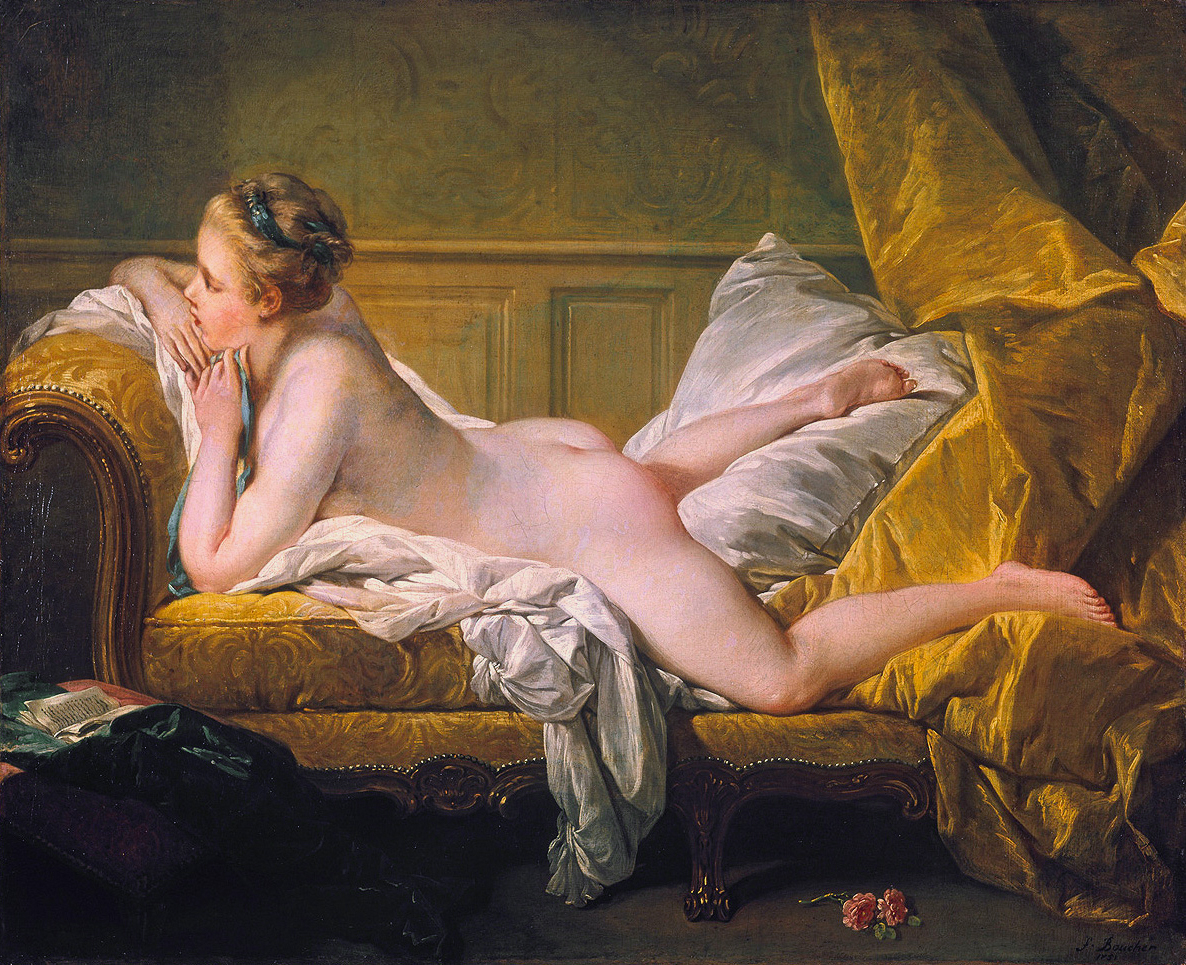
François Boucher, Resting Maiden (1751, Wallraf–Richartz Museum).

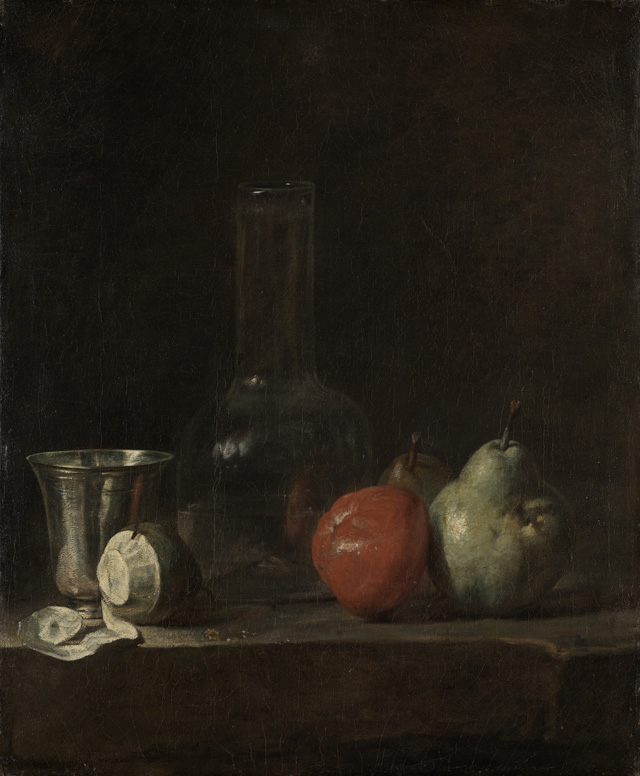
Jean-Baptiste-Siméon Chardin, Still Life with Glass Flask and Fruit (c. 1728, Staatliche Kunsthalle Karlsruhe).

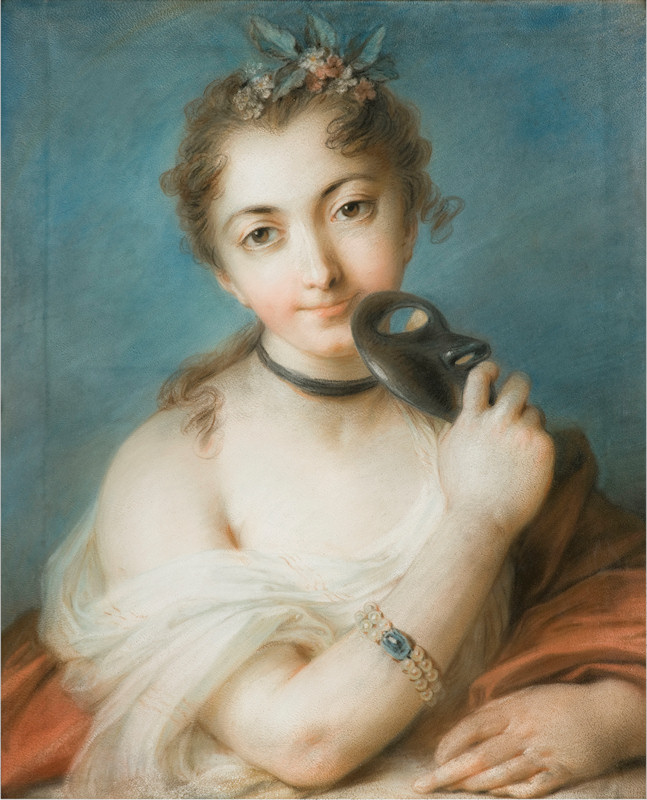
Rosalba Carriera, Portrait of a Woman with Mask (c. 1725, Palazzo Melzi d'Eril, Milan) (Fondazione Cariplo)

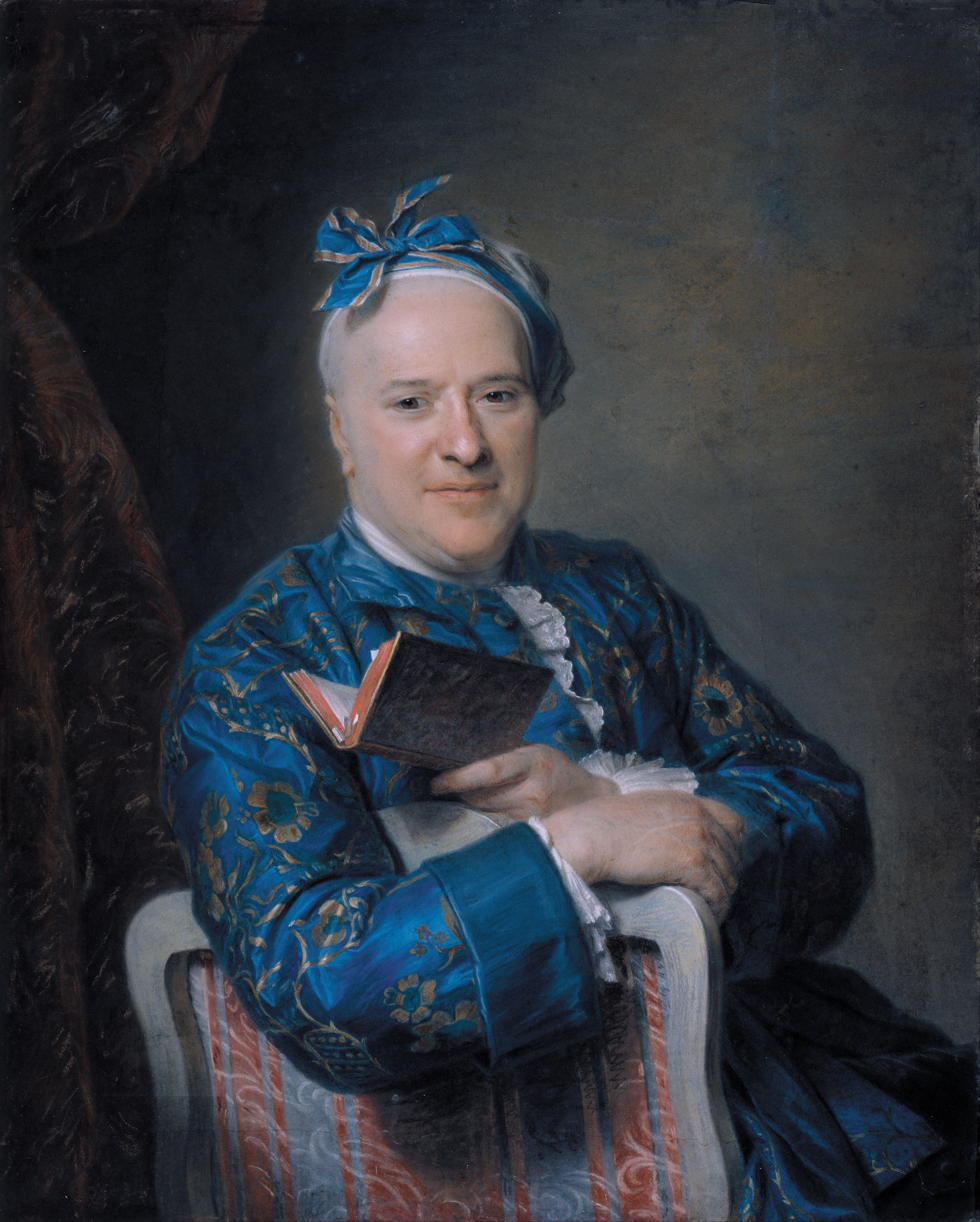
Maurice Quentin de La Tour, Portrait of Pierre-Louis Laideguive (c. 1761, Museu Nacional d'Art de Catalunya).

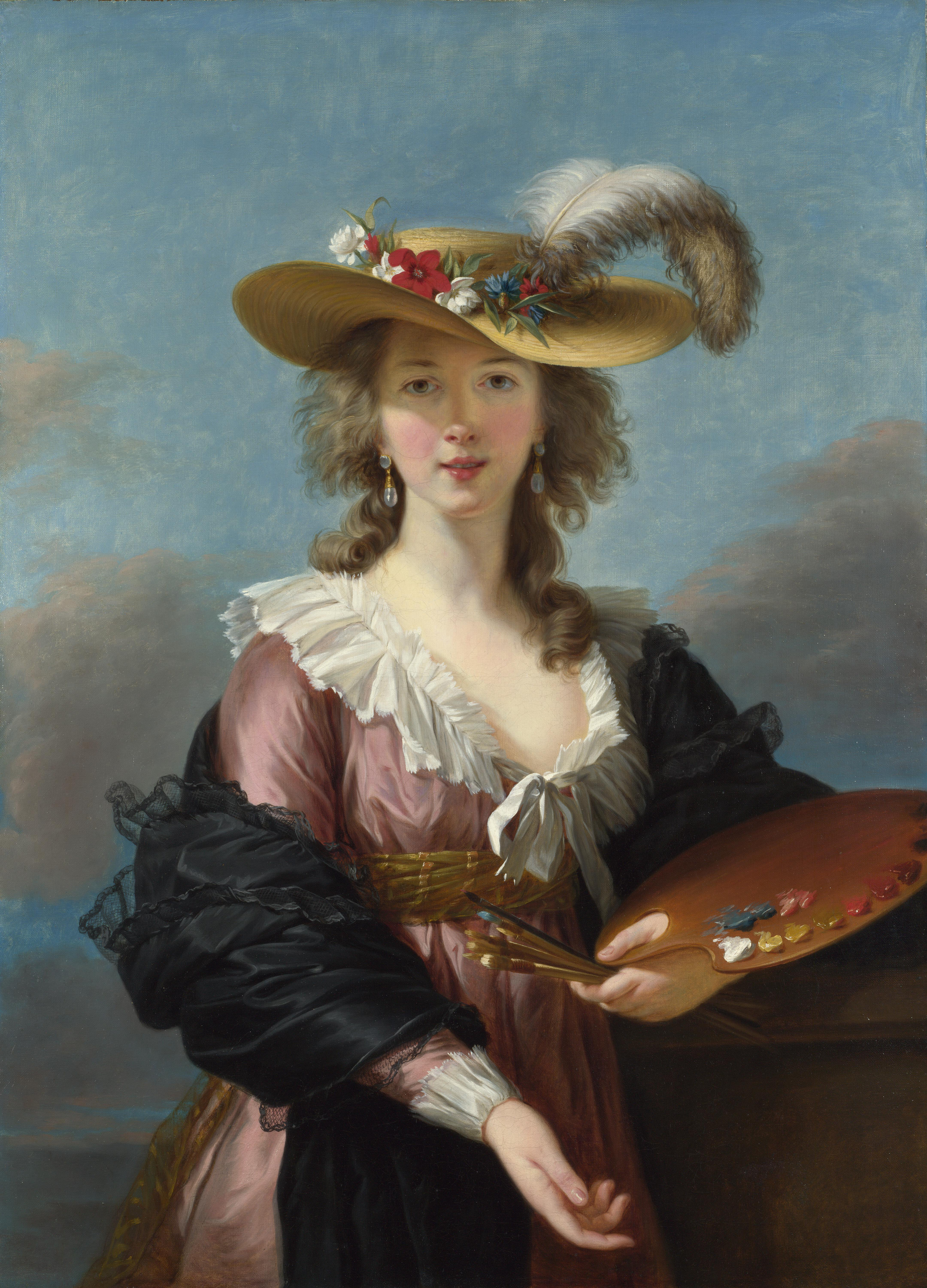
Élisabeth-Louise Vigée-Le Brun, Self Portrait in a Straw Hat (c. 1783, National Gallery).

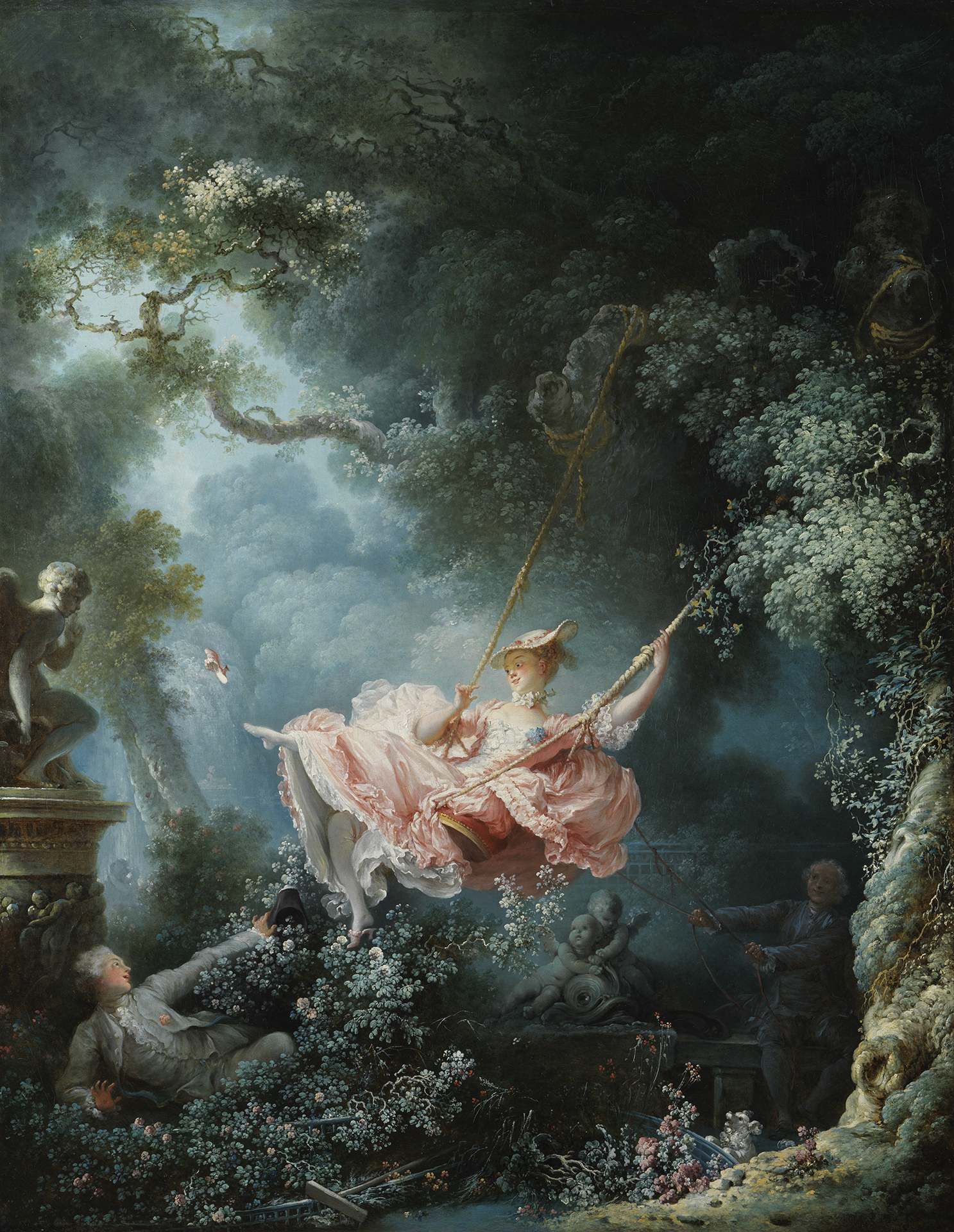
Jean-Honoré Fragonard, The Swing (c. 1768, Wallace Collection).

Rococo painting followed as a lighter form of Baroque, often frivolous and erotic with light pastel colours, peaking in the 1730s. Rococo developed first in French decorative arts and interior design, during Louis XV's (1710–1774) succession. Rococo maintained Baroque's complex forms and intricate patterns, but also included Oriental designs and asymmetry.

Rococo declined by the early 1760s. Jacques-François Blondel (1705–1774) decried the "ridiculous jumble of shells, dragons, reeds, palm-trees and plants". Philosophe Voltaire (1694–1778) described Rococo as "degenerate" and "superficial".

Rococo masters include Frenchmen Jean-Antoine Watteau (1684–1721), François Boucher (1703–1773), and Jean-Honoré Fragonard (1732–1806); and Italians Giovanni Battista Piazzetta (1682–1754), Giovanni Battista Tiepolo (1696–1770), and pastel painter Rosalba Carriera (1673–1757). Jean-Baptiste-Siméon Chardin (1699–1779) was considered by some Anti-Rococo, and most highly skilled.

French Rococo also includes Jean-Baptiste Greuze (1725–1805), philosophe Denis Diderot's (1713–1784) favorite painter, adept in portraits and history paintings. Pastel painter Maurice Quentin de La Tour (1704–1788), and Élisabeth Vigée-Lebrun (1755–1842) were accomplished portrait painters.

The Rococo style spread to Germany, Bohemia, and Austria. Germans like Gottfried Semper (1803–1879) posited a German origin for Rococo. Especially in Catholic Southern Germany, Rococo painting was applied to churches and palaces, such as by Johann Baptist Zimmermann (1680–1758) and Franz Martin Kuen (1719–1771), while Frederician Rococo developed in Prussia, influenced by King Frederick the Great (1712–1786) court painter Antoine Pesne (1683–1757).

Englishman William Hogarth (1697–1764) unintentionally provided a theoretical foundation for Rococo, arguing in Analysis of Beauty (1753) that curvy, undulating and serpentine lines, prominent in Rococo, were the basis for grace and beauty, unlike the Classical straight line or circle.

=== English portraiture ===
Image Gallery (Click "Show" to view)
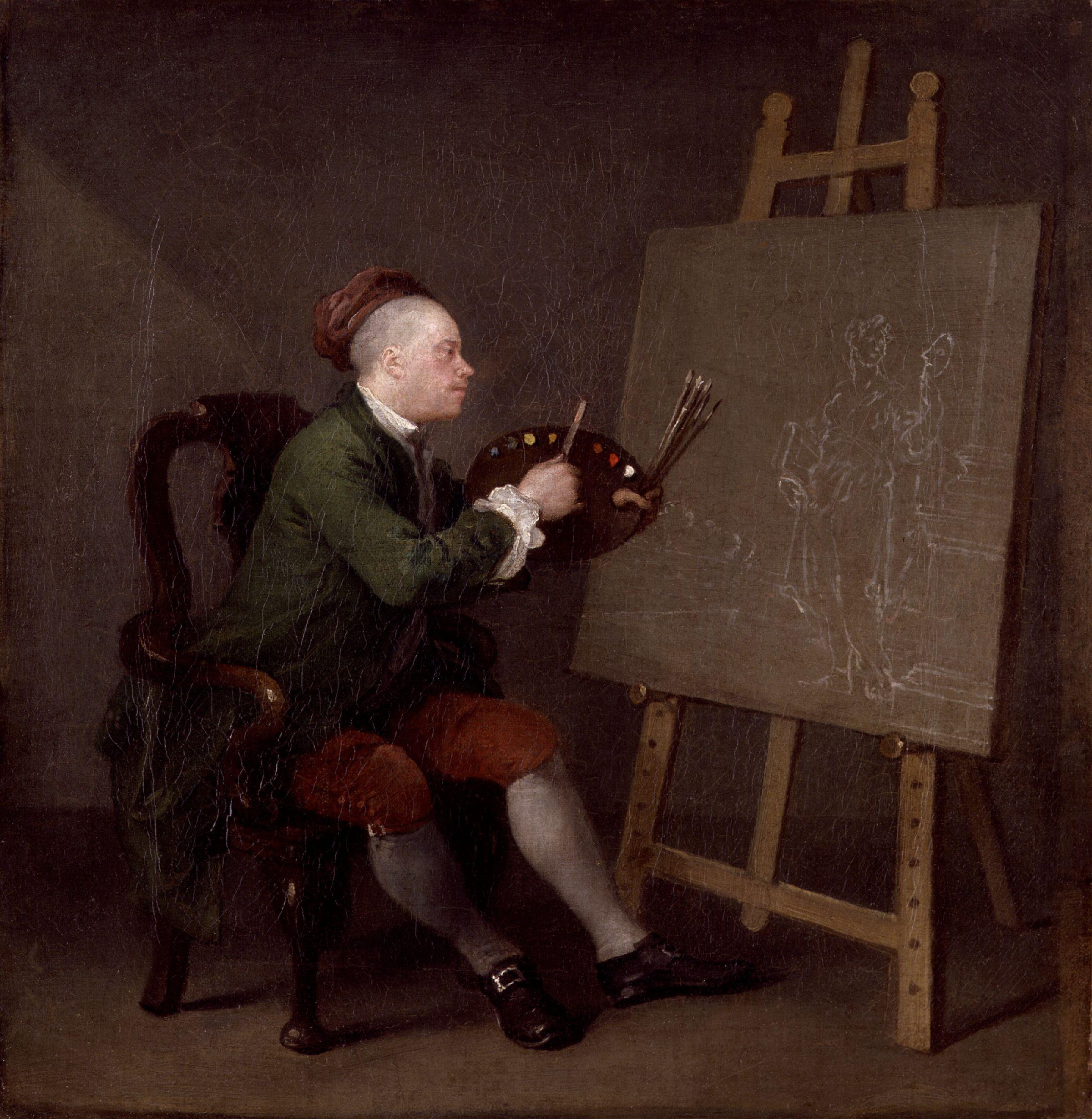
William Hogarth, Self portrait (c. 1757, National Portrait Gallery, London).

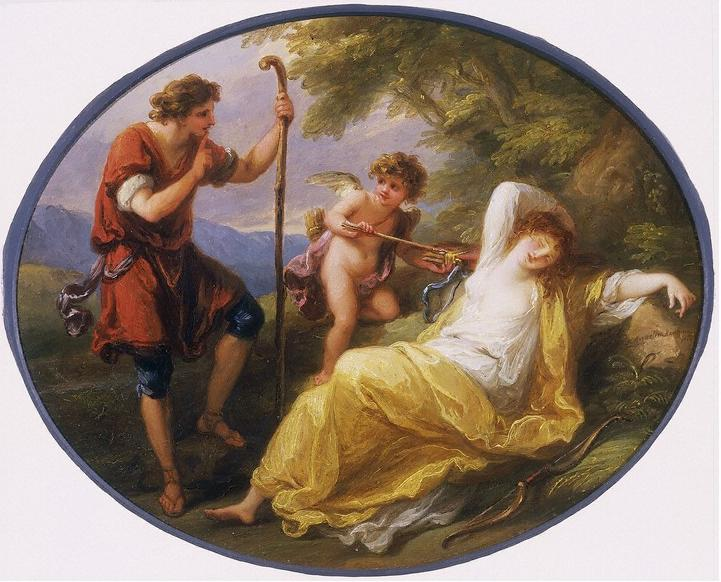
Angelica Kauffman, A Sleeping Nymph Watched by a Shepherd (c. 1780, Victoria and Albert Museum).

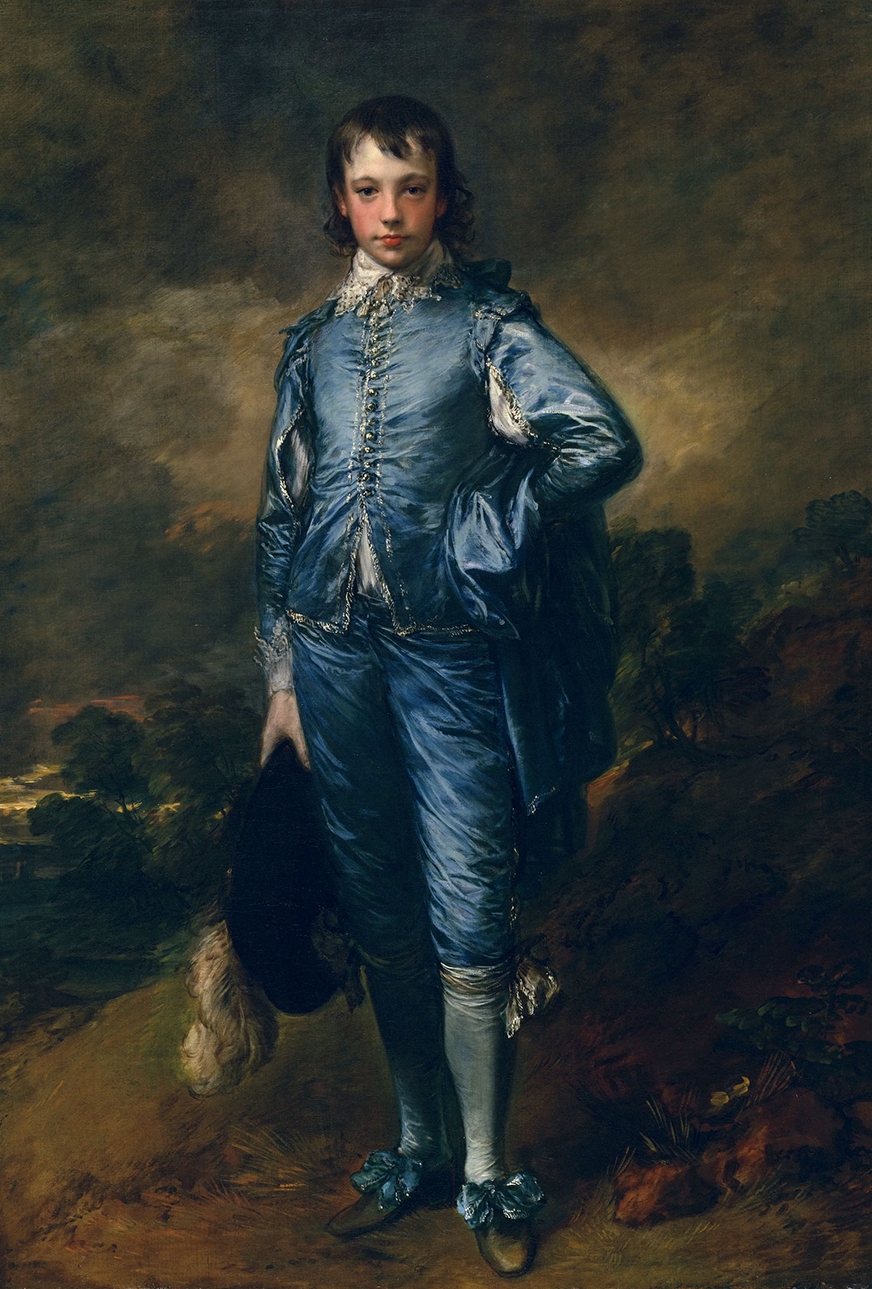
Thomas Gainsborough, The Blue Boy (c. 1770, The Huntington).

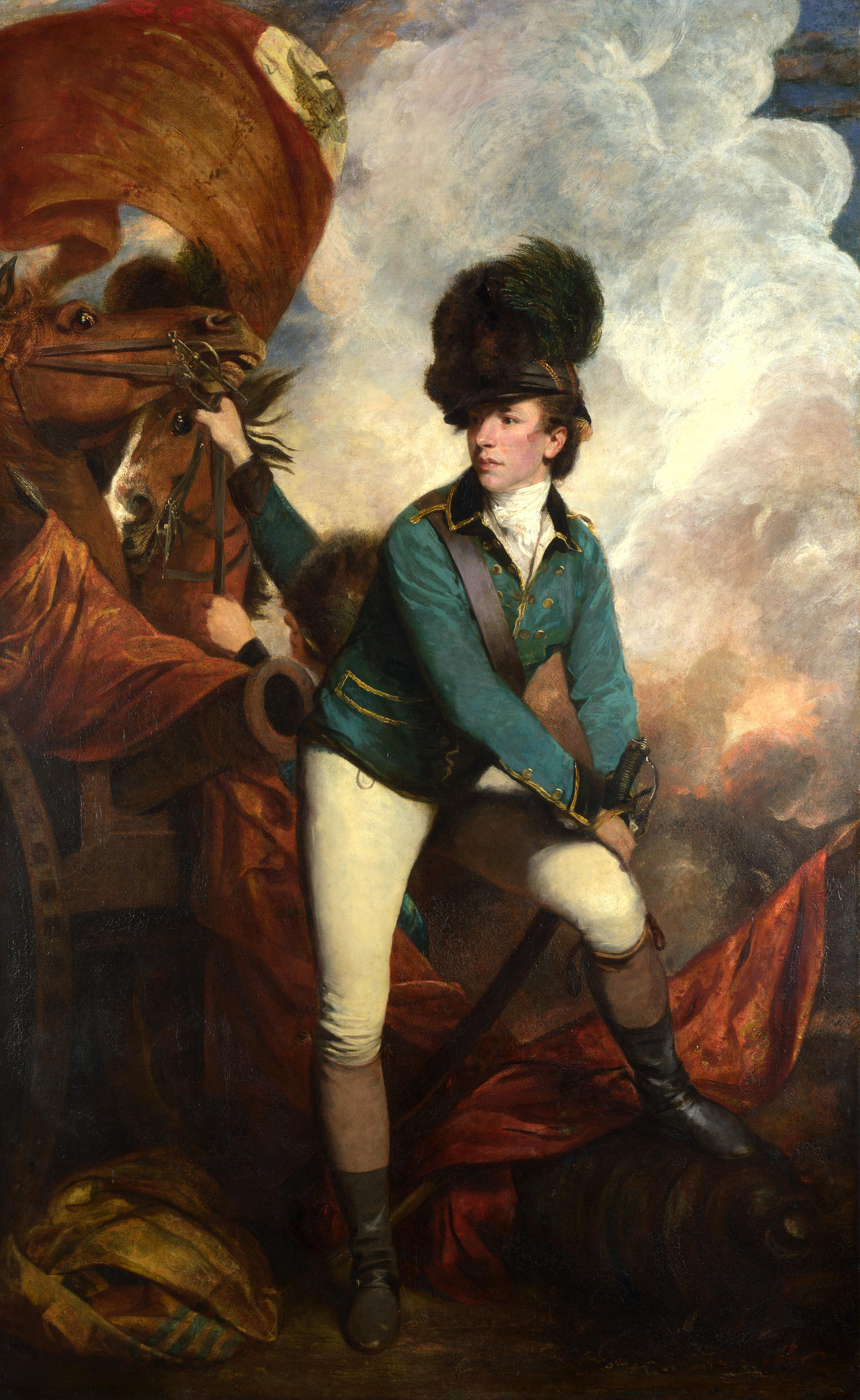
Joshua Reynolds, Portrait of Sir Banastre Tarleton (1782, National Gallery).

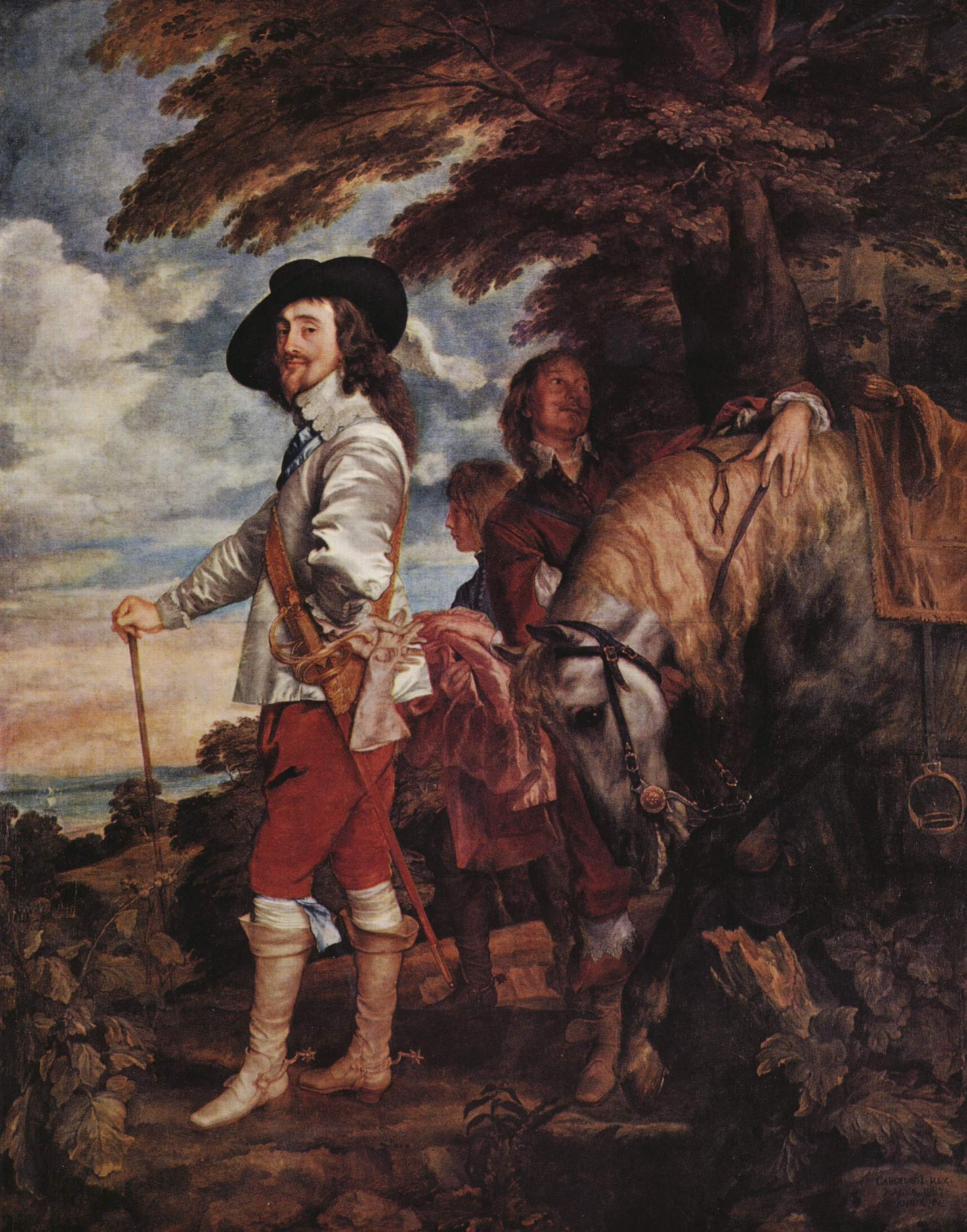
Anthony van Dyck, Charles I at the Hunt (c. 1635, Louvre).

Portraiture became the focus of a movement in England, led by blunt realist Hogarth, Francis Hayman (1708–1776), Swiss Angelica Kauffman (1741–1807), Thomas Gainsborough (1727–1788), and Joshua Reynolds (1723–1792), in the Grand Manner, influenced by Flemish expat van Dyck. Reynolds style was opposed by William Blake (1757–1827). Some of Britain's most notable collections of paintings include London's National Gallery and the Tate network.

=== Neoclassicism ===
Image Gallery (Click "Show" to view)
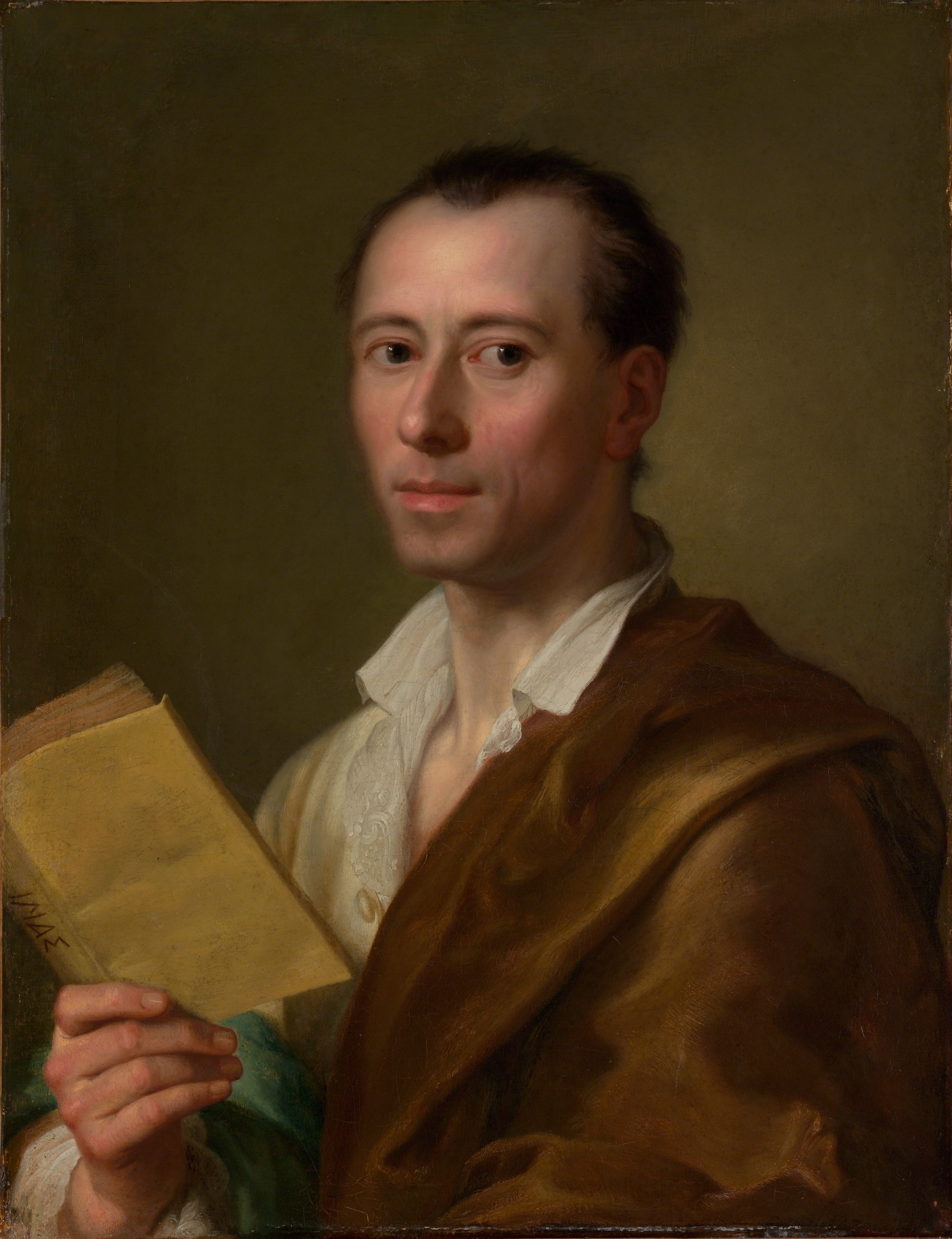
Anton Raphael Mengs, Portrait of Johann Joachim Winckelmann (c. 1777, Metropolitan Museum of Art).

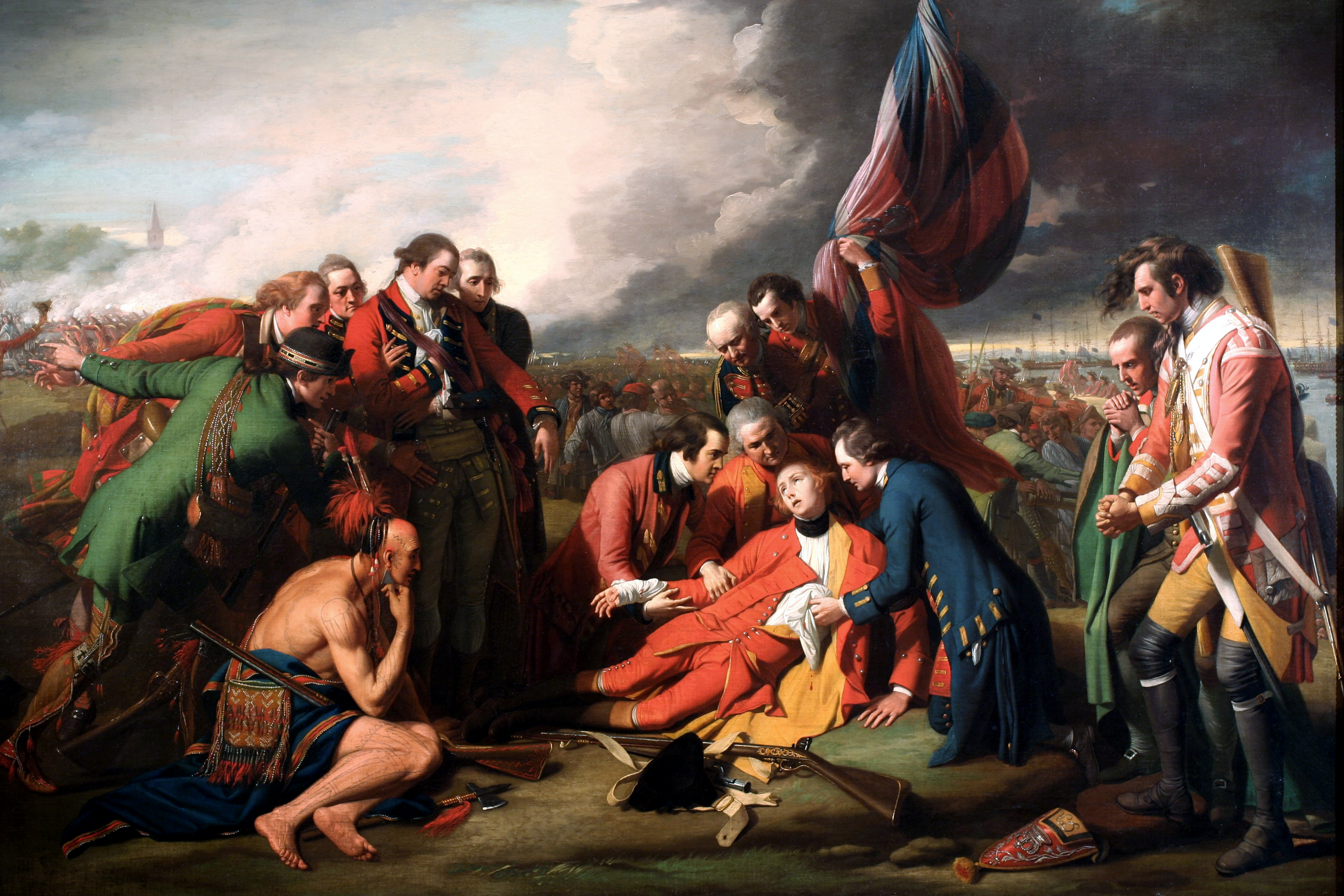
Benjamin West, The Death of General Wolfe (1770, National Gallery of Canada).

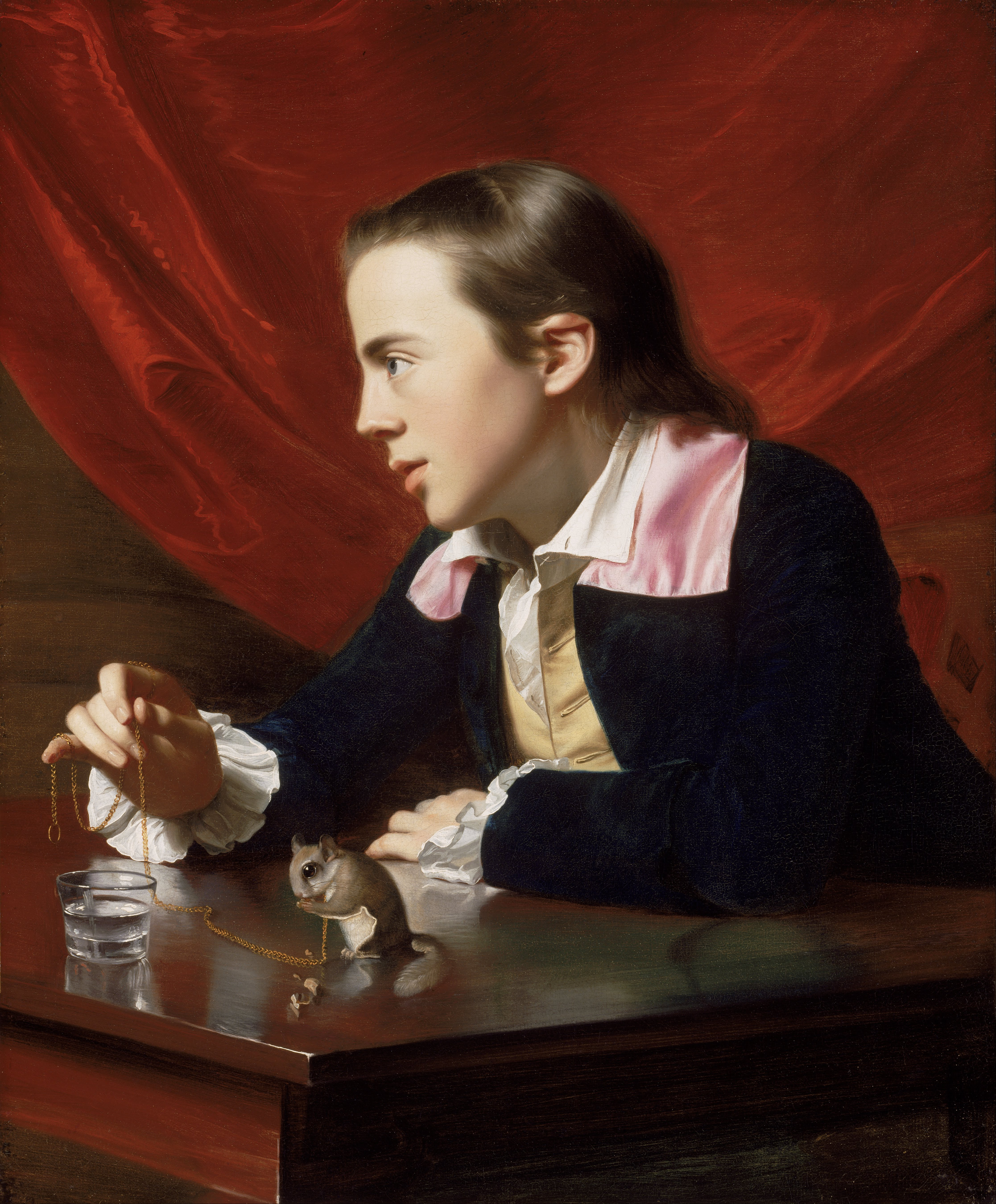
John Singleton Copley, A Boy with a Flying Squirrel (1765, Museum of Fine Arts, Boston).

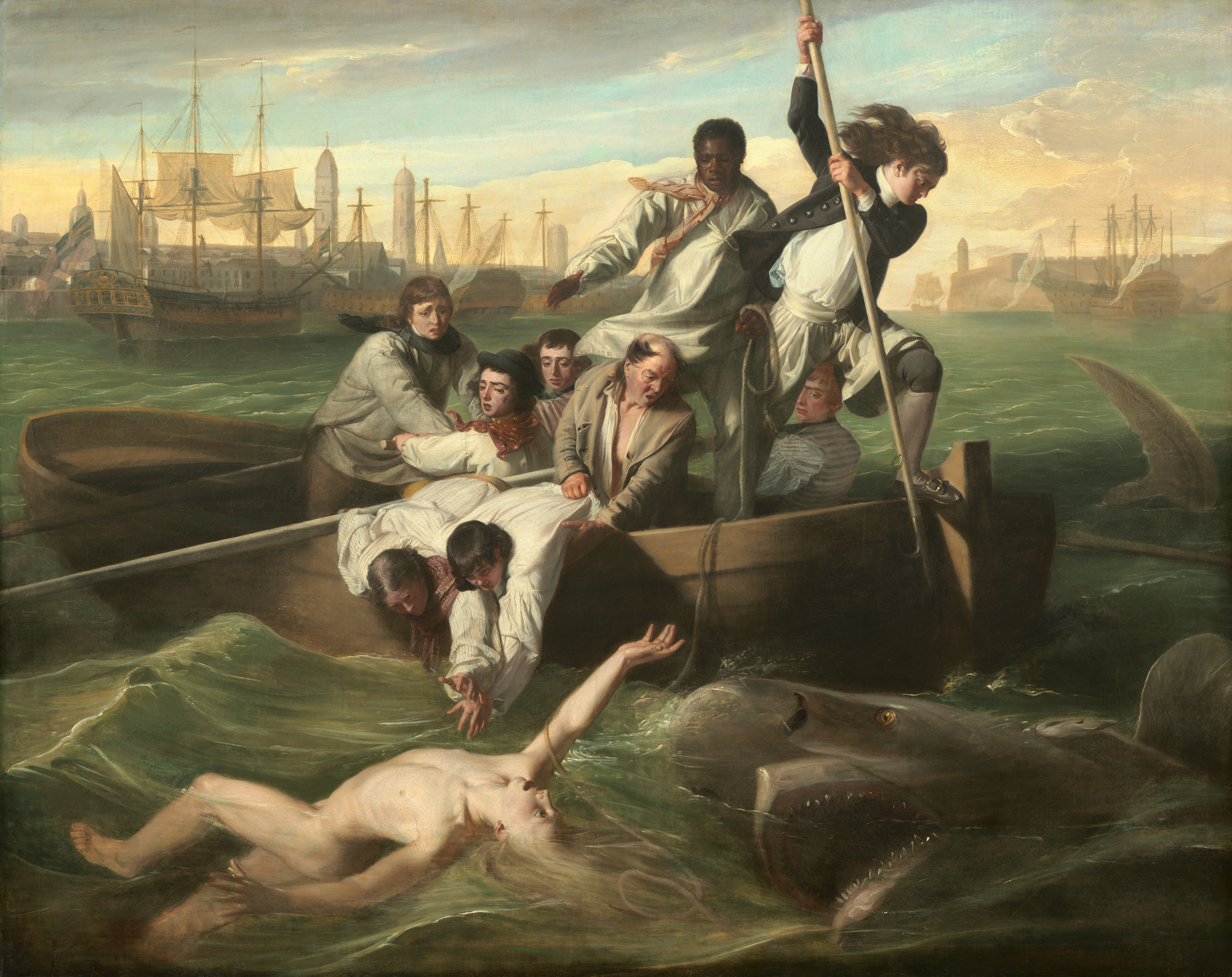
John Singleton Copley, Watson and the Shark (1778, National Gallery of Art).

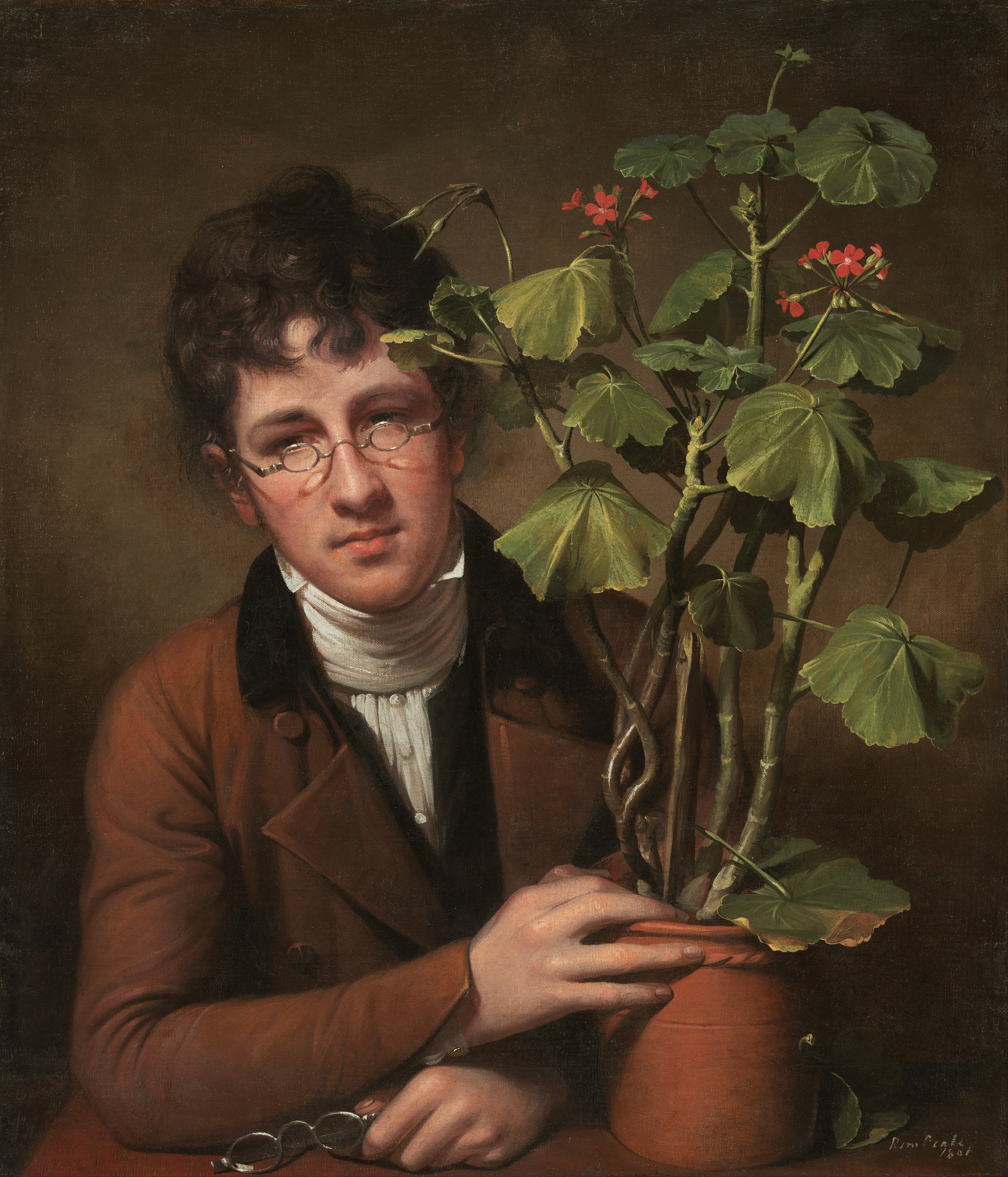
Rembrandt Peale, Rubens Peale with a Geranium (1801, National Gallery of Art)

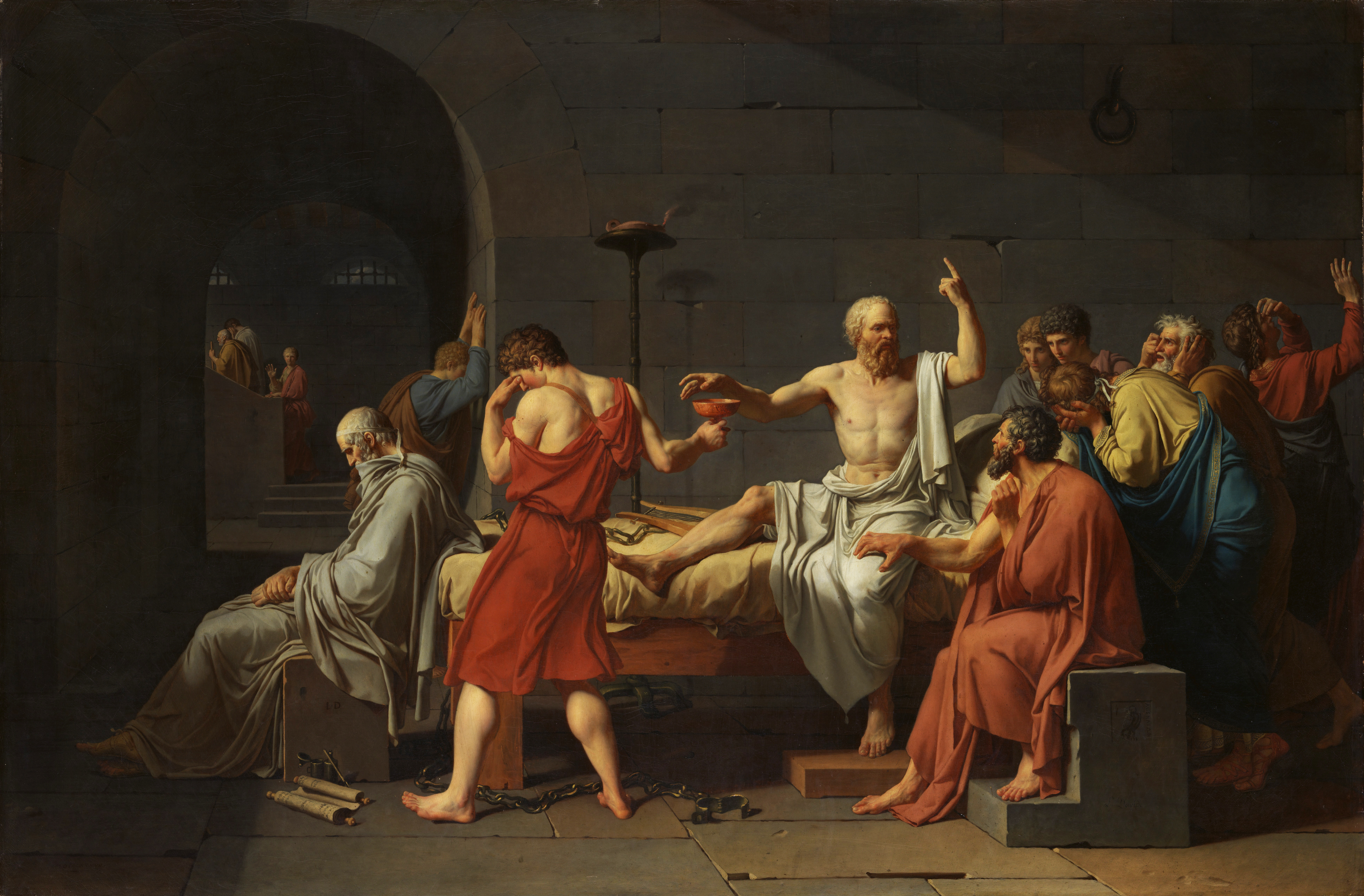
Jacques-Louis David, The Death of Socrates (1787, Metropolitan Museum of Art).

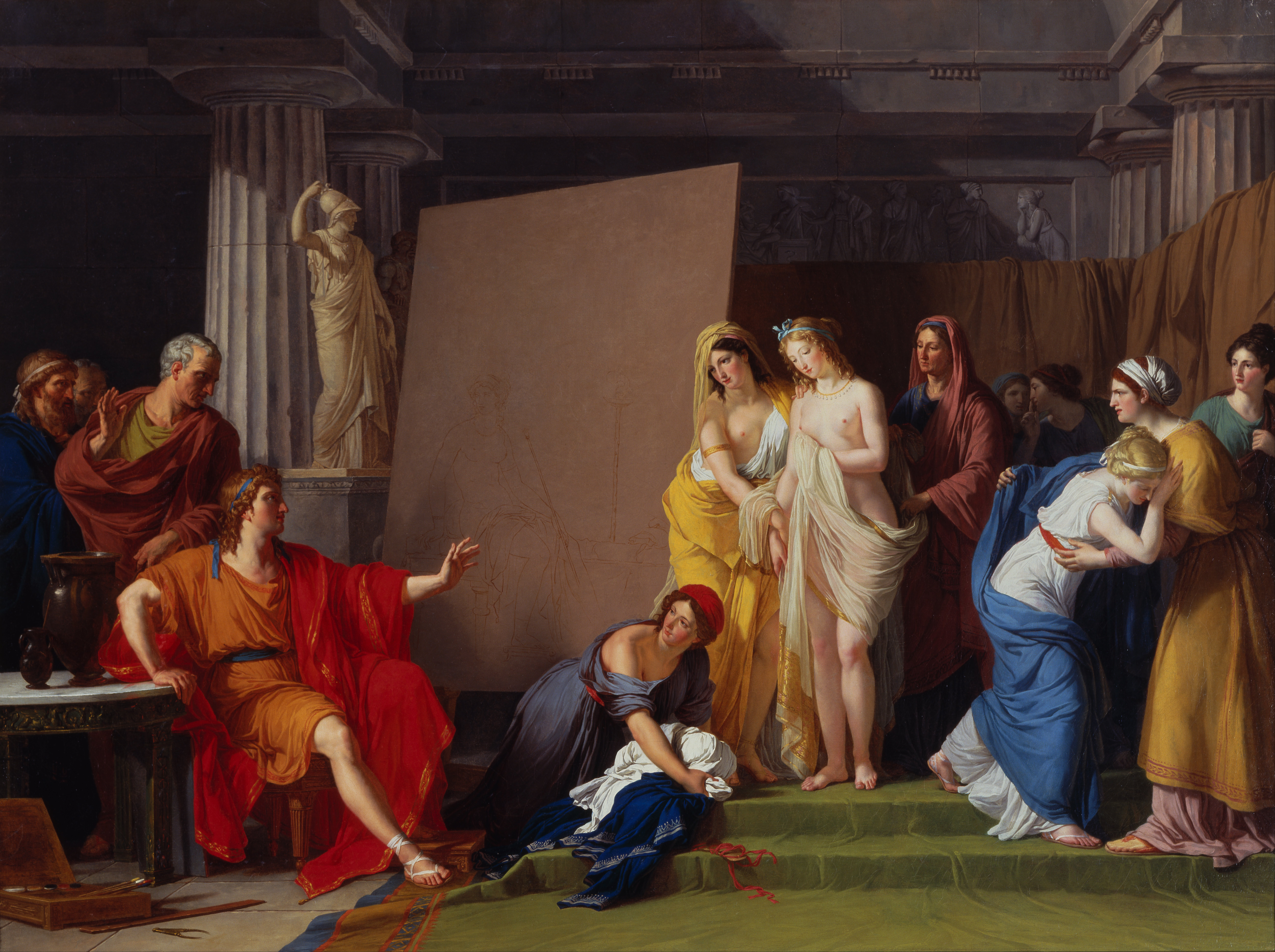
François-André Vincent, Zeuxis Choosing the Most Beautiful Women from Croton as His Models (1789, Louvre).

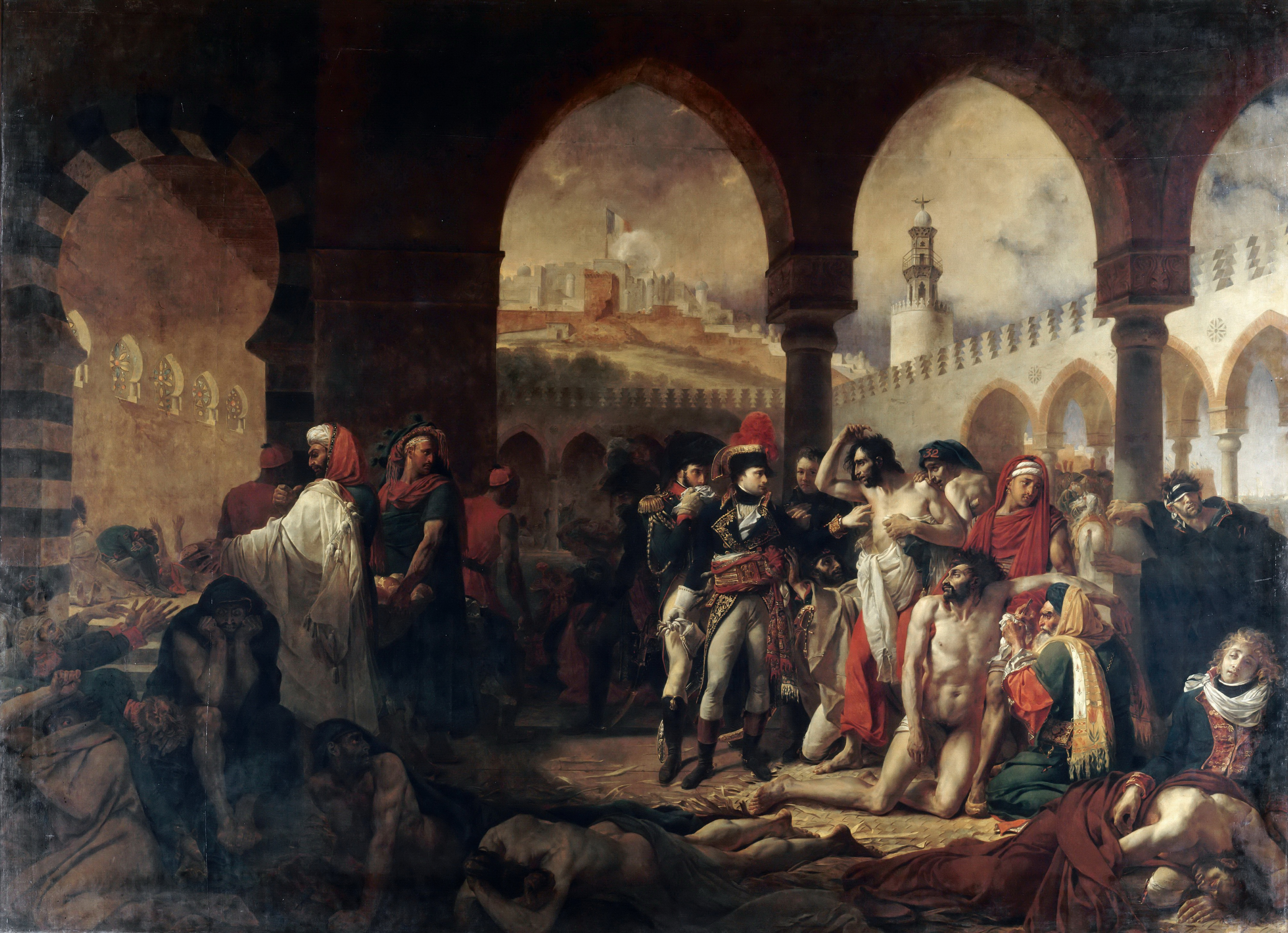
Antoine-Jean Gros, Bonaparte Visiting the Pesthouse in Jaffa (1804, Louvre).

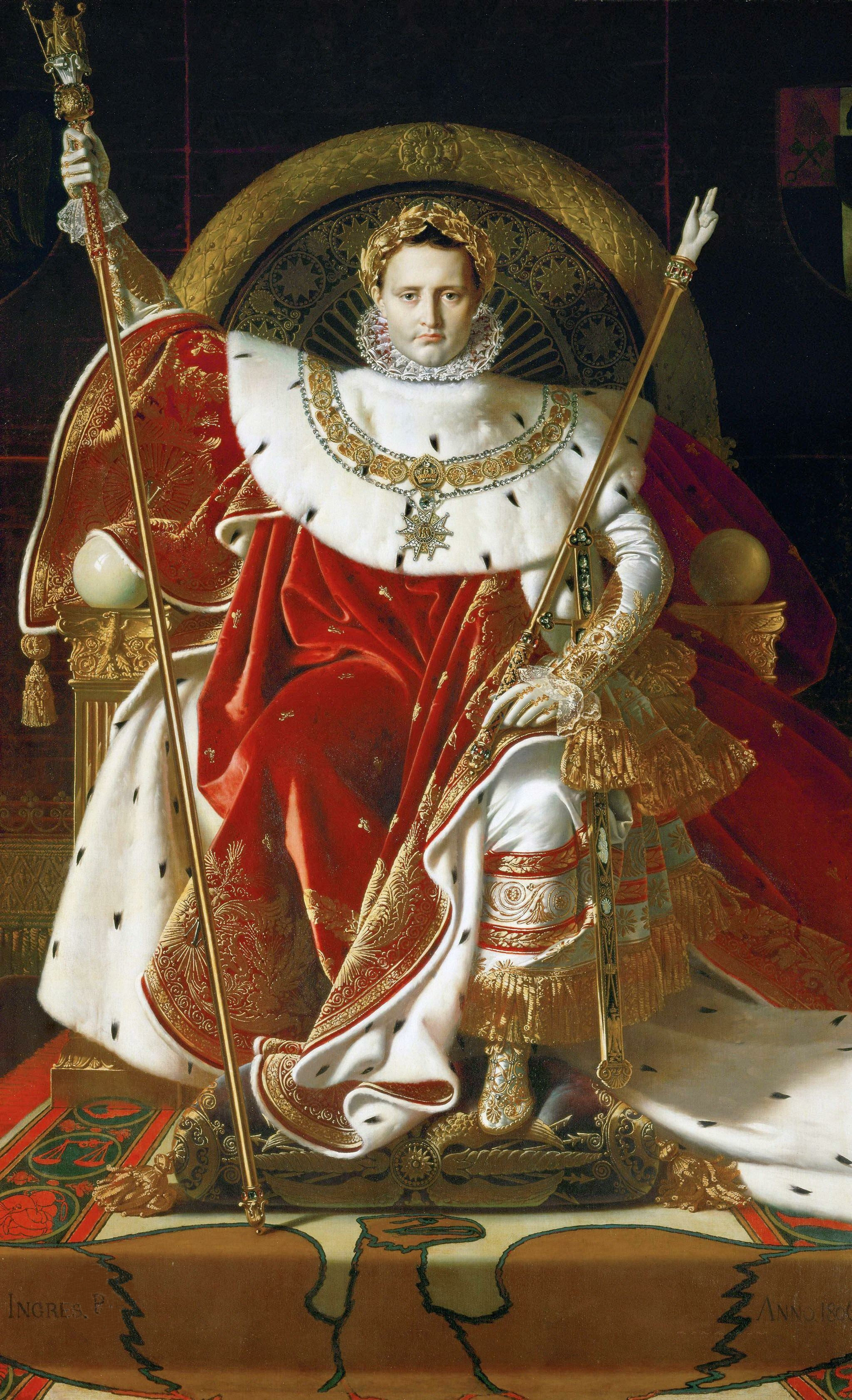
Jean-Auguste-Dominique Ingres, Napoleon on His Imperial Throne (1806, Musée de l'Armée).

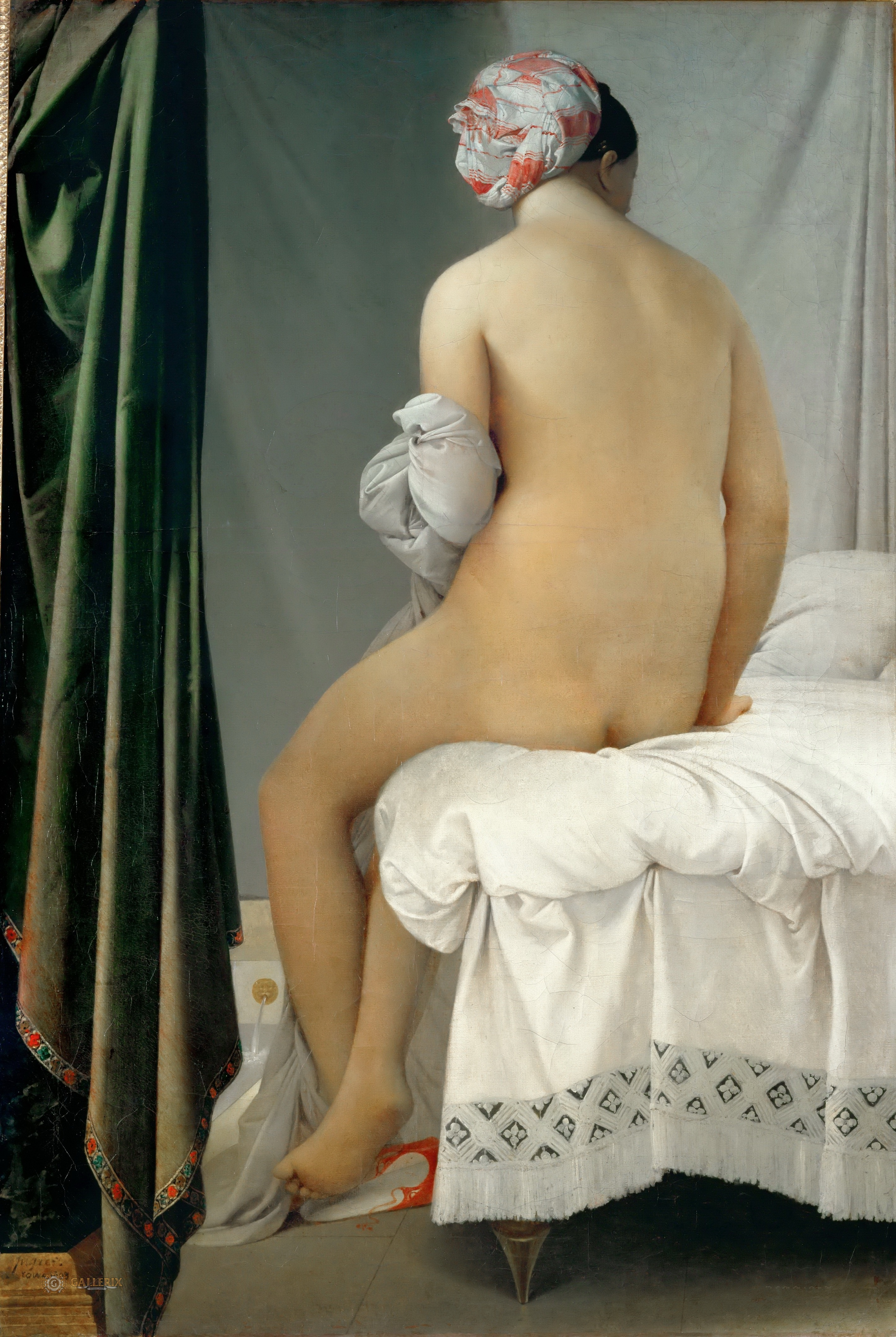
Jean-Auguste-Dominique Ingres, The Valpinçon Bather (1808, Louvre).

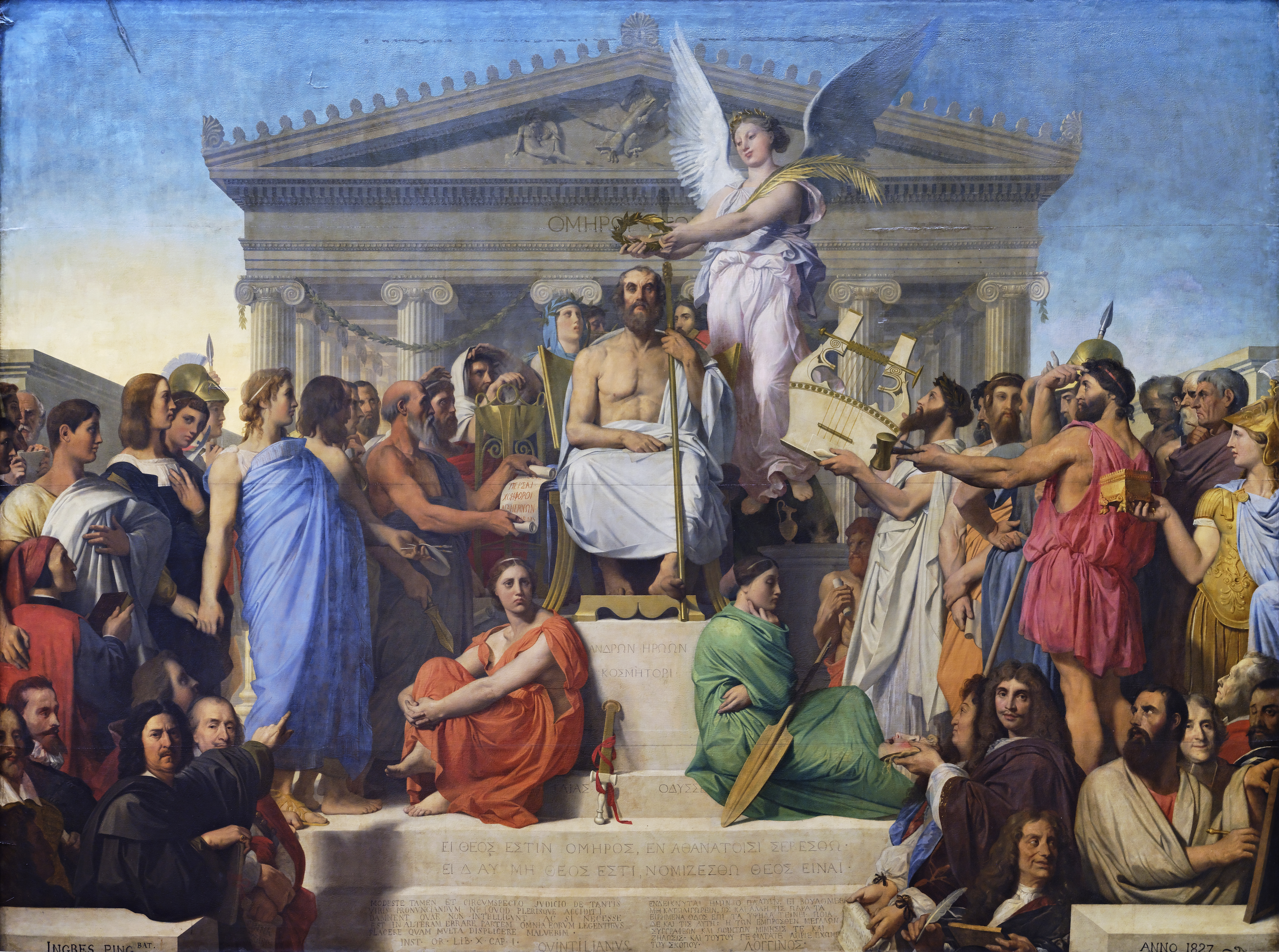
Jean-Auguste-Dominique Ingres, The Apotheosis of Homer (1827, Louvre).

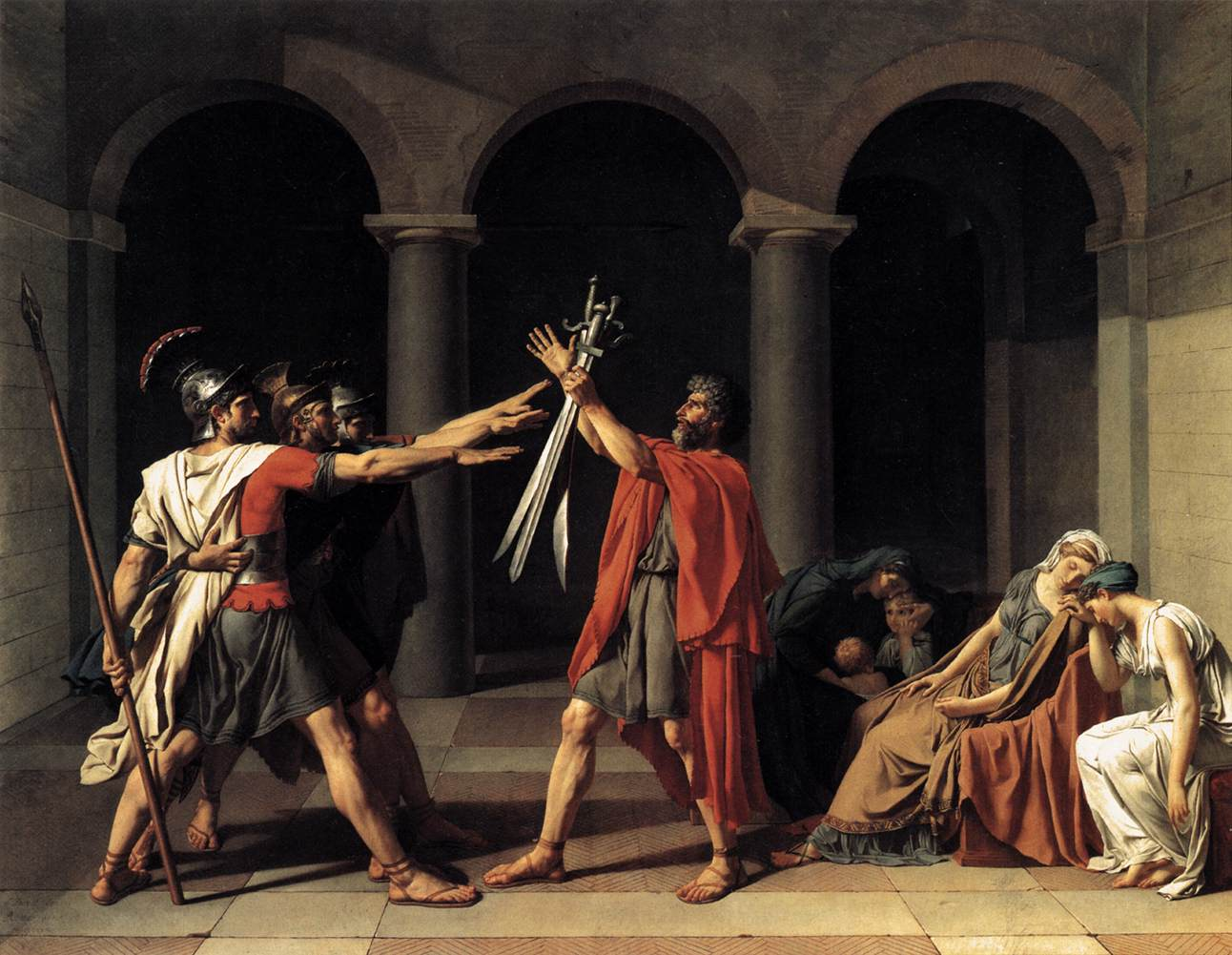
Jacques-Louis David, Oath of the Horatii (1784, Louvre).

By 1785, Rococo passed out of fashion, replaced first in architecture, and then in painting, by the severe order and seriousness of Neoclassical artists such as Jacques-Louis David (1748–1825) and François-André Vincent (1746–1816), whose monumental history paintings supported the ideals of the French Revolution (1789–1799). The French revolutionary government established Paris's Louvre art museum. David's successors were Antoine-Jean Gros (1771–1835) and Jean Auguste Dominique Ingres (1780–1867).

The preceding American Revolution (1765–1789) also had Neoclassical painters, such as Benjamin West (1738–1820), John Singleton Copley (1738–1815), and Rembrandt Peale (1778–1860). German neoclassical painters include Anton Raphael Mengs (1728–1779), arguably the first.

== 19th century ==
Both the Académie and École des Beaux-Arts were founded in 1816. By the mid-19th century, painting became more purely a means of personal expression, rather than limited to depicting representational and traditional scenes from religion, mythology, portraiture or history. Modern, abstract and conceptual art forms gained favor. Commercial galleries also became established and provided patronage.

=== Romanticism ===
Image Gallery (Click "Show" to view)
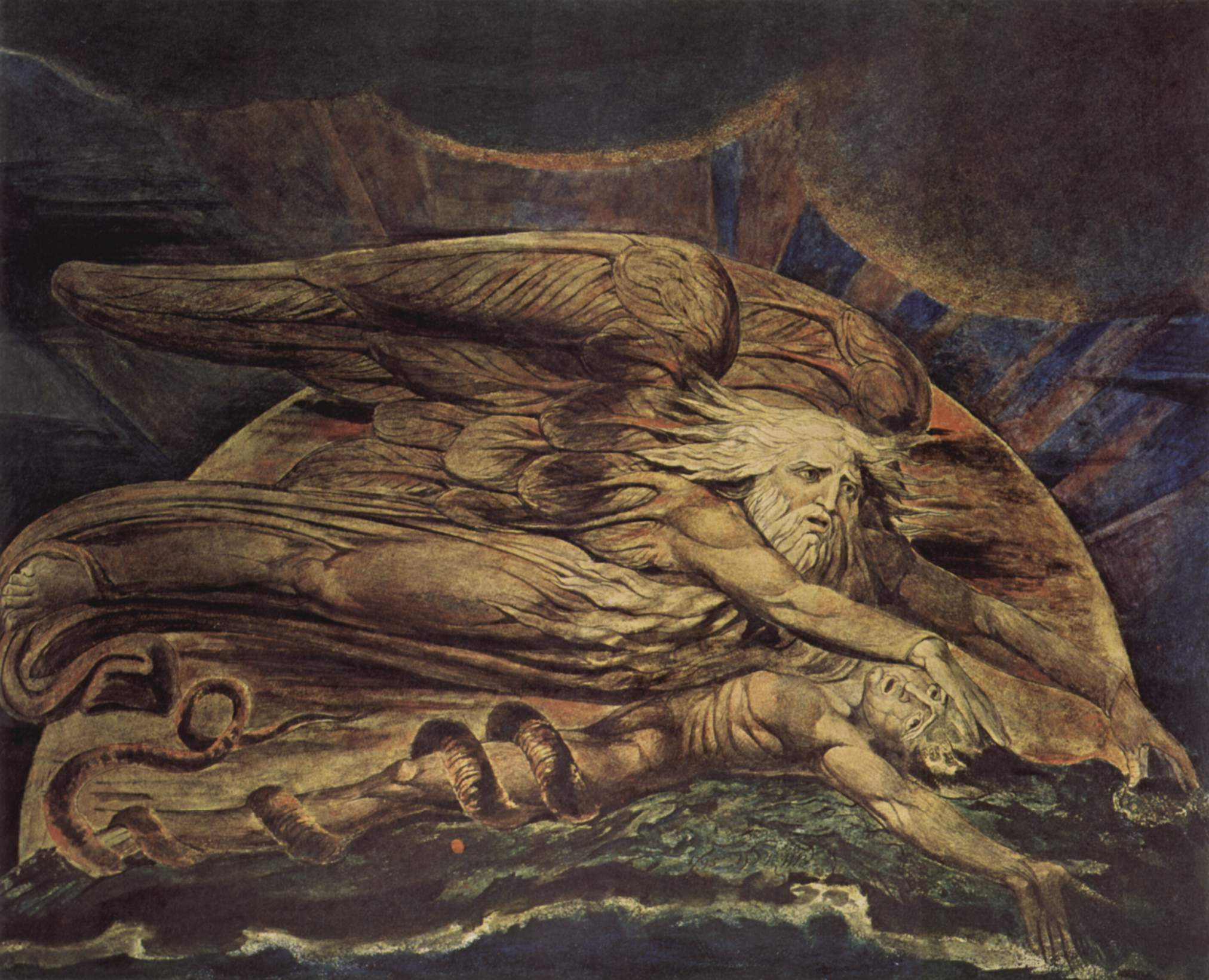
William Blake, Elohim Creating Adam (1795, Tate)

Karl Brullov, The Last Day of Pompeii (c. 1830, State Russian Museum.)

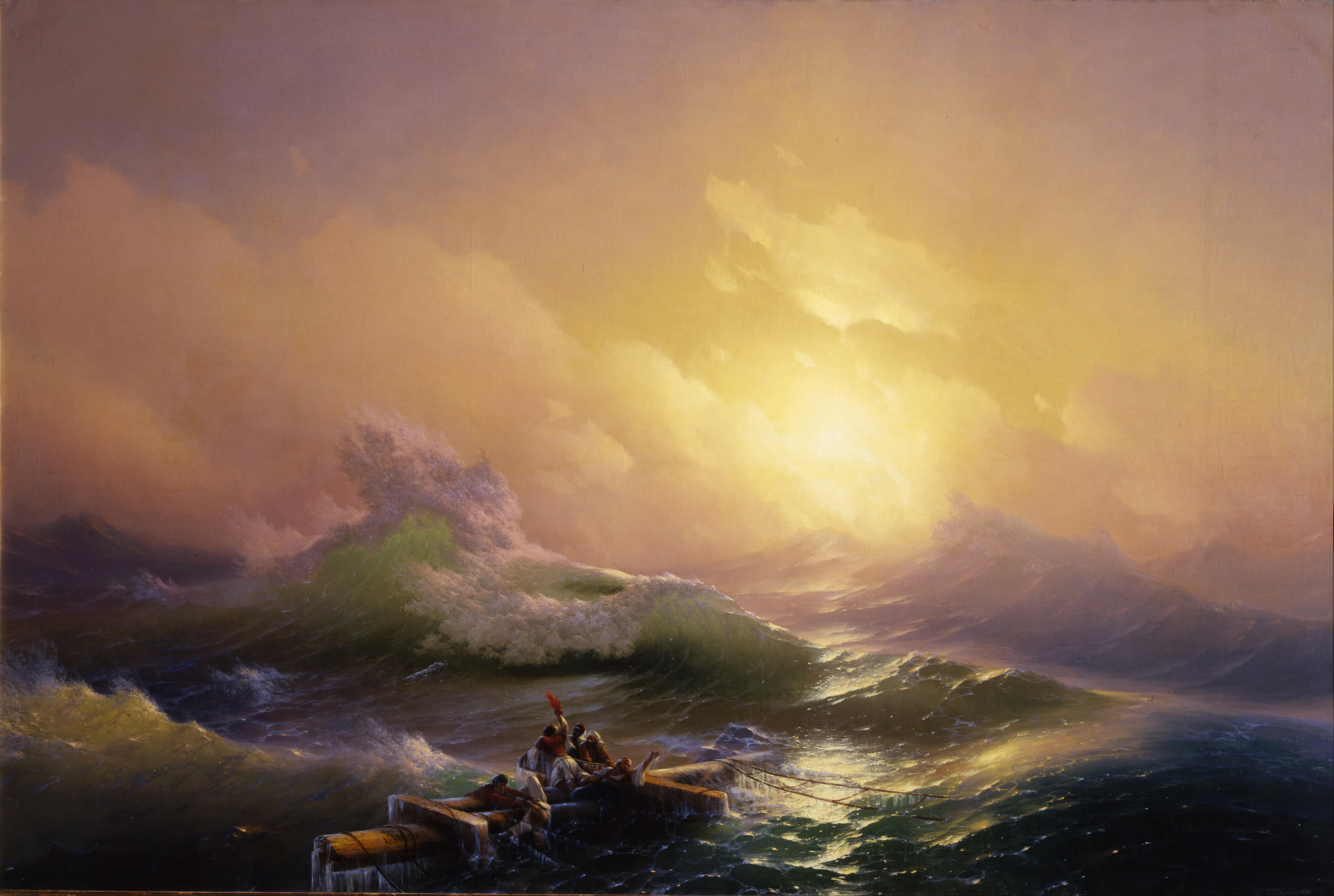
Ivan Aivazovsky, The Ninth Wave (1850, State Russian Museum)

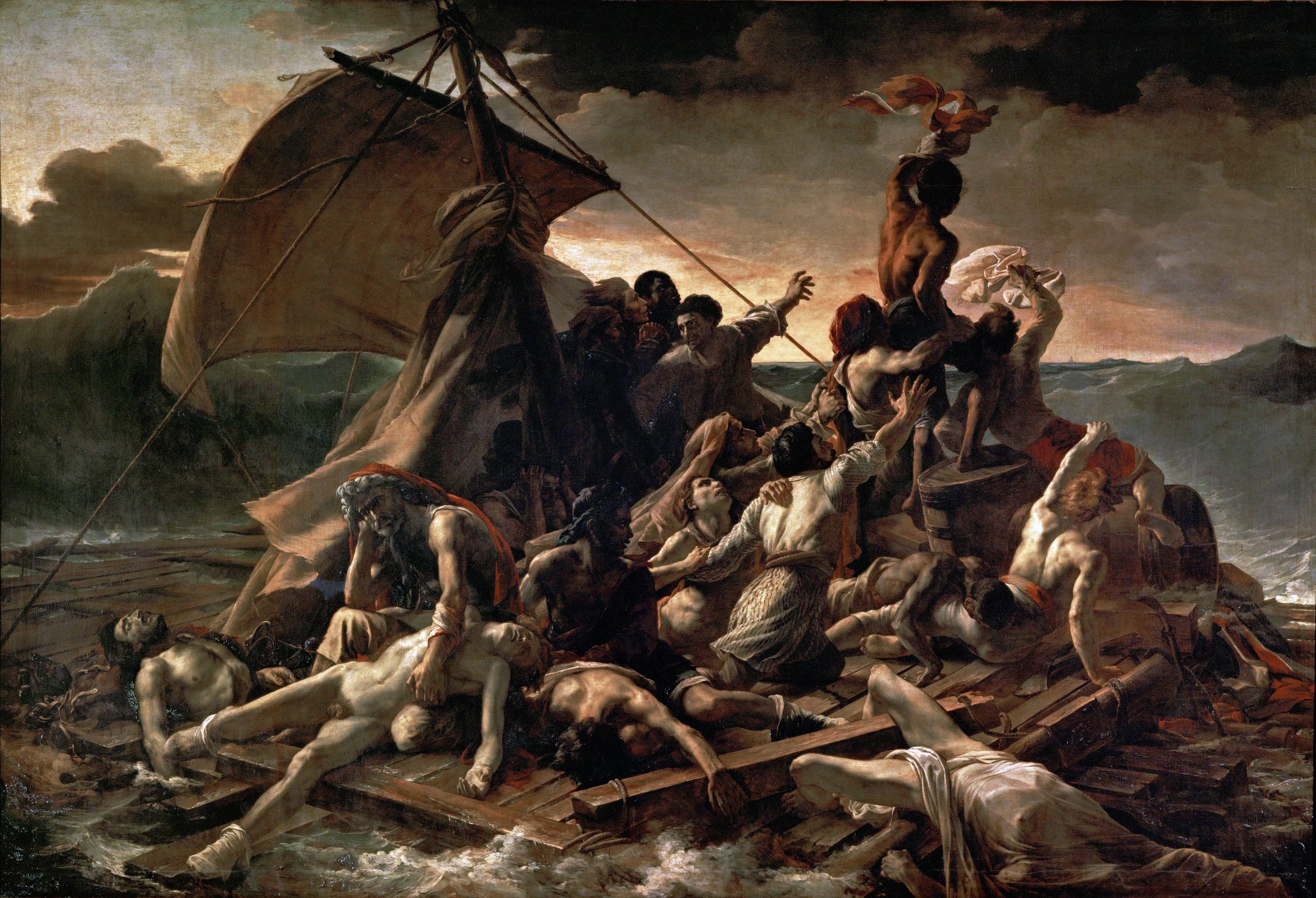
Théodore Géricault The Raft of the Medusa (1819, Louvre).

Eugène Delacroix, Liberty Leading the People (1830, Louvre).

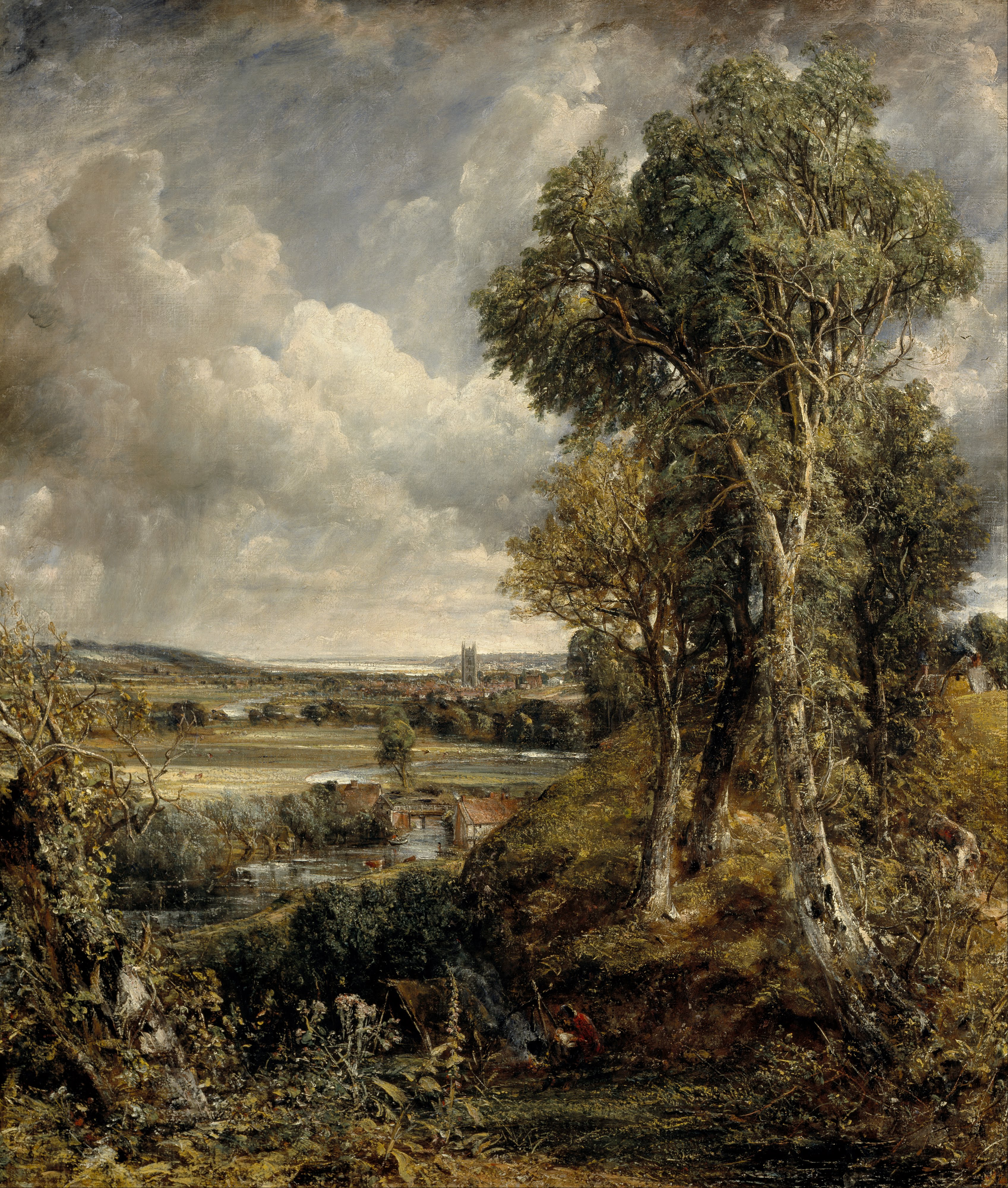
John Constable The Vale of Dedham (1828, Scottish National Gallery).

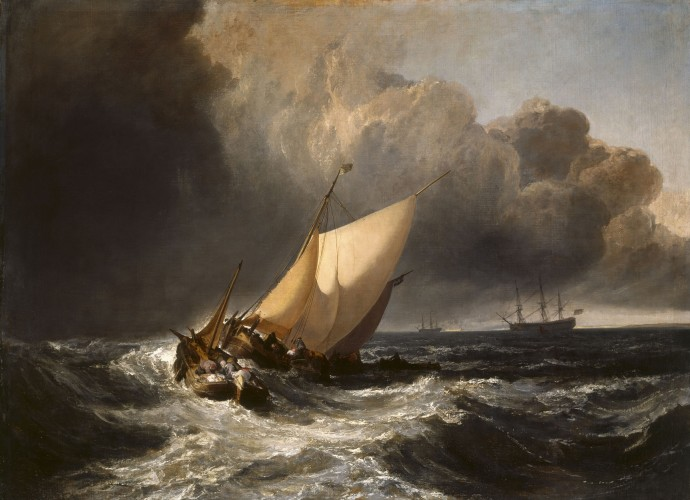
J. M. W. Turner, Dutch Boats in a Gale (1801, National Gallery).

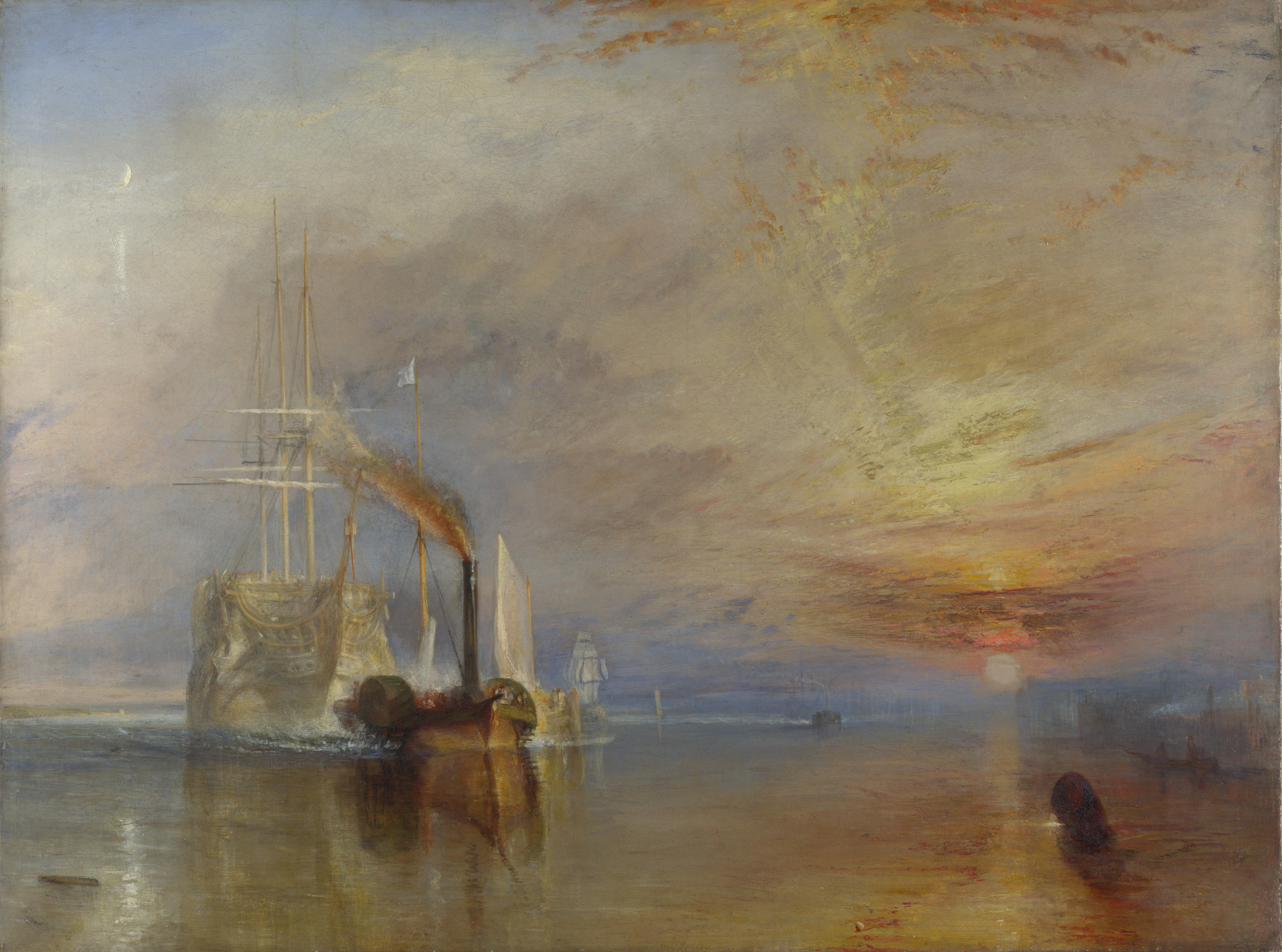
J. M. W. Turner, The Fighting Temeraire (1838, National Gallery).

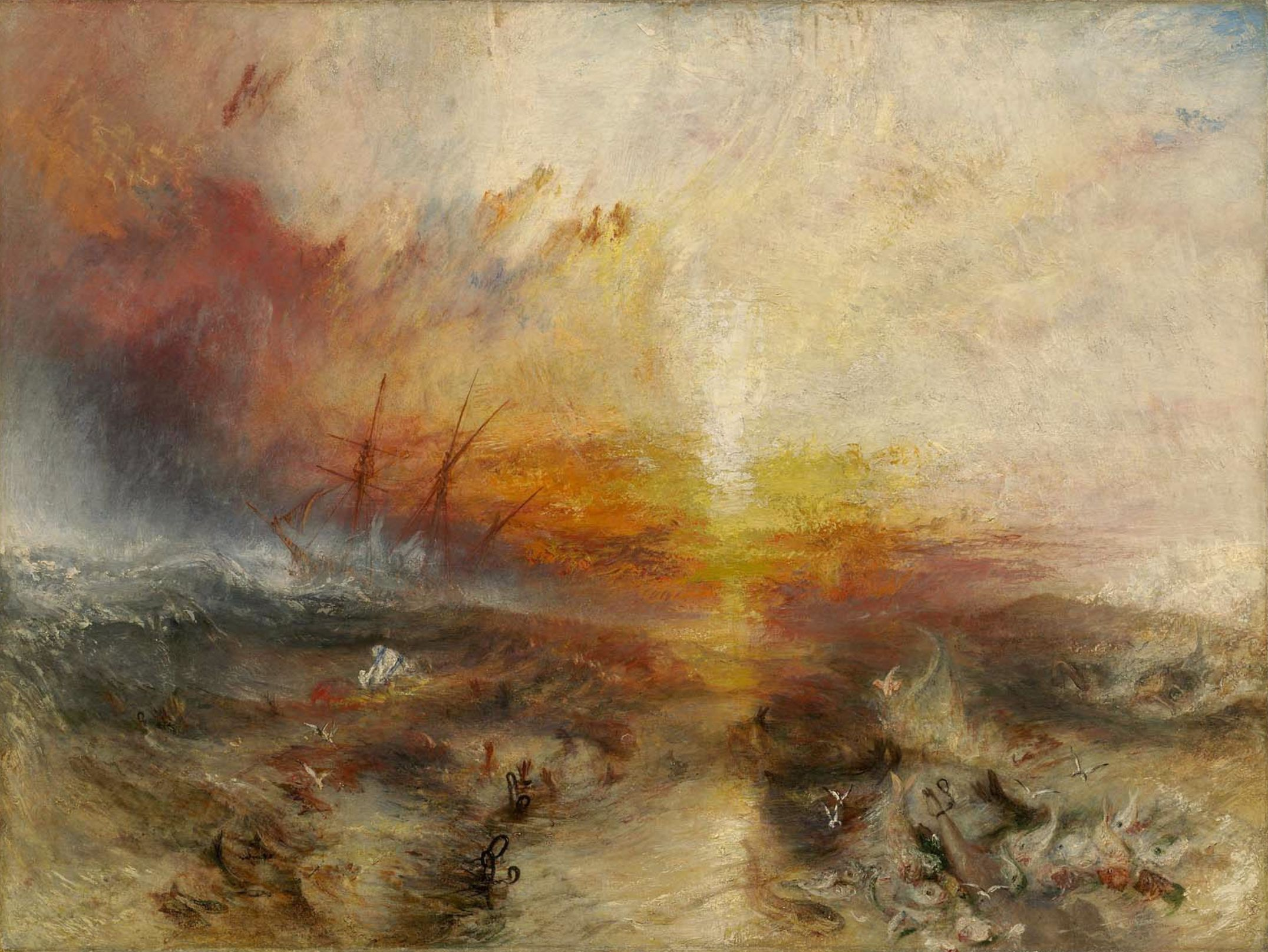
J. M. W. Turner, The Slave Ship (1840, Museum of Fine Arts, Boston).

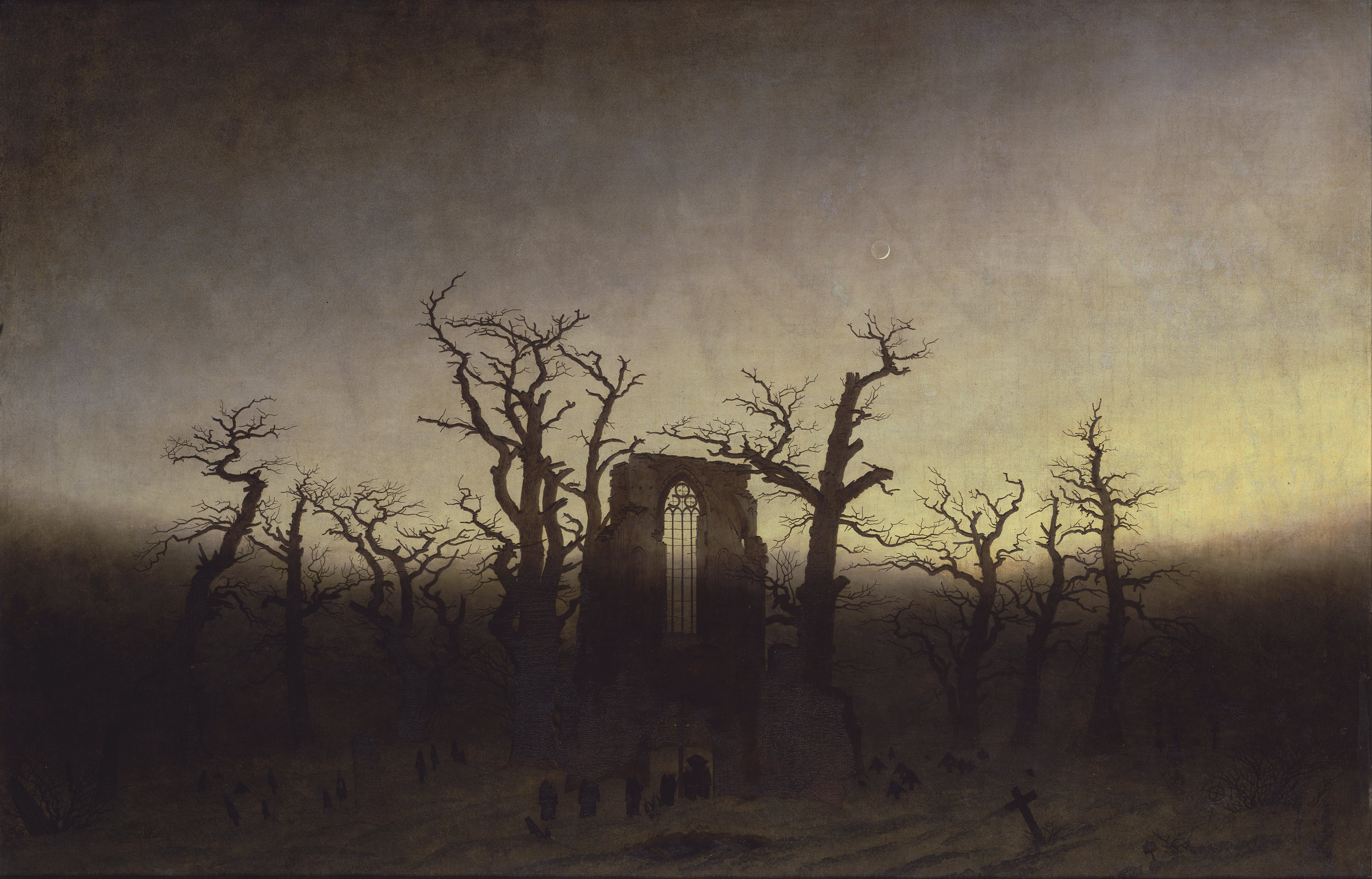
Caspar David Friedrich, The Abbey in the Oakwood (c. 1810, Alte Nationalgalerie).

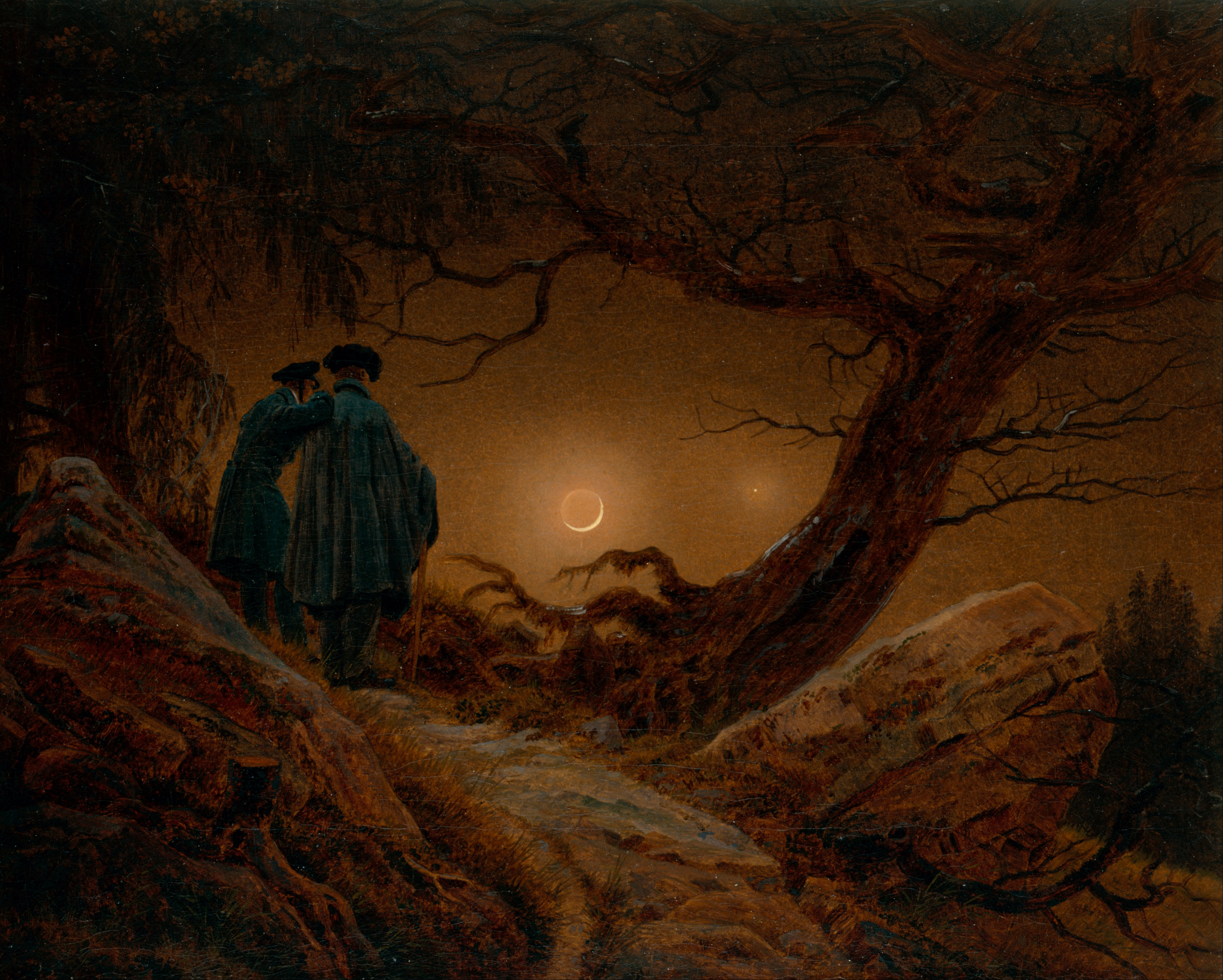
Two Men Contemplating the Moon (1820, Galerie Neue Meister)

Francisco Goya, The Third of May 1808 (1814, Museo del Prado).

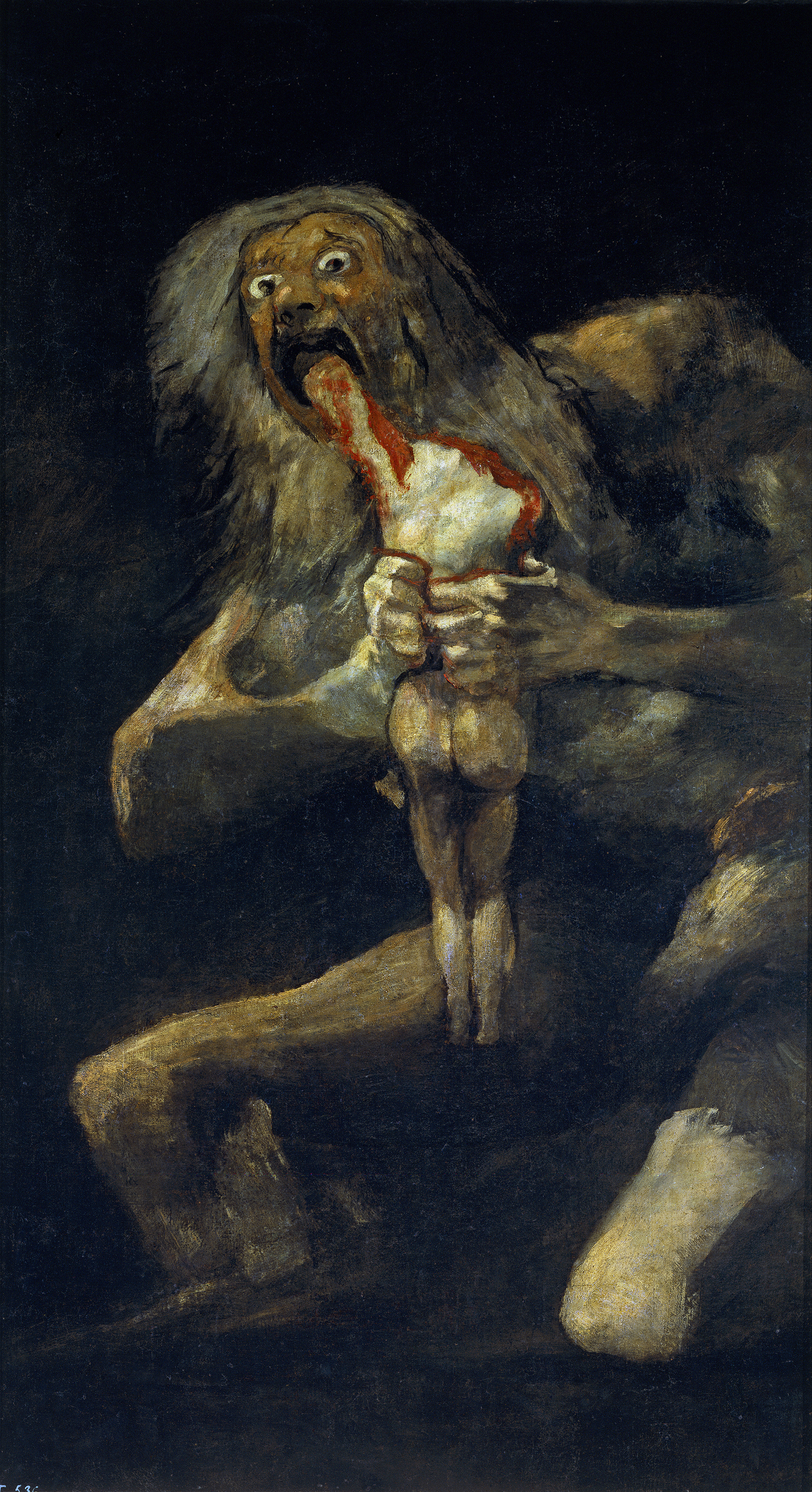
Francisco Goya, Saturn Devouring His Son (c. 1820, Museo del Prado).

James McNeill Whistler, Whistler's Mother (1871, Musée d'Orsay).

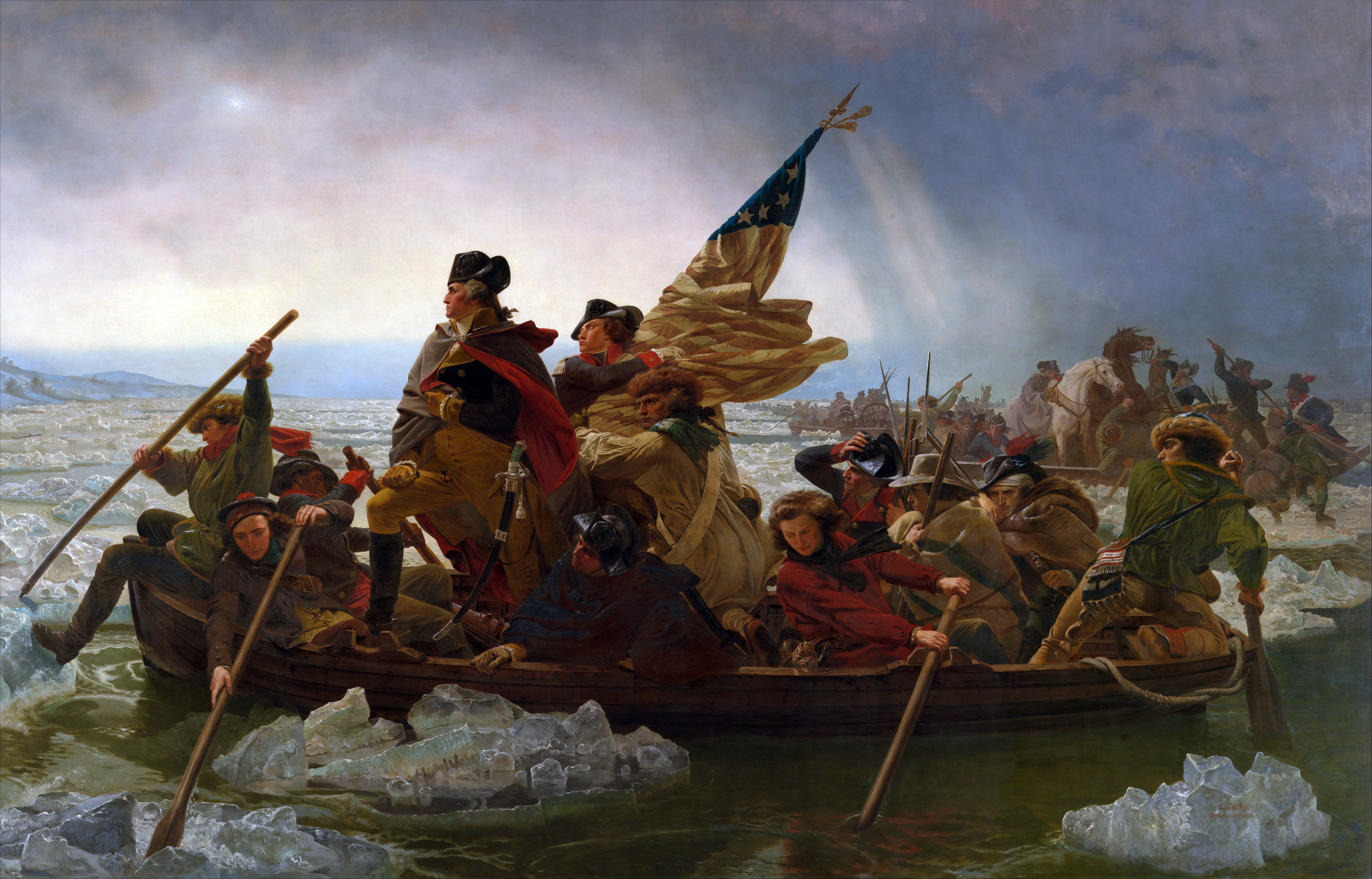
Emanuel Leutze, Washington Crossing the Delaware (1851, Metropolitan Museum of Art).

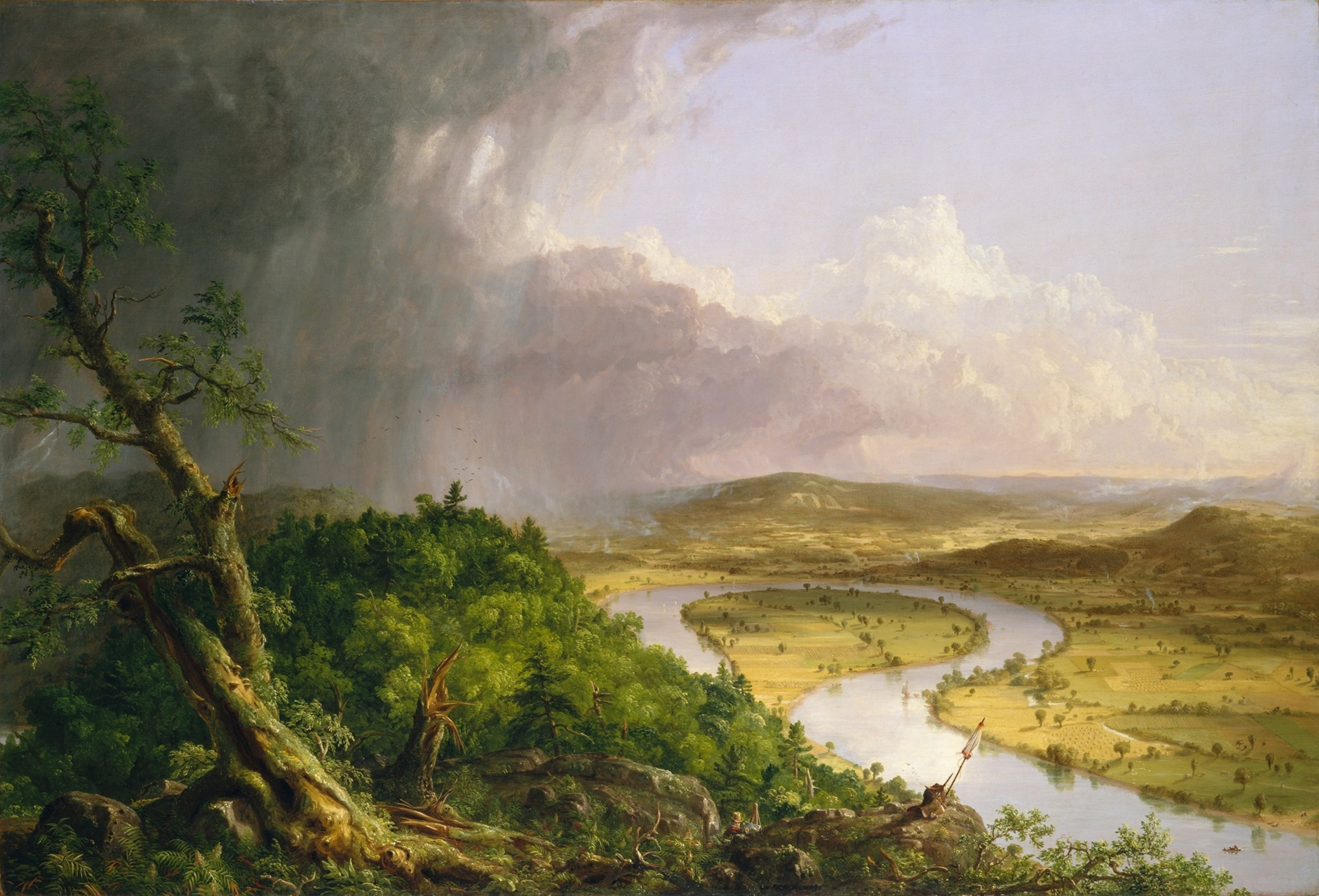
Thomas Cole, The Oxbow (The Connecticut River near Northampton) (Hudson River School, 1836, Metropolitan Museum of Art).

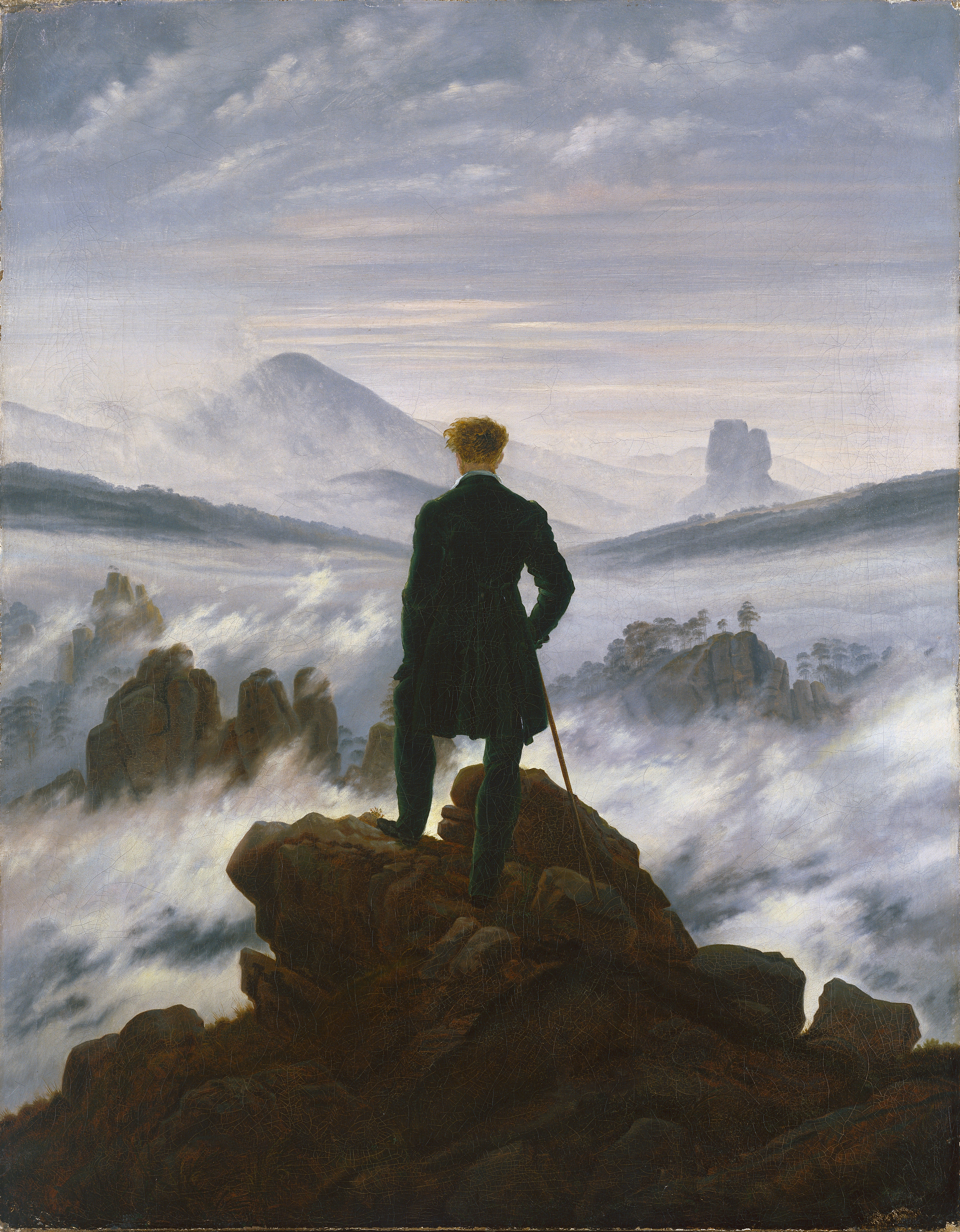
Caspar David Friedrich, Wanderer Above the Sea of Fog (c. 1818, Hamburger Kunsthalle).

Ingres' work contains the sensuality, but none of the spontaneity, characterizing Romanticism, which made picturesque landscapes a major genre, painting for self-expression and "art for art's sake", including Russians Karl Brullov (1799–1852) and marine artist Ivan Aivazovsky (1817–1900), Englishmen John Constable (1776–1837) and marine and landscape artist J. M. W. Turner (1775–1851), Frenchmen Eugène Delacroix (1798–1863) and Théodore Géricault (1791–1824), Germans Caspar David Friedrich (1774–1840) and Philipp Otto Runge (1777–1810), and Spaniard Francisco de Goya (1684–1721), whose late work demonstrates Romantic interest in the irrational.

Romantic painters influenced the French decadent movement, the English Pre-Raphaelite Brotherhood's combination of devotion to nature and medieval nostalgia, fantastic artist John Martin (1789–1854), Victorian fairy painters like Richard Dadd (1817–1886), plus Americans like Aesthetic movement tonalist James Abbott McNeill Whistler (1834–1903).

German Biedermeier (1815–1848) romantic painters also include Ferdinand Georg Waldmüller (1793–1865) and Carl Spitzweg (1808–1885). German romanticism includes philosophers like Theory of Colours (1810) author and polymath Johann Wolfgang von Goethe (1749–1832), Schlegel brothers Karl (1772–1829) and August (1767–1845), idealists like Critique of Judgment (1790) author Immanuel Kant (1724–1804), F. W. J. Schelling (1775–1854), and G. W. F. Hegel (1770–1831), called the "father of art history" by Ernst Gombrich (1909–2001).

Düsseldorf School painters like Nazarene Friedrich Wilhelm Schadow (1789–1862) and Karl Friedrich Lessing (1808–1880) influenced German-American Emanuel Leutze (1816–1868), and Hudson River School and Luminist landscape painters, including Thomas Cole (1801–1848), Frederic Edwin Church (1826–1900), Albert Bierstadt (1830–1902), Thomas Moran (1837–1926), and John Frederick Kensett (1816–1872).

=== Realism ===
Image Gallery (Click "Show" to view)
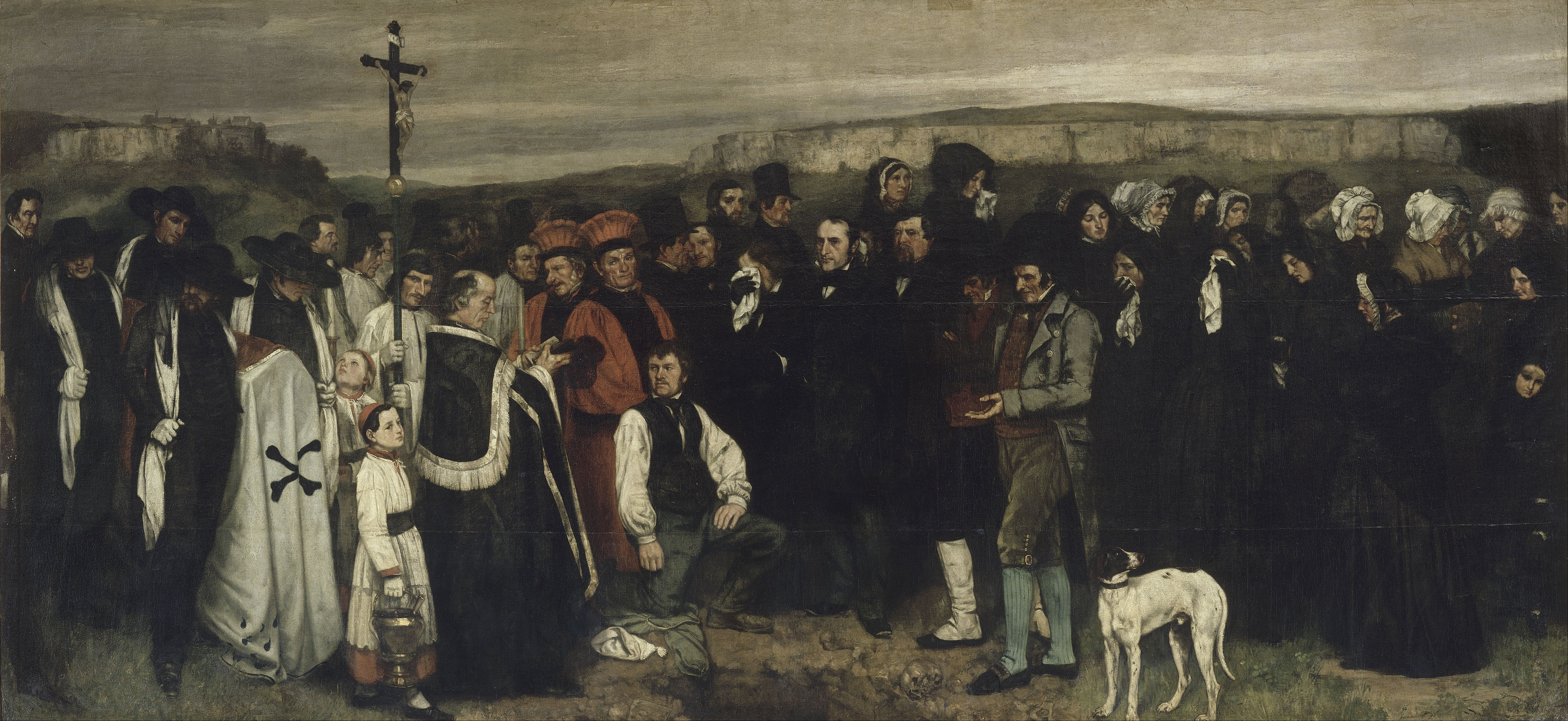
Gustave Courbet, A Burial at Ornans (c. 1850, Musée d'Orsay)

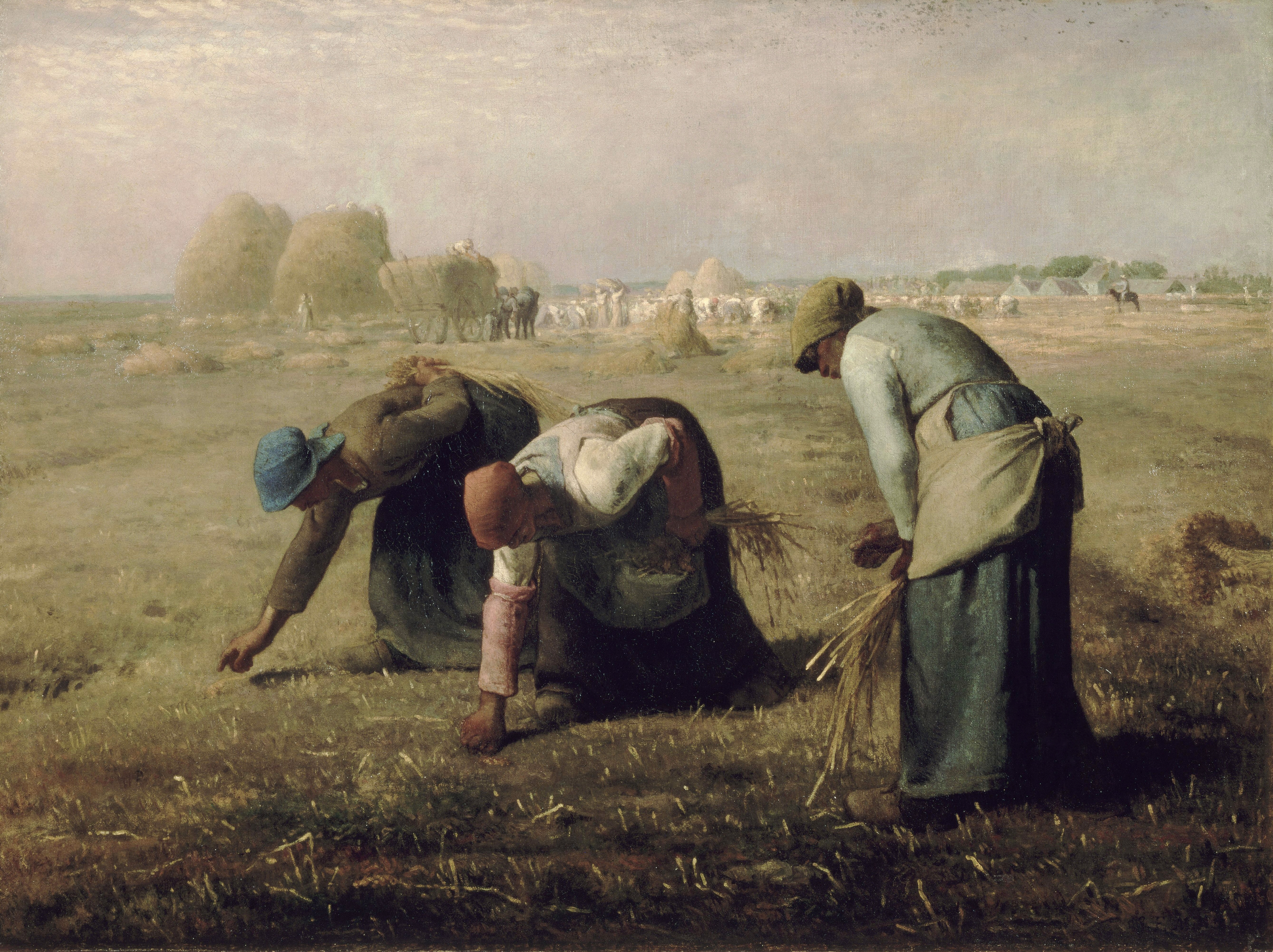
Jean-François Millet, The Gleaners (1857, Musée d'Orsay)

Camille Corot, Forest of Fontainebleau (1834, National Gallery of Art).

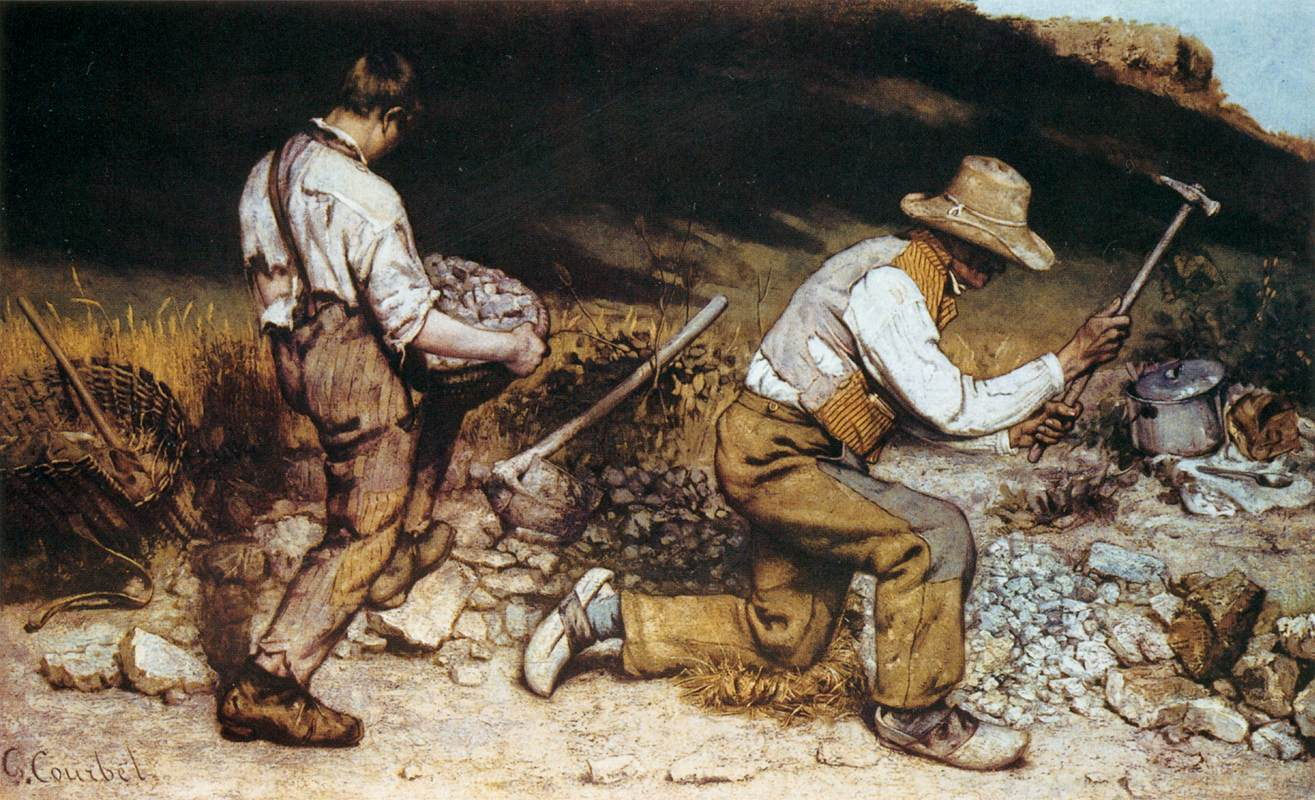
Gustave Courbet, The Stone Breakers (1849, destroyed during World War II).

Gustave Courbet (1819–1877) led the turn towards Realism at mid-century, with unidealized paintings of common people, offending viewers accustomed to the conventional subjects and licked finish of academic art, but inspiring many younger artists.

The leading Barbizon School painter Jean-François Millet (1814–1875) painted landscapes and scenes of peasant life. Others include Théodore Rousseau (1812–1867), Charles-François Daubigny (1817–1878), Jules Dupré (1811–1889), Constant Troyon (1810–1865), Charles Jacque (1813–1894), and Narcisse Virgilio Díaz (1807–1876). Barbizon School associate Camille Corot (1796–1875) painted vigorous and precise landscapes, most notably of Fontainebleau Forest.

In Germany, the Munich school painters, of its Academy of Fine Arts, were influenced by Courbet, such as Franz Defregger (1835–1921), Wilhelm Leibl (1844–1900), Franz von Lenbach (1836–1904), and Wilhelm Trübner (1851–1917), painting naturalistic scenes utilizing chiaroscuro. The Munich School had a wide influence across Western painting, including Americans, such as Frank Duveneck (1848–1919); and Greeks, such as Nikiforos Lytras (1832–1904) and Nikolaos Gyzis (1842–1901).

Other realists include Belgian Alfred Stevens (1823–1906) and Russian Ilya Repin (1844–1930). Notable Russian painting repositories include the State Russian Museum and Hermitage Museum.

==== American realism ====
Image Gallery (Click "Show" to view)
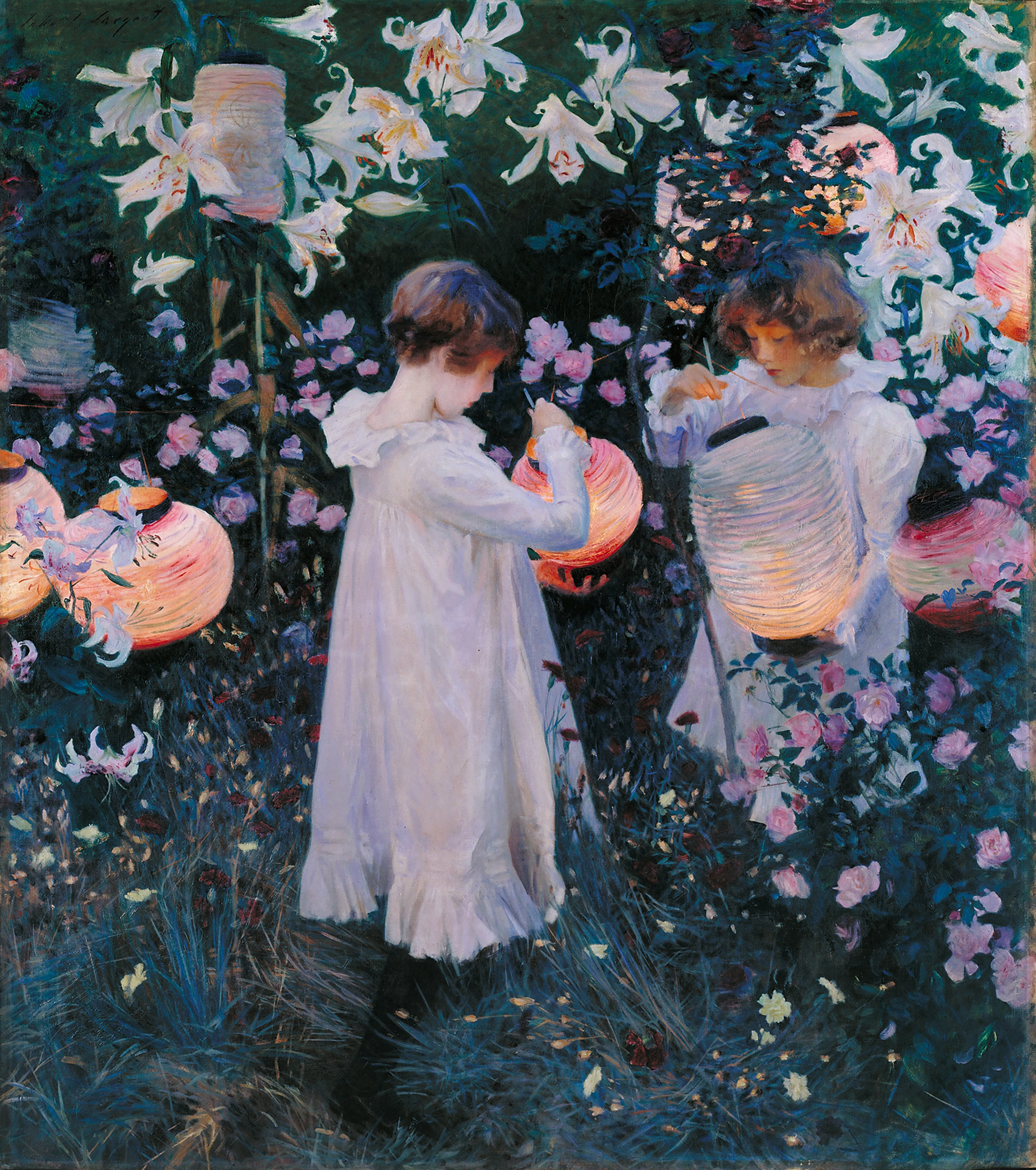
John Singer Sargent, Carnation, Lily, Lily, Rose (1885, Tate Britain).

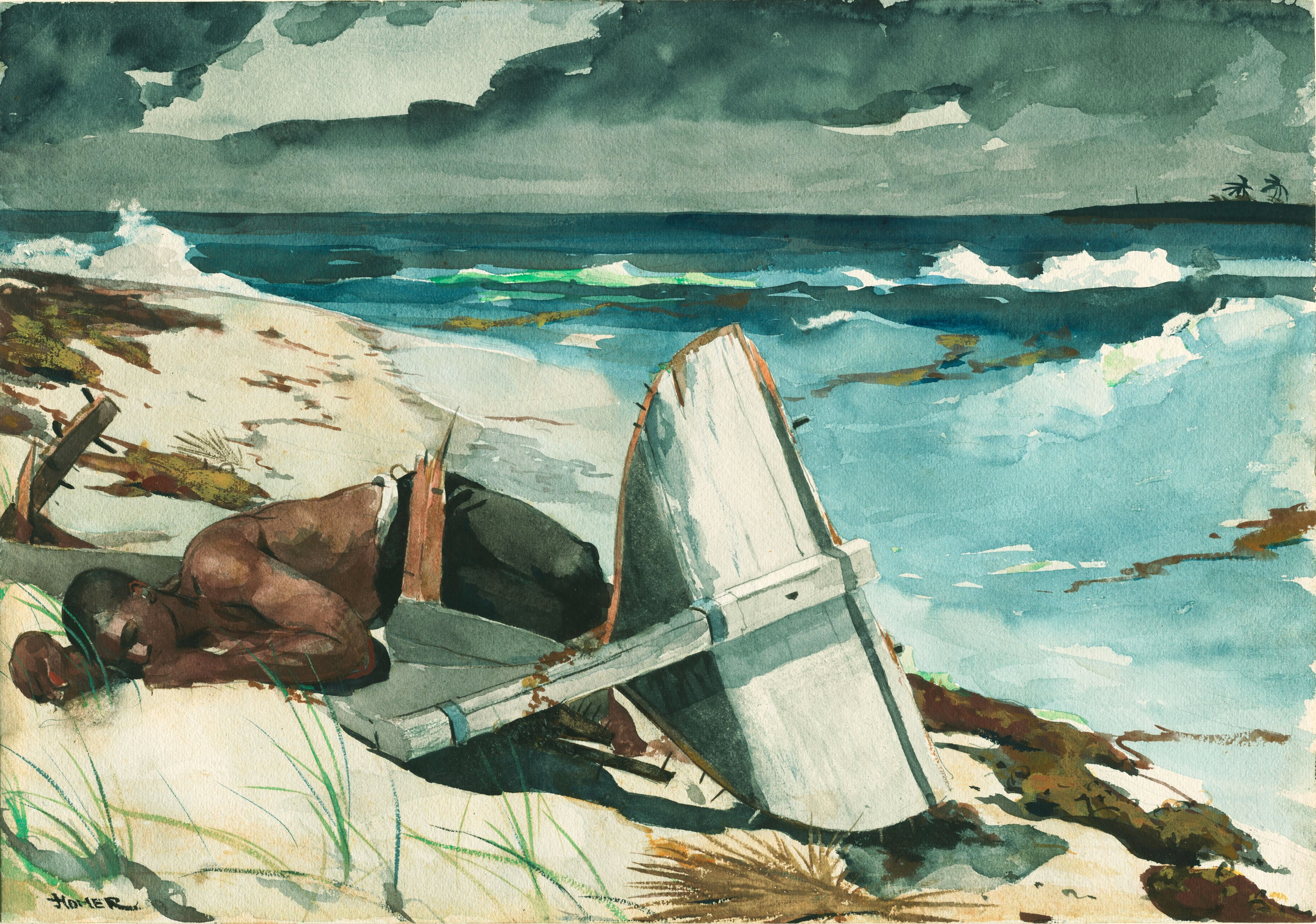
Winslow Homer, After the Hurricane, Bahamas (1899, Art Institute of Chicago).

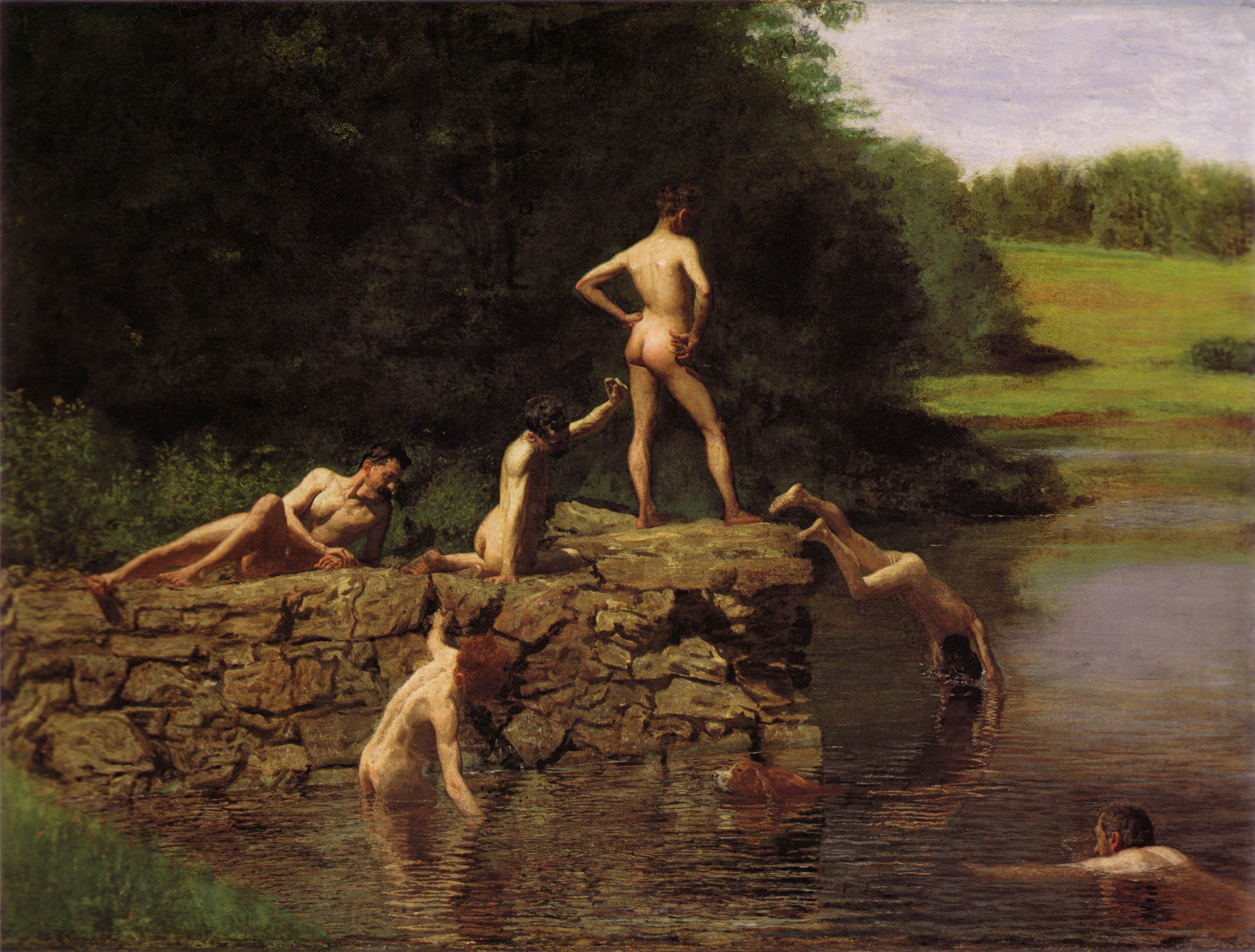
Thomas Eakins, Swimming (1885, Amon Carter Museum of American Art).

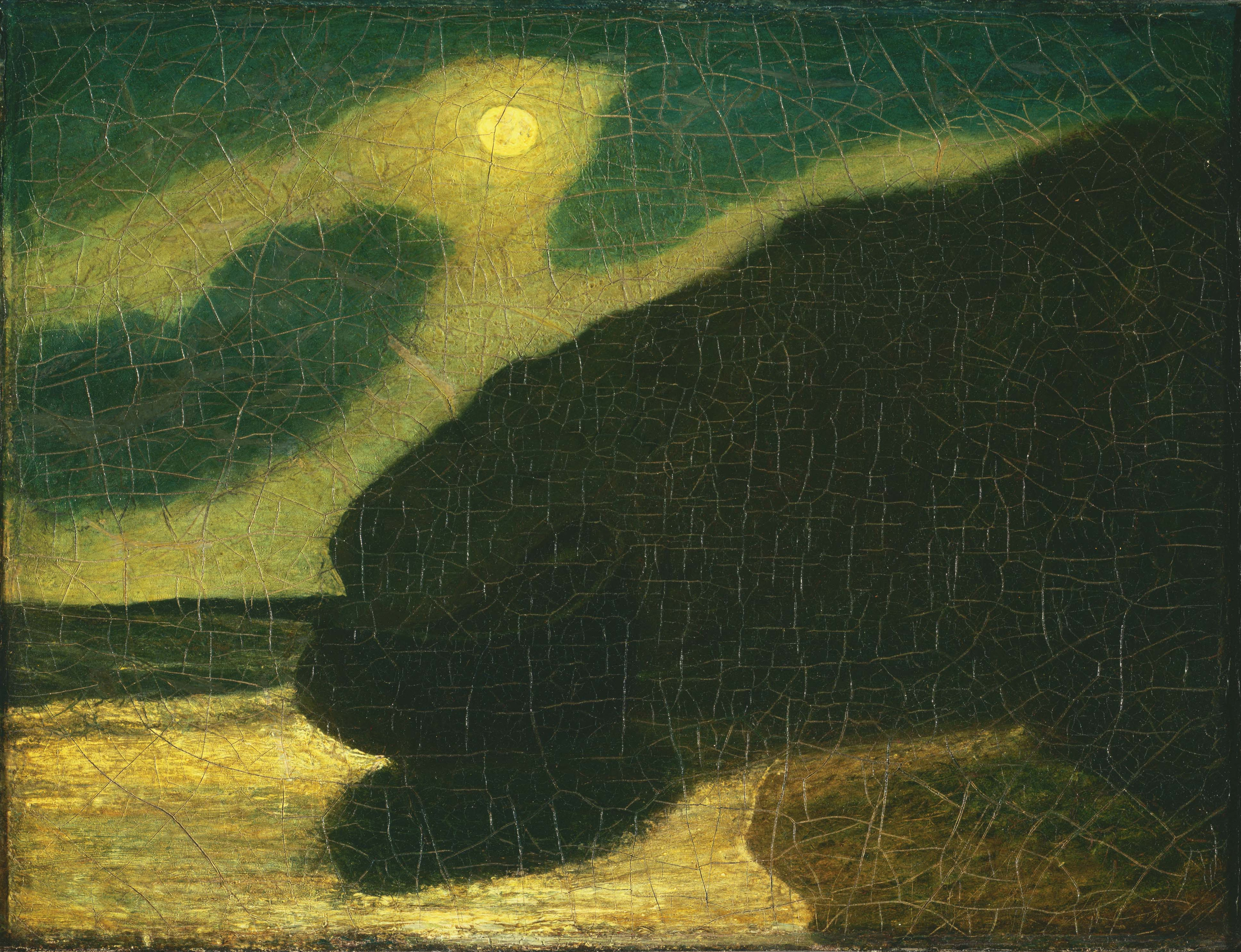
Albert Pinkham Ryder, Moonlit Cove (1880, The Phillips Collection).

American realism was deeply invested in the solidity of natural forms, including portrait and landscape painter John Singer Sargent (1856–1925), landscape and seascape painter Winslow Homer (1836–1910), Thomas Eakins (1775–1851), and the Ashcan School. Albert Pinkham Ryder (1847–1917) and Ralph Albert Blakelock (1847–1917) painted nocturnes and visionary landscapes.

=== Impressionism ===
Image Gallery (Click "Show" to view)
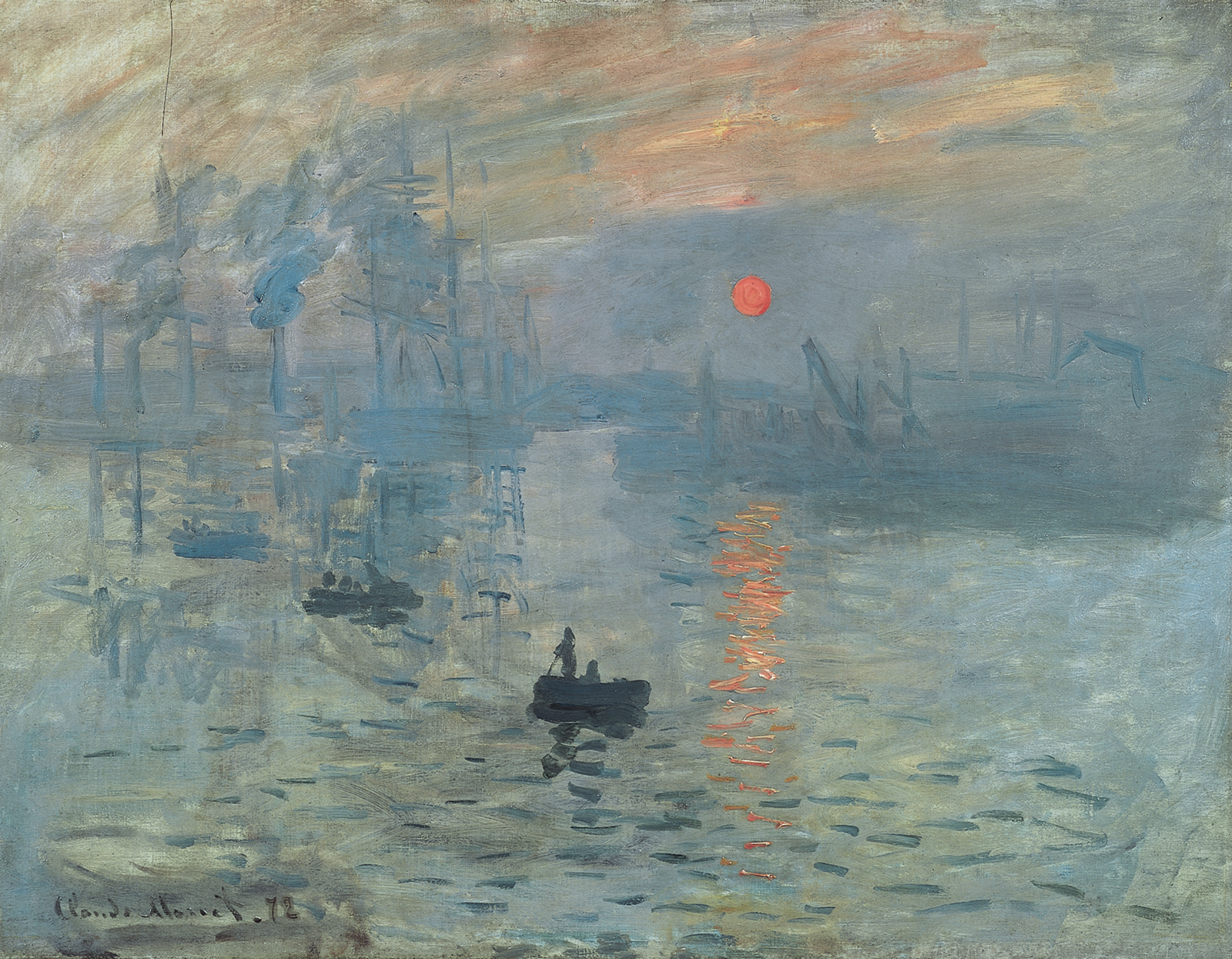
Claude Monet, Impression, Sunrise (1872, Musée Marmottan Monet).

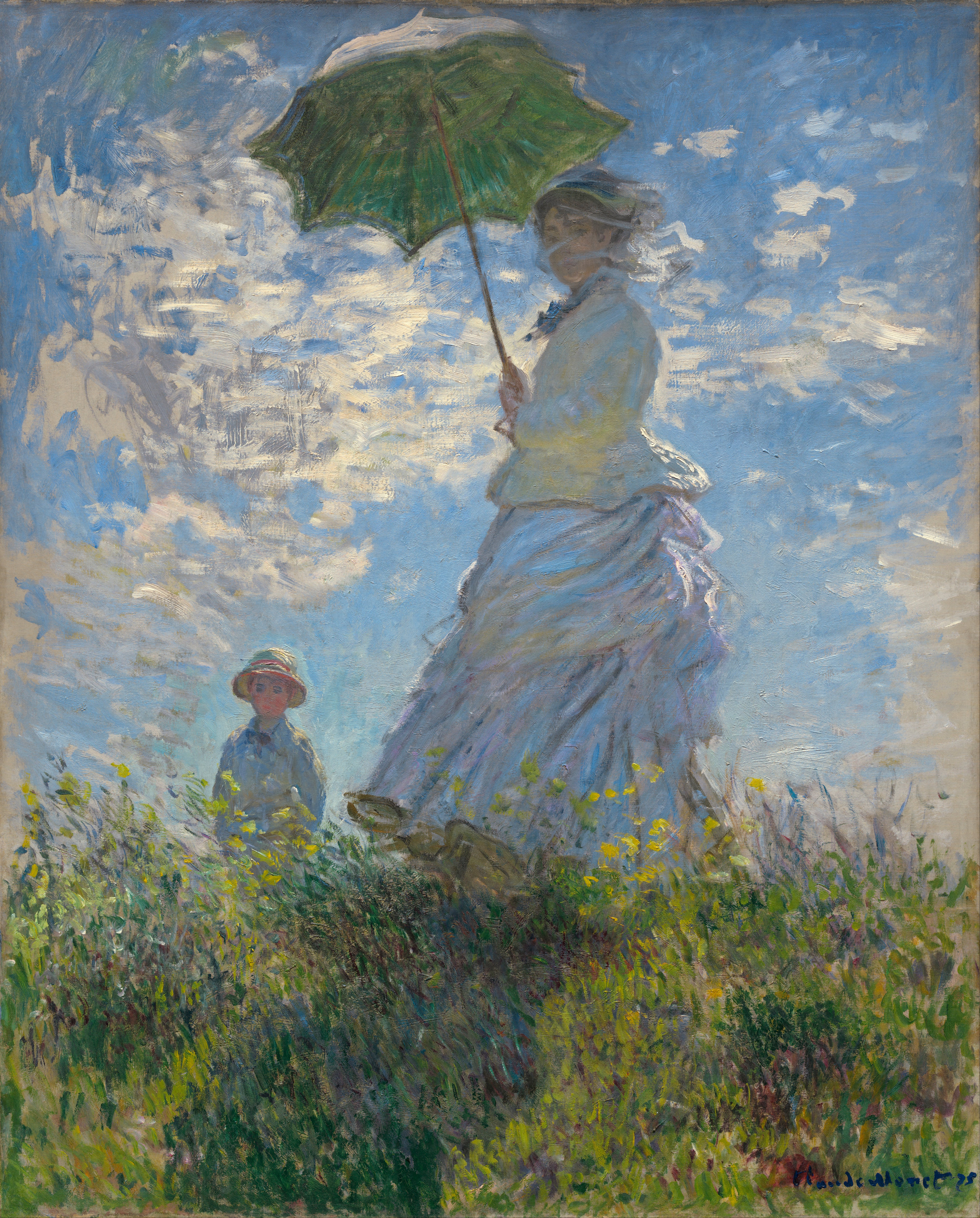
Claude Monet, Woman with a Parasol – Madame Monet and Her Son (1875, National Gallery of Art).

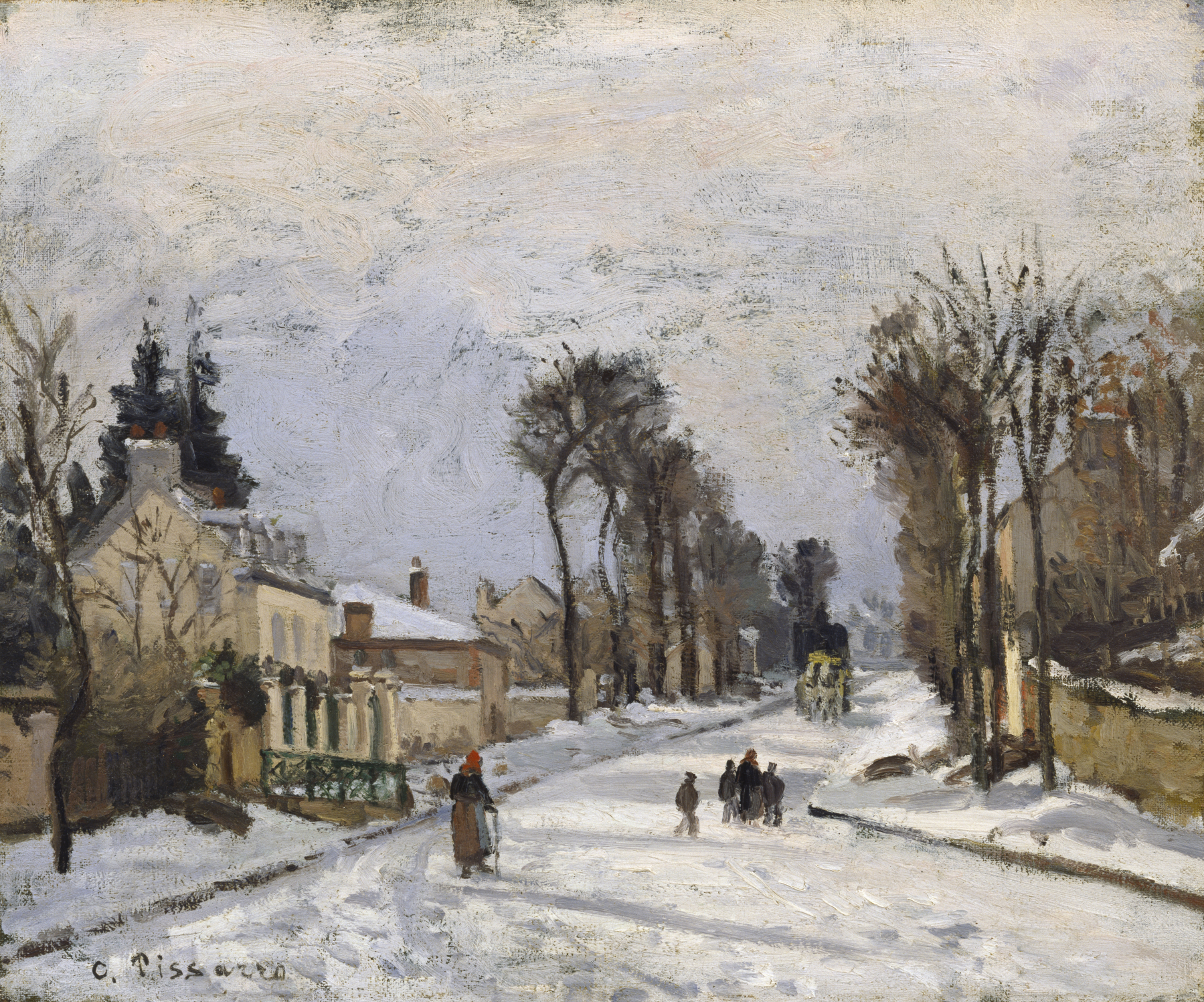
Camille Pissarro, Road to Versailles at Louveciennes (1869, Walters Art Museum).

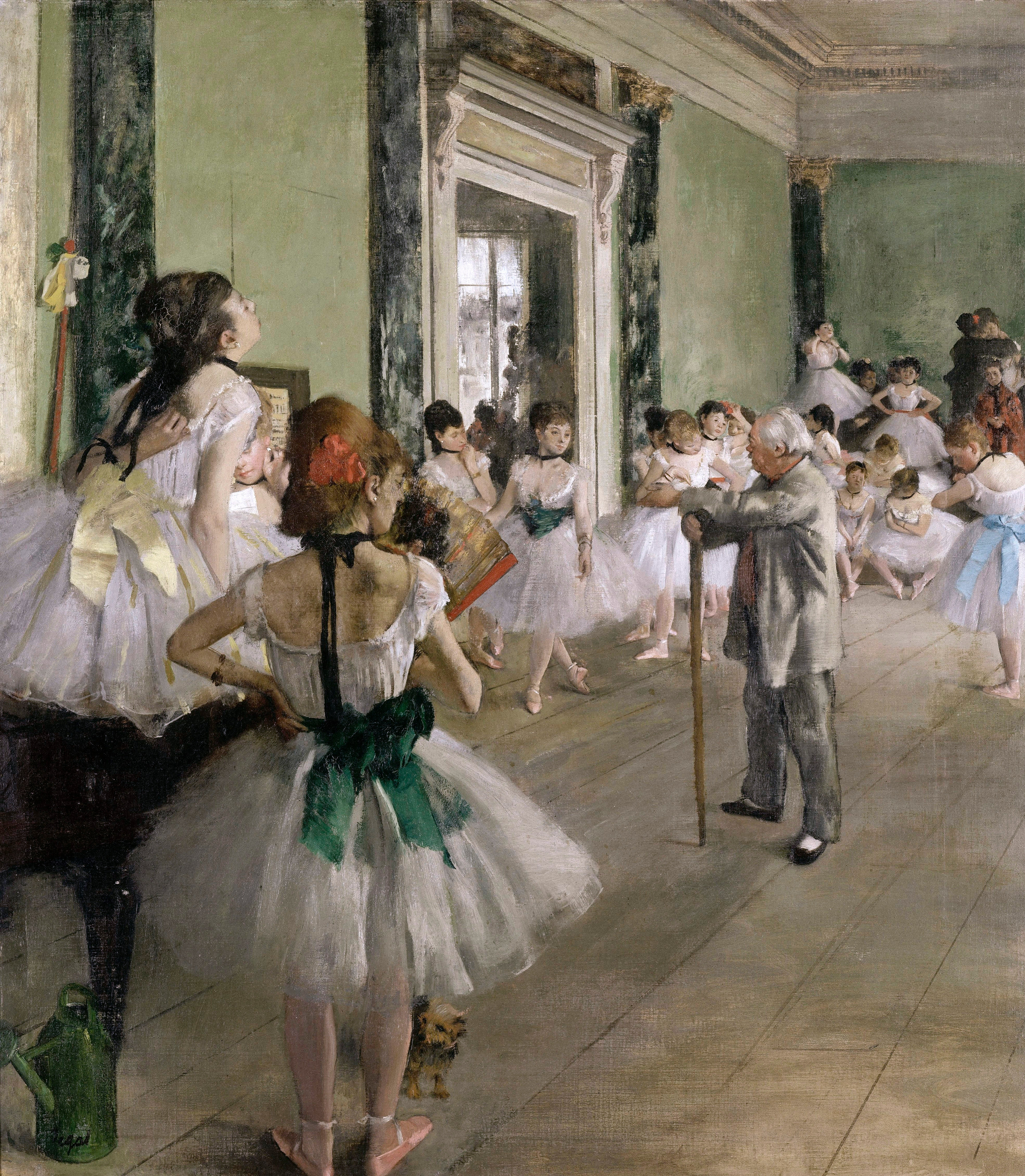
Edgar Degas, The Ballet Class (c. 1875, Musée d'Orsay).

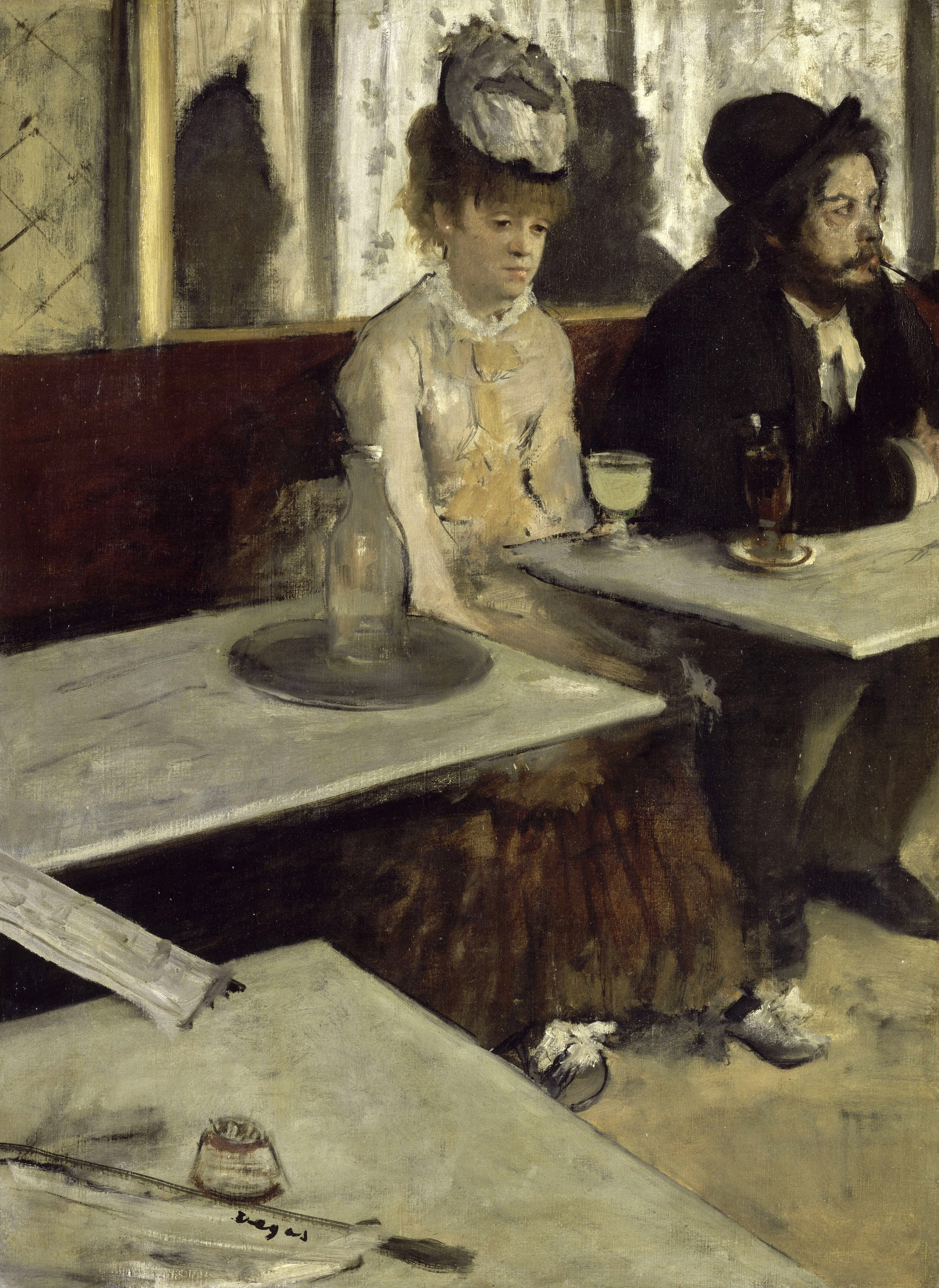
Edgar Degas, In a café (c. 1875, Musée d'Orsay). Lady drinking absinthe.

Pierre-Auguste Renoir, Dance at Le moulin de la Galette (1876, Musée d'Orsay).

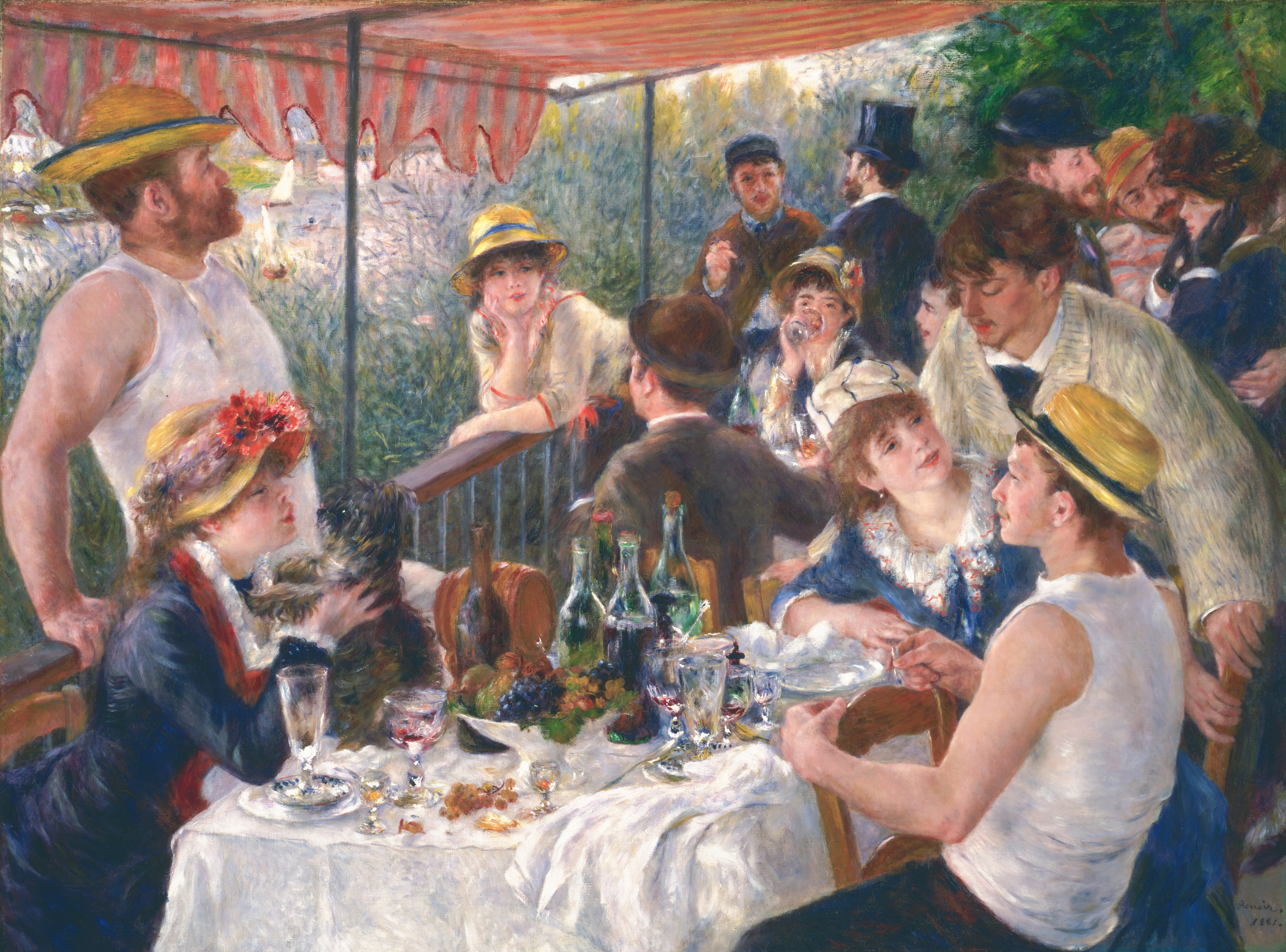
Pierre-Auguste Renoir, Luncheon of the Boating Party (c. 1881, The Phillips Collection).

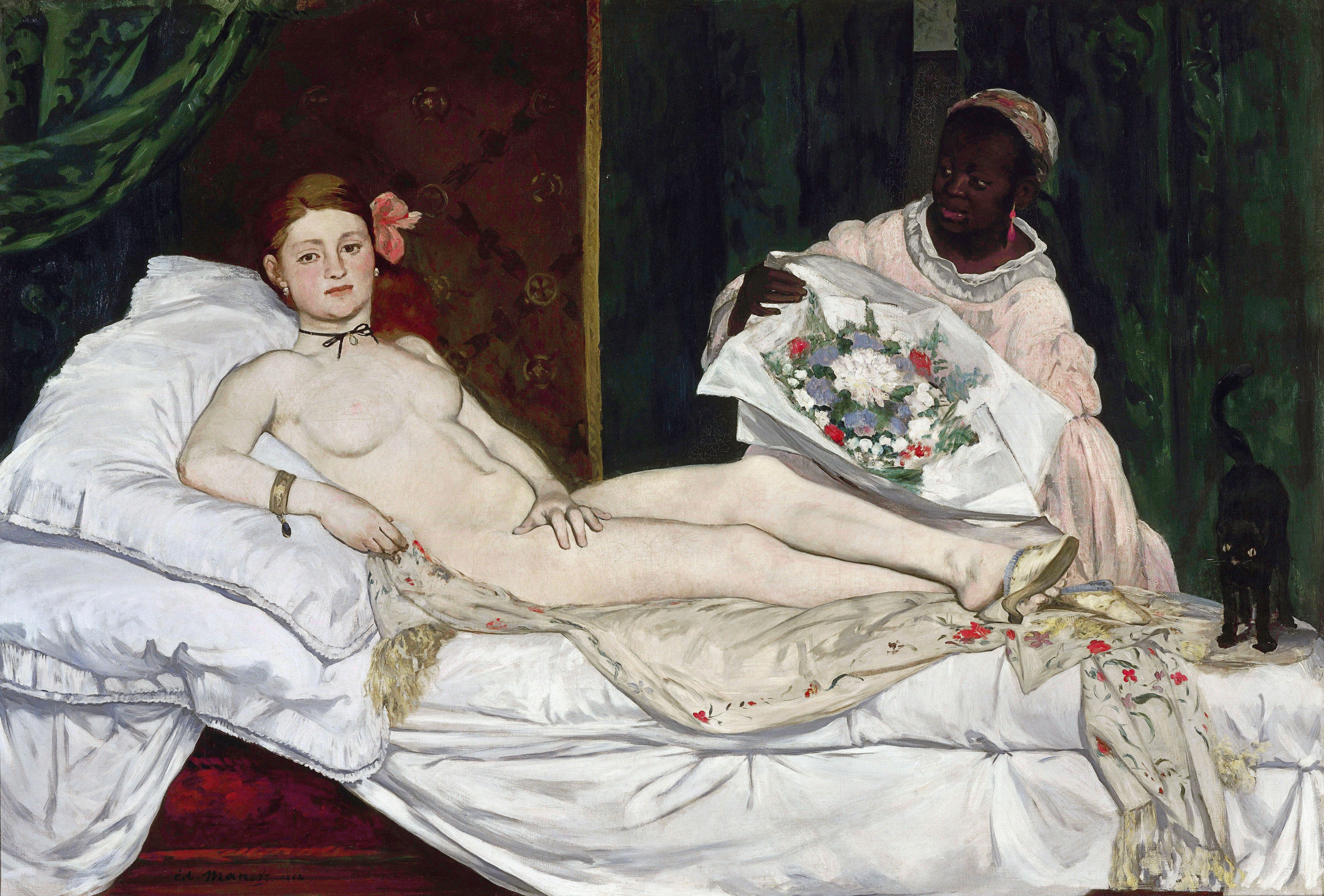
Édouard Manet, Olympia (1863, Musée d'Orsay).

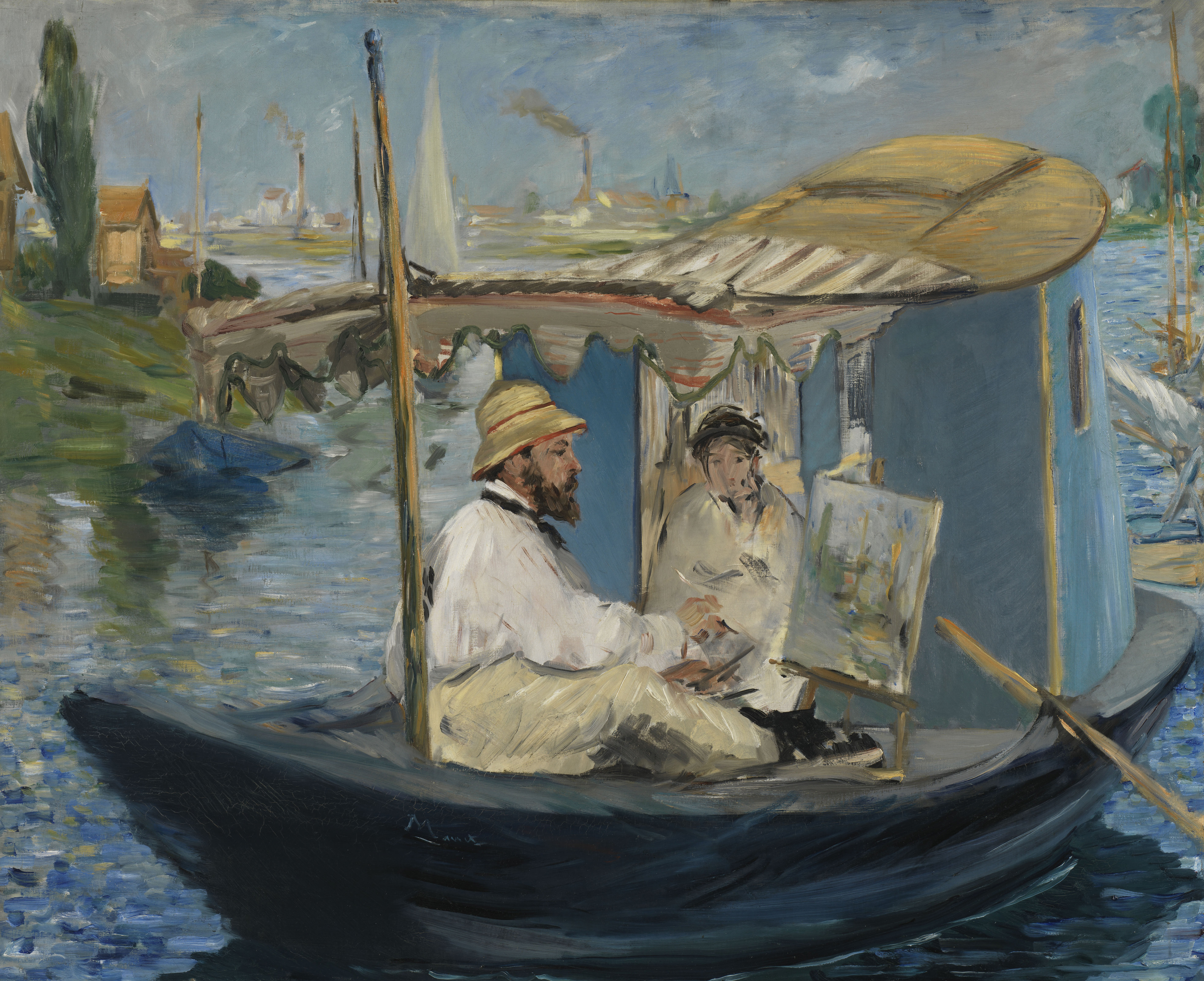
Édouard Manet, Claude Monet Painting in his Studio (1874, Neue Pinakothek).

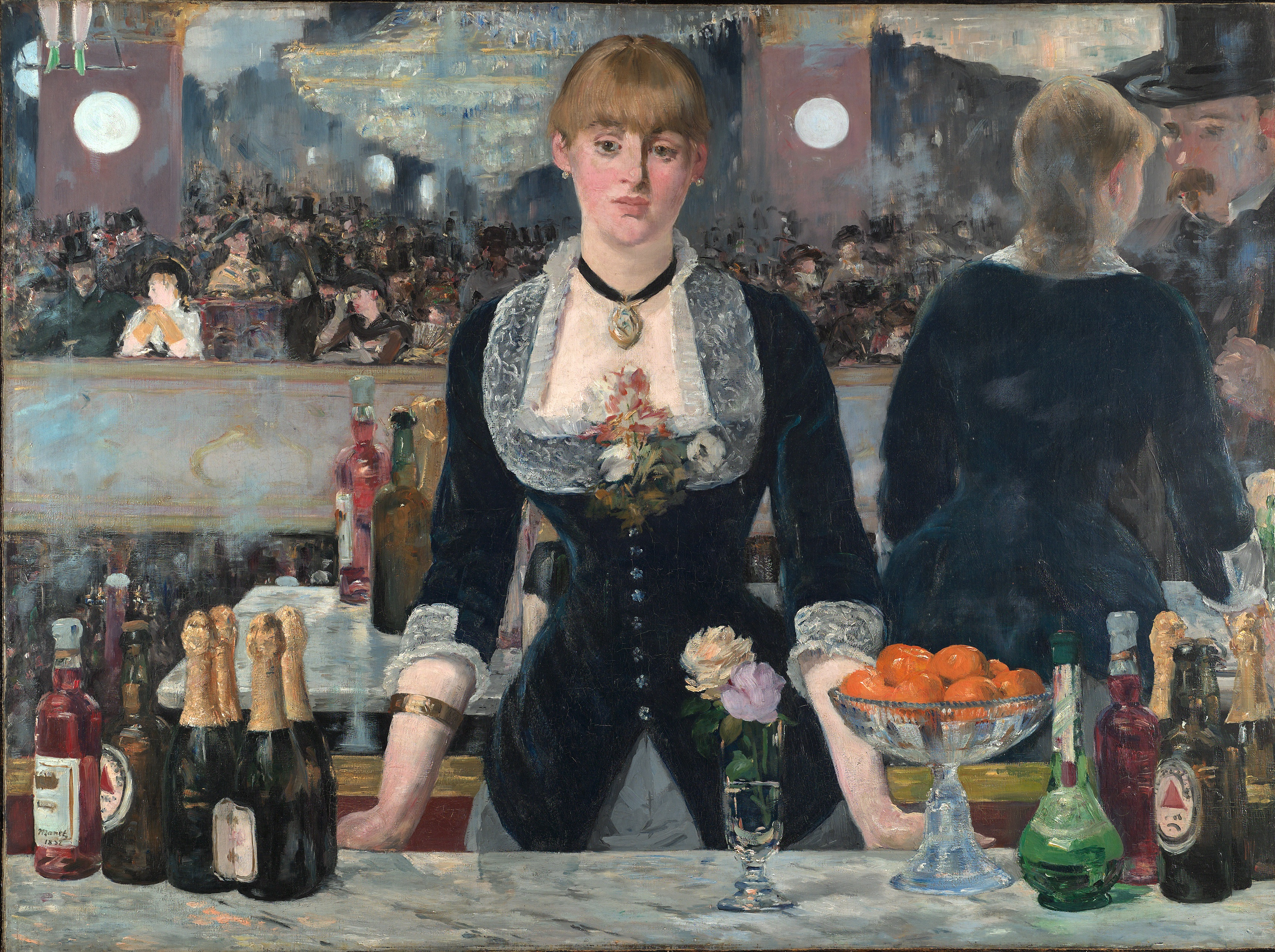
Édouard Manet, A Bar at the Folies-Bergère (1882, Courtauld Gallery).

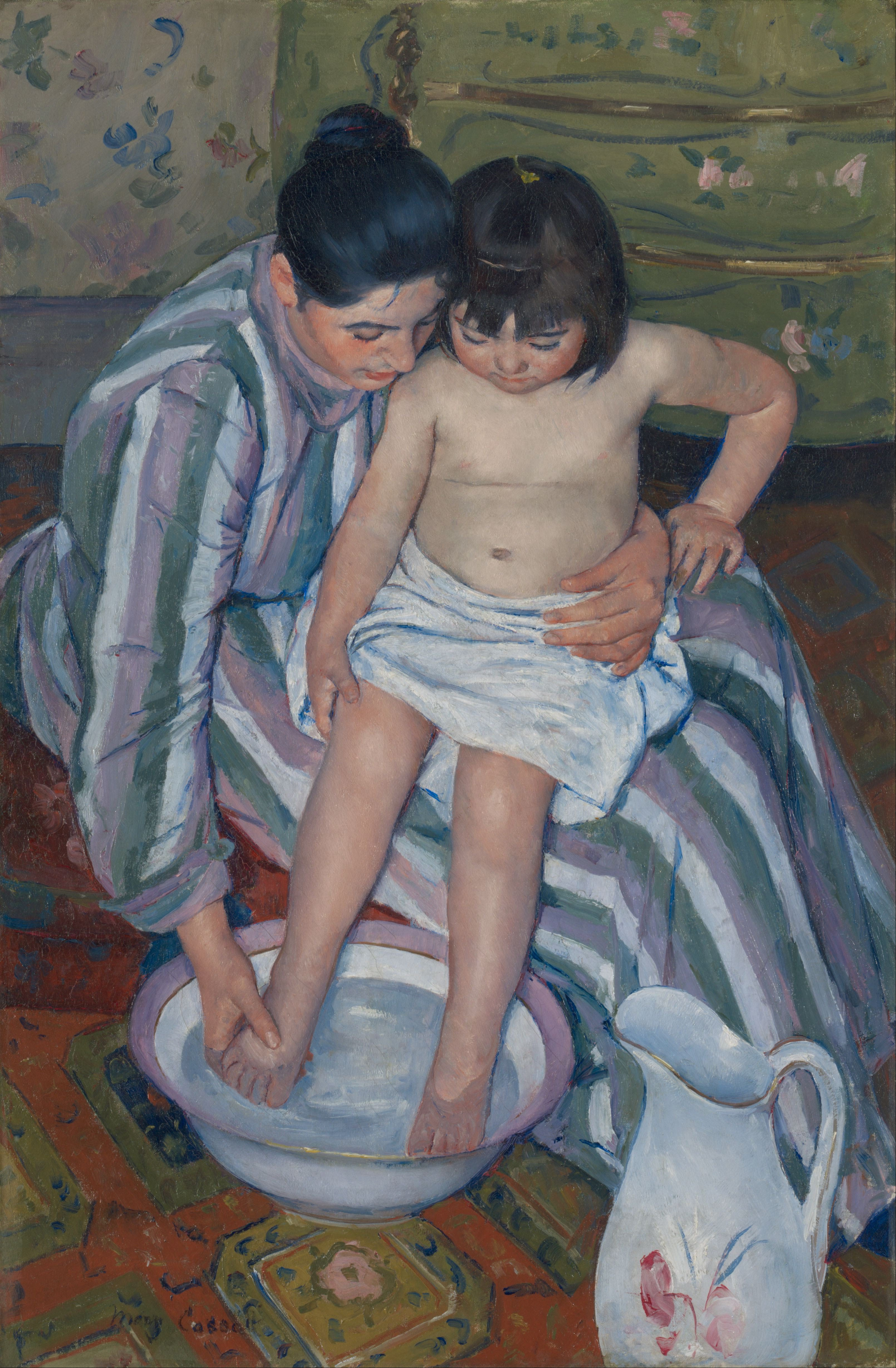
Mary Cassatt, The Child's Bath (1893, Art Institute of Chicago).

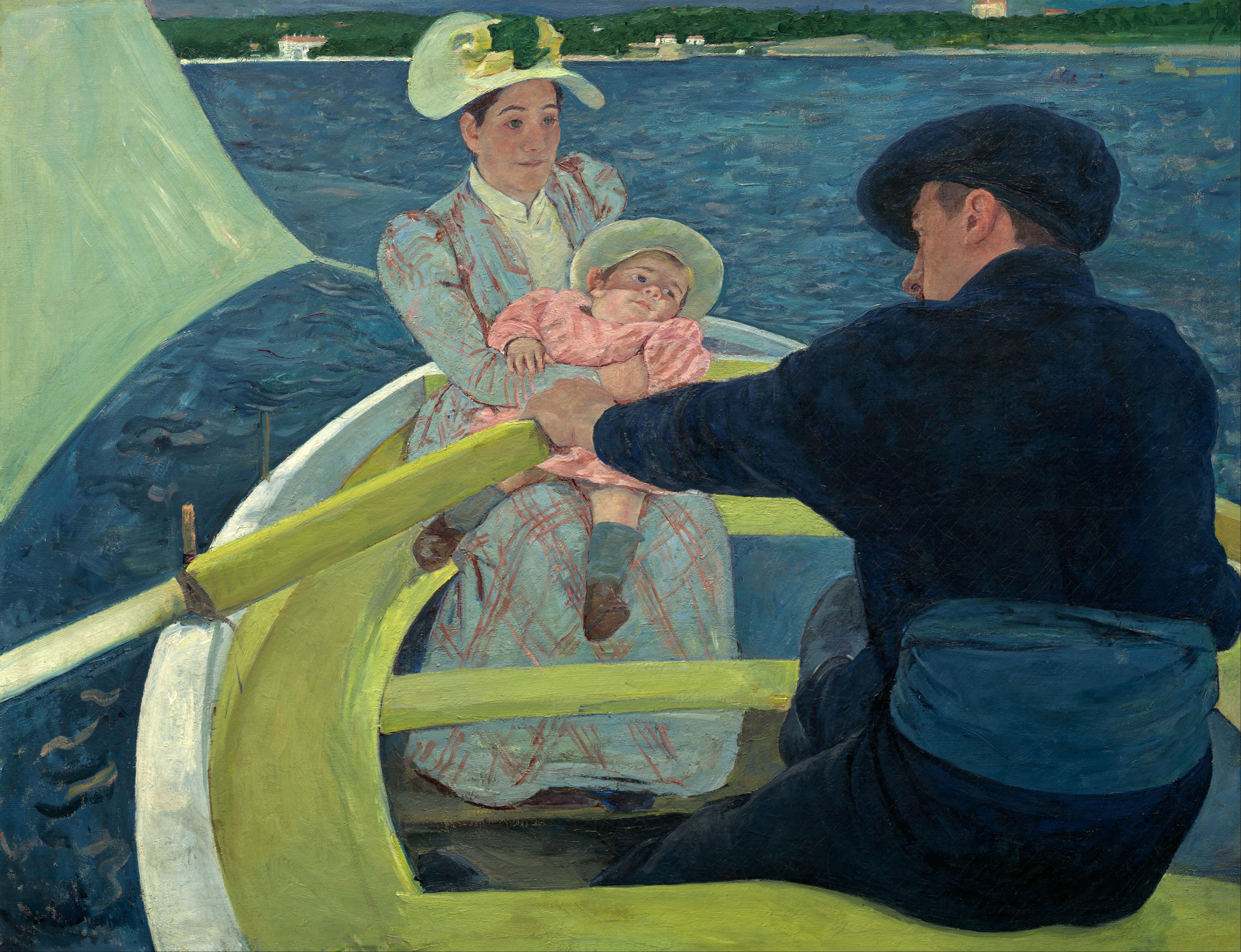
Mary Cassatt, The Boating Party (c. 1894, National Gallery of Art).

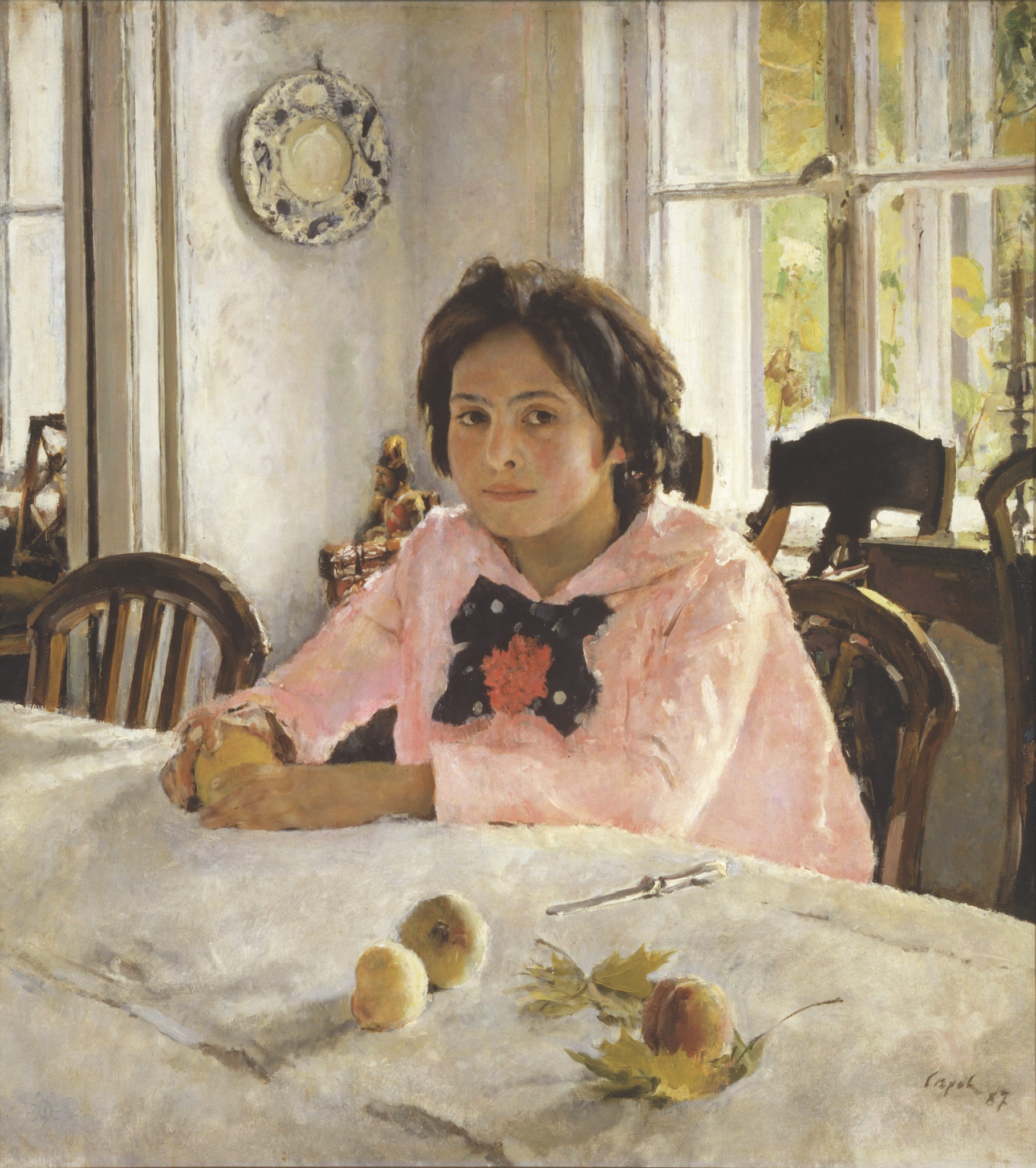
Valentin Serov, Girl with Peaches (1887, Tretyakov Gallery).

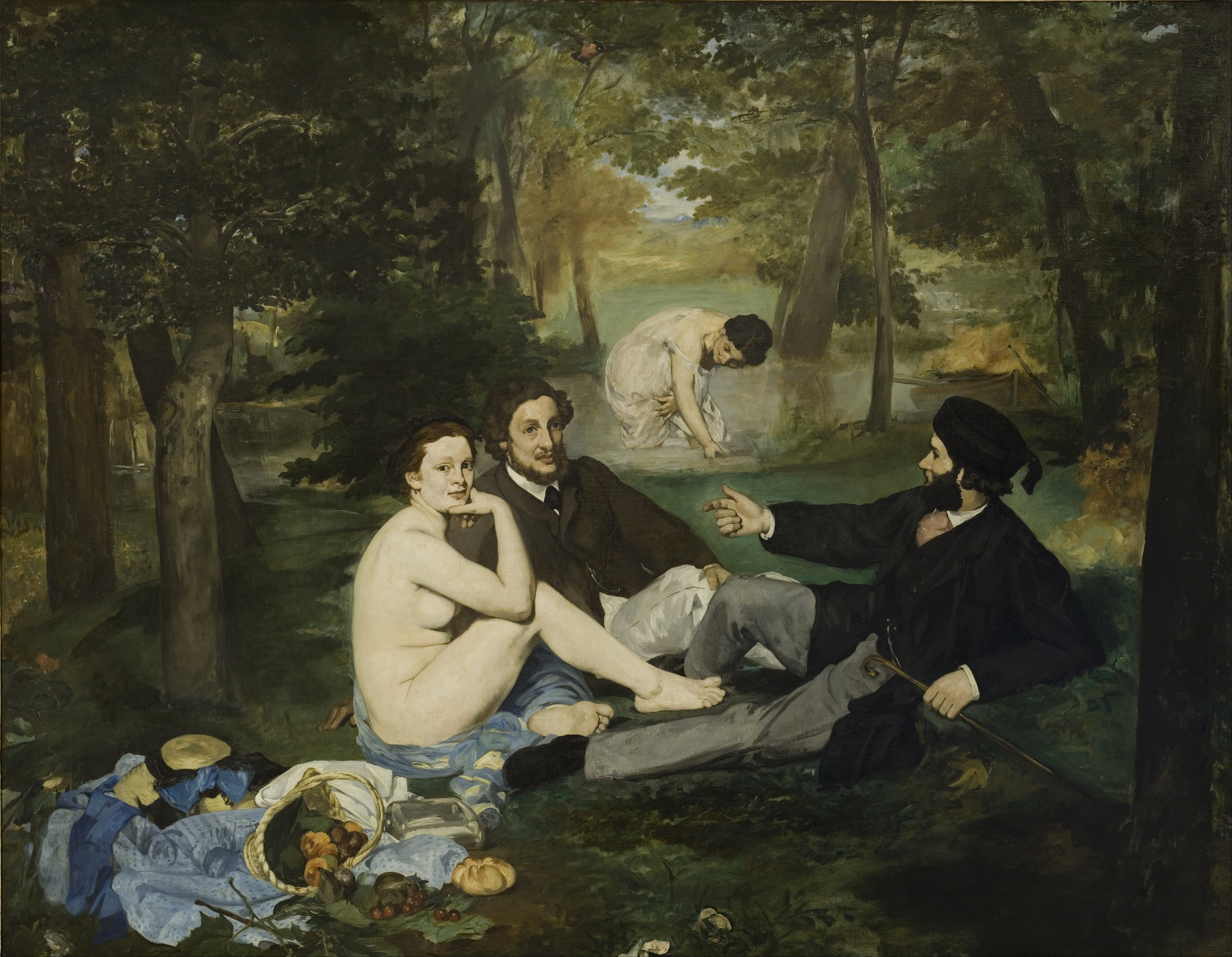
Édouard Manet, Le Déjeuner sur l'herbe (1863, Musée d'Orsay). It was rejected from the Salon and displayed in the Salon des Refusés.

In the late 19th century, Romanticism-influenced Impressionists eschewed allegory and narrative in favor of direct engagement with the modern world, sometimes painting with little or no preparatory study, relying on deftness of drawing and a highly chromatic palette. The Musée d'Orsay houses many impressionist works.

The Barbizon School and Dutchman Johan Jongkind (1819–1891) influenced Hague School Impressionists like Anton Mauve (1838–1888), leading to Amsterdam Impressionists like George Hendrik Breitner (1857–1923) and Isaac Israëls (1865–1934).

Frenchman Eugène Boudin (1824–1898) painted landscapes en plein air, influencing Claude Monet (1840–1926), Frédéric Bazille (1841–1879), Camille Pissarro (1830–1903), and Alfred Sisley (1839–1899) to do so together. By painting in direct sunlight with vivid, synthetic pigments, they developed a lighter and brighter manner of painting.

Édouard Manet (1832–1888), Edgar Degas (1834–1917), Pierre-Auguste Renoir (1841–1919), Berthe Morisot (1841–1895), and Mary Cassatt (1844–1926) concentrated primarily on the human subject. Both Manet and Degas embraced industrialization and urbanization, painting more realistically, and reinterpreting classical figurative canons, with Manet experiencing hostile public reception.

Claude Monet, Water Lilies and Japanese Bridge (1899, Princeton Art Museum). One of a series of monumental works of Water Lilies painted in Giverny.

Degas is best known for painting ballet dancers. Renoir, Morisot, and Cassatt painted domestic scenes; Renoir painted several female nudes. Other French impressionists include James Tissot (1836–1902), Antoine Guillemet (1843–1918) and Gustave Caillebotte (1848–1894). Russian impressionists include Valentin Serov (1865–1911).

American Impressionists included Boston, California, Hoosier, and Pennsylvania artists, and "The Ten": John Henry Twachtman (1853–1902), Julian Alden Weir (1852–1919), Childe Hassam (1859–1935), Theodore Robinson (1852–1896), Frank Weston Benson (1862–1951), Joseph DeCamp (1858–1923), Thomas Dewing (1851–1938), Willard Metcalf (1858–1925), Robert Reid (1862–1929), Edward Simmons (1852–1931), and Edmund C. Tarbell (1862–1938). Munich-influenced William Merritt Chase (1849–1916) joined after Twachtman's death. Impressionism also exerted influence on non-impressionist painters, such as Sargent.

The Heidelberg School, also known as Australian impressionism, includes painters Tom Roberts (1856–1931), Charles Conder (1868–1909), and Frederick McCubbin (1855–1917).

==== Post-Impressionism ====
Image Gallery (Click "Show" to view)
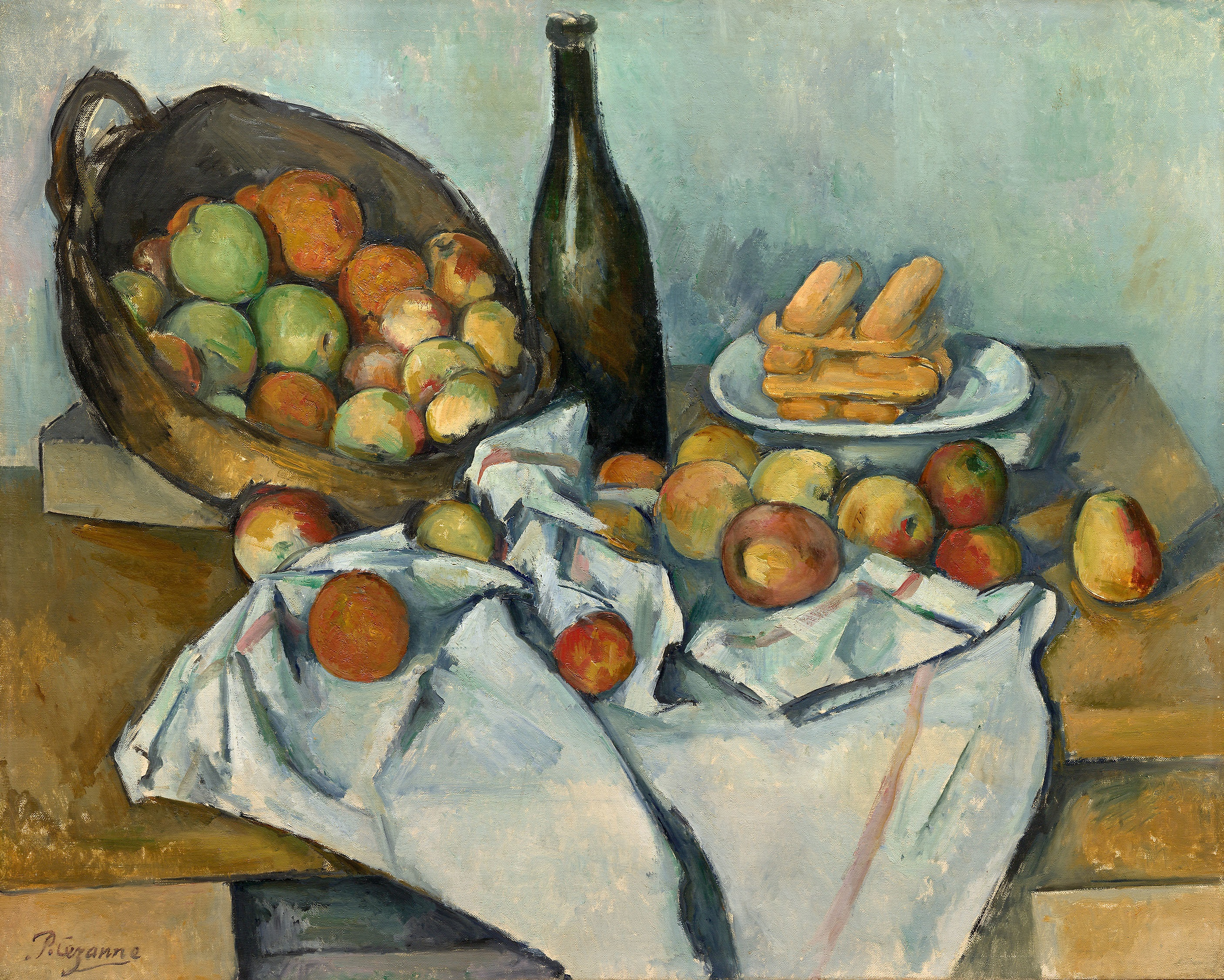
Paul Cézanne, The Basket of Apples (c. 1893, Art Institute of Chicago).

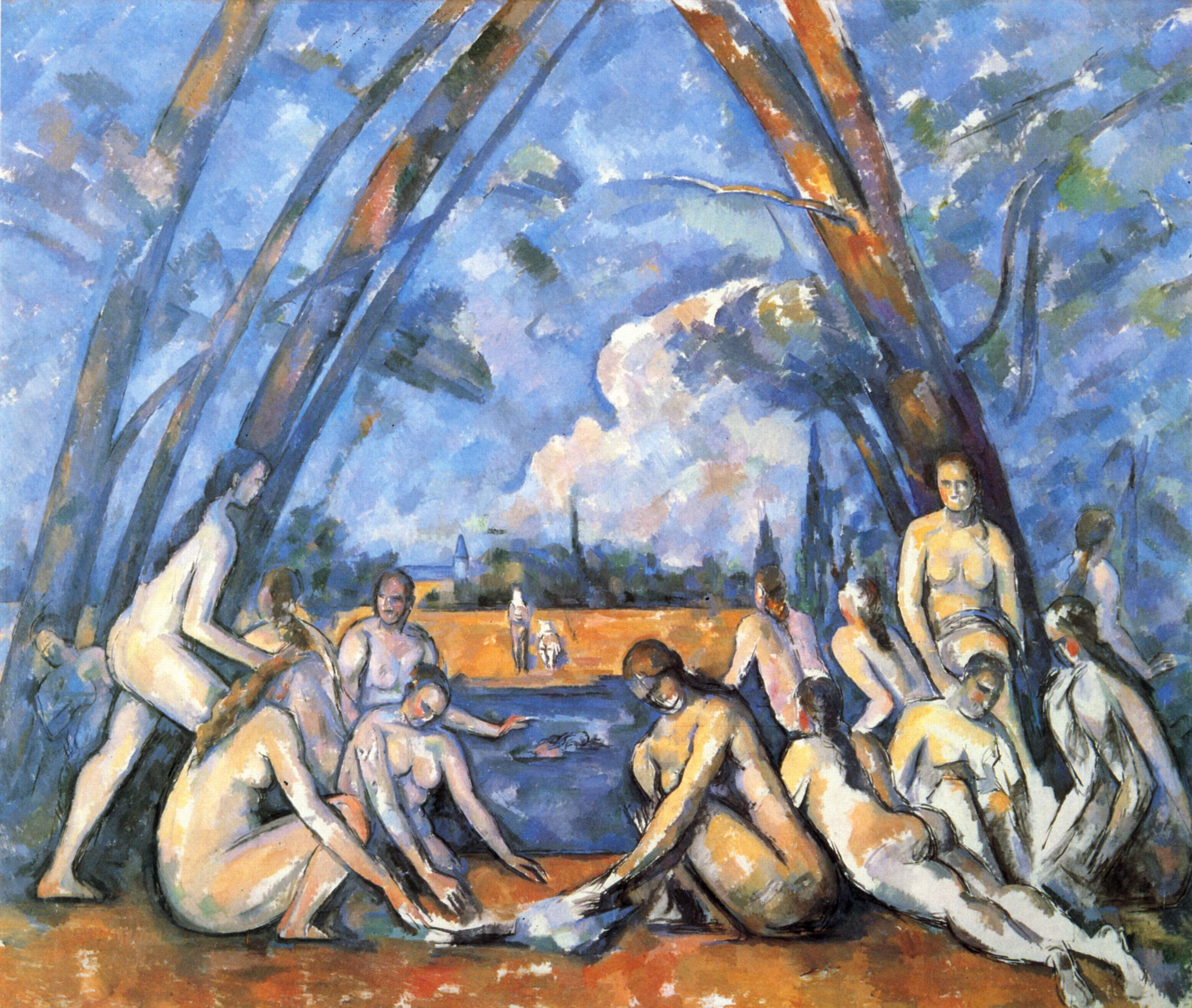
Paul Cézanne, The Large Bathers (c. 1906, Philadelphia Museum of Art).

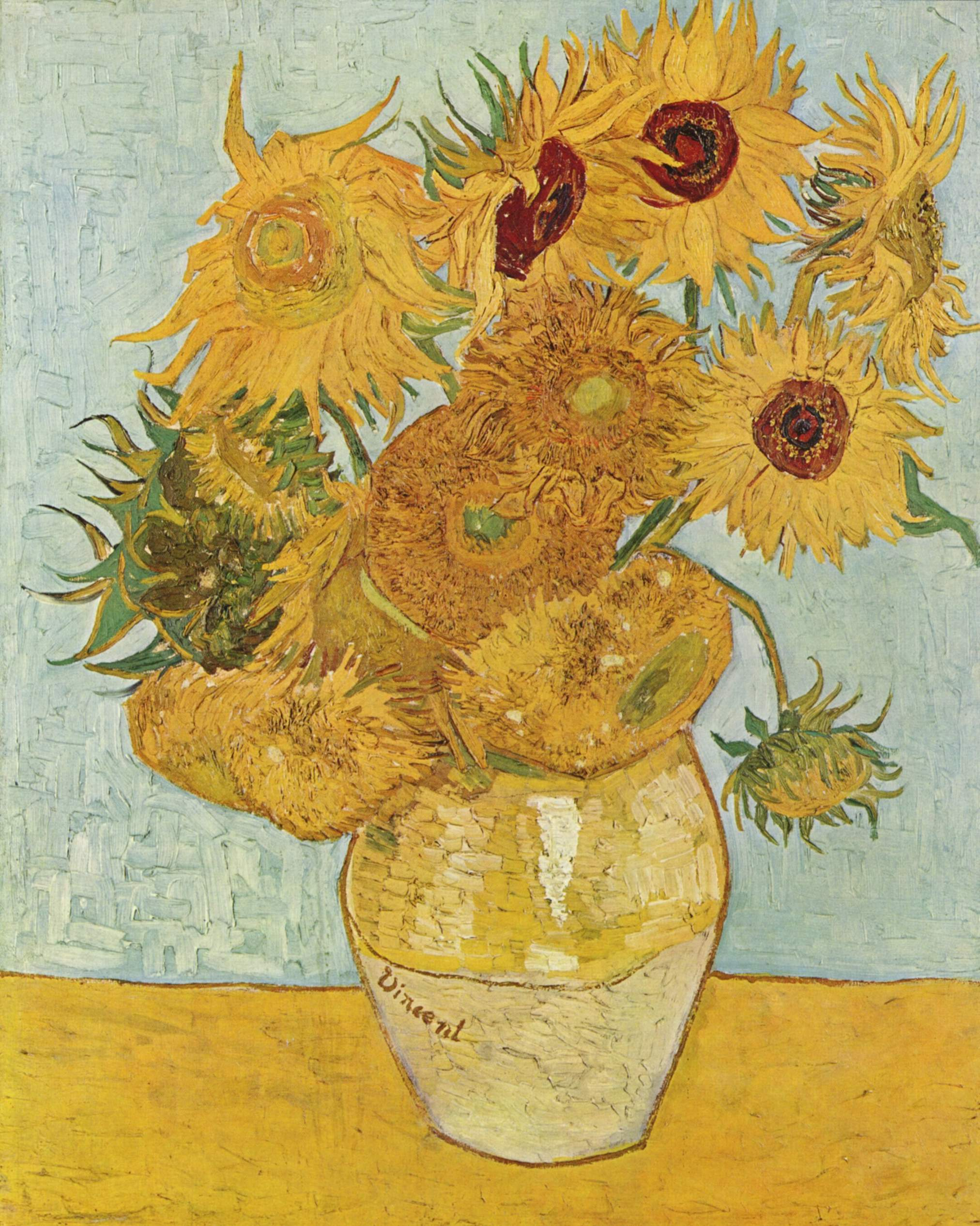
Vincent van Gogh, Sunflowers. (1888, Neue Pinakothek)

Vincent Van Gogh, Bedroom in Arles (1888, Van Gogh Museum).

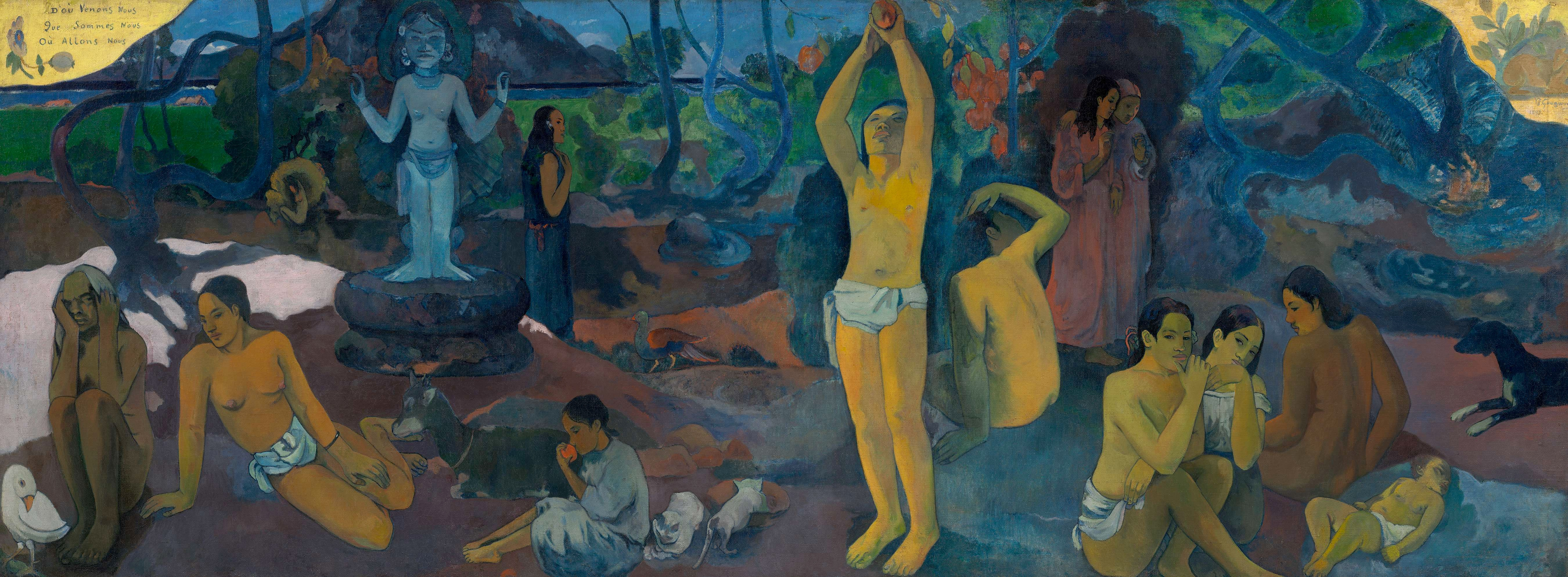
Paul Gauguin, Where Do We Come From? What Are We? Where Are We Going? (c. 1898, Museum of Fine Arts, Boston)

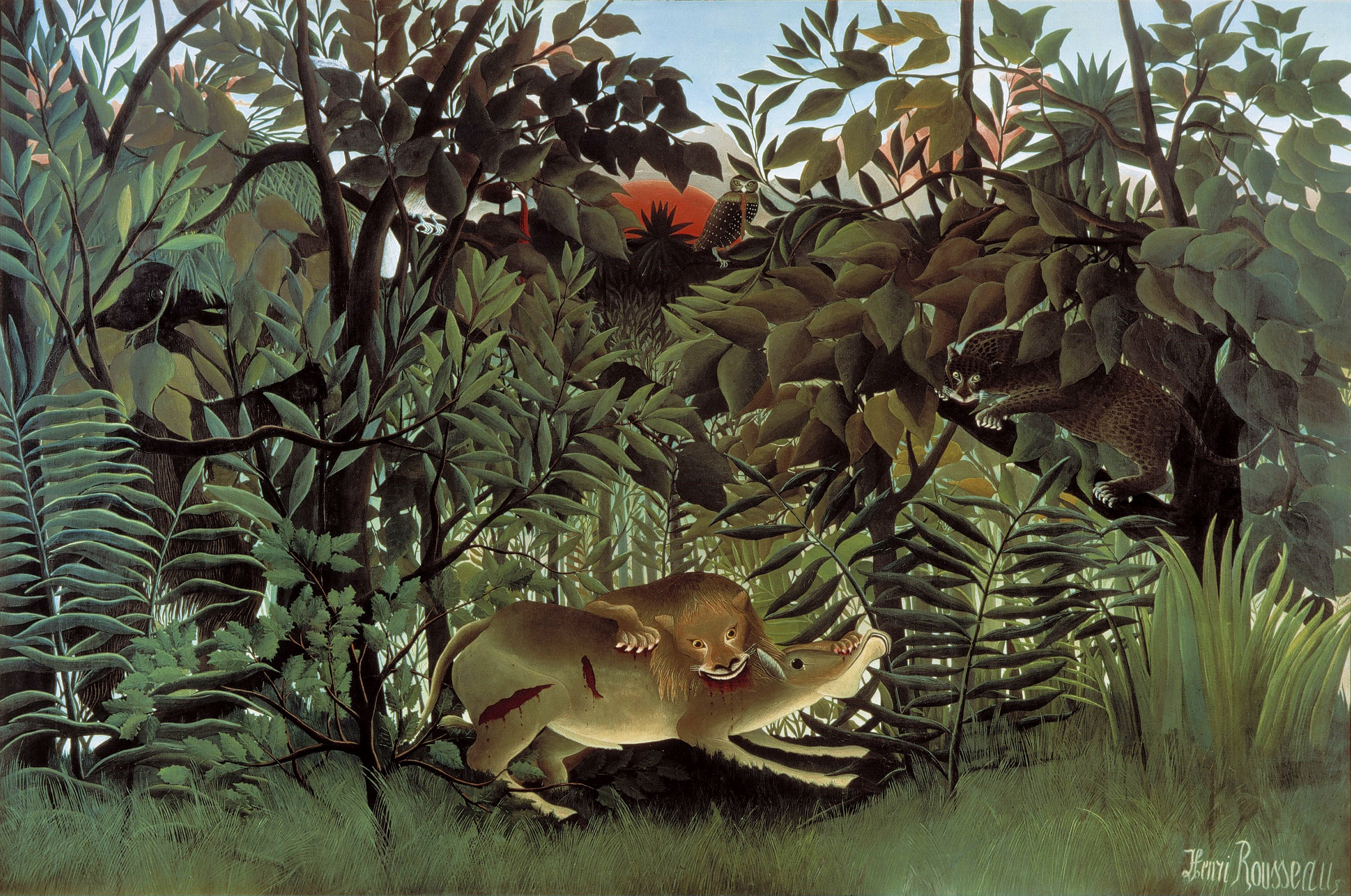
Henri Rousseau, The Hungry Lion Attacking an Antelope (1905, Beyeler Foundation).

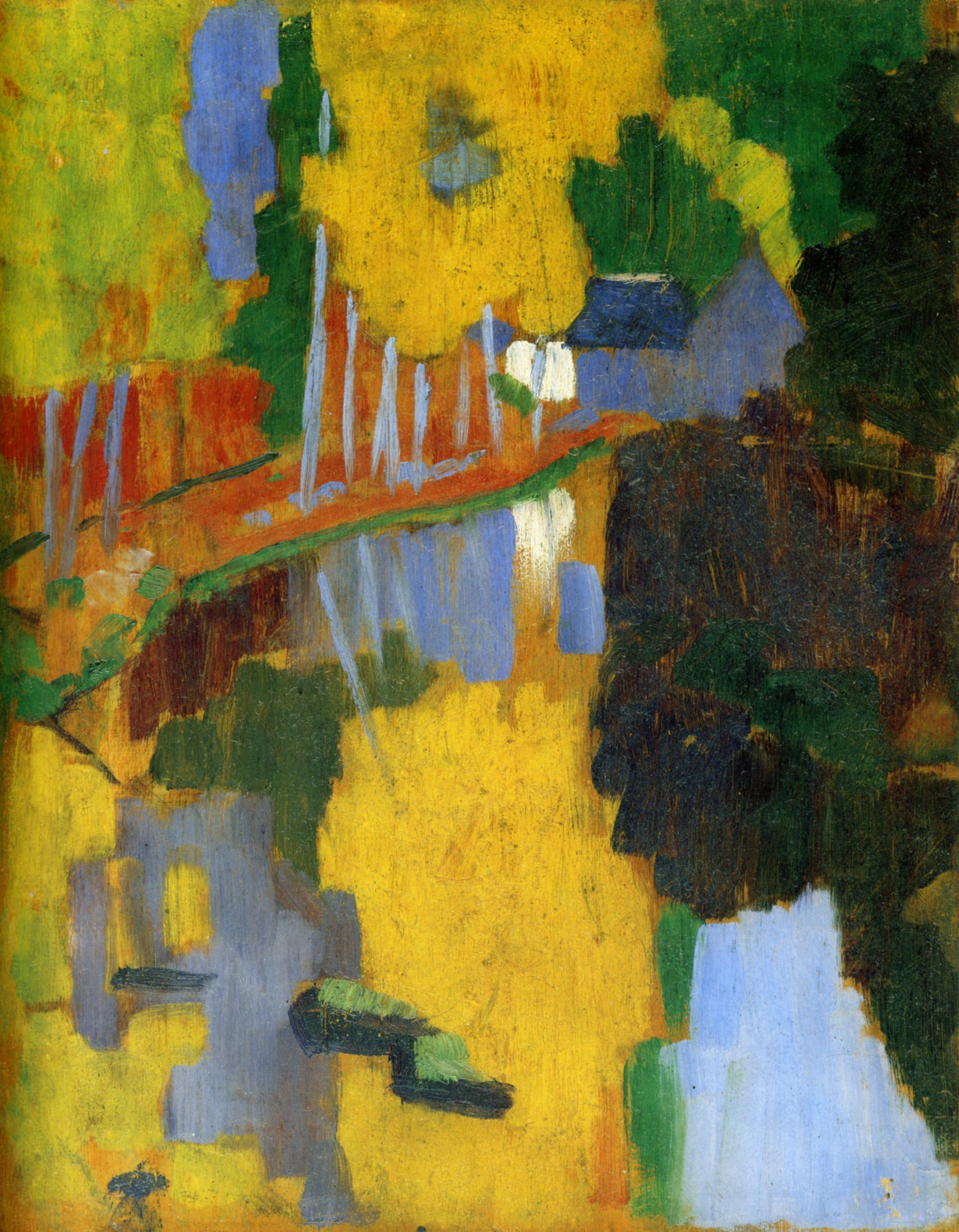
Paul Sérusier, The Talisman (1888, Musée d'Orsay).

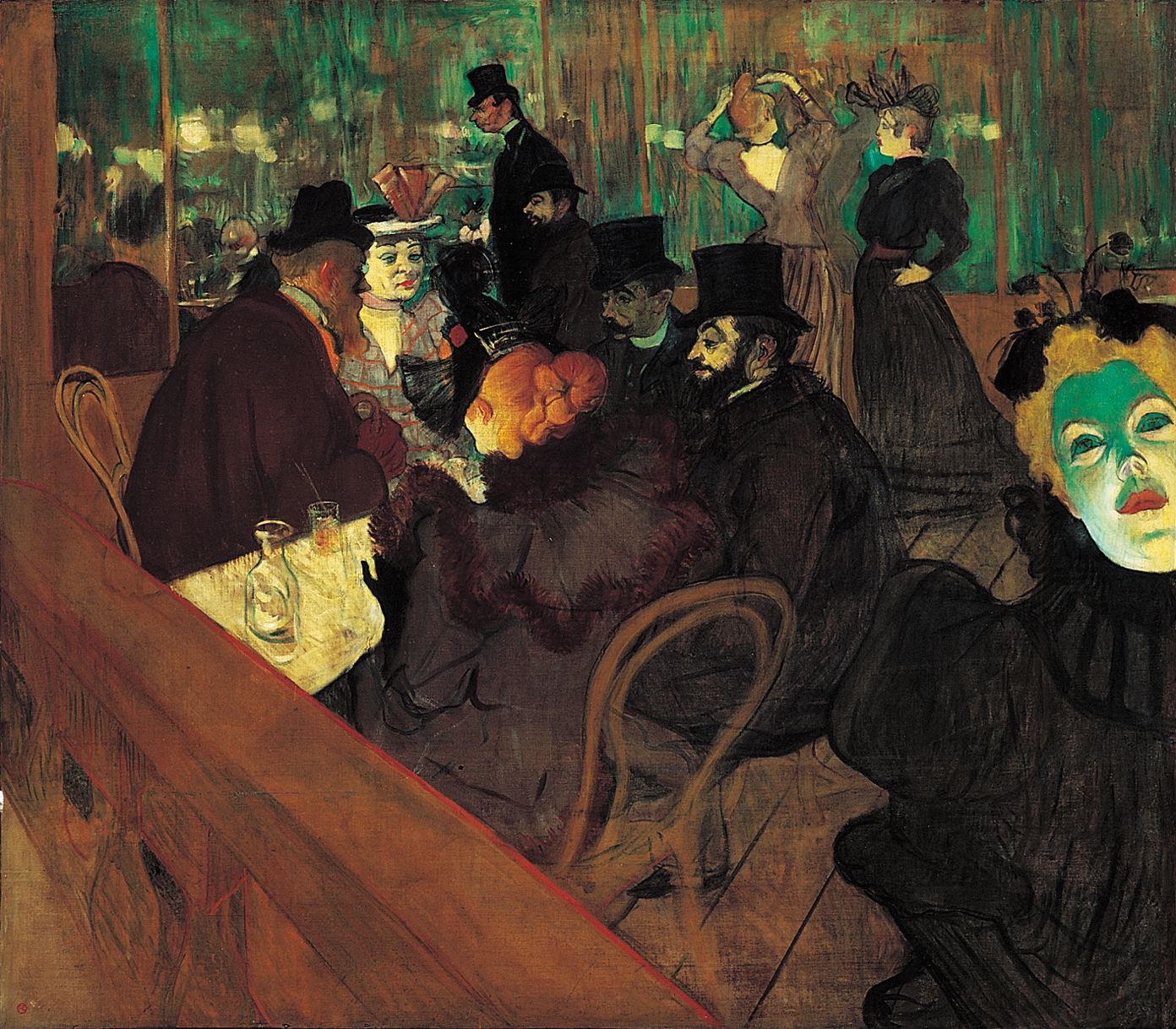
Henri de Toulouse-Lautrec, At the Moulin Rouge (c. 1895, Art Institute of Chicago).

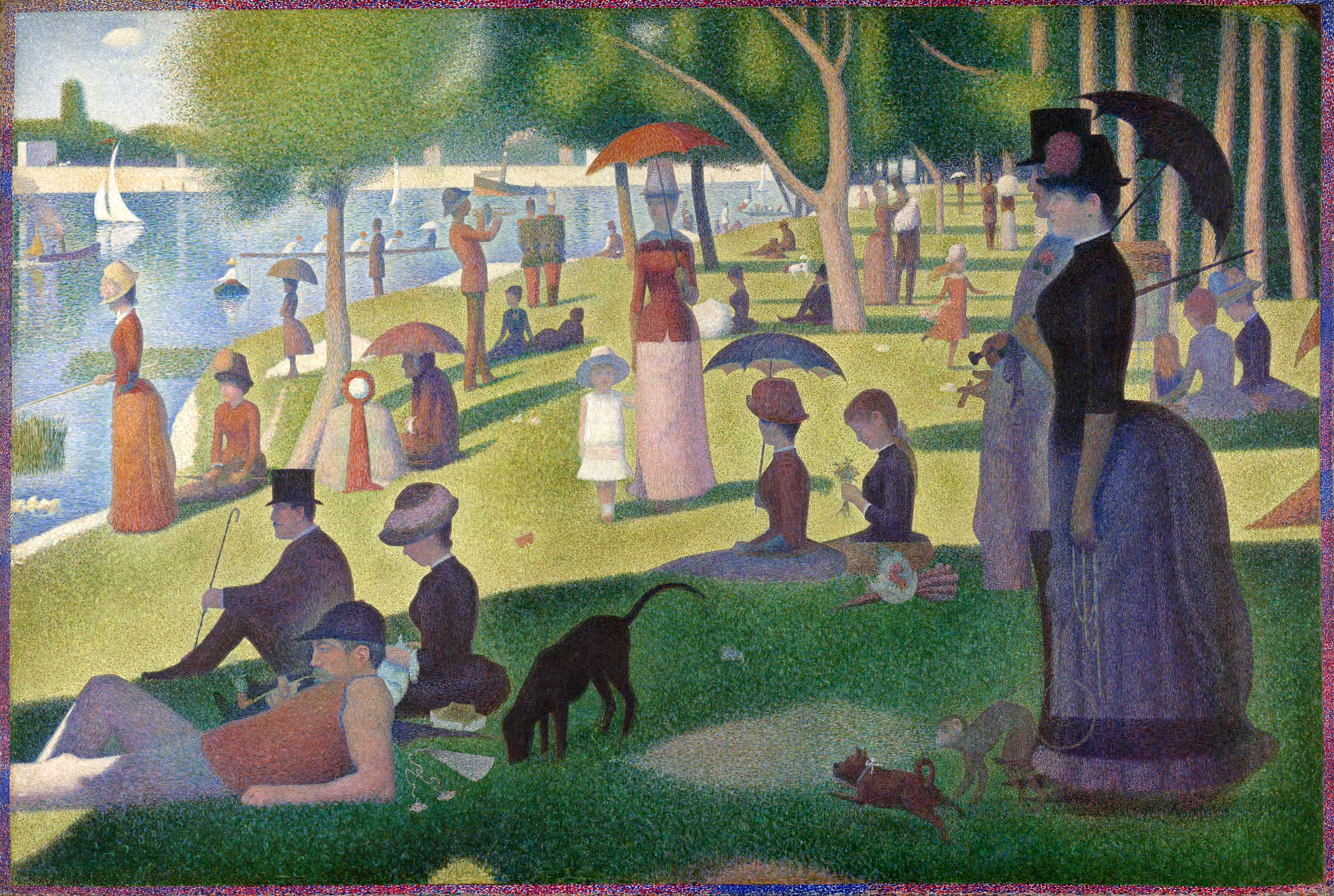
Georges-Pierre Seurat, A Sunday on La Grande Jatte (c. 1884, Art Institute of Chicago).

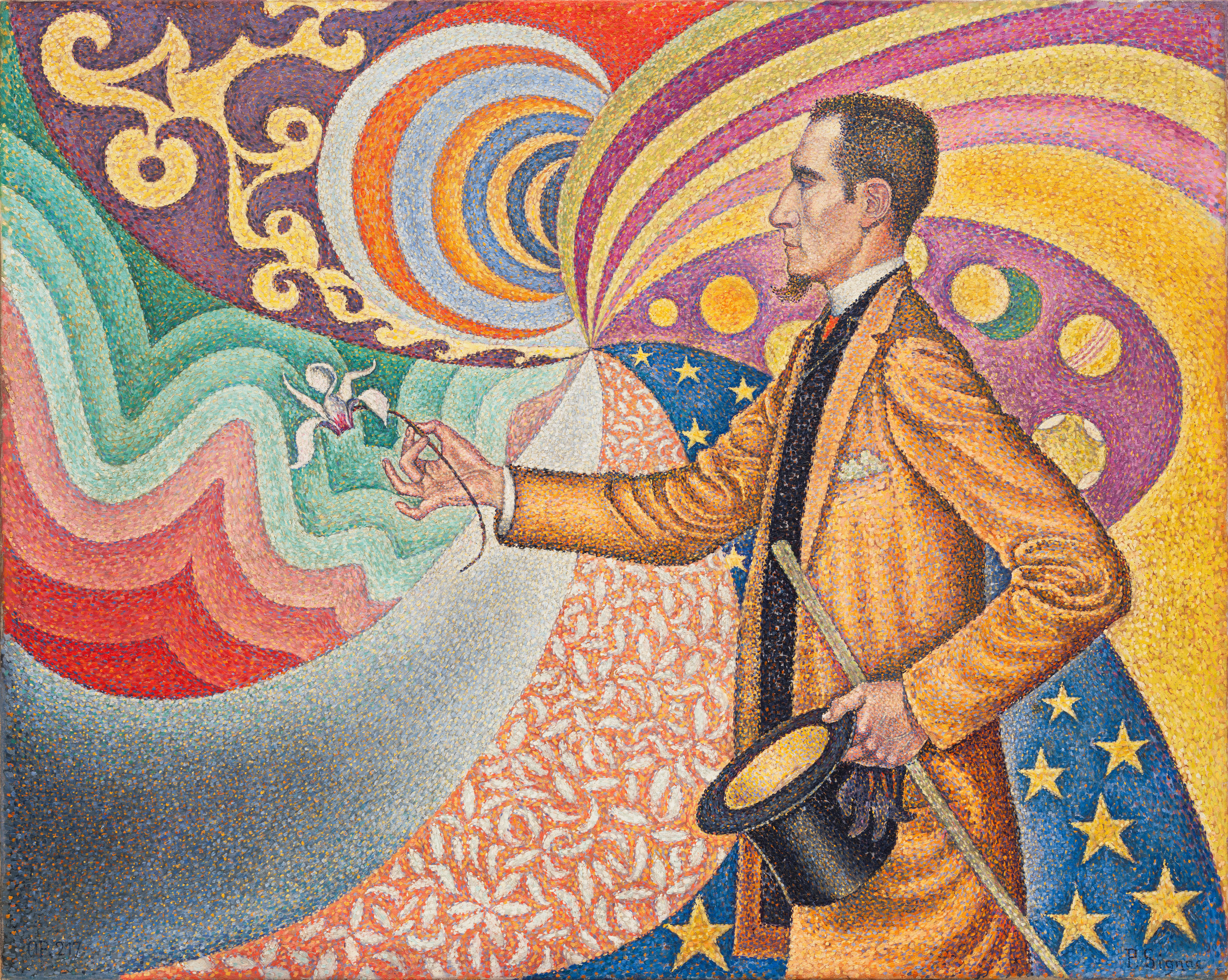
Paul Signac, Portrait of Félix Fénéon (1890, Museum of Modern Art).

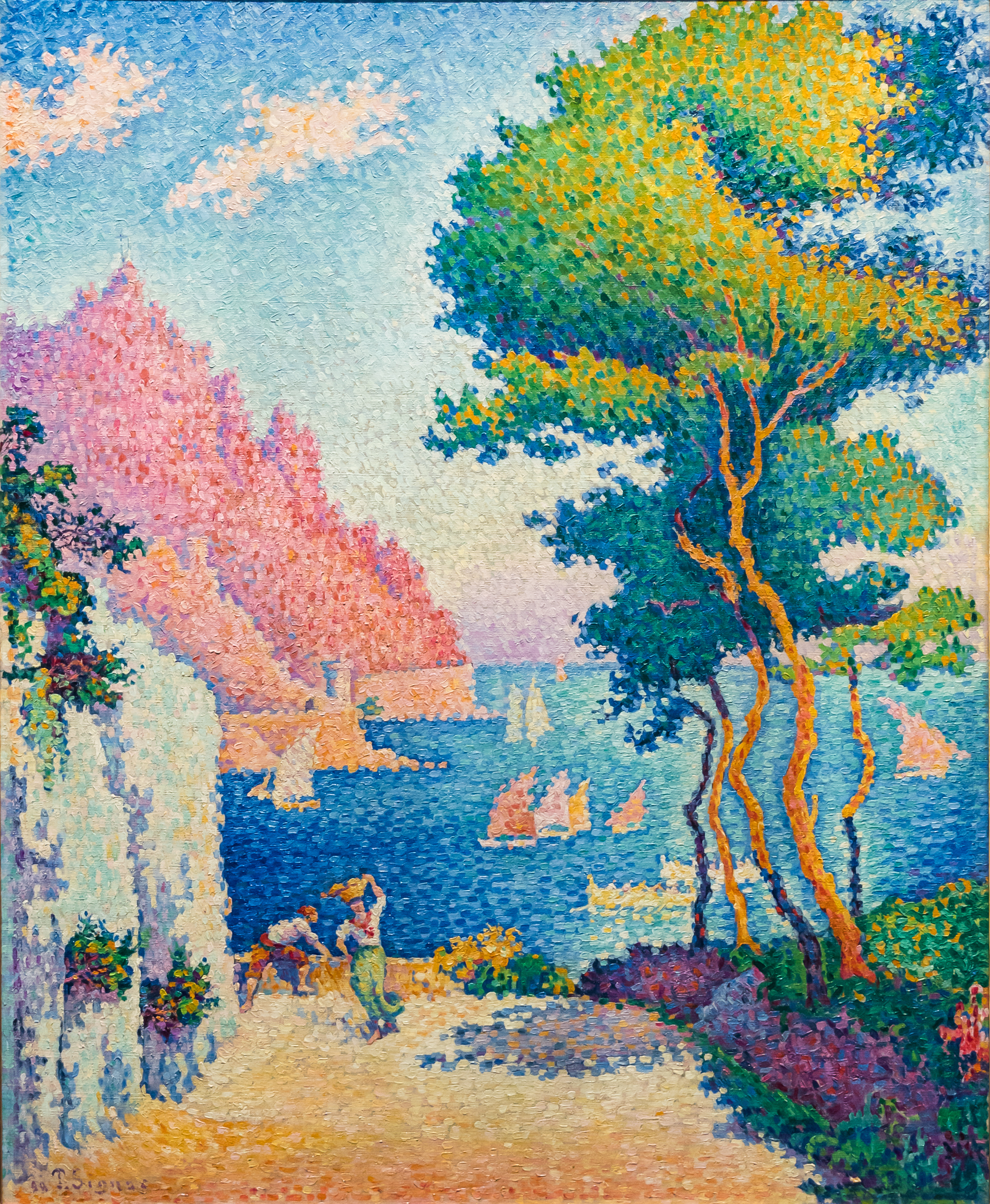
Paul Signac, Capo di Noli (1898, Wallraf-Richartz Museum).

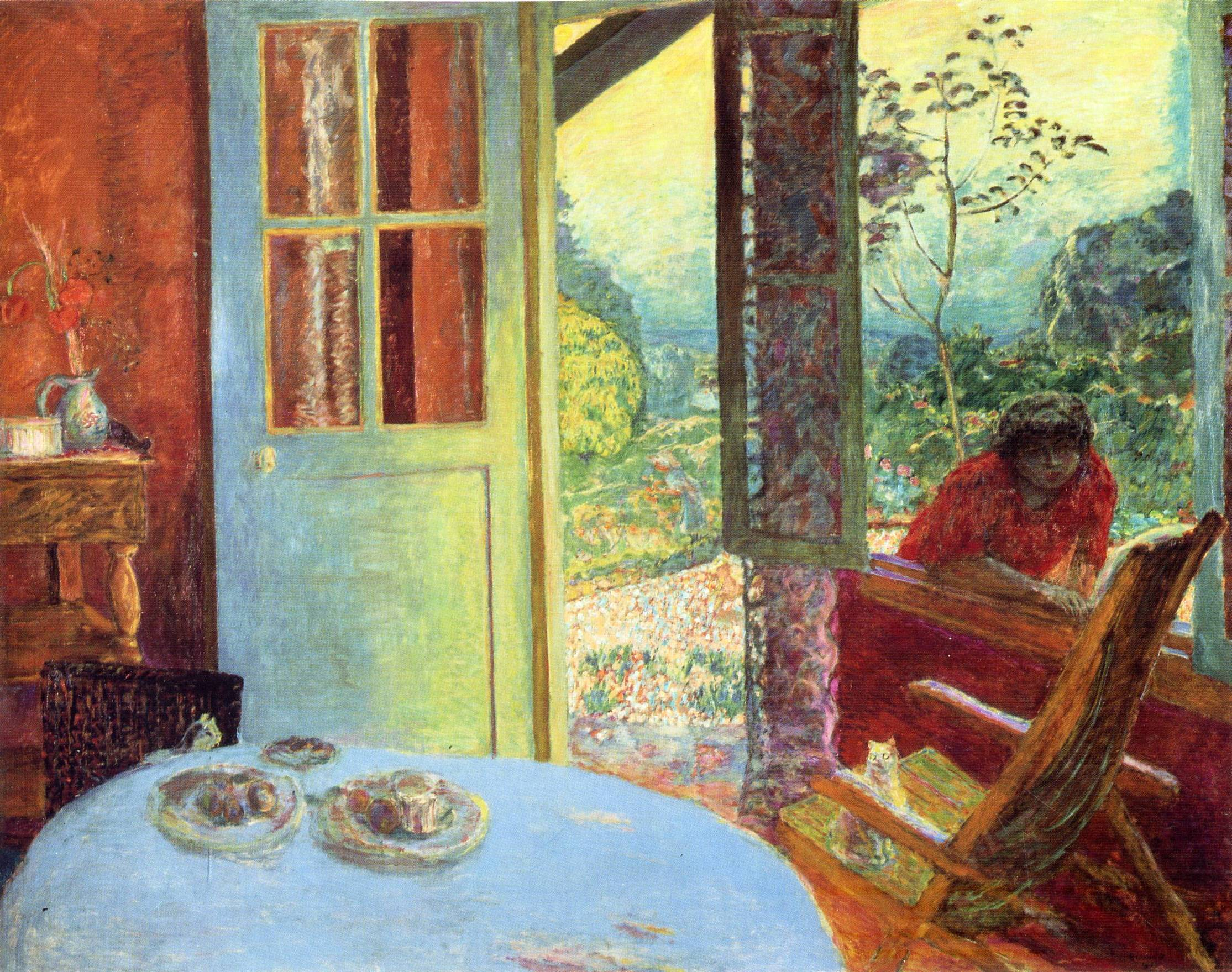
Pierre Bonnard, Dining Room in the Country (Intimism, 1913, Minneapolis Institute of Art).

Vincent Van Gogh, The Starry Night (1889, Museum of Modern Art (MoMA)).

Post-Impressionists of Belle Époque (1871–1914) Paris such as Paul Cézanne (1839–1906), Vincent van Gogh (1853–1890), Paul Gauguin (1848–1903), Émile Bernard (1868–1941), landscape artist Pierre Laprade (1875–1931), naïve painter or primitivist Henri Rousseau (1844–1910), Synthetist and Cloisonnist Paul Sérusier (1864–1927), brothel frequenter Henri de Toulouse-Lautrec (1864–1901), and divisionist and pointillist Georges-Pierre Seurat (1859–1891), are seen as precursors of 20th-century modernism. Belgian Eugène Boch (1855–1941) was the brother of Anna Boch (1848–1936), the only female member of Les XX.

Cézanne united classical composition and a preoccupation with abstract geometric forms, claiming all depiction of nature can be reduced to solids: cylinder, sphere, and cone. while Van Gogh's turbulent painting style was coupled with a sonorous use of color. (Note: After an argument with Gauguin, Van Gogh infamously cut off his left ear, presenting it to a prostitute.) Seurat transformed Impressionism's broken color into a scientific optical study, structured on frieze-like compositions, attracting many followers such as Paul Signac (1863–1935).

Artists such as Whistler, Gauguin, and Toulouse-Lautrec were influenced by Japanese ukiyo-e. For Gauguin, Impressionism gave way to a personal symbolism. Gauguin influenced future art when in 1888 he said to Sérusier

How do you see these trees? Well then, put down yellow. And that shadow is rather blue. So, render it with pure ultramarine. Those red leaves? Use vermilion.

=== Symbolism ===
Image Gallery (Click "Show" to view)
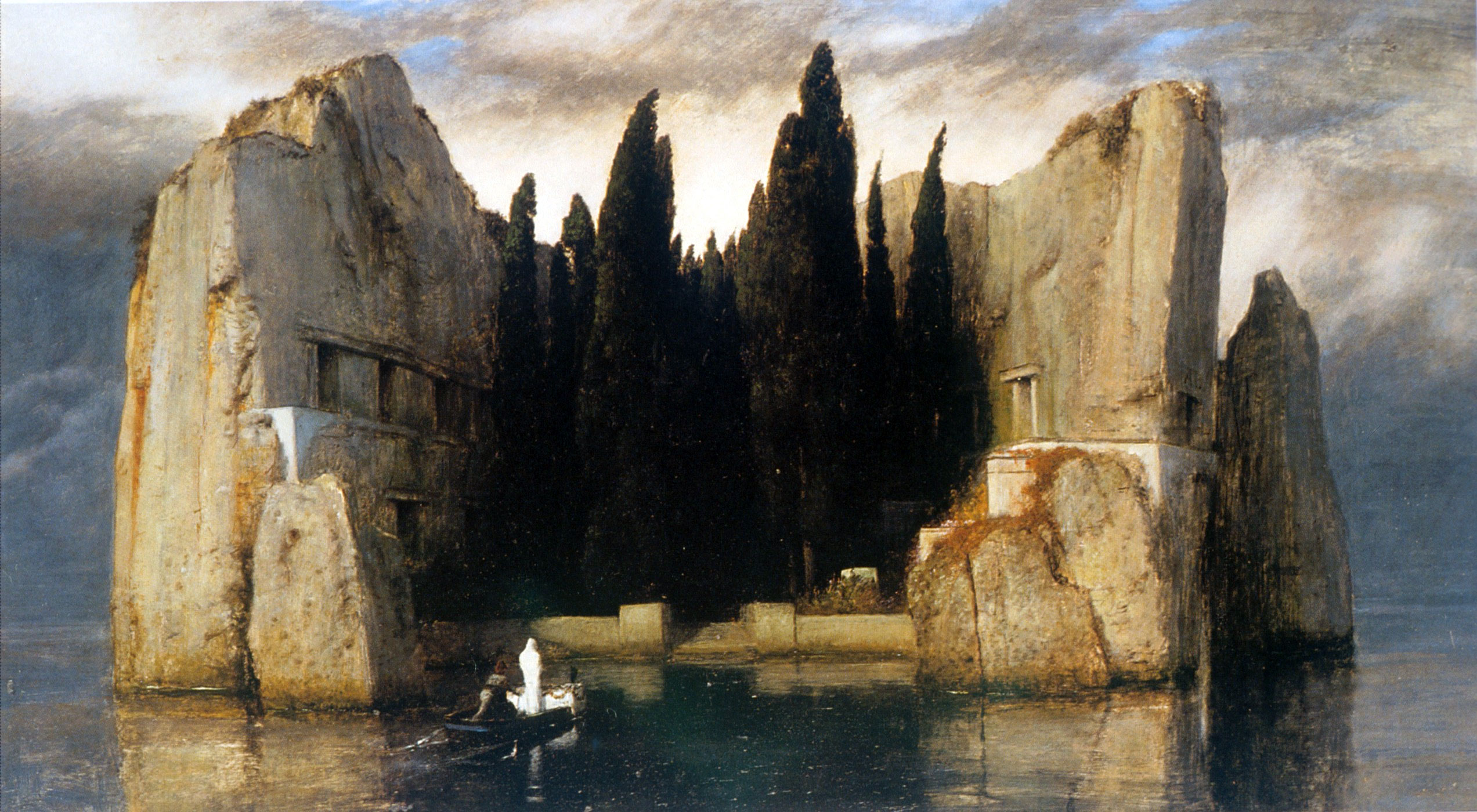
Arnold Böcklin, Isle of the Dead (1883, Alte Nationalgalerie).

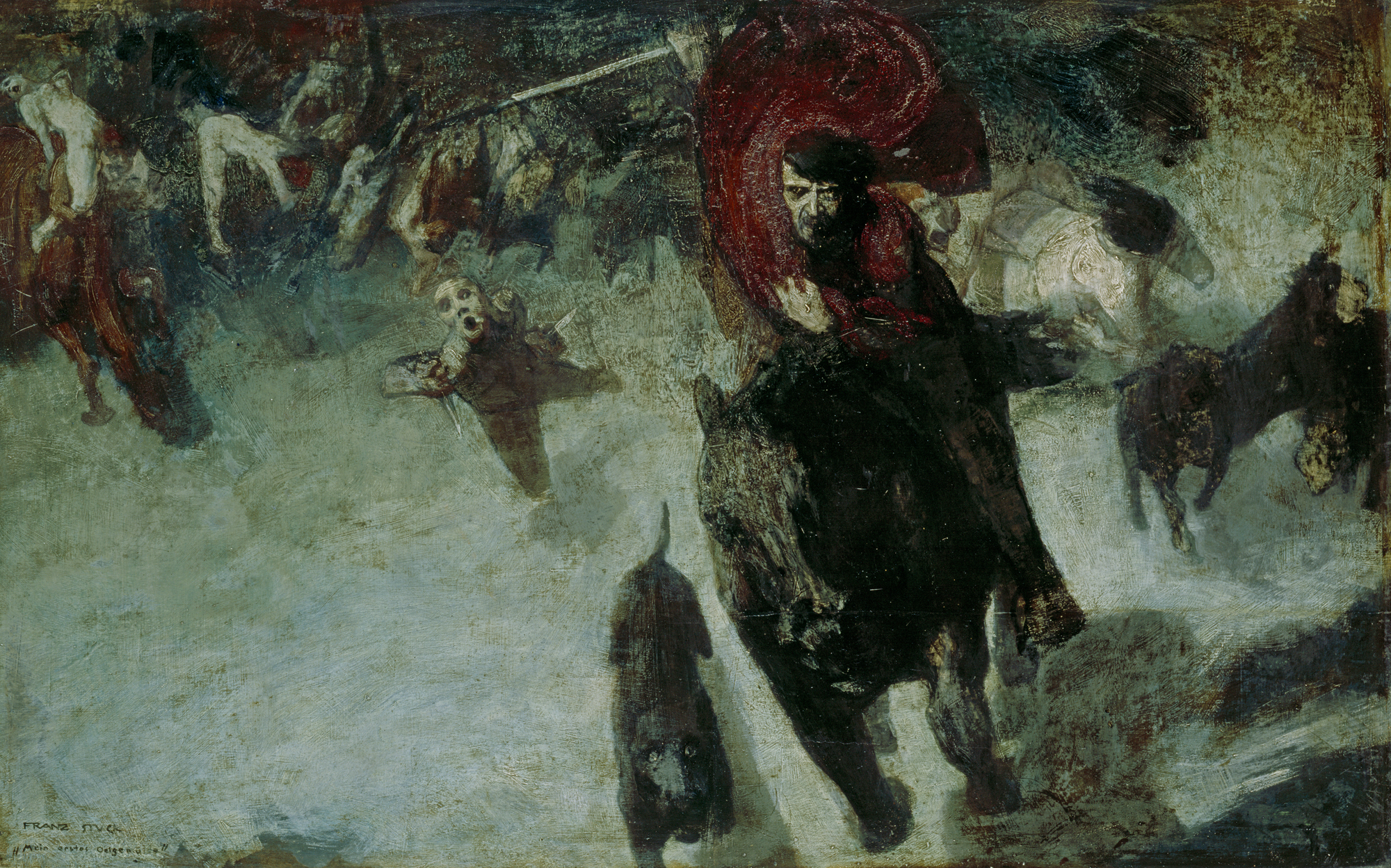
Franz von Stuck, The Wild Chase (c. 1889, Lenbachhaus).

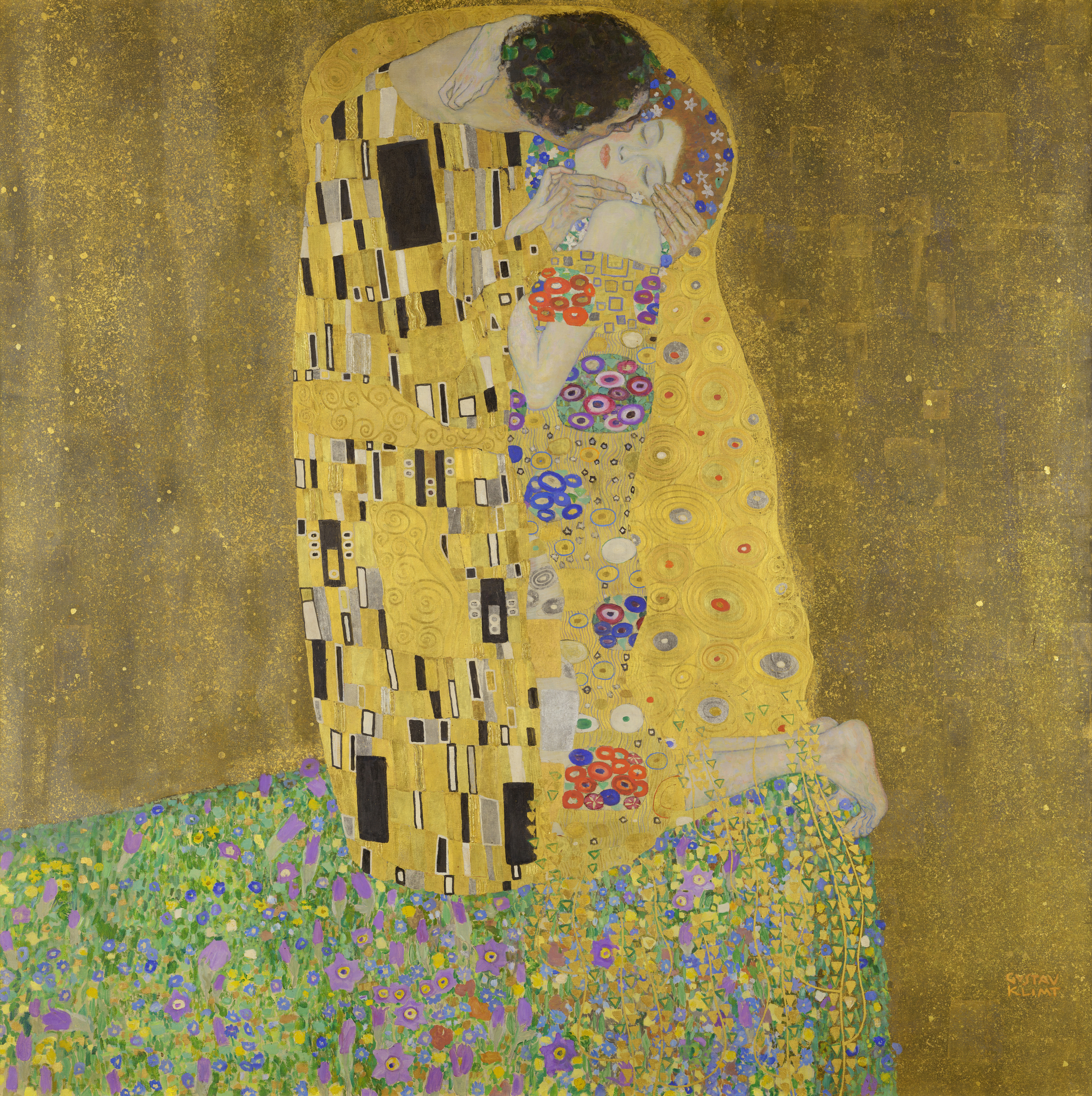
Gustav Klimt, The Kiss (c. 1908, Österreichische Galerie Belvedere). Both symbolism and early expressionism.

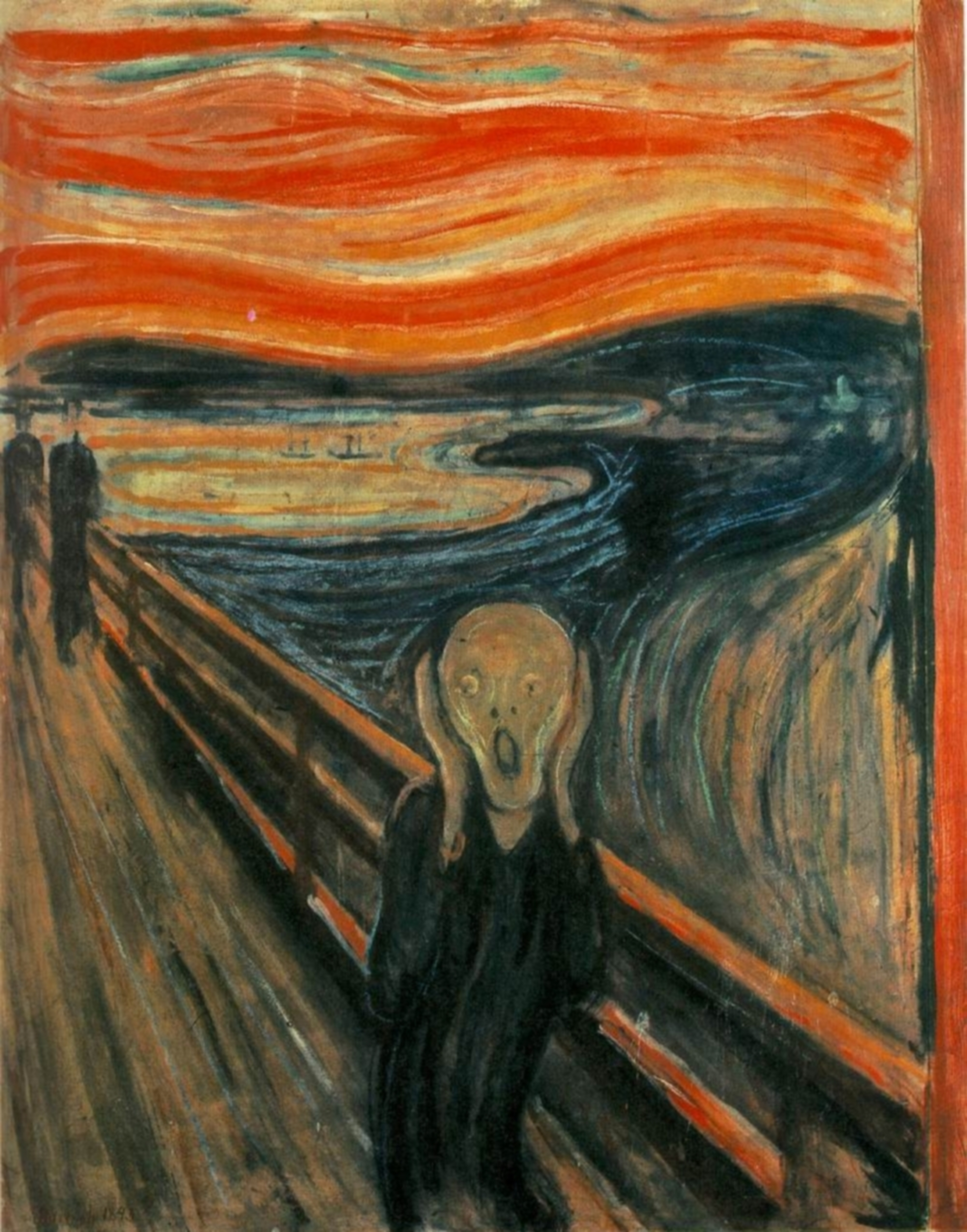
Edvard Munch, The Scream (1893, National Museum of Norway). Both symbolism and early expressionism.

In the late 19th century there also were several, rather dissimilar, groups of symbolist painters. Among them were the mysterious, Romanticism influenced Swiss Arnold Böcklin (1827–1901) and parallelist Ferdinand Hodler (1853–1918), Frenchmen Gustave Moreau (1826–1898), Odilon Redon (1840–1916), Pierre Puvis de Chavannes (1824–1898), and Henri Fantin-Latour (1836–1904), German Franz von Stuck (1863–1928), Belgian Les XX member Félicien Rops (1833–1898), Dutchman Jan Toorop (1858–1928), Austrian Gustav Klimt (1862–1918), Norwegian Edvard Munch (1863–1944), and Russian Mikhail Vrubel (1856–1910).

Symbolist painters used mythology and dream imagery, seeking to understand the soul. The symbols used in Symbolism are not the familiar emblems of mainstream iconography but intensely personal, private, obscure and ambiguous references. Symbolist painters such as Pierre Bonnard (1867–1947) and Édouard Vuillard (1868–1940) influenced the broader Art Nouveau movement and Sérusier-influenced, avant-garde Les Nabis. Bonnard and Vuillard pioneered post-impressionist Intimism after the 1899 disbandment of Les Nabis.

== 20th century ==
20th-century Western painting influenced all the visual arts, including Modernist architecture and design, film, theater, and dance; (Note: Renoir's son was film director Jean Renoir (1894–1979).) and was open to experiment, from photography and concrete poetry to advertising and fashion. The avant-garde featured painters ranging from abstract to super-realist. Post-impressionism and Symbolism resonated with younger artists at the turn of the 20th century, especially with the Fauvists and Surrealists.

=== Fauvism ===
Image Gallery (Click "Show" to view)
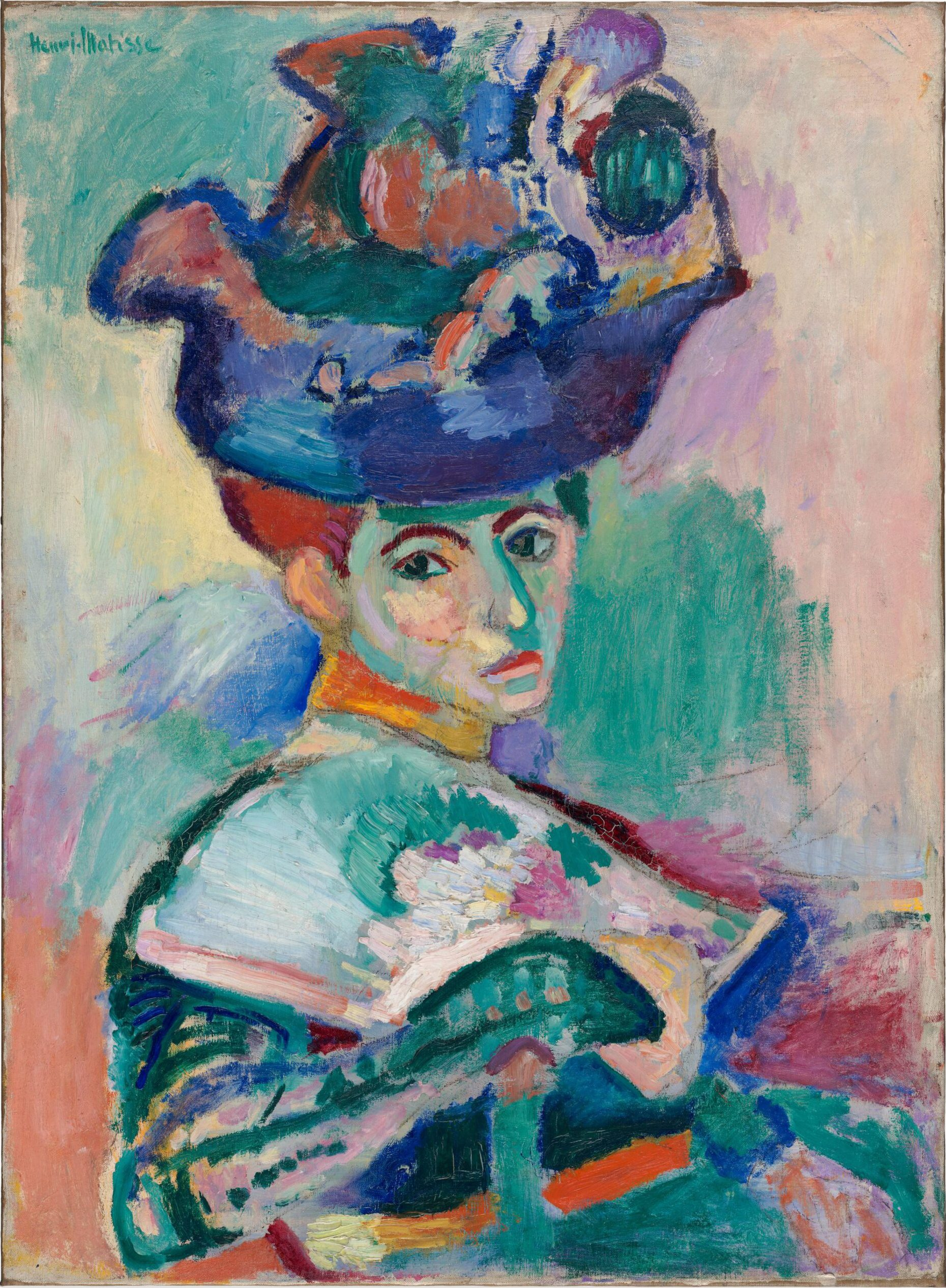
Henri Matisse, Woman with a Hat. (1905, San Francisco Museum of Modern Art). It caused the stir at the 1905 Salon when exhibited, and was widely ridiculed.

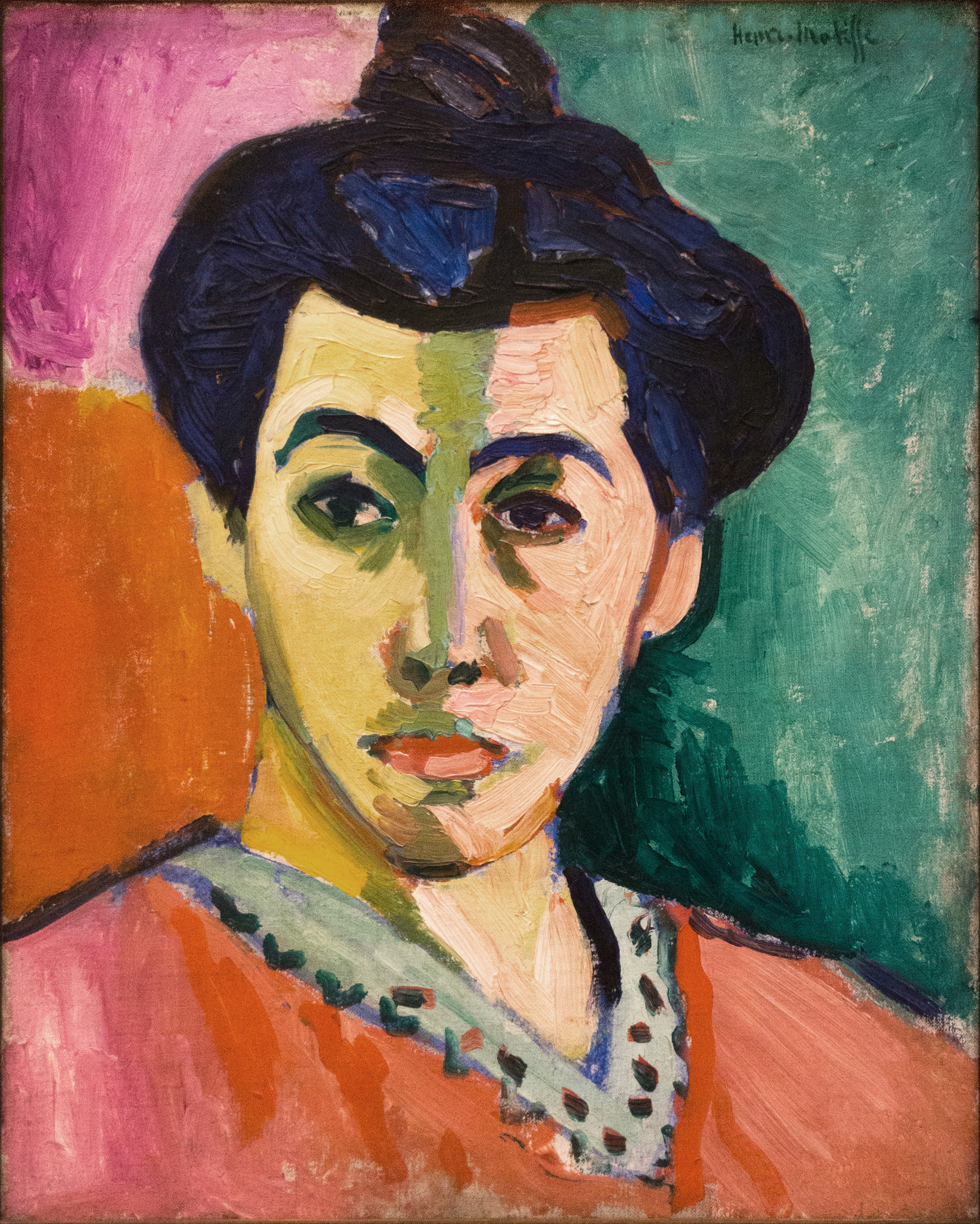
Henri Matisse, Portrait of Madame Matisse or The Green Stripe (1905, National Gallery of Denmark).

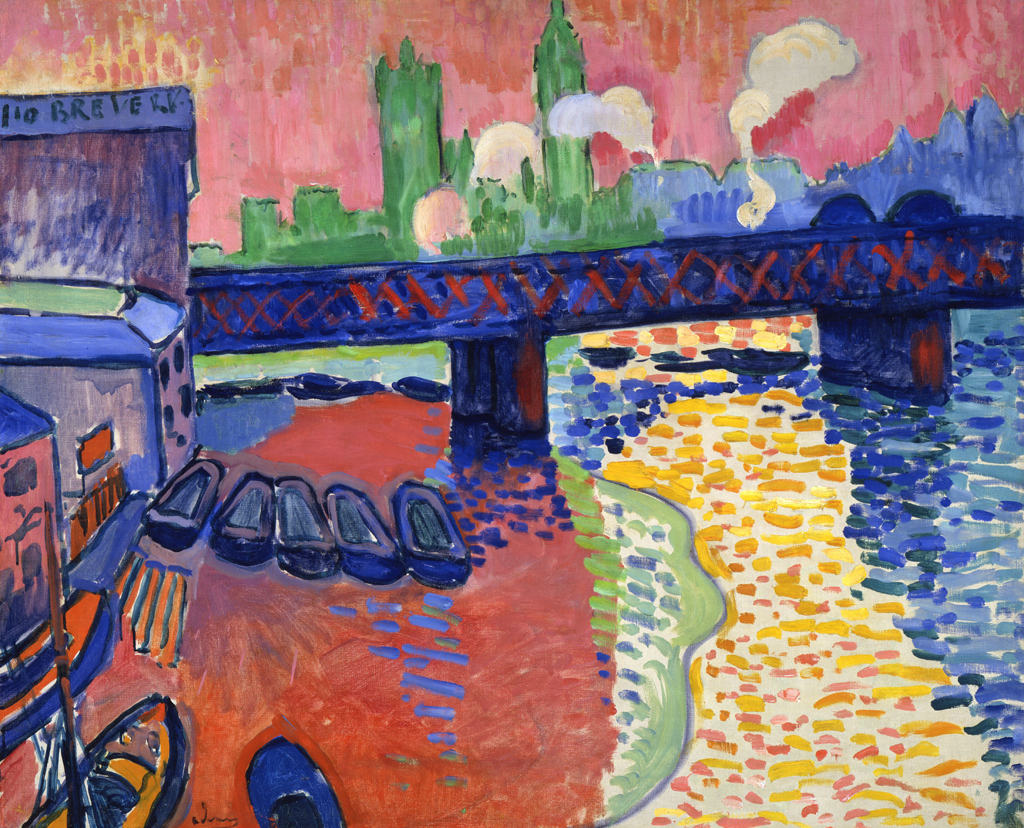
André Derain, Charing Cross Bridge. (1906, National Gallery of Art). An homage to the famous series by Monet.

Maurice de Vlaminck, The Seine at Chatou. (1906, Metropolitan Museum of Art)

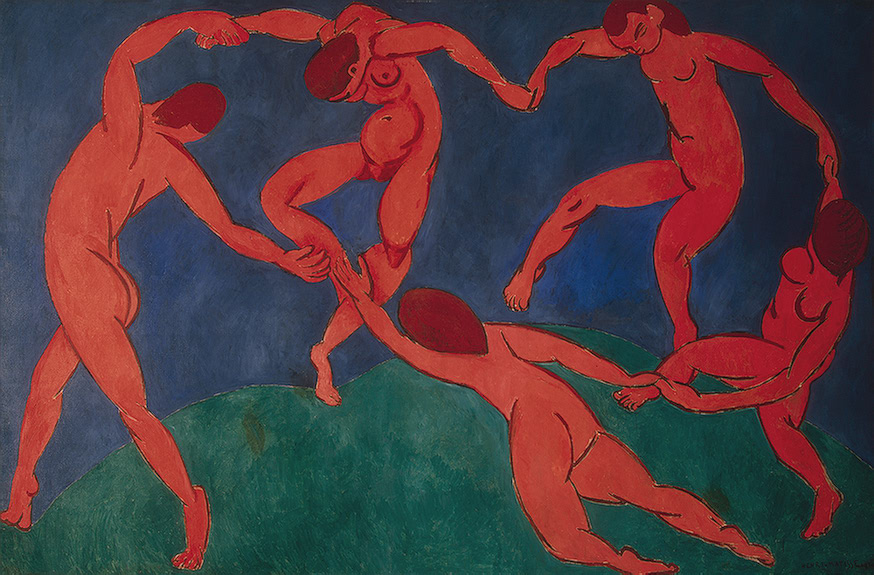
Henri Matisse, The Dance. (1910, Hermitage Museum). This signifies a key point in the development of modern painting, reflecting Matisse's fascination with primitive art.

Henri Matisse (1869–1954) and André Derain (1880–1954), along with several other artists including Georges Braque (1882–1963), Charles Camoin (1879–1965), Raoul Dufy (1877–1953), Albert Marquet (1875–1947), Dutchman Kees van Dongen (1877–1968), and Maurice de Vlaminck (1876–1958) revolutionized the Paris art world with "wild", colorful, expressive landscapes and figure paintings that its critics called Fauvism after Louis Vauxcelles (1870–1943) at the 1905 Salon d'Automne. (Note: The Fauvists gained their name after Vauxcelles described their work with the phrase "Donatello chez les fauves" ("Donatello among the wild beasts"), contrasting the paintings with the Renaissance style sculpture that shared the room with them. The jungle scene The Hungry Lion Throws Itself on the Antelope by non-Fauve Henri Rousseau hung near the works by Matisse, and may have inspired the term used in the press.) Fauvism emphasized saturated, unnatural colors and painterly qualities like powerful brushstrokes, but had no concrete theories, and was short lived, no longer a shocking movement by 1907. (Note: Apollinaire stated "We are not here in the presence of an extravagant or an extremist undertaking: Matisse's art is eminently reasonable.") In 1906, at the suggestion of his dealer Ambroise Vollard (1866–1939), Derain went to London.

=== Cubism ===
Image Gallery (Click "Show" to view)
Georges Braque, Violin and Candlestick (Analytic Cubism, 1910, San Francisco Museum of Modern Art)

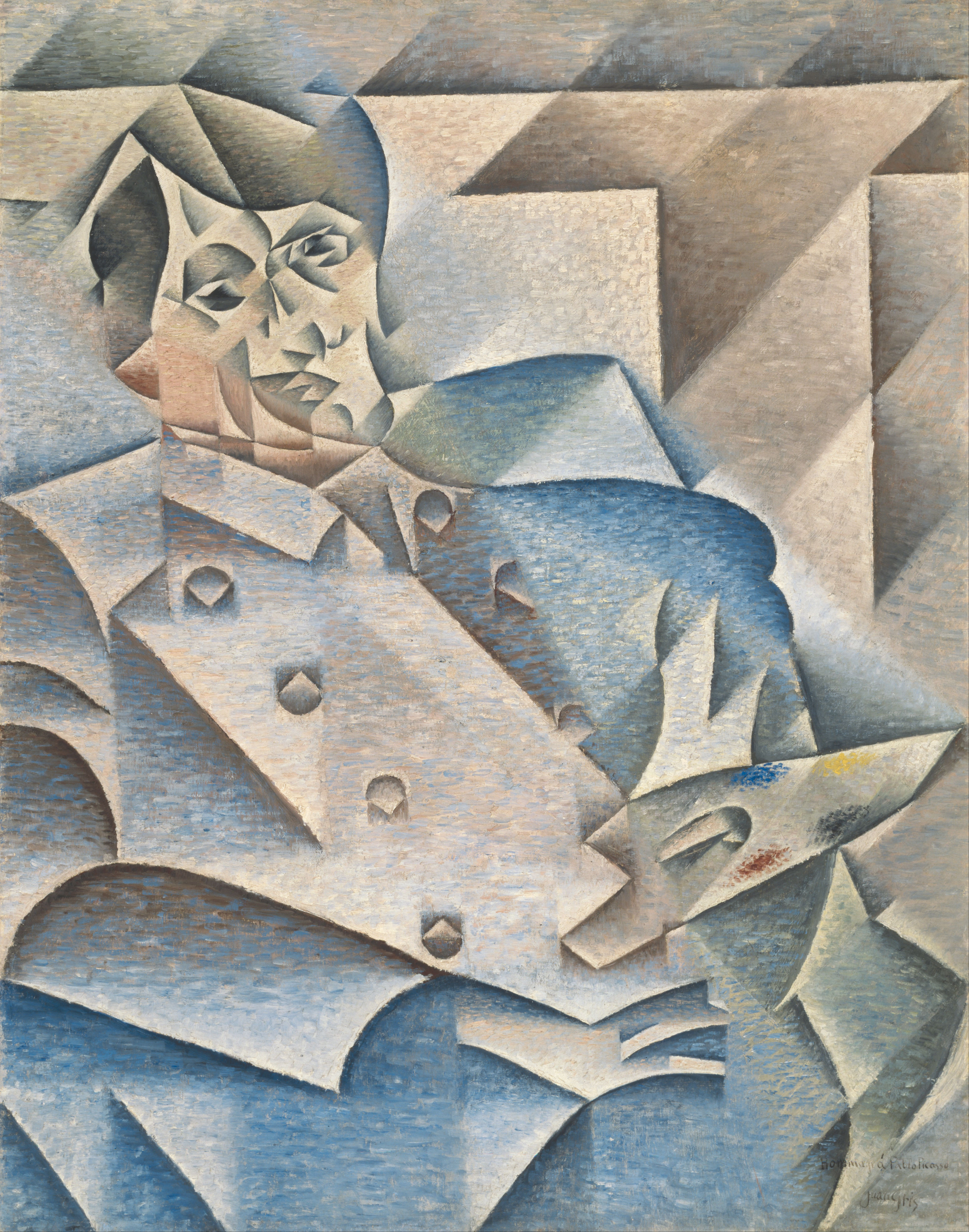
Juan Gris Portrait of Pablo Picasso (1912, Art Institute of Chicago)

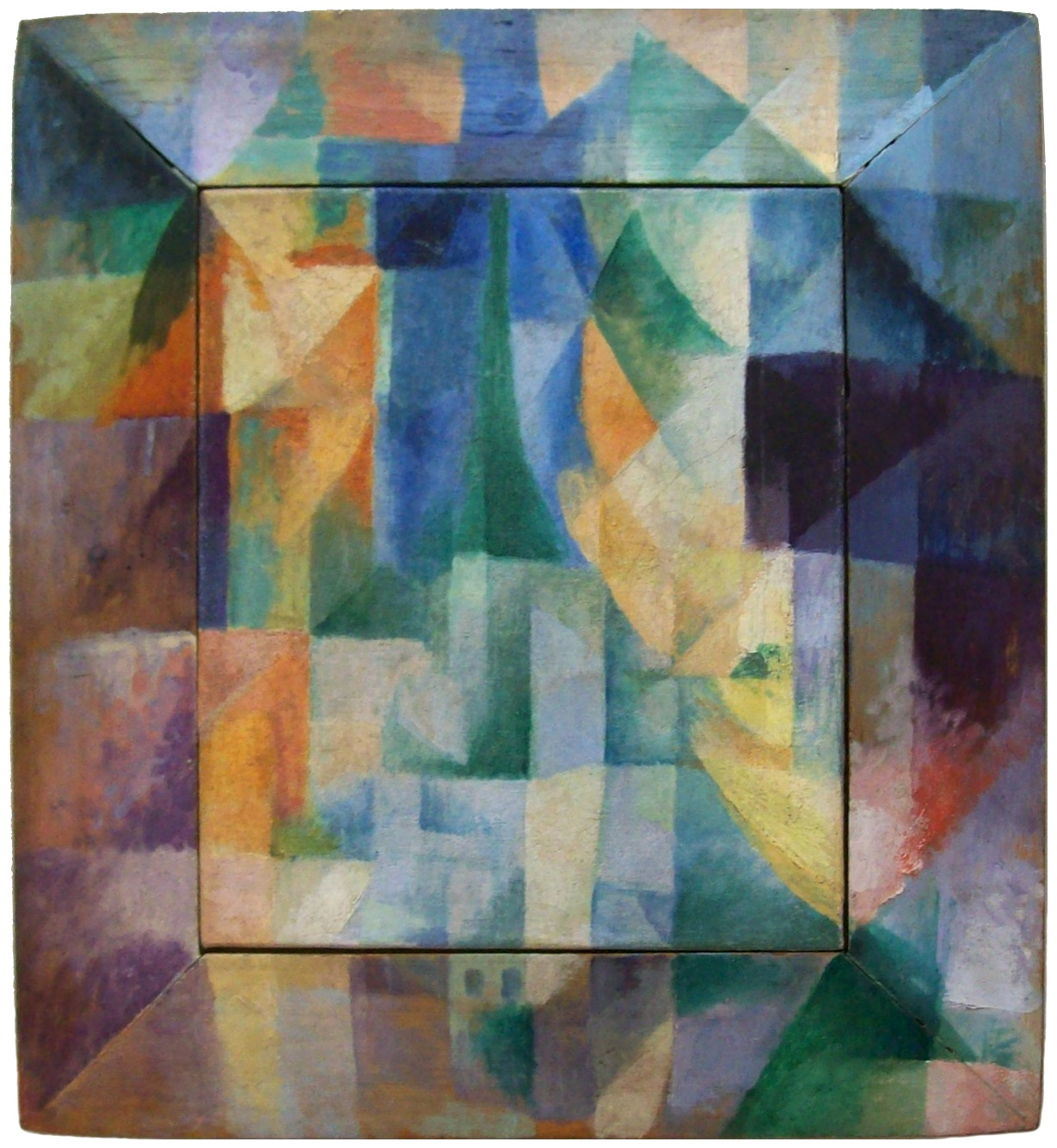
Robert Delaunay, Simultaneous Windows on the City (Orphism, 1912, Kunsthalle Hamburg)

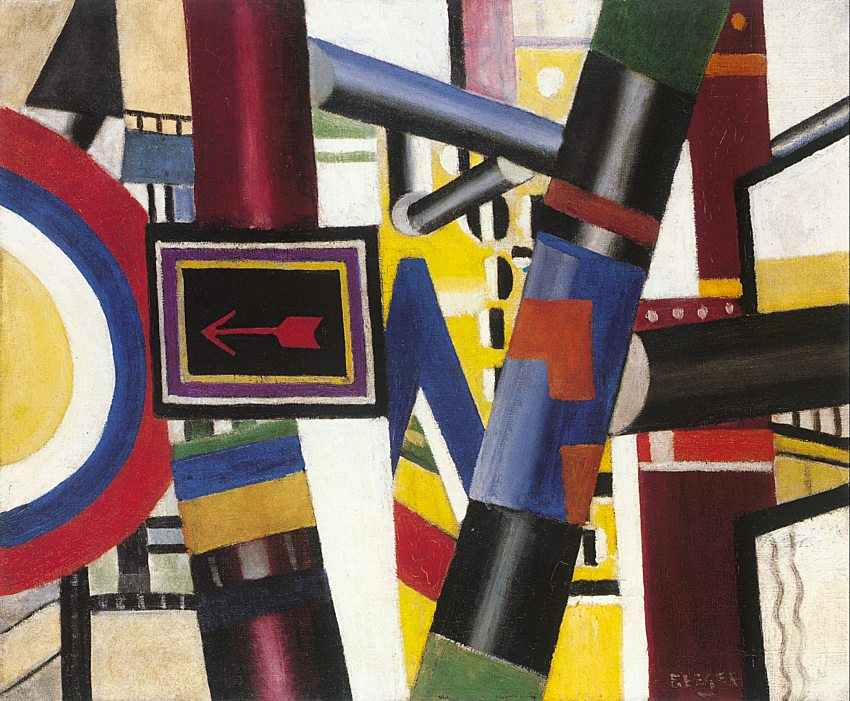
Fernand Léger Railway Crosing (Tubism, Synthetic Cubism, 1919, Art Institute of Chicago)

Pablo Picasso, Les Demoiselles d'Avignon (1907, MoMA). Violently painted prostitutes.

Pablo Picasso (1881–1973), often contrasted with Matisse, made Cubist paintings influenced by Cézanne, and Bernard, who added cubes to Cézanne's conception. Braque and Picasso jointly developed Cubism c. 1910, influencing several subsequent art movements. Picasso's Cubist period was preceded by blue, rose, and African.

Cubists include Marcel Duchamp (1887–1968), Alexander Archipenko (1887–1964), Joseph Csaky (1888–1971), and Henri Le Fauconnier (1881–1946). Synthetic cubism, contrasted with analytic cubism, is characterized by different textures, surfaces, collage elements, papier collé and a large variety of merged subject matter.

Cubists supported by Léonce Rosenberg (1879–1947) developed Crystal Cubism, including Albert Gleizes (1881–1953), Juan Gris (1887–1927), and Jean Metzinger (1883–1956). Fernand Léger (1881–1973) founded Tubism. Frenchman Robert Delaunay (1885–1941) and Czech František Kupka (1871–1957) established Orphism.

=== Expressionism ===
Image Gallery (Click "Show" to view)
Marc Chagall I and the Village (1911, Museum of Modern Art (MoMA))

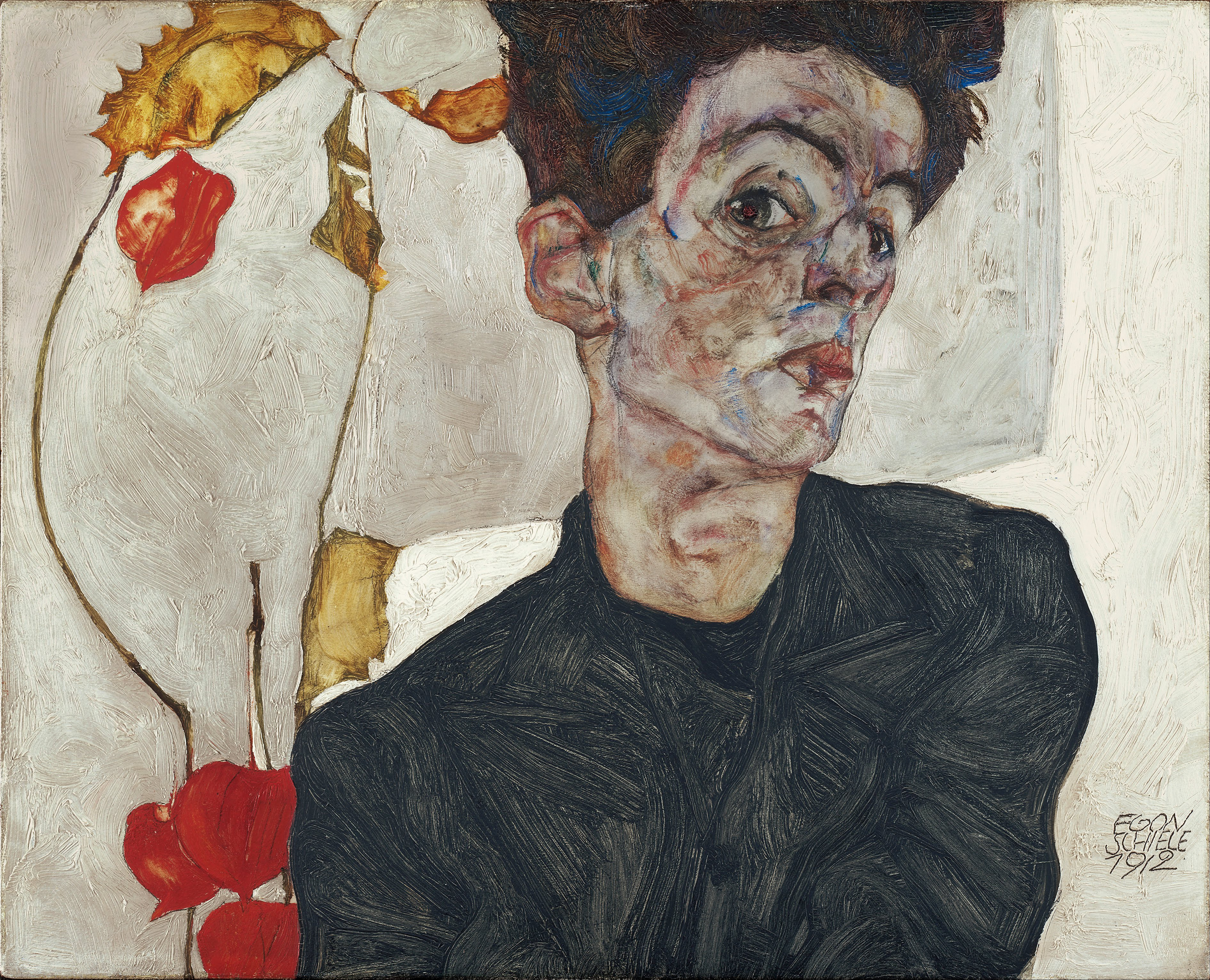
Egon Schiele, Self-Portrait with Physalis. (1912, Leopold Museum)

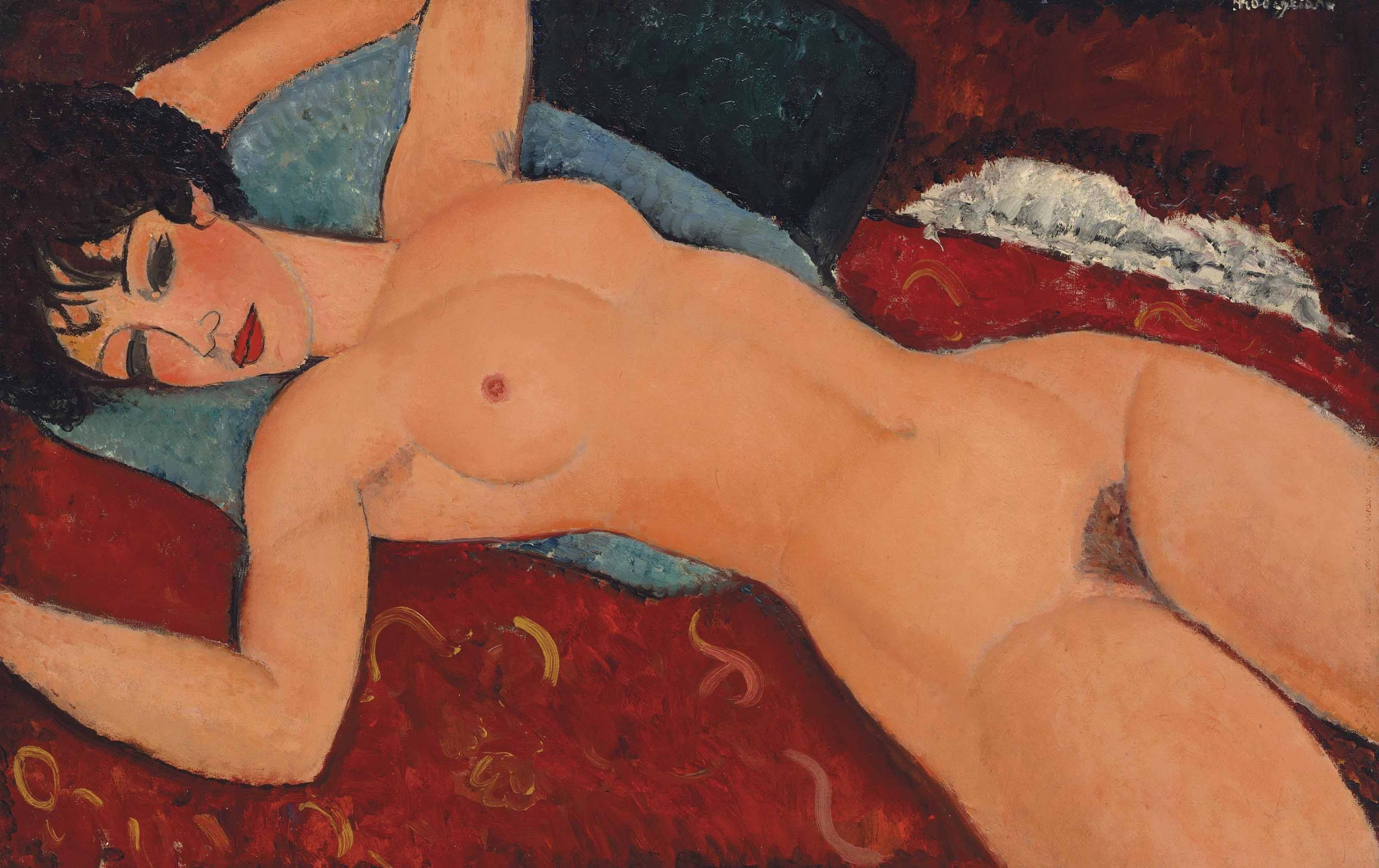
Amedeo Modigliani, Nu couché (1917, private collection of Liu Yiqian)

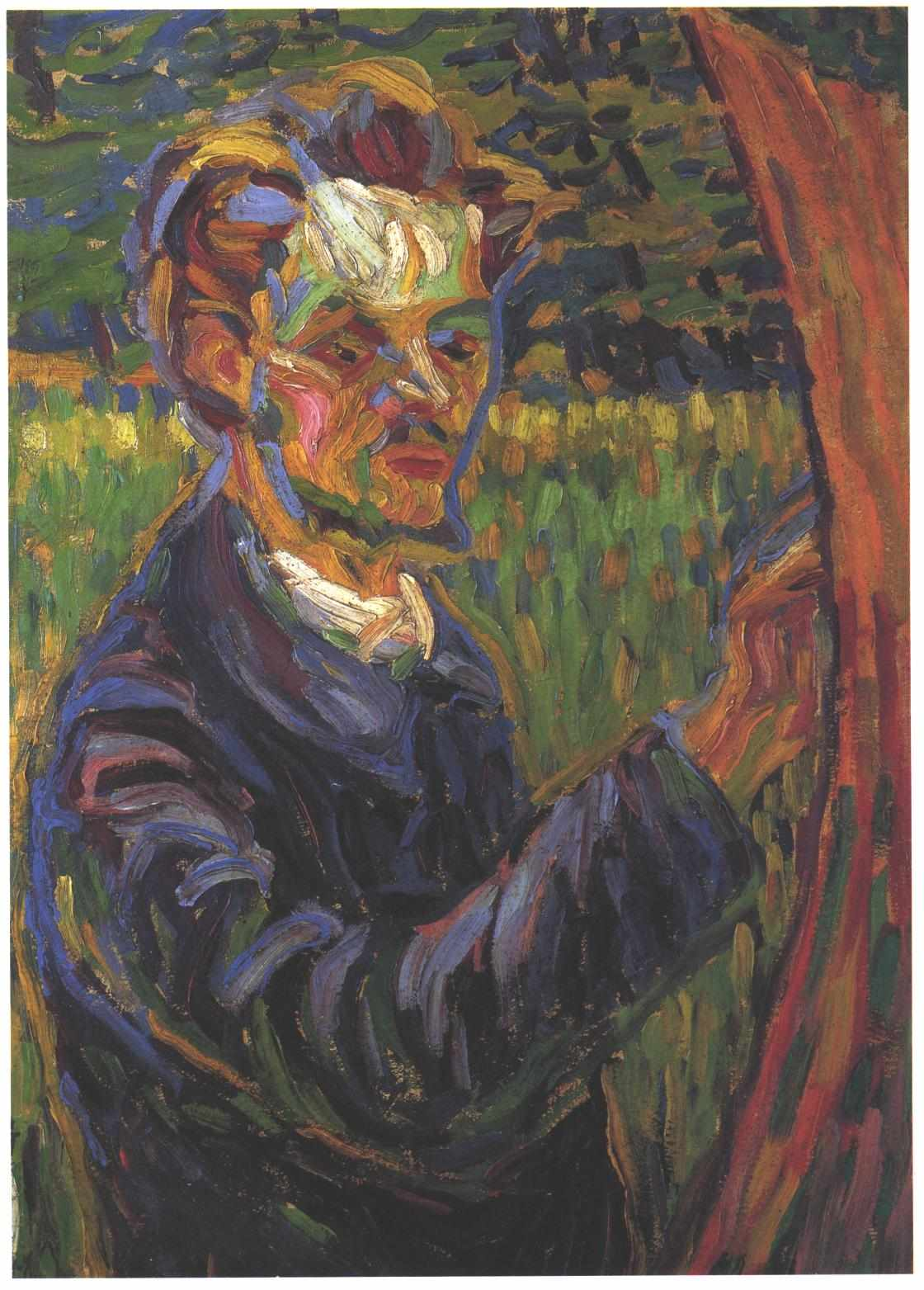
Ernst Ludwig Kirchner Portrait of Erich Heckel at the easel (Die Brücke, c. 1907, Pinakothek der Moderne)

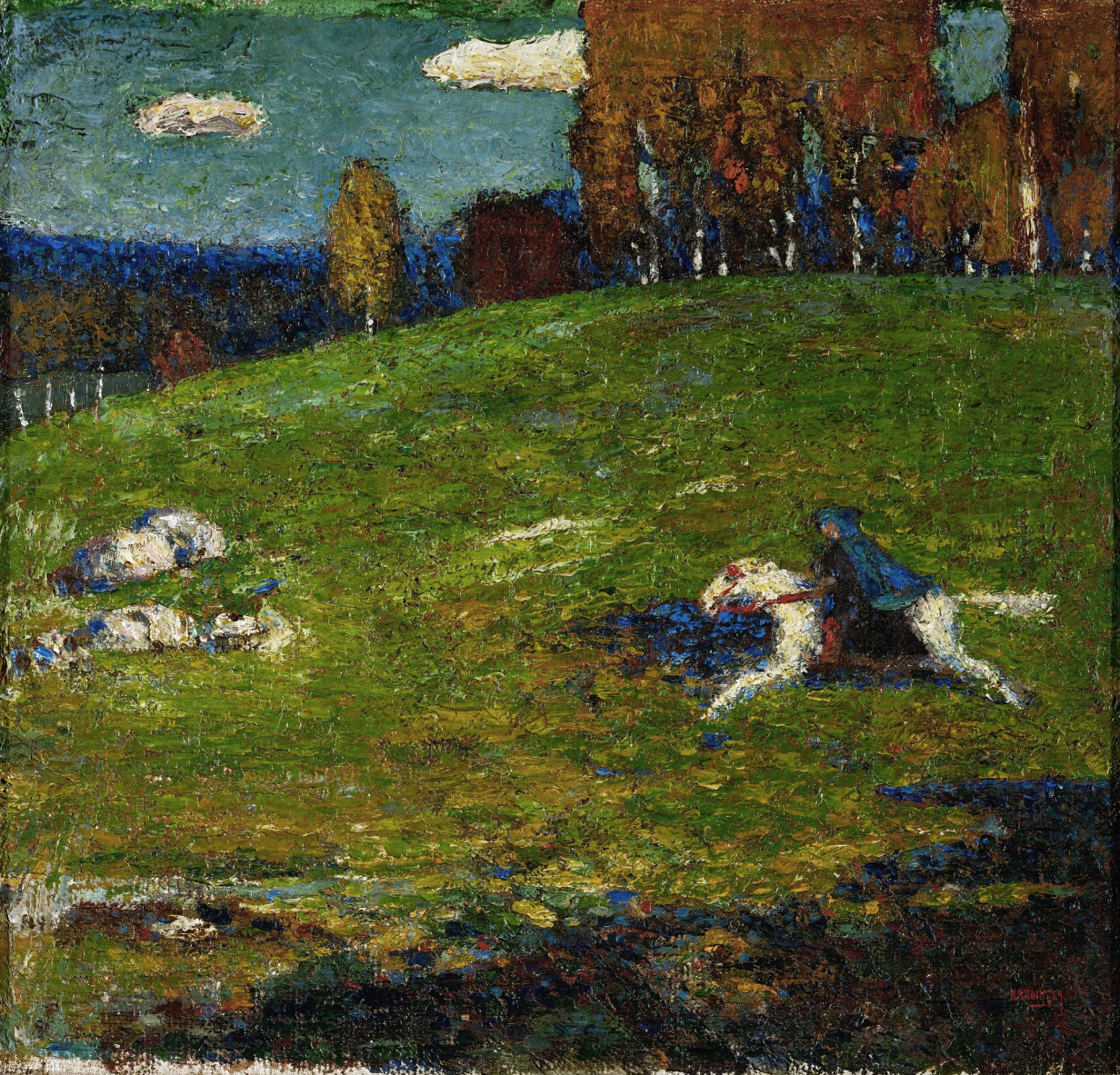
Wassily Kandinsky, Der Blaue Reiter (1903, private collection). Namesake of the movement. (Note: For Kandinsky, blue is the color of spirituality: the darker the blue, the more it awakens human desire for the eternal.)

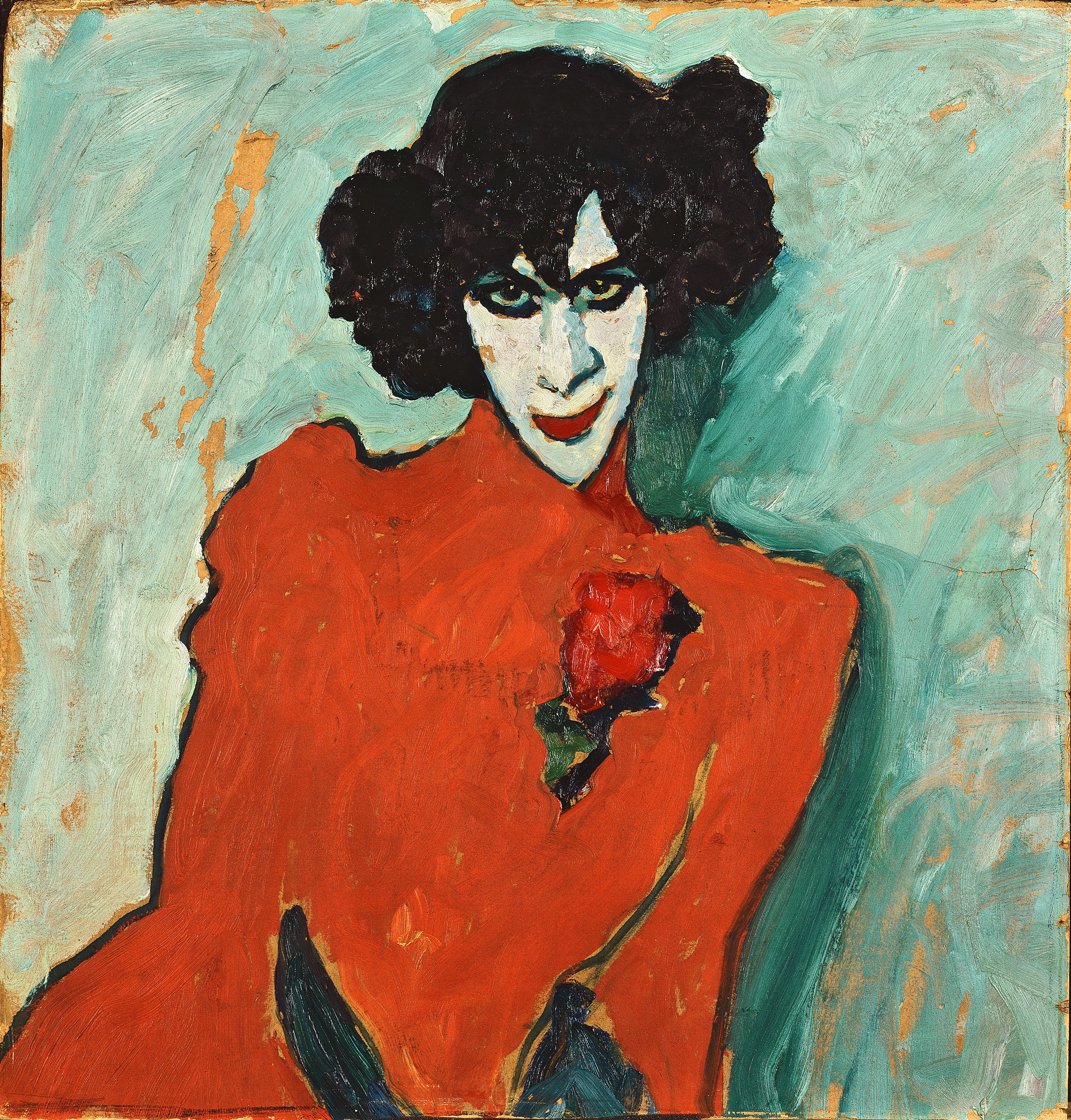
Alexej von Jawlensky, Portrait of Alexander Sakharoff (Der Blaue Reiter, 1909, Lenbachhaus)

Wassily Kandinsky, Last Judgment (1910, private collection). Der Blaue Reiter group formed in response to the rejection of this painting from an exhibition.

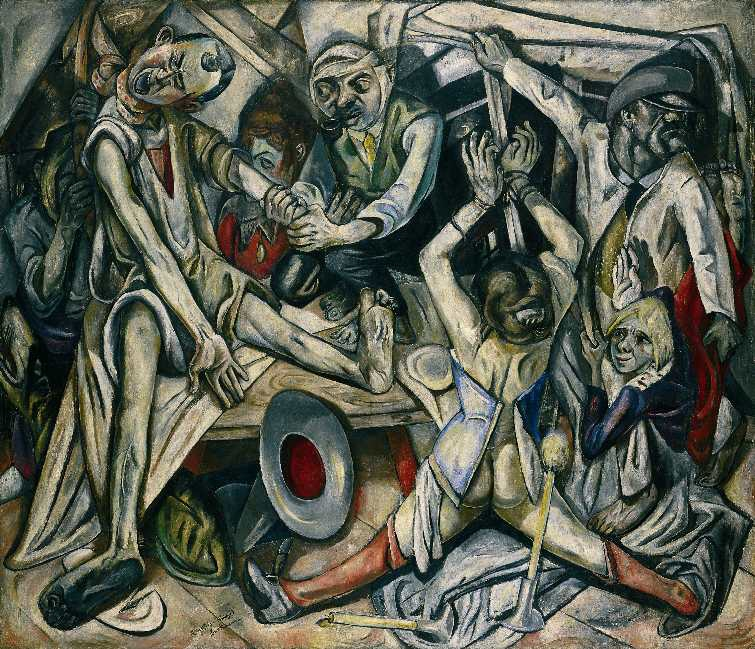
Max Beckmann, The Night (Neue Sachlichkeit, 1919, Kunstsammlung Nordrhein-Westfalen).

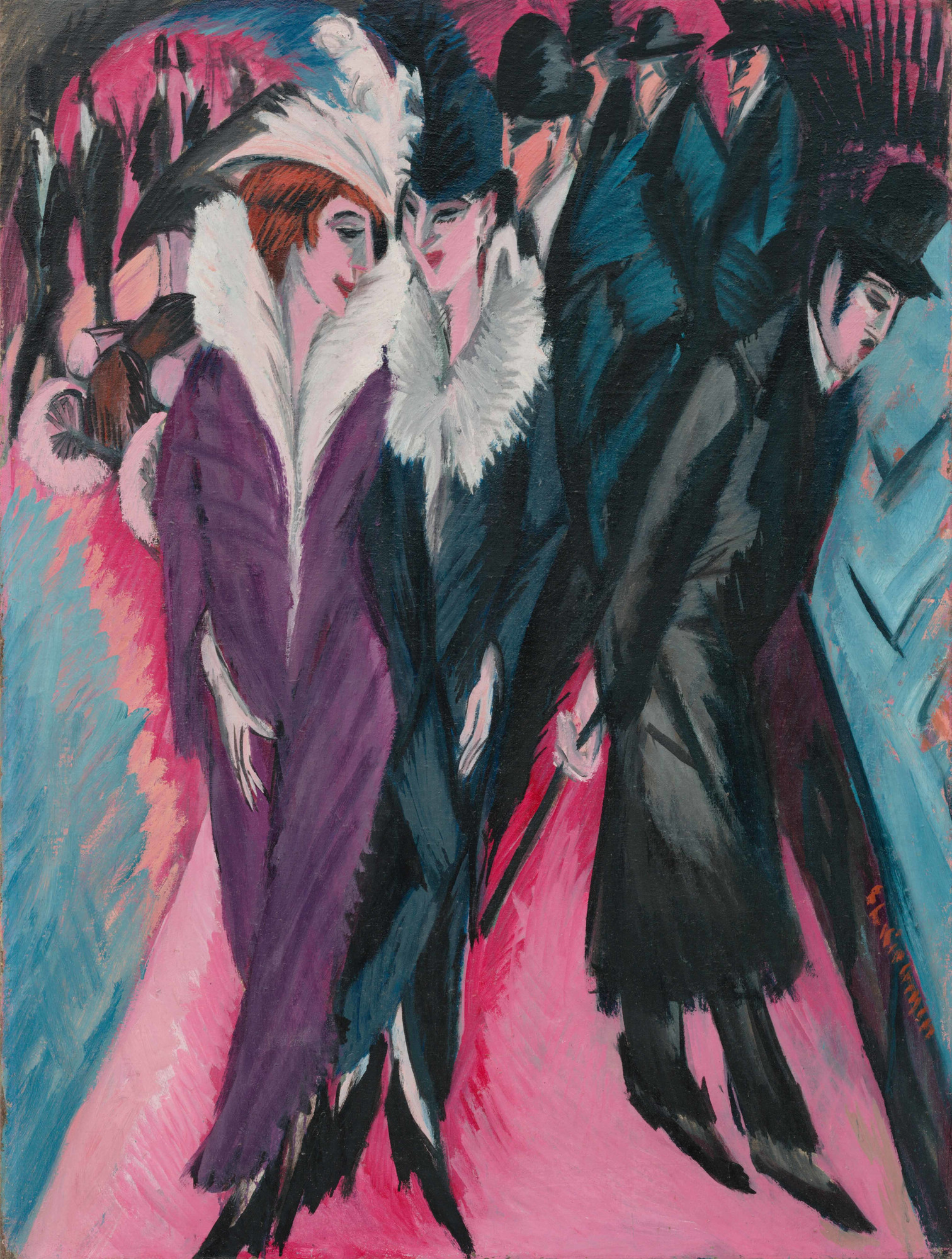
Ernst Ludwig Kirchner, Street, Berlin (Die Brücke, c. 1913, MoMA)

Influenced by symbolism, the expressionists were active largely between World War I (1914–1918) and World War II (1939–1945). They include Munch, German Max Beckmann (1884–1950), Austrians Oskar Kokoschka (1886–1980) and Egon Schiele (1890–1918), French painters Marc Chagall (1887–1985), Georges Rouault (1871–1958), and Chaïm Soutine (1893–1943), Belgian James Ensor (1860–1949), and Italian eclectic Amedeo Modigliani (1884–1920). Swiss Alberto Giacometti (1901–1966), primarily a sculptor, made intense landscape paintings.

Most expressionists were in Germany. In 1905, Die Brücke ("The Bridge") expressionist group formed in Dresden, including Fritz Bleyl (1880–1966), Erich Heckel (1883–1970), Ernst Ludwig Kirchner (1880–1938), Emil Nolde (1867–1956), and Karl Schmidt-Rottluff (1884–1976). Later members included Max Pechstein (1881–1955) and Otto Mueller (1874–1930).

The German expressionist Der Blaue Reiter ("The Blue Rider") movement lacked a manifesto, but lasted from 1911 to 1914, centered around Wassily Kandinsky (1866–1944) and Franz Marc (1880–1916), and also included Lyonel Feininger (1871–1956), August Macke (1887–1914), Gabriele Münter (1877–1962), and Marianne von Werefkin (1860–1938), as well as Swiss Paul Klee and Russian Alexej von Jawlensky (1864–1941).

==== Neue Sachlichkeit ====
The reaction against expressionism during the interwar Weimar Republic and Great Depression spawned political and satirical Neue Sachlichkeit ("New Objectivity"), including painters Beckmann, Otto Dix (1891–1969), and George Grosz (1893–1959).

=== Abstract art ===
Image Gallery (Click "Show" to view)
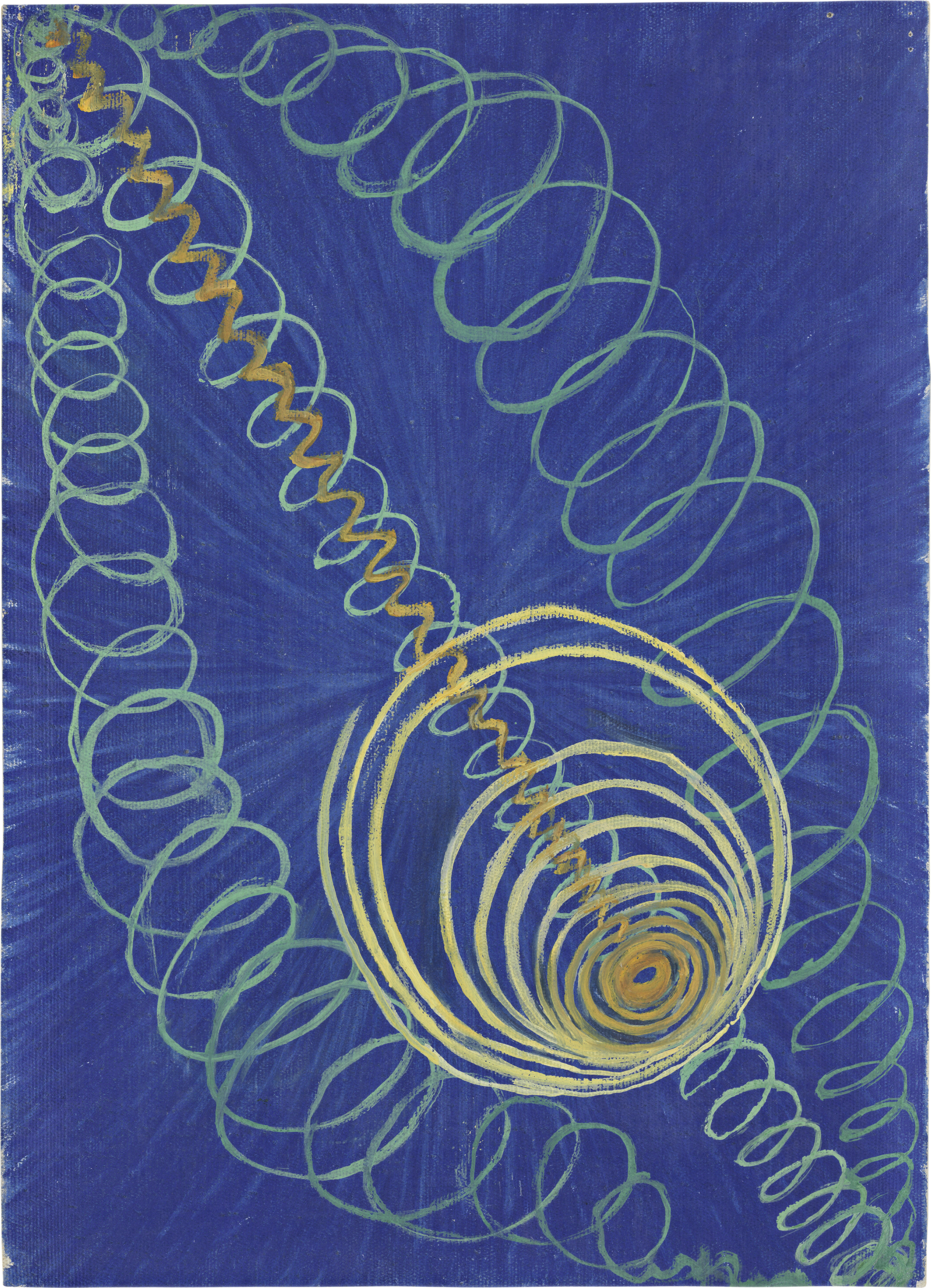
Hilma af Klint, Primordial Chaos No. 16 (1907, Hilma af Klint Foundation)

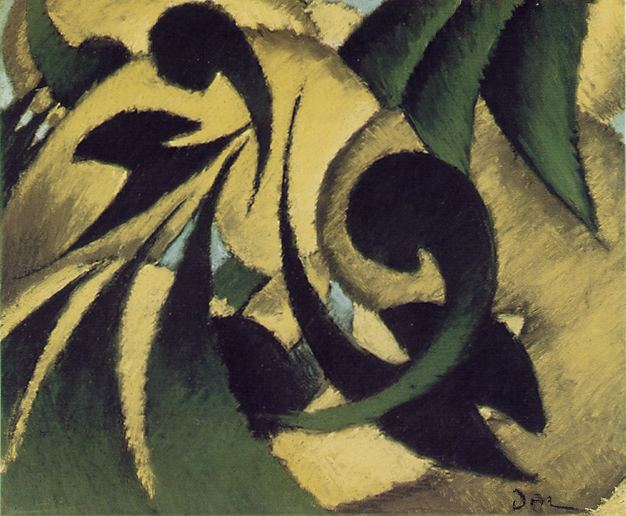
Arthur Dove, Nature Symbolized (1911, Art Institute of Chicago)

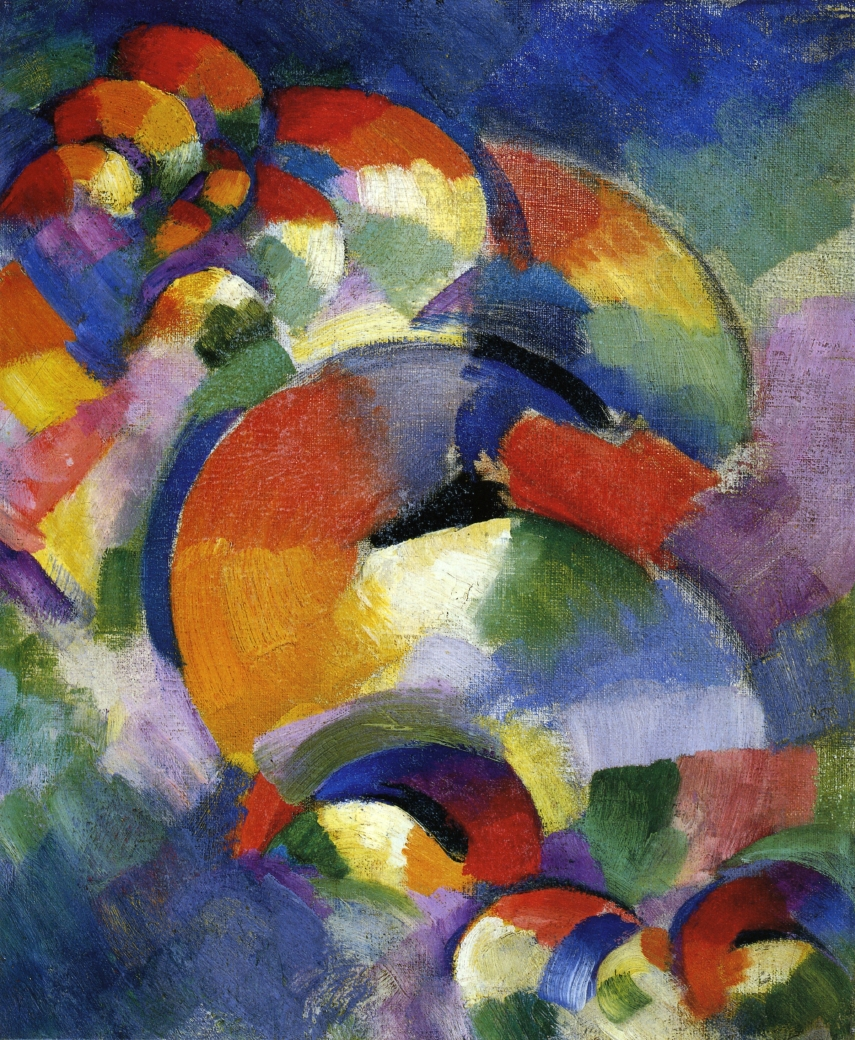
Morgan Russell, Cosmic Synchromy (Synchromism, 1914, Munson-Williams-Proctor Arts Institute)

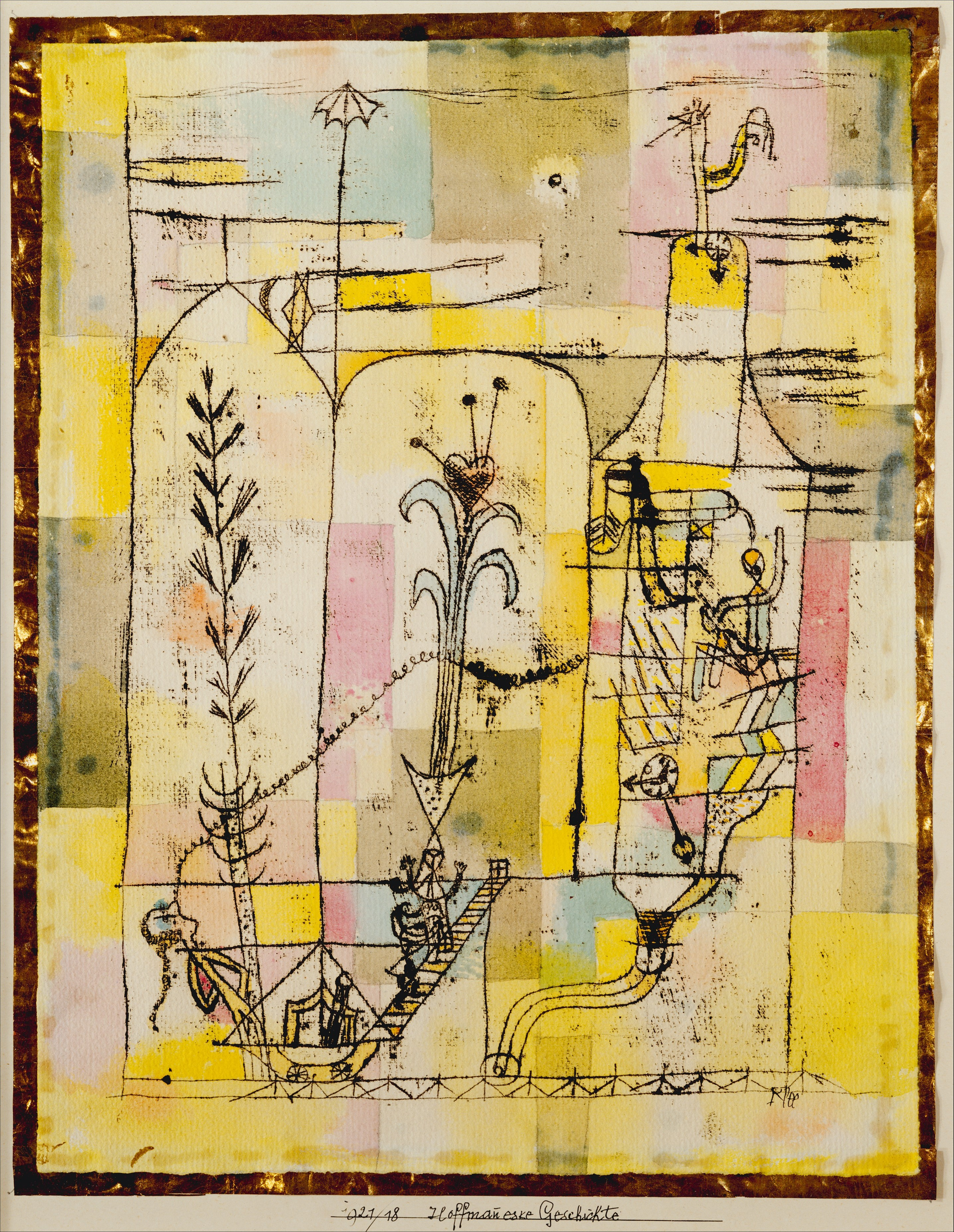
Paul Klee, Tale à la Hoffmann (Bauhaus, 1921, Metropolitan Museum of Art)

Wassily Kandinsky, Composition VII (1913, Tretyakov Gallery)

Kandinsky is one of the first modern painters of abstract art. As an early modernist, he theorized, as did contemporary occultists and theosophists like Madame Blavatsky (1831–1891), that pure visual abstraction had corollary vibrations with sound and music. They posited that pure abstraction could express pure spirituality, and Kandinsky penned Concerning the Spiritual in Art (1911). Other abstract art pioneers include Klee, Swede Hilma af Klint (1862–1944), and Russian Kazimir Malevich (1879–1935).

Malevich founded suprematism, an abstract art based on "the supremacy of pure artistic feeling" rather than on the figurative depiction of real-life subject, notable for influencing monochrome painting. Russians Vladimir Tatlin (1885–1953) and Alexander Rodchenko (1891–1956) founded the industrial and urban abstract art of constructivism, influencing the Bauhaus painters.

Delauney's orphism influenced abstract painting with his bold use of color and his experimentation of both depth and tone. Arthur Dove (1880–1946) is the first American abstract painter. Synchromists such as Morgan Russell (1886–1953) similarly were influenced by color's relation to music.

==== De Stijl ====
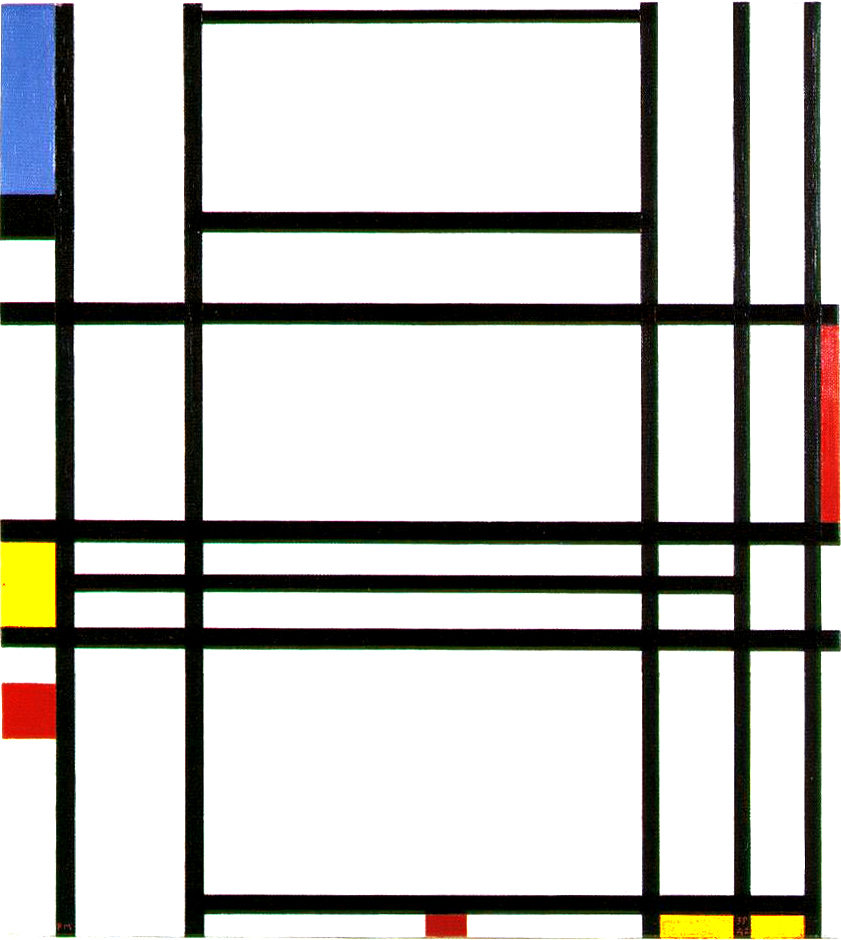
Piet Mondrian, Composition No. 10 (1942, private collection)

De Stijl, also known as neoplasticism, was a Dutch artistic movement founded in 1917, including theosophist Piet Mondrian (1872–1944), Theo van Doesburg (1883–1931), Vilmos Huszár (1884–1960), and Bart van der Leck (1876–1958). (Note: De Stijl was also the name of a journal that was published by van Doesburg propagating the group's theories.)

De Stijl was influenced by Cubism and neoplatonic mystic mathematician M. H. J. Schoenmaekers's (1875–1944) beliefs, such as ideal geometric forms (e. g. the "perfectly straight line"). It expressed a utopian ideal of spiritual harmony and order, advocating pure, universal abstraction reduced to the essentials of form and colour, simplifying painting to vertical and horizontal lines, using only primary colors, black, and white. (Note: Mondrian writes in his essay "Neo-Plasticism in Pictorial Art": "... this new plastic idea will ignore the particulars of appearance, that is to say, natural form and colour. On the contrary, it should find its expression in the abstraction of form and colour, that is to say, in the straight line and the clearly defined primary colour.")

==== Bauhaus ====
In Europe, Bonnard and Matisse continued developing their narrative styles independent of any movement. The modernist Bauhaus movement saw painters influenced by De Stijl and constructivism like Kandinsky, Klee, and Josef Albers (1888–1976) utilized geometric shapes and balance.

=== American modernism ===
Image Gallery (Click "Show" to view)
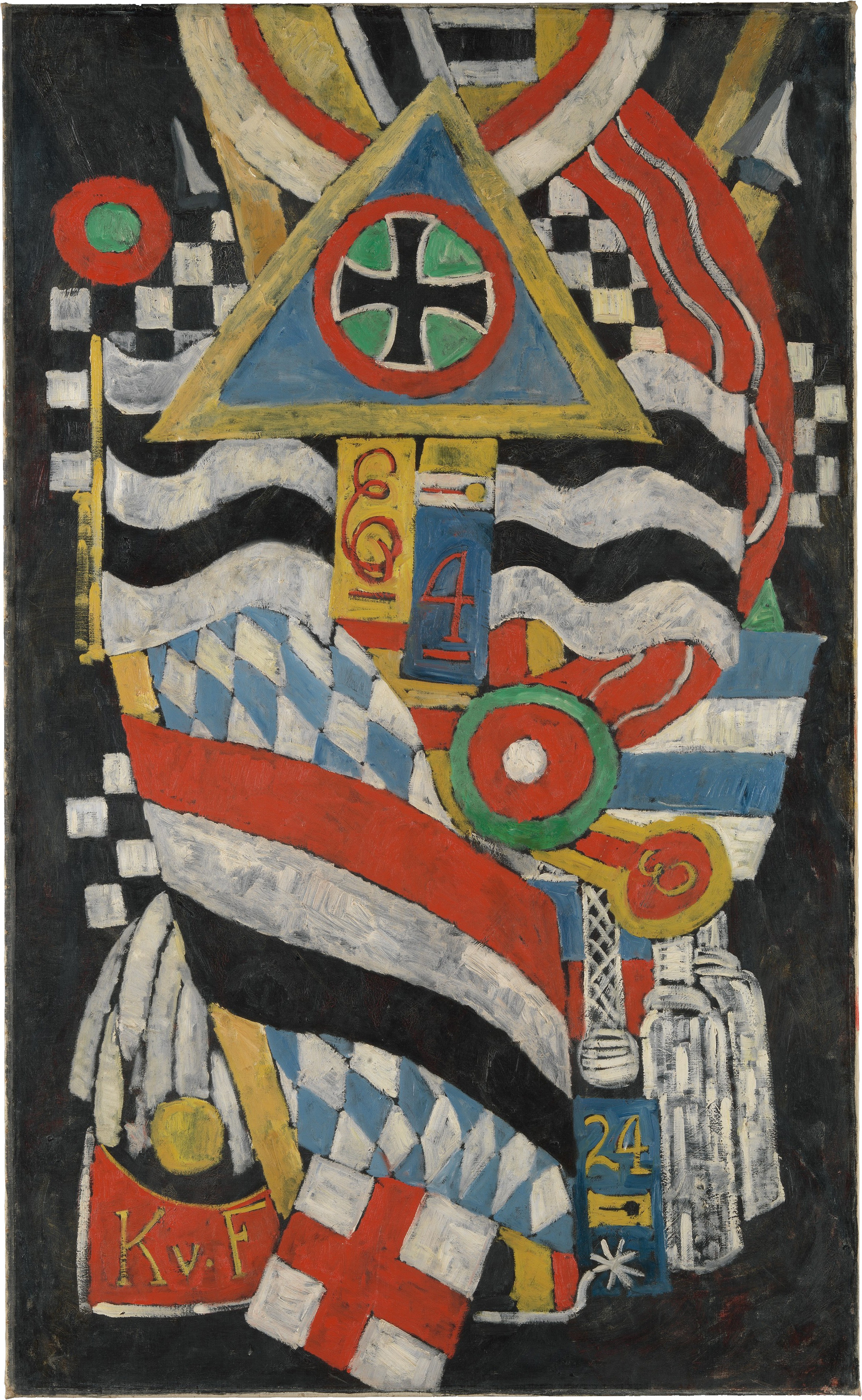
Marsden Hartley Portrait of a German Officer (1914, Metropolitan Museum of Art)

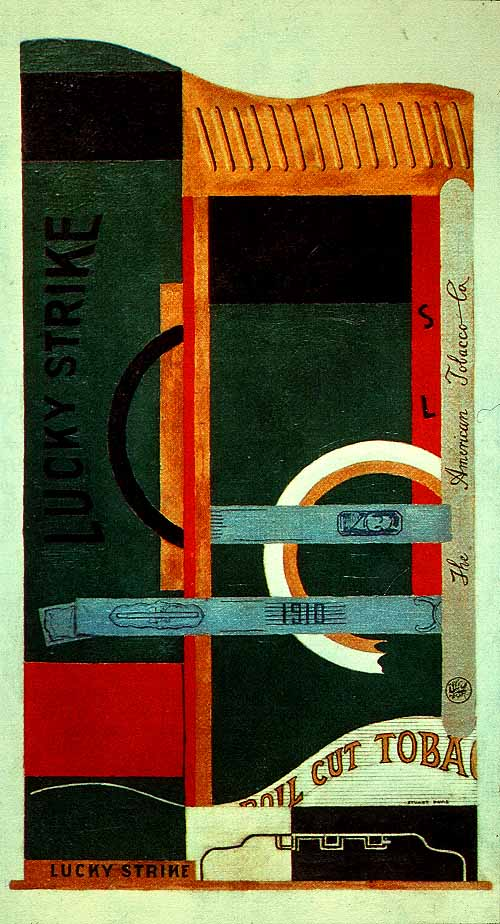
Stuart Davis Lucky Strike (1921, MoMA)

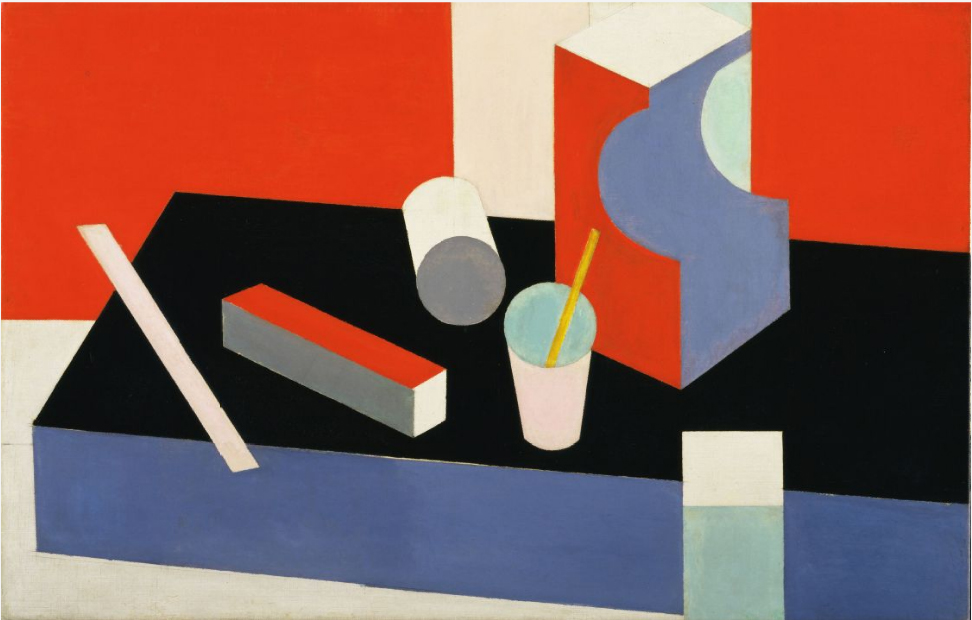
Patrick Henry Bruce Painting (1930, MoMA)

American modernist painters during the period between World War I and World War II tended to go to Europe for recognition. Marsden Hartley (1877–1943), Stuart Davis (1884–1950), Patrick Henry Bruce (1881–1936), and Gerald Murphy (1888–1964) created reputations abroad. Mystic Hartley, and Stuart Davis, experimented with expressionism, while Bruce created Cubist related paintings.

During the 1920s, photographer Alfred Stieglitz (1864–1946) exhibited Dove, Georgia O'Keeffe (1887–1986), Alfred Henry Maurer (1868–1932), Charles Demuth (1883–1935), John Marin (1870–1953) and other artists including Europeans Matisse, Rodin, Rousseau, Cézanne, and Picasso, at his New York City gallery the 291.

=== Futurism ===
The Futurism art movement glorified modernity and "aimed to liberate Italy from the weight of its past." The futurists were founded by poet Filippo Tommaso Marinetti (1876–1944), and included painters Umberto Boccioni (1882–1916), Carlo Carrà (1881–1966), Fortunato Depero (1876–1944), Gino Severini (1883–1966), Giacomo Balla (1871–1958), and Luigi Russolo (1885–1947).

=== Dada and Surrealism ===
Image Gallery (Click "Show" to view)
Giorgio de Chirico The Song of Love (proto-Surrealism, 1914, MoMA)

Marcel Duchamp The Bride Stripped Bare by Her Bachelors, Even, or The Large Glass (Dada, c. 1923, Philadelphia Museum of Art)

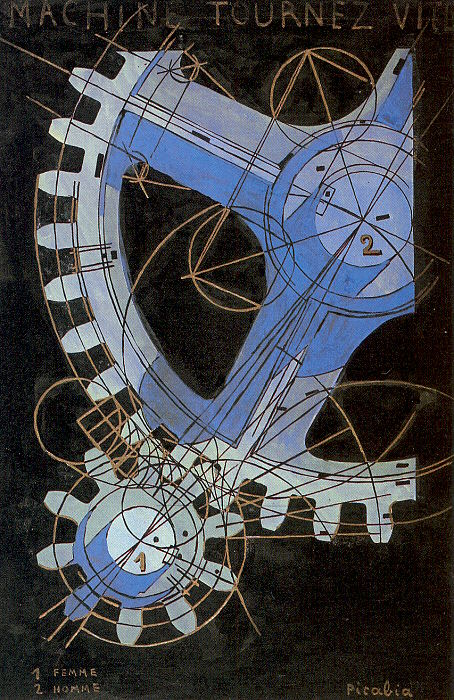
Francis Picabia Machine Turn Quickly (Dada, 1916, private collection)

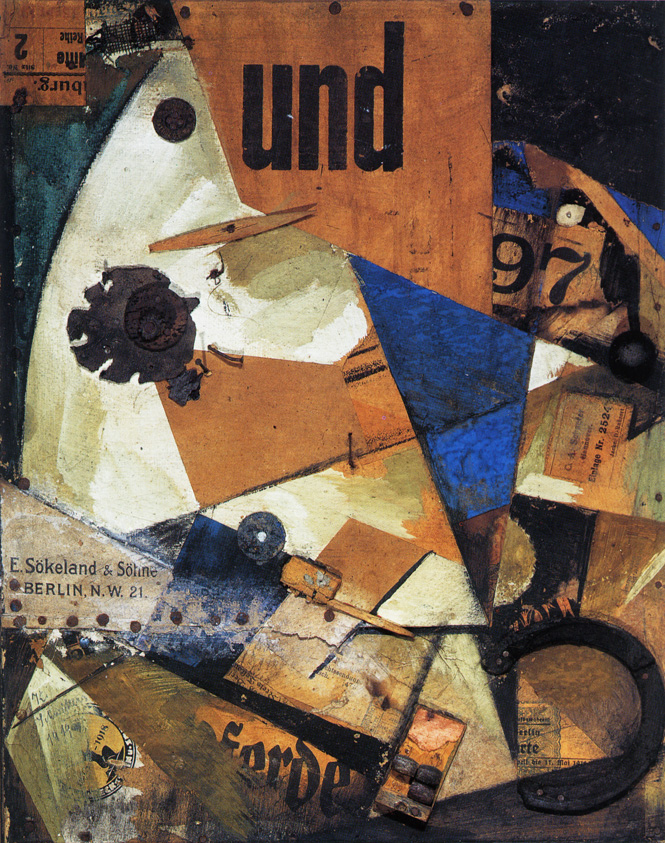
Kurt Schwitters, The Und-Picture (Dada, 1919, Staatsgalerie Stuttgart) Painted collage.

Hannah Höch Cut with the Kitchen Knife through the Last Epoch of Weimar Beer-Belly Culture in Germany (Dada, 1919, Nationalgalerie). Collage.

André Masson Pedestal Table in the Studio (Surrealism, 1922, Tate Modern)

Joan Miró, The Tilled Field (Surrealism, 1924, Guggenheim).

Marcel Duchamp, Nude Descending a Staircase, No. 2 (1912, Philadelphia Museum of Art). Exhibited at 1913 Armory Show.

Marcel Duchamp (1887–1968) came to international prominence after the 1913 New York City Armory Show. He combined Cubism and Futurism, pursuing art's limits using part painting, part collage, part construction.

Duchamp became closely associated with the Dada movement started in neutral Zürich during World War I. (Note: By 1923, Duchamp renounced artmaking for chess.) Dada primarily advanced its antiwar politic by anti-art, rejecting prevailing art standards. Other Dada painters include Francis Picabia (1879–1953), Man Ray (1890–1976), Kurt Schwitters (1887–1948), Hannah Höch (1889–1978), Tristan Tzara (1896–1963), Hans Richter (1888–1976), Jean (1886–1966) and Sophie Taeuber-Arp (1889–1943).

Giorgio de Chirico (1888–1978) moved to Paris, joining his brother Alberto Savinio (1891–1952), who knew Laprade, a jury member of the Salon d'Automne, which exhibited his mysterious and dreamlike works, instrumental to beginning Surrealism. During 1913 his work was exhibited at the Salon des Indépendants and Salon d'Automne, noticed by Picasso and Guillaume Apollinaire (1880–1918) among others.

Several Dadaists, such as Duchamp and Picabia, were associated with Surrealism and the avant-garde. Surrealists emphasizing spontaneous, automatic or subconscious creation like the Arps, Masson, Miró, and Max Ernst (1891–1976) were influential, especially in America. Ernst studied Sigmund Freud (1856–1939) and the alternative realities experienced by the insane.

Surrealists Yves Tanguy (1900–1955), René Magritte (1898–1967) (Note: Magritte painted The Treachery of Images (Surrealism, 1929, LACMA). Its paradoxical tagline "This is not a pipe" is the subject of a 1973 Michel Foucault book.) and Salvador Dalí (1904–1989) (Note: Dalí painted The Persistence of Memory (Surrealism, 1931, MoMA). His best known work, the melting clocks.) used realistic depictions of fantastic imagination and dream imagery, creating some of the best known surrealist paintings. Bernard Delvaille (1931–2006) has described Magritte's surrealism as "Symbolism plus Freud".

Max Ernst, Men Shall Know Nothing of This (Surrealism, 1923, Tate Liverpool). (Note: Ernst was possibly inspired by Freud's psychoanalysis and study of the delusions of paranoiac Daniel Paul Schreber (1842–1911). Freud identified Schreber's fantasy of becoming a woman as a castration complex. The image of two pairs of legs refers to Schreber's hermaphroditic desires. Ernst's inscription on the back of the painting reads: The picture is curious because of its symmetry. The two sexes balance one another.)

André Breton (1896–1966) published the Surrealist Manifesto (1924), (Note: Georges Bataille (1897–1962) was a surrealist philosopher, author of Story of the Eye (1928).) and purchased the paintings of Joan Miró (1893–1983), influenced by André Masson (1896–1987); and organized the British Surrealist Group's 1936 London International Surrealist Exhibition. Other prominent surrealist painters include Méret Oppenheim (1913–1985), Toyen (1902–1980), Grégoire Michonze (1902–1982), Roberto Matta (1911–2002), Kay Sage (1898–1963), Leonora Carrington (1917–2001), Dorothea Tanning (1910–2012), and Leonor Fini (1907–1996).

Left-wing politics and radicalism characterized many of the artists connected to Surrealism. Picasso supported the revolutionaries during the Spanish Civil War (1936–1939). (Note: Picasso painted Guernica (1937, Museo Nacional Centro de Arte Reina Sofía), commemorating the bombing of the Basque town of Gernika by the Condor Legion of Nazi Germany's Luftwaffe. While first exhibited elsewhere, in accord with Picasso's wish to give the painting to the people of Spain as a gift, it was sent to Spain in 1981.) In Paris the Lettrists broke off from Dada and Surrealism and influenced the situationists.

=== Neo romanticism ===
Balthus (1908–2001), who blended of surrealism and realism, is sometimes classified as a neo-romantic, Romantic revival painters often expressing wartime anxiety, including Englishmen Paul Nash (1889–1946), Graham Sutherland (1903–1980), John Piper (1903–1992), and Ivon Hitchens (1893–1979); Frenchman Christian Bérard (1902–1949), and Russians like the Berman brothers and Pavel Tchelitchew (1898–1957).

=== 20th-century realism ===
Image Gallery (Click "Show" to view)
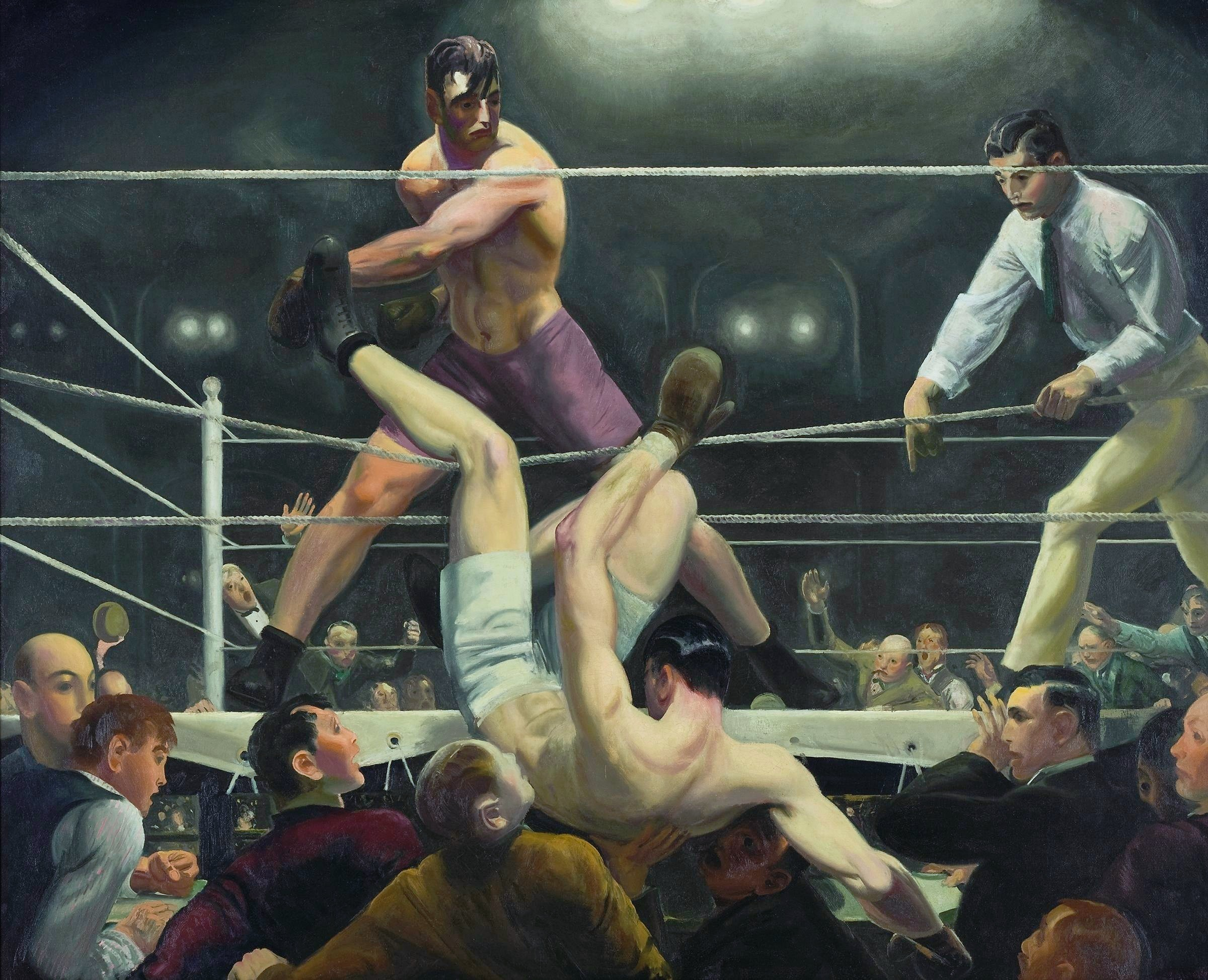
George Bellows Dempsey and Firpo (1924, Whitney Museum of American Art)

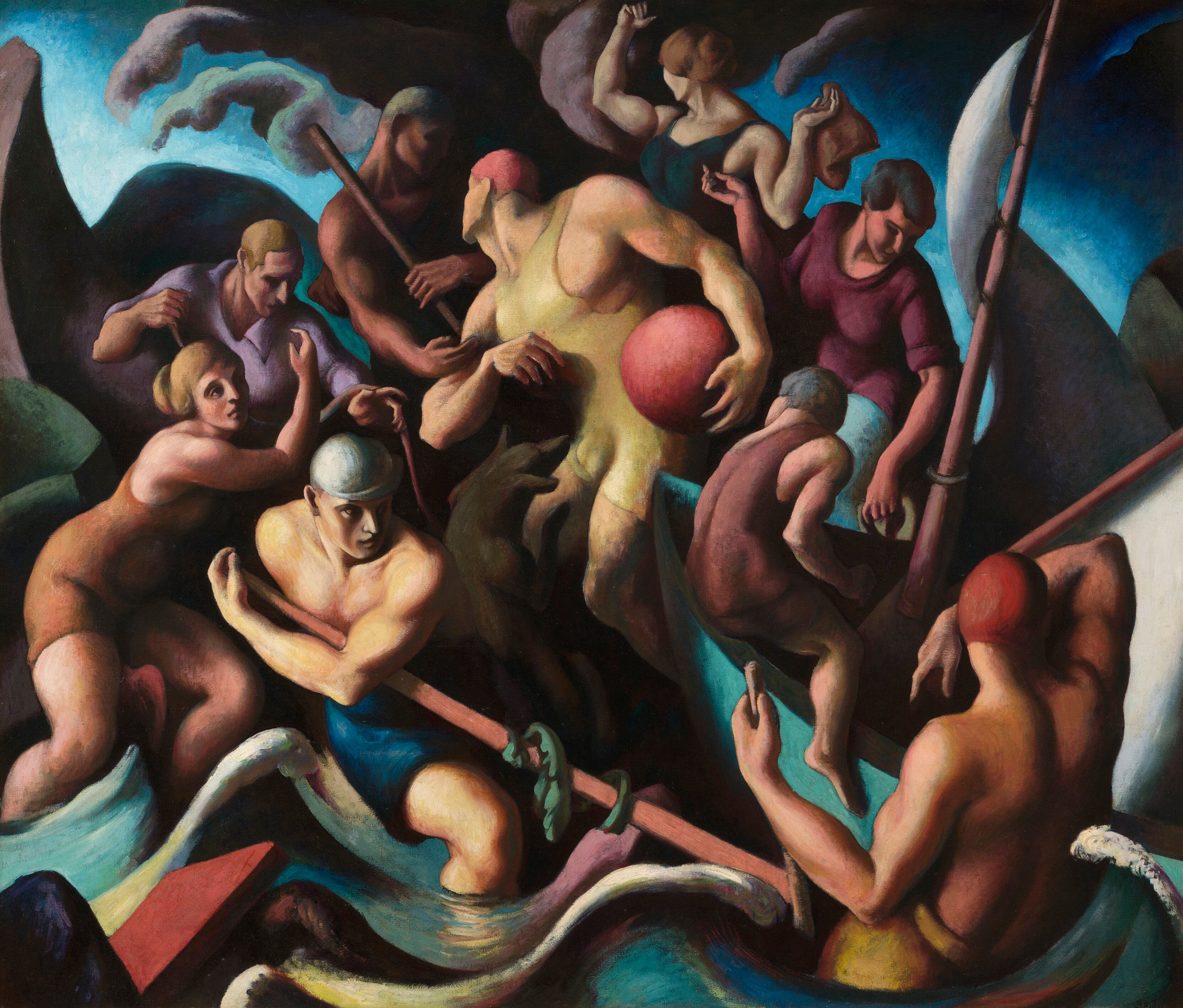
Thomas Hart Benton People of Chilmark (Regionalism, 1920, Hirshhorn Museum and Sculpture Garden)

Charles Demuth Spring, (Precisionism, 1921, Art Institute of Chicago)

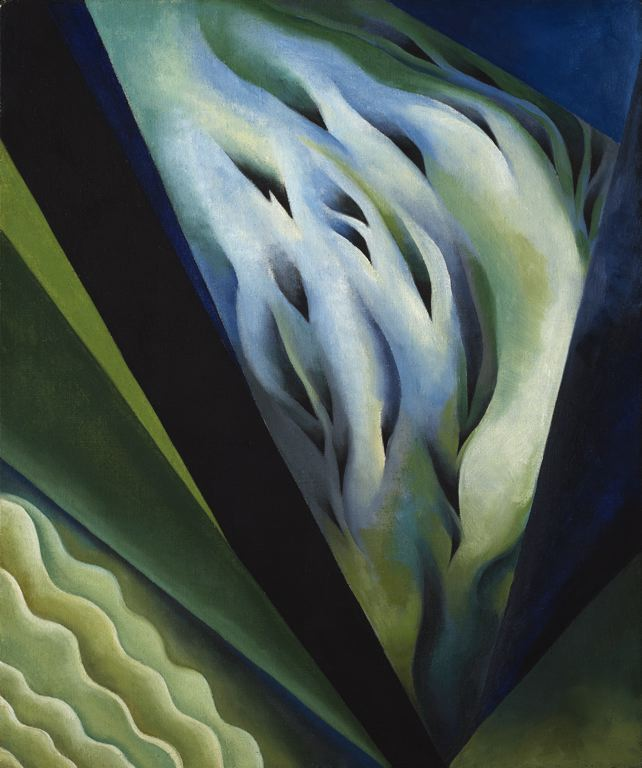
Georgia O'Keeffe Blue and Green Music (1921, Art Institute of Chicago)

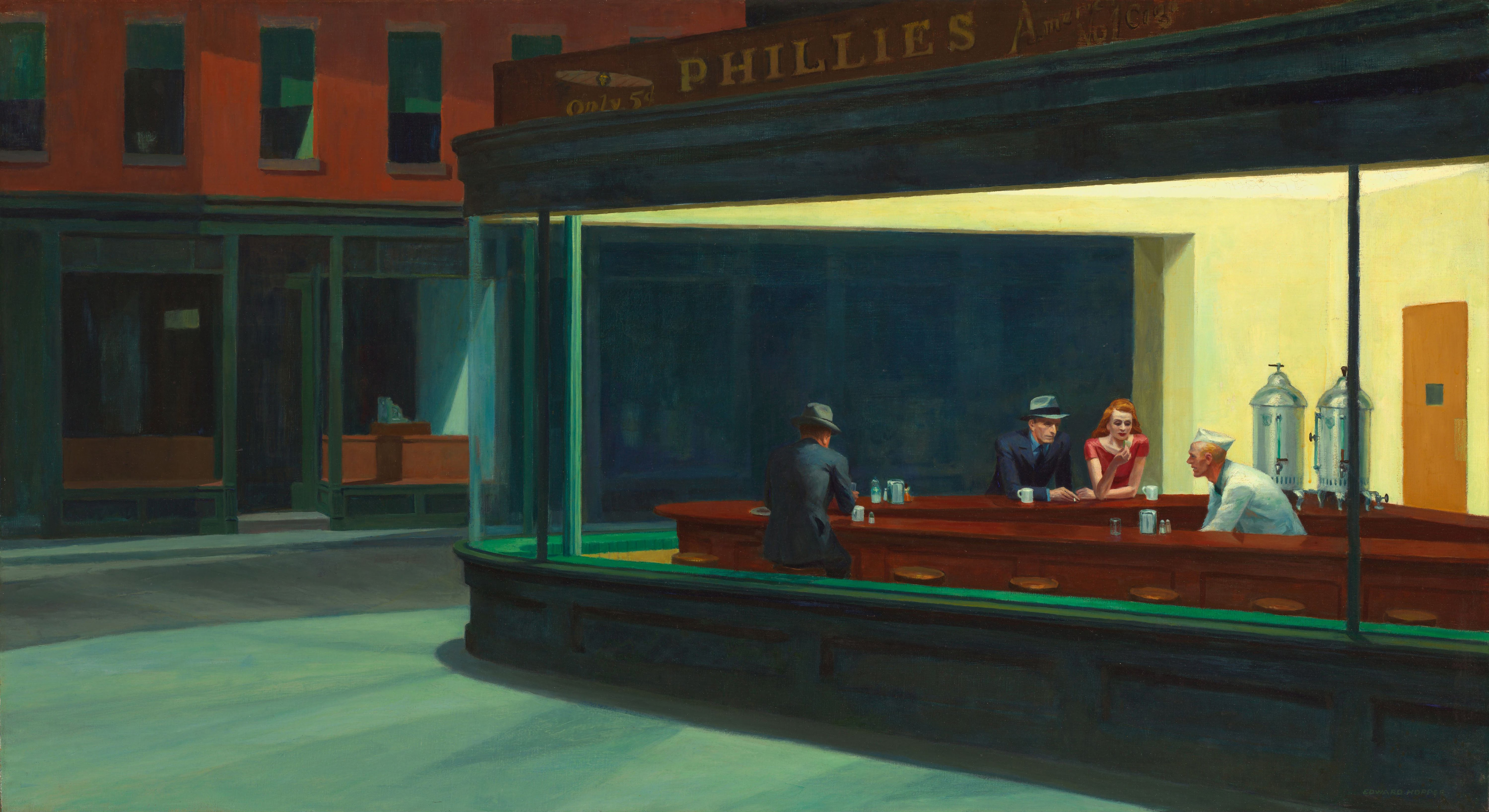
Edward Hopper, 1942, Nighthawks (American Scene painting, 1942, Art Institute of Chicago)

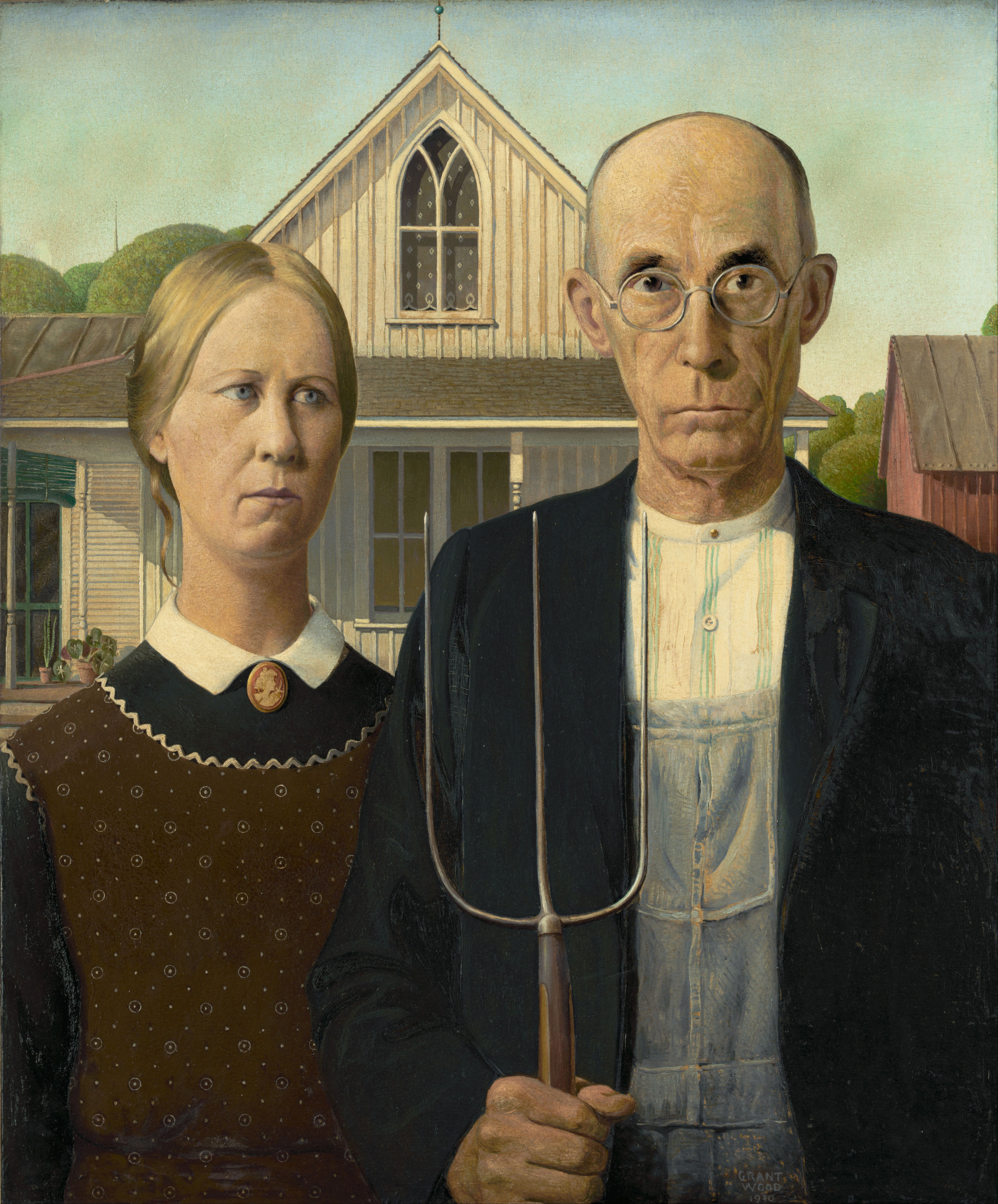
Grant Wood, American Gothic (Social Realism, 1930, Art Institute of Chicago) (Note: The house in the background is Carpenter Gothic style. One of the most familiar images in 20th-century American art, art critics assumed it was intended as satirical; but it was part of a literary trend depicting rural America critically, such as Winesburg, Ohio (1919) by Sherwood Anderson (1876–1941), Main Street (1920) by Sinclair Lewis (1885–1951), and The Tattooed Countess by Carl Van Vechten (1880–1964). After the Great Depression, the painting was seen as a depiction of steadfast American pioneer spirit.)

American realism remained influential with painters like George Bellows (1882–1925), and from the Great Depression through the years of World War II and beyond, American art was characterized by Regionalism, Social Realism, and American Scene Painting, including, Thomas Hart Benton (1889–1975), Edward Hopper (1882–1967), Andrew Wyeth (1917–2009), (Note: Wyeth's tempera painting Christina's World (1948, MoMA), is one of the most well-known images in 20th-century American art.) Ben Shahn (1898–1969), Grant Wood (1891–1942), George Tooker (1920–2011), John Steuart Curry (1897–1946), Reginald Marsh (1898–1954), Will Barnet (1911–2012), Philip Evergood (1901–1973), Philip Pearlstein (1924–2022), Harry Sternberg (1904–2001), southwestern modernist Georgia O'Keeffe (1887–1986), and "American Renoir" Waldo Pierce (1884–1970). Several works are housed at the Art Institute of Chicago.

Precisionism and "Immaculate" painters such as Demuth removed extravagant detail. Magical realism painters included Paul Cadmus (1904–1999) and Henry Koerner (1915–1991).

In Italy, Giorgio Morandi (1890–1964) was the foremost still-life painter, exploring a wide variety of approaches to depicting everyday bottles and kitchen implements. Nazi Germany sought to combat "degenerate art", promoting heroic realism and painters like Adolf Ziegler (1892–1959). The Soviet Union had Socialist realism.

=== Abstract expressionism ===
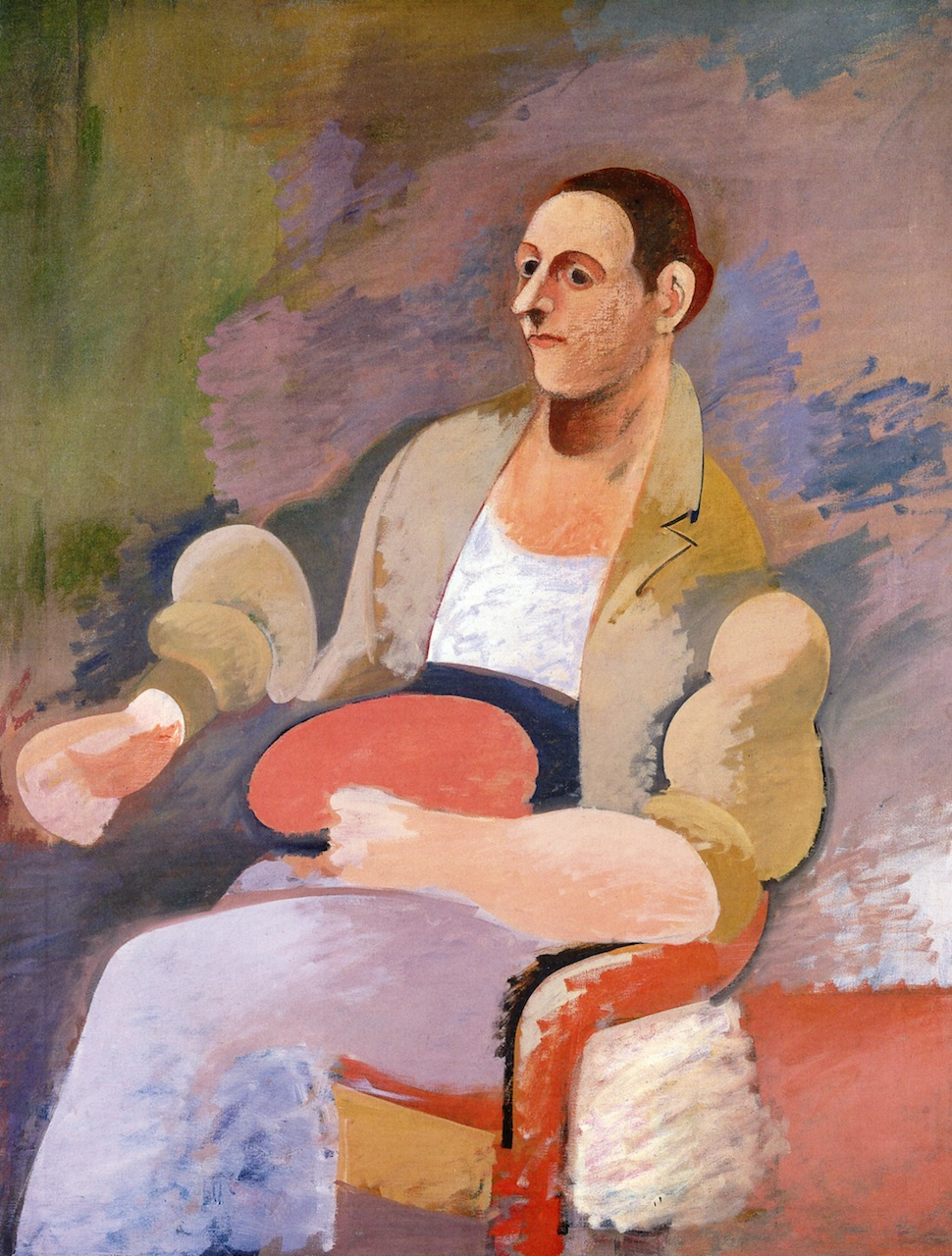
Arshile Gorky, Portrait of Master Bill (1937, National Gallery of Art). Portrait of Willem de Kooning.

After World War II, abstract painting and expressionism evolved into abstract expressionism, coined by art critic Robert Coates (1897–1973) in 1946. Prevalent with a School of New York City painters, Abstract expressionism combined lessons from American modernists Hartley and Stuart Davis, and European-American modernists Hans Hofmann (1880–1966) and John D. Graham (1887–1973); plus benefited from the presence of Mondrian, Léger, Ernst and the Breton group, Matisse's gallery, Sidney Janis's (1896–1989) gallery, and Peggy Guggenheim's (1898–1979) gallery The Art of This Century.

The paintings of Arshile Gorky (1904–1948) and Robert De Niro, Sr. (1922–1993) show the evolution of abstract expressionism from figure painting, cubism and surrealism. Gorky created bio-morphically shaped and abstracted figurative compositions, that by the 1940s evolved into totally abstract paintings.

Willem (1904–1997) and Elaine de Kooning (1918–1989), John Ferren (1905–1970), Franz Kline (1910–1962), Robert Motherwell (1915–1991), Barnett Newman (1905–1970), Ad Reinhardt (1913–1967), Milton Resnick (1917–2004), and Jack Tworkov (1900–1982) were members of "The Club." Other New York School members include Helen Frankenthaler (1928–2011), Grace Hartigan (1922–2008), Conrad Marca-Relli (1913–2000), Knox Martin (1923–2022), Frank O'Hara (1926–1966), Larry Rivers (1923–2002), and Esteban Vicente (1903–2001).

"Abstract expressionism" applies to an eclectic group including grotesque figurative paintings of Willem De Kooning, (Note: Woman III (1953, private collection of Steven A. Cohen) is one of a series of six paintings depicting a grotesque, three-quarter-length female figure, encouraged by art historian Meyer Schapiro (1904–1996).) energetic, drip and "action paintings" of Kline and Jackson Pollock (1912–1956), and simplified Color Field and monochrome paintings of Newman and Mark Rothko (1903–1970). Also included are Post-painterly Abstraction, Geometric abstraction, shaped canvas painting, hard-edge painting, Minimalism and Postminimalism, Lyrical Abstraction, and abstract illusionism. Manfred Schwartz (1909–1970) practiced abstract pointillism.

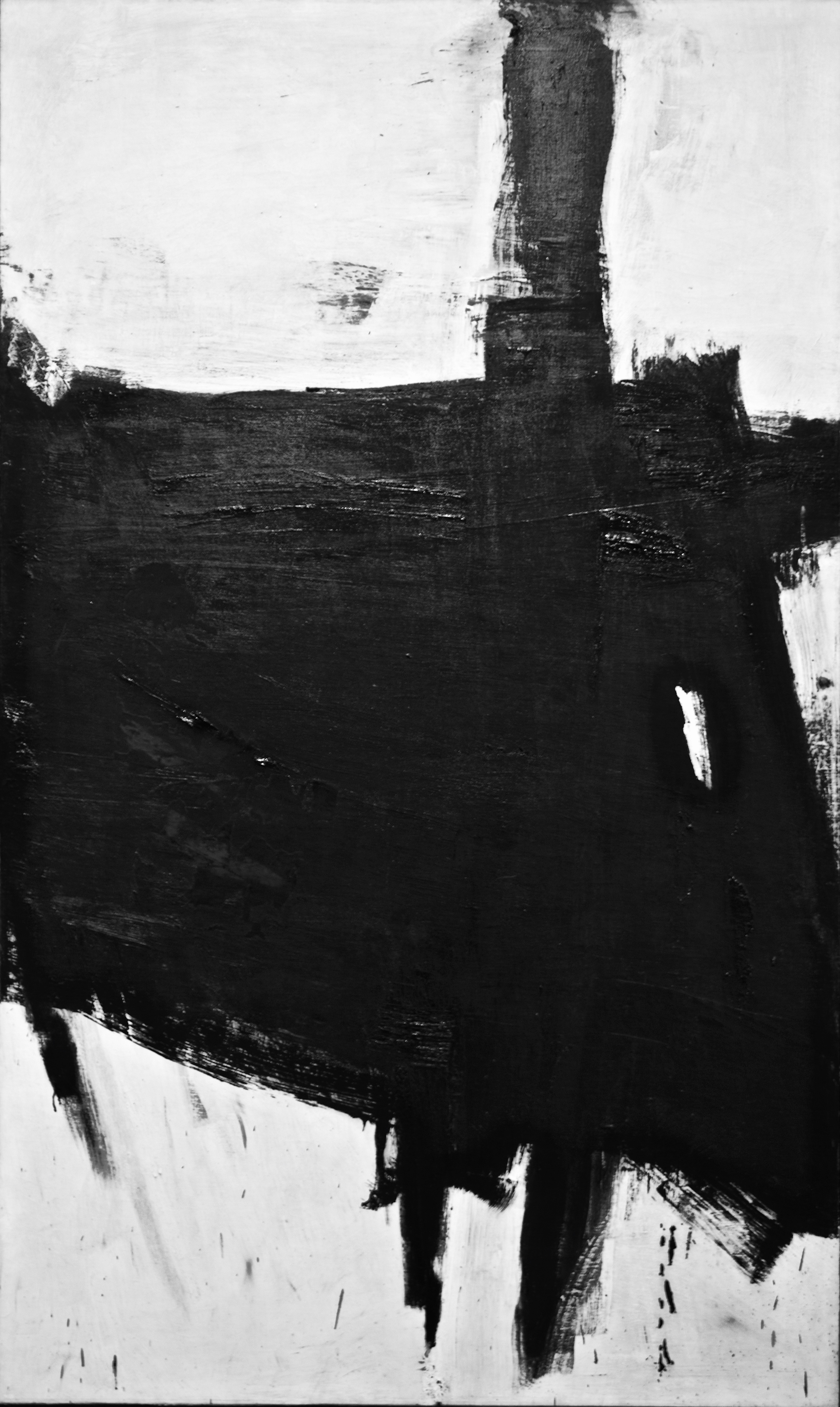
Franz Kline, Sabra (1966, Berardo Collection)

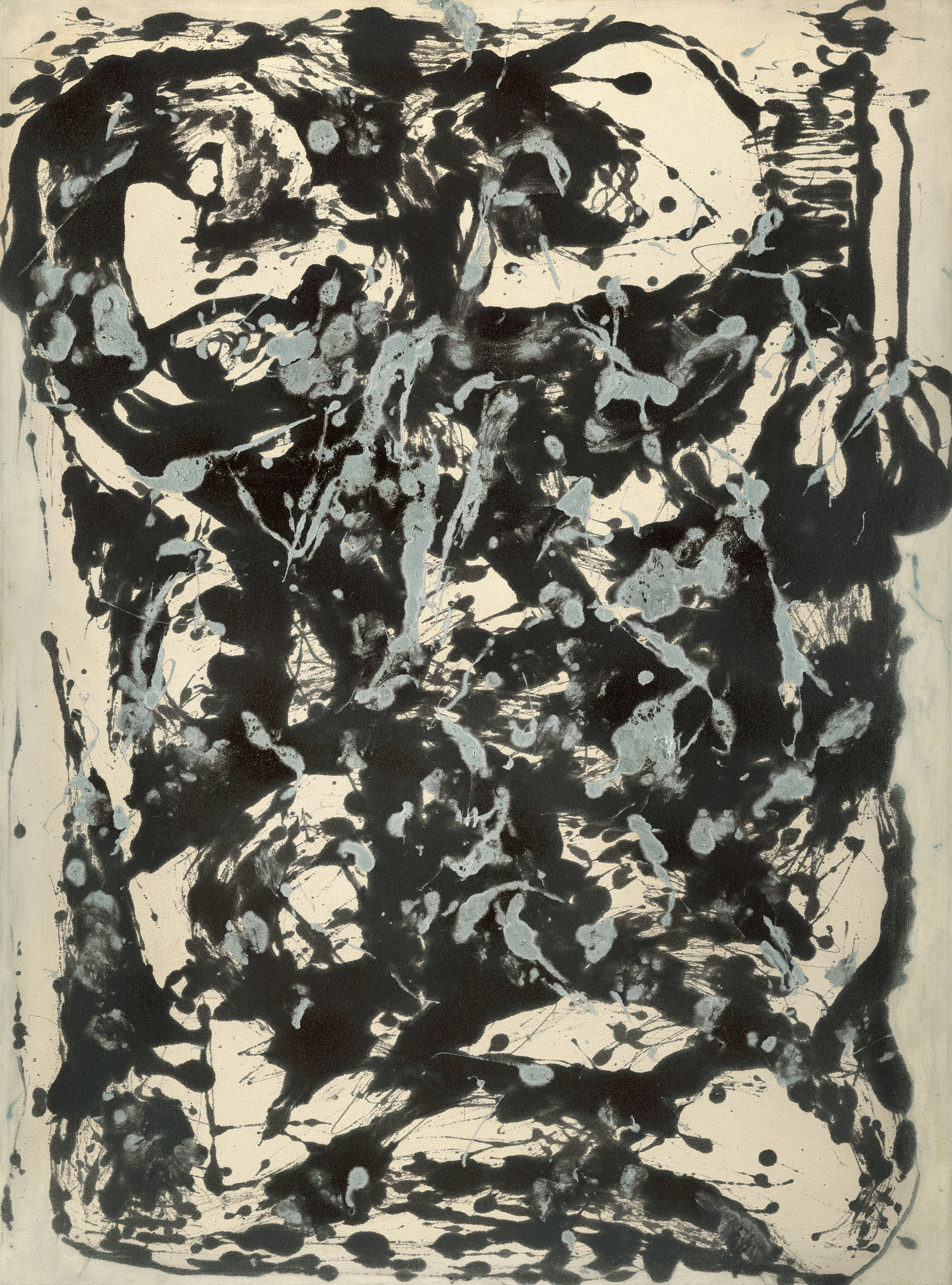
Jackson Pollock, Brown and Silver I (1951, Thyssen-Bornemisza Museum).

Action painting

The Irascibles were 18 abstract expressionist painters who penned an open letter to the president of the Metropolitan Museum of Art, boycotted the museum's exhibition American Painting Today - 1950. They were Hofmann, Willem de Kooning, Motherwell, Newman, Pollock, Reinhardt, Rothko, Jimmy Ernst (1920–1984), Adolph Gottlieb (1903–1974), William Baziotes (1912–1963), Clyfford Still (1904–1980), Richard Pousette-Dart (1916–1992), Theodoros Stamos (1922–1997), Bradley Walker Tomlin (1899–1953), Hedda Sterne (1910–2011), James Brooks (1906–1992), Weldon Kees (1914–1955), and Fritz Bultman (1919–1985).

A group of 75 artists issued a statement defending the museum, including Grosz, realists Barnet, Evergood, Marsh, Pierce, Sternberg, and Koerner; and abstract expressionists Schwartz, Xavier Gonzalez (1898–1993), and Milton Avery (1885–1965).

Abstract expressionism's European equivalent developed from the School of Paris's Tachisme and related Cobra movement, including Jean Dubuffet (1901–1985), Pierre Soulages (1919–2022), Nicolas de Staël (1914–1955), Hans Hartung (1904–1989), Serge Poliakoff (1900–1969), and Georges Mathieu (1921–2012). The similar School of London included Frank Auerbach (1931–2024), Francis Bacon (1909–1992), and Lucian Freud (1922–2011).

==== Action painting ====
Kline is best known for bold, black-and-white compositions, focusing mostly just on dramatic gestures and brush strokes with wide swaths of paint across the canvas. Pollock's drip technique, with canvas laid on the floor, derived from Masson. Pollock's wife was Lee Krasner (1908–1984).

Northwest School mystic painters included Guy Anderson (1906–1998), Kenneth Callahan (1905–1986), Morris Graves (1910–2001), and Mark Tobey (1890–1976), who anticipated Pollock's style.

==== Color Field ====
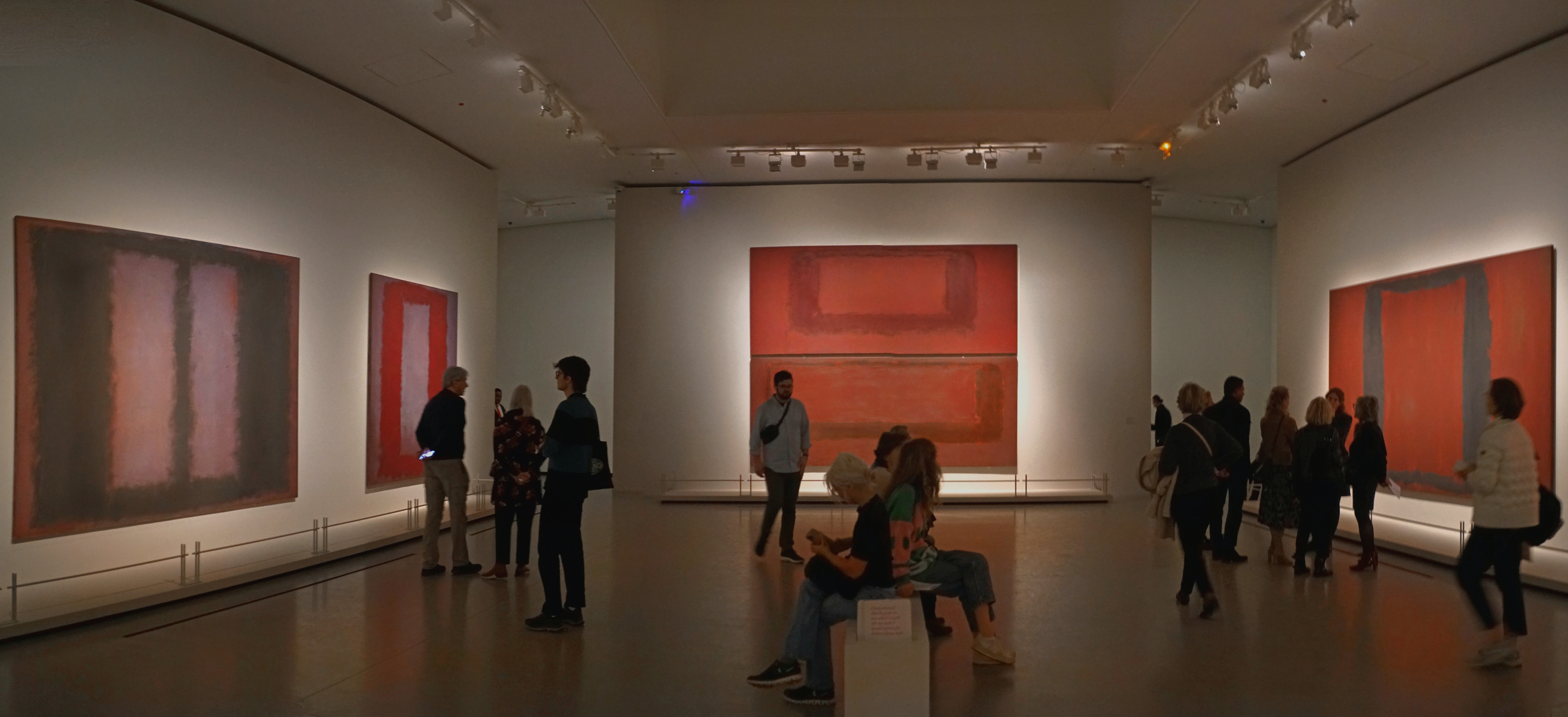
Mark Rothko's seagram murals, displayed at the Fondation Louis Vuitton.

Gottlieb, Newman, Rothko, and Still were classified by art critic Clement Greenberg (1909–1994) as Color field painting. Hofmann and Motherwell are described as both action painters and Color field painters. Additional Color field painters include Friedel Dzubas (1915–1994), John Hoyland (1934–2011), Jules Olitski (1922–2007), Larry Poons (born 1937), and Larry Zox (1937–2006).

Much of de Staël's late work, like his abstract landscapes, prefigures Color field painting. Matisse and Avery's color in seascapes and landscapes influenced Color field painters such as Gottlieb and Rothko.

Color field involves abstract paintings with large, flat expanses of color on large surfaces, expressing sensual and visual feelings, attempting to channel an almost religious experience, awestruck in the face of sensuality, color and surface. The Washington Color School included Gene Davis (1920–1985), Morris Louis (1912–1962), and Kenneth Noland (1924–2010); and its associates include Paul Reed (1919–2015), Thomas Downing (1928–1985), Sam Gilliam (1933–2002), Howard Mehring (1931–1978), and Alma Thomas (1891–1978).

===== Post-painterly abstraction =====
Greenberg noted a new movement in painting derived from abstract expressionism but that "favored openness or clarity", as opposed to the dense, painterly surface, stressing contrasts of pure hues, and diluted paint. Post-painterly abstraction included Color field painters influenced by Newman, and the soak-stain technique of Frankenthaler, such as Walter Darby Bannard (1934–2016), Dzubas, Louis, and Noland.

==== Geometric abstraction ====
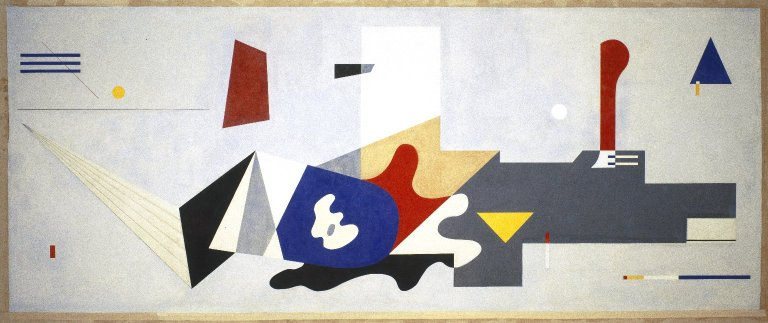
Ilya Bolotowsky Untitled (c. 1936, Brooklyn Museum), from Williamsburg Housing Project murals.

Influenced by Europeans Mondrian and Albers, American Geometric abstraction painters include Mino Argento (born 1927), Ilya Bolotowsky (1907–1981), Gene Davis, Agnes Denes (born 1931), Burgoyne Diller (1906–1965), Downing, Al Held (1928–2005), Kelly, Robert Mangold (born 1937), McLaughlin, Noland, Frank Stella (1936–2024), and Zox. In Europe, Bauhaus artists pursued geometric abstraction.

==== Shaped canvas ====
Another movement associated with geometric abstraction was the use of the shaped canvas by such artists as Ronald Davis (1937–2025), Charles Hinman (1932–2026), Ellsworth Kelly (1923–2015), Al Loving (1935–2005), Mangold, Paul Mogensen (born 1941), Jeremy Moon (1934–1973), Newman, Noland, David Novros (born 1941), Robert Ryman (1930–2019), Stella, Richard Tuttle (born 1941), and Neil Williams (1934–1988).

==== Hard-edge ====
Another tendency noted by Greenberg was hard-edge painting. Influenced by Albers and Mondrian, hard-edge painting uses abrupt changes between color to define the shape of the painting. The term was coined in 1959 by art historian Jules Langsner (1911—1967) to characterize the nonfigurative work of four California artists: Karl Benjamin (1925–2012), Lorser Feitelson (1898–1978), Frederick Hammersley (1919–2009), and John McLaughlin (1898–1976).

Artists such as Ronald Davis, Al Held (1928–2005), Kelly, Alexander Liberman (1912–1999), Noland, Reinhardt, Stella, and Jack Youngerman (1926–2020) also explored hard-edge formats.

==== Minimalism ====
Brice Marden, The Dylan Painting (Monochrome, 1966, revised in 1986, San Francisco Museum of Modern Art).

The Minimalists thought art should not refer to anything other than itself, reacting against action painting, and taking inspiration from conceptual art, suprematists, Color Field painters like Louis, Newman, and Reinhardt, and hard-edge painters; as well as Europeans like Bauhaus, De Stijl, and Romanian sculptor Constantin Brâncuși (1876–1957).

Reinhardt, whose reductive, all-black paintings prefigured minimalism, stated: "The more stuff in it, the busier the work of art, the worse it is. More is less. Less is more. The eye is a menace to clear sight. The laying bare of oneself is obscene. Art begins with the getting rid of nature."

Minimalist painters include Jo Baer (1929–2025), Sol LeWitt (1928–2007), Mangold, Brice Marden (1938–2023), Agnes Martin (1912–2004), McLaughlin, Mogensen, Novros, Ryman, Stella, Tuttle, Cy Twombly (1928–2011), and Williams. LeWitt and Martin influenced Pat Steir (1938–2026).

Stella's early "stripe" paintings were highlighted in the show "16 Americans" (1959), organized by Dorothy Canning Miller (1904–2003) at New York's Museum of Modern Art (MoMA). (Note: The widths of the stripes were not entirely subjective, but determined by the dimensions of the lumber used to construct the supportive chassis upon which the canvas was stretched.) In the show catalog, Carl Andre (1935–2024) noted, "Art excludes the unnecessary. Frank Stella has found it necessary to paint stripes. There is nothing else in his painting."

Influenced by Mangold, minimalism concerned itself with sculpture. Donald Judd (1928–1994) started as a painter, but ended as a creator of objects, influencing Minimalist aesthetics with his essay endorsing "Specific Objects" (1964), which were not comfortably classified as either painting or sculpture.

Judd rejected the inherited, European artistic values in American art, endorsing an array of New York artists, including Jasper Johns (born 1930), installation artist Dan Flavin (1933–1996), and Lee Bontecou (1931–2022). Of "preliminary" importance for Judd was George Earl Ortman (1926–2015), who distilled forms into blunt, tough, philosophically charged geometries.

==== Post-minimalism ====
Minimalism was heavily criticized by high modernist, formalist art critics and historians, who felt it abandoned painting as understood by Greenberg. The most notable critic was Michael Fried (born 1939), who objected on the basis of its "theatricality". In "Art and Objecthood" (1967) he argued that work like Robert Morris's (1931–2018) transformed the act of viewing into a type of spectacle.

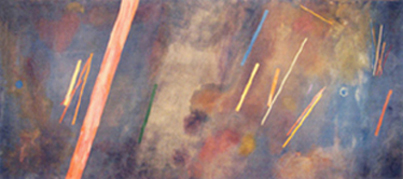
Ronnie Landfield, For William Blake (Lyrical abstraction, 1968, private collection)

Post-minimalism includes painters like Sean Scully (born 1945) and Eva Hesse (1936–1970), better known for her sculpture. Joan Snyder (born 1940) described her own paintings as "maximalism".

==== Lyrical Abstraction ====
De Staël's late work also prefigured Lyrical Abstraction, emphasizing gesture, rhythm, emotional brushwork, and a poetic sensibility; characterized by the paintings of Dan Christensen (1942–2007), Susan Crile (born 1942), Dzubas, Sam Francis (1923–1994), Hoyland, Ronnie Landfield (born 1947), Joan Mitchell (1925–1992), Peter Young (born 1940), and Tachists Wols (1913–1951) and Jean-Paul Riopelle (1923–2002).

==== Abstract illusionism ====
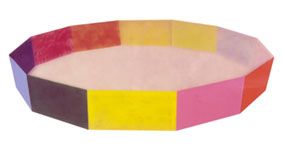
Ronald Davis, Ring (Abstract Illusionism, 1968, MoMA)

Abstract illusionism was a derivative of expressionism and hard-edge, coined by Barbara Rose (1936–2020) in 1967, insisting on flatness of the picture plane, but with the added elements of perspective, artificial light sources, and simulated cast shadows. Abstract illusionism includes painters Ronald Davis, James Havard (1937–2020), Jack Lembeck (born 1942), Joe Doyle (1941–2020), Tony King (born 1944), Jack Reilly (born 1950), George D. Green (1943–2020), and Michael B. Gallagher (born 1945). Ronald Davis's polyester resin and fiberglass works pay homage to Duchamp.

=== Art brut and outsider art ===
Art brut, coined by Dubuffet shortly after World War II, reacted against abstract art, preferring untrained artists with no contact to the larger artworld. The English equivalent is "Outsider art", coined in 1972 by art critic Roger Cardinal (1940–2019).

=== Bay Area Figurative Movement ===
Hand-colored etchings of Wayne Thiebaud at the Courtauld Gallery.

Fairfield Porter (1907–1975) was a largely self-taught realist during Abstract Expressionism, painting primarily landscapes, domestic interiors, and portraits.

During the early 1950s, de Staël abandoned abstraction, returning to representationalism, which, along with art brut, set a precedent for the American Bay Area Figurative Movement, associated with the California School of Fine Arts, including painters Elmer Bischoff (1916–1991), Joan Brown (1938–1990), Richard Diebenkorn (1922–1993), David Park (1911–1960), Wayne Thiebaud (1920–2021), and associate Nathan Oliveira (1928 –2010)

=== Neo-dada ===
Neo-Dada combined manufactured items with artist materials, creating new conventions of art-making; they made acceptable in serious, contemporary art circles the inclusion of unlikely materials.

Johns, Robert Rauschenberg (1925–2008), and Larry Rivers (1923–2002), departed from abstract expressionism, especially by using banal and literal imagery from advertisements and popular culture, and including mundane materials. (Note: Rauschenberg's "combines" and constructions also included objects and pictures taken from hardware stores, junkyards, city streets, and taxidermy.) Rauschenberg influenced Elizabeth Murray (1940–2007). Neo-Dada also includes John Chamberlain (1927–2011), Claes Oldenburg (1929–2002), George Segal (1924–2000), Jim Dine (born 1935), and Edward Kienholz (1927–1994).

==== Fluxus ====
Emerging at about the same time as minimalism, with similar motivations, was the Dada-influenced Fluxus movement. Fluxus painters include Geoffrey Hendricks (1931–2018) and Ben Vautier (1935–2024).

=== Pop art ===
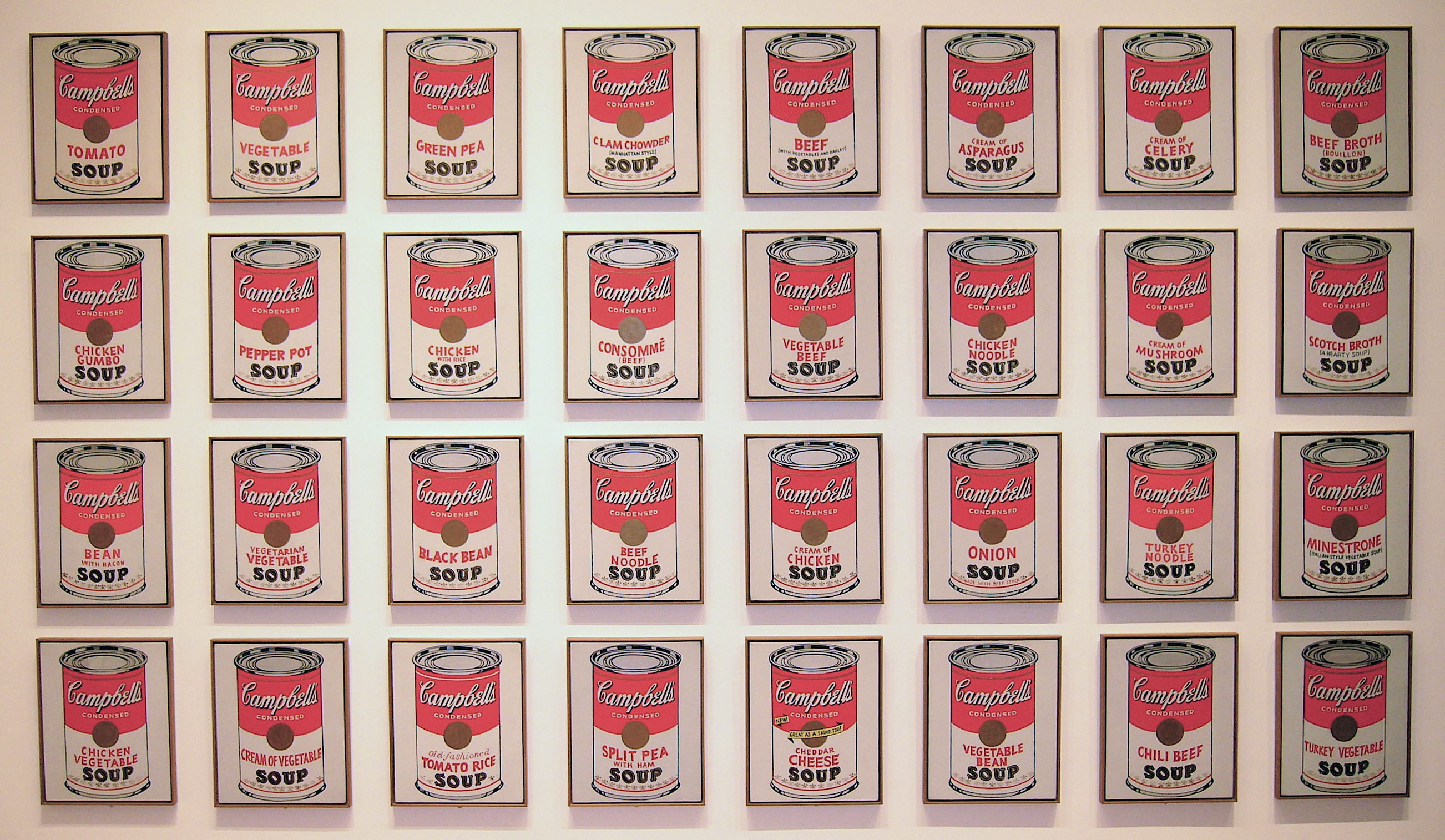
Andy Warhol, Campbell's Soup Cans (1962, MoMA). First displayed in 1962 in the Ferus Gallery. The MoMA held a "Symposium on Pop Art" in late 1962.

The term Pop Art, first used in 1956 by Lawrence Alloway (1929–1990), included painters such as David Hockney (1937–2026), Richard Hamilton (1922–2011), Peter Blake (born 1932), and Eduardo Paolozzi (1924–2005) who rejected psychological, Abstract expressionism and celebrated post-war consumerism, popular culture, advertising, and iconography of mass production.

American pop art began in Manhattan's East Village 10th Street galleries. Claes Oldenburg (1929–2022) had a storefront, and the 57th Street Green Gallery began to show Tom Wesselmann (1931–2004) and James Rosenquist (1933–2017). The style was foreshadowed by American modernists Murphy and Stuart Davis, Demuth and primitivism, and the sense of humor from Dadaists like Duchamp and Ray,; and directly inspired by Neo-Dadaists Johns, Rivers, and Rauschenberg.

Pop art also includes painters Dine, Andy Warhol (1928–1987), Wayne Thiebaud (1920–2021), and Roy Lichtenstein (1923–1997). (Note: Lichtenstein painted Drowning Girl (1963, MoMA), appropriated from the lead story in DC Comics' Secret Hearts #83.) Warhol was the "innovator of pop art", merging popular culture with fine art, while incorporating humor and irony. Photorealism also developed from Pop Art.

Lichtenstein used oil and Magna paint in thick outlines, bold colors and Ben-Day dots to reproduce the appearance of commercial printing. Lichtenstein would say of his own work: Abstract Expressionists "put things down on the canvas and responded to what they had done, to the color positions and sizes. My style looks completely different, but the nature of putting down lines pretty much is the same; mine just don't come out looking calligraphic, like Pollock's or Kline's."

=== Nouveau réalisme ===
Contemporary with American pop art, Nouveau réalisme (French for "new realism"), founded in 1960 by the art critic Pierre Restany (1930–2003), and Yves Klein (1928–1962) during the first collective exposition in the Apollinaire gallery in Milan, included French painters using imagery in new and radical ways, like Arman (1928–2005), Martial Raysse (born 1936), Christo (1935–2020), Niki de Saint Phalle (1930–2002), David Hockney (1937–2026), Alex Katz (born 1927), Malcolm Morley (1931–2018), Ralph Goings (1928–2016), Audrey Flack (1931–2024), Richard Estes (born 1932), Chuck Close (1940–2021), Susan Rothenberg (1945–2020), Eric Fischl (born 1948), and Vija Celmins (born 1938).

=== Op art ===
Bridget Riley, Shadowplay (1990, Fitzwilliam Museum).

"Op art" (optical art) was coined by Time magazine in 1964, for abstract art with optical illusions, in response to Julian Stanczak's (1928–2017) show Optical Paintings at the Martha Jackson Gallery. Albers influenced Op art painters, who include Victor Vasarely (1906–1977), Bridget Riley (born 1931), and Richard Anuszkiewicz (1930–2020). Poons prefigured Op Art by emphasizing dots, ovals, and after-images bouncing across color fields.

=== Neo-expressionism ===
In the late 1960s, abstract expressionist Philip Guston (1913–1980) helped lead a transition from abstract expressionism to Neo-expressionism, abandoning the so-called "pure abstraction" of abstract expressionism in favor of more cartoonish renderings, inspiring a new generation of painters interested in a revival of intensely expressive imagery; seen in Italian Transavantguardia, German Neue Wilde, French Figuration Libre, and the British school of London, plus the Stuckists.

Related to earlier developments in Postminimal painting, neo-expressionists reacted against conceptual and minimalistic art, returning to portraying recognizable objects, though in a rough and violently emotional way, using vivid colors in large formats. Critics were divided, as some believed neo-expressionism was driven by profit motivations of large commercial galleries.

The Europeans neo-expressionists include Guston, Auerbach, Leon Kossoff (1926–2019), Gerhard Richter (born 1932), A. R. Penck (1939–2017), Georg Baselitz (1938–2026), and Anselm Kiefer (born 1945). Americans include Eric Fischl (born 1948), Archie Rand (born 1949), Susan Rothenberg (1945–2020), David Salle (born 1952), Jean-Michel Basquiat (1960–1988), Julian Schnabel (born 1951), and Keith Haring (1958–1990), Italians Francesco Clemente (born 1952), Mimmo Paladino (born 1948), Sandro Chia (born 1946), and Enzo Cucchi (born 1949).

=== "Death of painting" ===
The 1960s and 1970s saw a reaction against painting. Douglas Crimp (born 1956) viewed the work of artists like Reinhardt, and declared the "death of painting". New movements gained prominence, including Mail art and body art.

== Contemporary painting ==
However, painting still holds a respected position in contemporary art, both late modern and postmodern. Throughout the 20th century, and into the 21st, distinctions have faded between what is generally regarded as the fine arts and low arts, as high art continues to mix with popular culture. Artists can achieve critical success whether their images are representational or abstract. Instead what matters is content, exploring boundaries of the medium, and refusing to recapitulate paintings of the past.

Damien Hirst Beautiful revolving sphincter, oops brown painting (2003, private collection)

The rise of television saw painters instructed by PBS wet-on-wet The Magic of Oil Painting host Bill Alexander (1915–1997), The Joy of Painting host Bob Ross (1942–1995), and BBC art historian Sister Wendy (1930–2018).

Mainstream painting is rejected by postmodern artists in favor of artistic pluralism. According to art critic and analytic, aesthetic philosopher Arthur Danto (1924–2013), there is a prevailing "anything goes" attitude; an "everything going on", creating an aesthetic traffic jam and consequently "nothing going on".

=== Neoconceptualism and Neo-pop ===
The representatives of postmodernism in painting were the neo-conceptualists, such as the Moscow Conceptualists, the Young British Artists, such as Neo-pop and spin artist Damien Hirst (born 1965), and Americans Ross Bleckner (born 1949), Peter Halley (born 1953), Jenny Holzer (born 1950), Jeff Koons (born 1955), Barbara Kruger, (born 1945), Louise Lawler (born 1947), Sherrie Levine (born 1947), Richard Prince (born 1949), Cindy Sherman (born 1954), Haim Steinbach (born 1944), and Philip Taaffe (born 1955).

== See also ==
- List of painters

== Sources ==
- Clement Greenberg, Art and Culture, Beacon Press, 1961
- Hendrickson, Janis (1988). Roy Lichtenstein. Cologne, Germany: Benedikt Taschen. ISBN 3-8228-0281-6.
- The Triumph of Modernism: The Art World, 1985–2005, Hilton Kramer, 2006, ISBN 0-15-666370-8
- Pictures of Nothing: Abstract Art since Pollock (A.W. Mellon Lectures in the Fine Arts), Kirk Varnedoe, 2003
- O'Connor, Francis V. Jackson Pollock Exhibition Catalogue, (New York, Museum of Modern Art, [1967]) OCLC 165852
- Lyrical Abstraction, Exhibition Catalogue, Whitney Museum of American Art, NYC, 1971.
- David Piper, The Illustrated Library of Art, Portland House, New York, 1986, ISBN 0-517-62336-6
- Agee, William C.; Rose, Barbara, 1979, Patrick Henry Bruce: American Modernist (exhibition catalogue), Houston: Museum of Fine Arts

=== On the effects of Gutenberg's printing ===
- Elizabeth L. Eisenstein, The Printing Press as an Agent of Change, Cambridge University Press, September 1980, Paperback, 832 pages, ISBN 0-521-29955-1
- More recent, abridged version: Elizabeth L. Eisenstein, The Printing Revolution in Early Modern Europe, Cambridge University Press, 2Rev ed, 12 September 2005, Paperback, ISBN 0-521-60774-4
- Marshall McLuhan, The Gutenberg Galaxy: The Making of Typographic Man (1962) University of Toronto Press (1st ed.); reissued by Routledge & Kegan Paul ISBN 0-7100-1818-5.
- Briggs & Burke, A Social History of the Media: The Print Revolution in Context (2002)
