= Minnie Tate =

Member of the Fisk Jubilee Singers

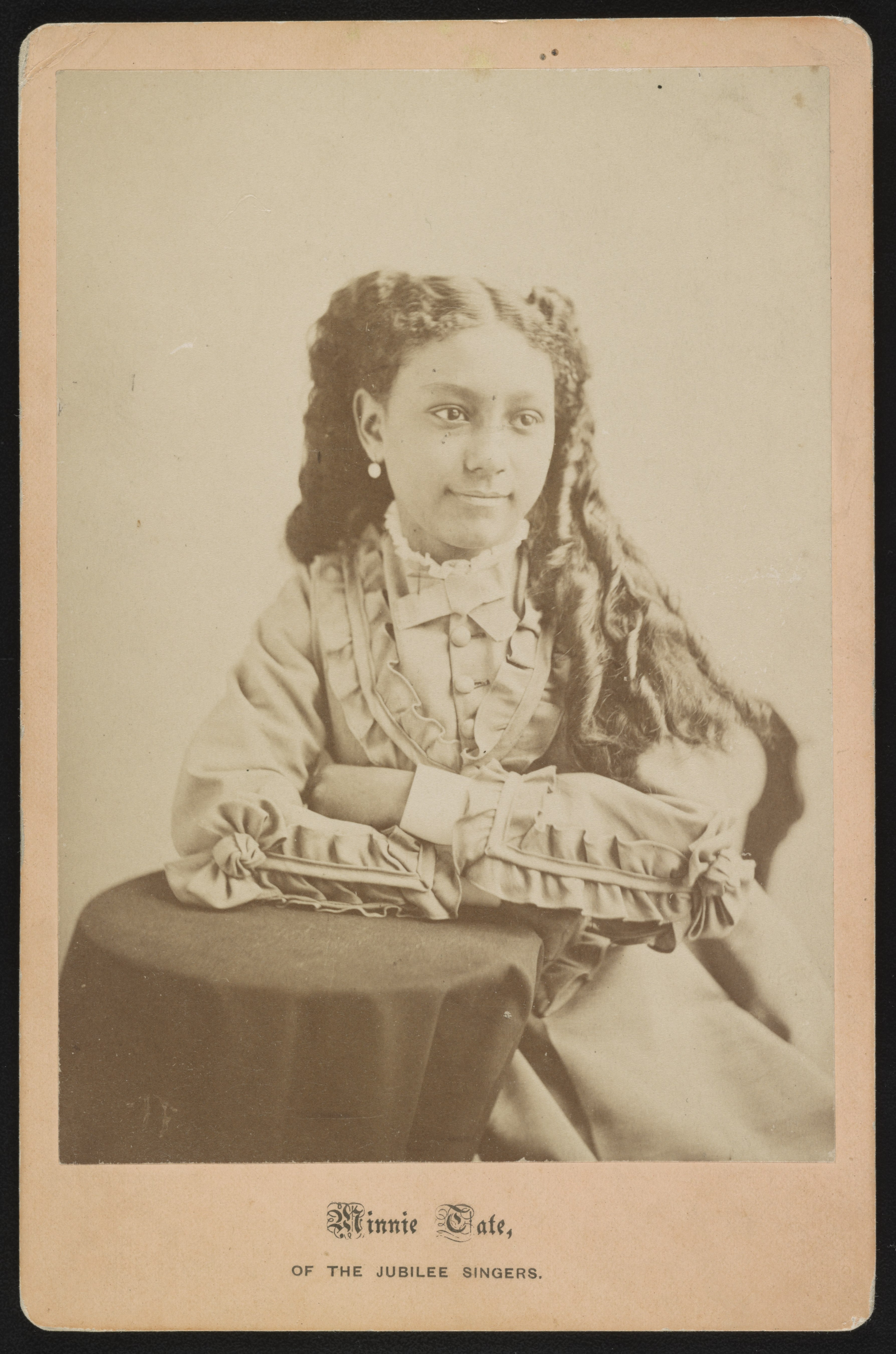
- Minnie Tate, from the Library of Congress.
- Born: 1857; Nashville, Tennessee
- Died: April 29, 1899 (aged 41–42); Nashville, Tennessee
- Other names: Minnie Tate Hall (married name)
- Occupation: singer
- Known for: Original member of the Fisk Jubilee Singers

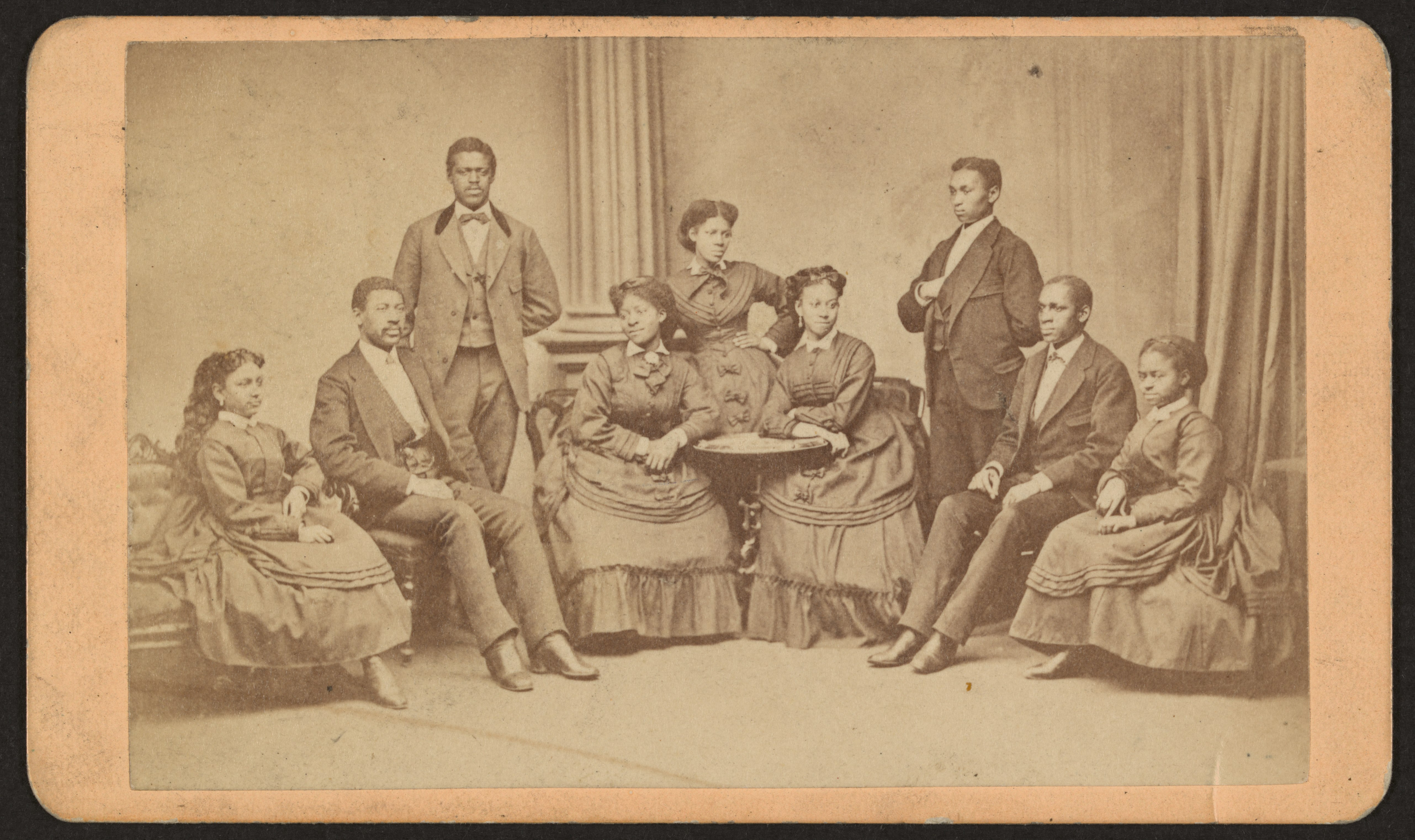
Jubilee Singers, Fisk University, Nashville, Tenn. LCCN2010647805; Tate is at the far left in this grouping

Minnie Tate (1857 – April 29, 1899) was the youngest original member of the Fisk Jubilee Singers, based in Nashville, Tennessee.

== Early life ==
Tate was born in Nashville, Tennessee, the daughter of Andrew L. Tate and Adelle A. Livingston Tate. Her grandmother, Dicey Tanner, and mother, Adelle, were freed from enslavement in Mississippi, and migrated north. Tate's mother was a teacher. Tate enrolled at Fisk University.

== Career ==
Tate and Eliza Walker were the youngest members of the Fisk Jubilee Singers when it first formed in 1871; both were fourteen years old that year. Tate's "sweet, clear voice" was showcased in the song "Flee as a Bird" in their performances. The Fisk Jubilee Singers performed African-American spirituals. They also sang songs by white composer Stephen Foster. Their performances raised money for Fisk, and eventually paid for Jubilee Hall on the Nashville campus. She was the youngest of the group when they toured Great Britain, Holland, and Germany, singing for Queen Victoria, William Ewart Gladstone, Dwight L. Moody, Mark Twain, Henry Ward Beecher, Ulysses S. Grant, and others.

The physical strain of that tour made Minnie Tate give up professional singing upon her return to the United States. In 1880, she and fellow Jubilee Singer Georgia Gordon sang a duet at an event marking the ninth anniversary of the group's formation.

== Personal life ==
Tate married a fellow singer, R. A. Hall; they had a son, Roger. She was widowed in 1886. She died in 1899, in her early forties, in Nashville. In 1978, Tate and the other original members of the Fisk Jubilee Singers were granted posthumous honorary Doctor of Music degrees from Fisk University. It is traditional for current Fisk Jubilee Singers to sing and place a wreath of magnolia leaves at the Nashville grave of Minnie Tate every year.
