= Harriet C. Johnson =

African-American suffragist and educator

- Born: 1845; Philadelphia, Pennsylvania, US
- Died: November 11, 1907 (aged 61–62)
- Other names: Harriet Cassell Loudin
- Occupations: Educator, Suffragist
- Spouse: Frederick J. Loudin (m. 1870; died in 1904)

Harriet C. Johnson (1845–1907) was an African-American suffragist and educator.

== Life ==
Johnson was born in December 1845 in Philadelphia, Pennsylvania. She attended the Institute for Colored Youth in Philadelphia, graduating in 1864.

Johnson began her career as an educator working as the principal at the Philadelphia Association of Friends for the Instruction of Poor Children's infant department. In 1868 she went on to become the principal of the preparatory and ladies' departments of Avery College in Pittsburgh. At that time Henry Highland Garnet served as president of the university. Garnet was a black nationalist and it is possible that his philosophies influenced Johnson's activism in women suffrage.

Around 1870 Johnson attended the National Convention of the Colored Men of America (NCCMA) in Washington, D.C. where she was the only female delegate. Her presence there caused a debate, with some members arguing that the organization was for men only and others arguing that excluding Johnson because she was a woman was similar to African American men being excluded from government solely on the basis of race. The side advocating her inclusion prevailed and Johnson maintained her seat as the delegate from Allegheny City.

In 1870 Johnson married Frederick J. Loudin, a member of the Fisk Jubilee Singers and leader of the Loudin Jubilee Singers.

Johnson died on November 18, 1907, in Portage County, Ohio.

== See also ==
- List of suffragists and suffragettes
