= Mary Eliza Walker Crump =

American singer (1857–1928)

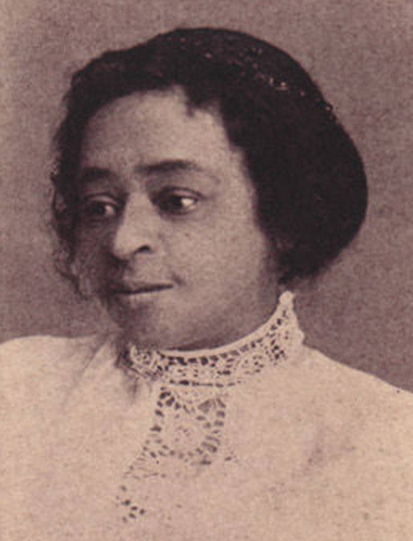
- Mary Eliza Walker Crump, from a 1920 publication.
- Born: Mary Eliza Walker; 1857; Tennessee
- Died: August 6, 1928 (aged 70–71); Chicago, Illinois
- Occupations: singer and manager
- Years active: 1871–1920s
- Known for: original member of the Fisk Jubilee Singers
- Notable work: leader of the Walker Jubilee Singers

Mary Eliza Walker Crump (1857 – August 6, 1928) was an African American contralto singer and manager, and one of the original Fisk Jubilee Singers.

== Early life ==
Mary Eliza Walker was born into slavery near Nashville, Tennessee. "My mother belonged to Wesley Greenfield and my father to John W. Walker of Nashville," she wrote in an 1873 publication. Her father owned an icehouse after the American Civil War.

== Career ==
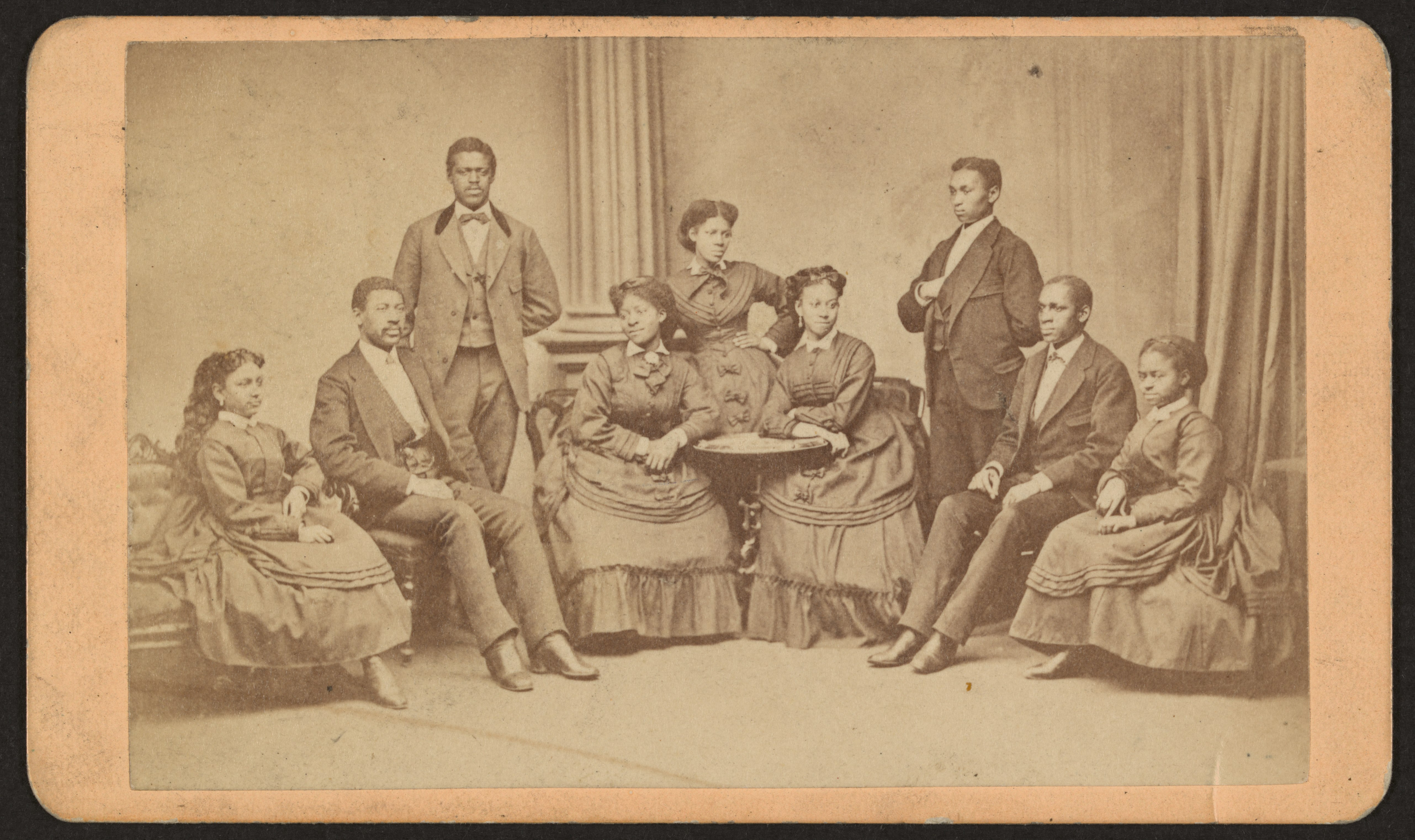
Jubilee Singers, Fisk University, Nashville, Tenn. LCCN2010647805; Mary Eliza Walker Crump is on the far right of this grouping

Mary Elizabeth Walker was just thirteen years old when she became one of the original eleven Fisk Jubilee Singers. White missionary and music professor George L. White organized the group at the Fisk School in Nashville, Tennessee in 1871. Other original members of the group were Maggie Porter and Ella Sheppard. They toured together, in various permutations, from 1871 to 1878, including concerts in England and Germany, singing African-American spirituals. They also sang songs by white composer Stephen Foster. Their performances raised over $150,000 for their school and eventually built Jubilee Hall on the Nashville campus. Their audiences included Queen Victoria, Ulysses S. Grant, Henry Ward Beecher, Mark Twain and Dwight L. Moody.

After the original group disbanded in 1878, Eliza Walker Crump lived in Chicago, and managed the Walker Jubilee Singers, also billed as Walker's Famous Jubilee Singers, touring and performing in a similar vein. They were also a popular act on the chautauqua circuit. In 1882, Eliza Walker Crump and Thomas H. Crump organized the "Nashville Ideal Jubilee Singers" to perform at the Tennessee State Capitol. In 1921, Crump attended the Fisk Jubilee Singers' fiftieth anniversary observance, as one of the four original members still living.

== Personal life ==
Walker married fellow singer Thomas H. Crump; he died in 1922. Mary Eliza Walker Crump died in 1928, in Chicago, aged 70–71 years. Ambrose Caliver, a Dean at Fisk University, sent a letter to be read at her funeral, saying "Fisk University rejoices in the complete fruition of a life so full of beauty and service. The gradual closing of the ranks of the first Jubilee Singers grieves us beyond measure, but we shall always cherish the memory of those who helped to make Fisk possible."

In 1978, fifty years after she died, Eliza Walker and the other original members of the Fisk Jubilee Singers were granted posthumous honorary Doctor of Music degrees from Fisk University.
