= Jubilee quartet =

African-American religious musical groups

Jubilee quartets were popular African-American religious musical groups in the first half of the 20th century. The name derives from the Fisk Jubilee Singers, a group of singers organized by George L. White at Fisk University in 1871 to sing Negro spirituals. The members of the original Fisk Jubilee Quartet (1909–1916) were Alfred G. King (first bass), James A. Myers (second tenor), Noah W. Ryder (second bass), and John W. Work II (first tenor). Students at other historically black schools, such as Hampton Institute, Tuskegee Institute and Wilberforce University, followed suit. Many independent jubilee troupes also found inspiration in the Fisk Jubilee Singers, such as the Original Nashville Students.

The early jubilee quartets featured close harmonies, formal arrangements and a "flatfooted" style of singing that emphasized restrained musical expression and technique derived from Western musical traditions. Early quartets reinforced their respectable image by adopting uniforms that a university glee club might wear and discouraging improvisation.

In time, however, the popularity of the jubilee style spread from the universities to black churches, where quartets, singing before audiences with a tradition of enthusiastic response, began to absorb much of the energy and freedom of Gospel music coming out of Holiness churches. Groups such as the Golden Gate Quartet—originally named the Golden Gate Jubilee Quartet—infused their performances of spirituals with the rhythmic beat of blues and jazz and gradually began including gospel standards written by Thomas A. Dorsey and others in their repertoire. The Gates and other jubilee quartets gained nationwide popularity through radio broadcasts, records and touring in the 1930s and 1940s.

Other groups, such as the Dixie Hummingbirds and the Original Five Blind Boys of Alabama (formally known as the Happyland Jubilee Singers) that had begun singing in the conventional jubilee style went further, creating the more improvisational and fervent style of quartet singing known as "hard Gospel". That new style largely eclipsed jubilee singing by the 1950s.
