= Orpheus McAdoo =

American singer and minstrel show impresario (1858–1900)

Orpheus Myron McAdoo
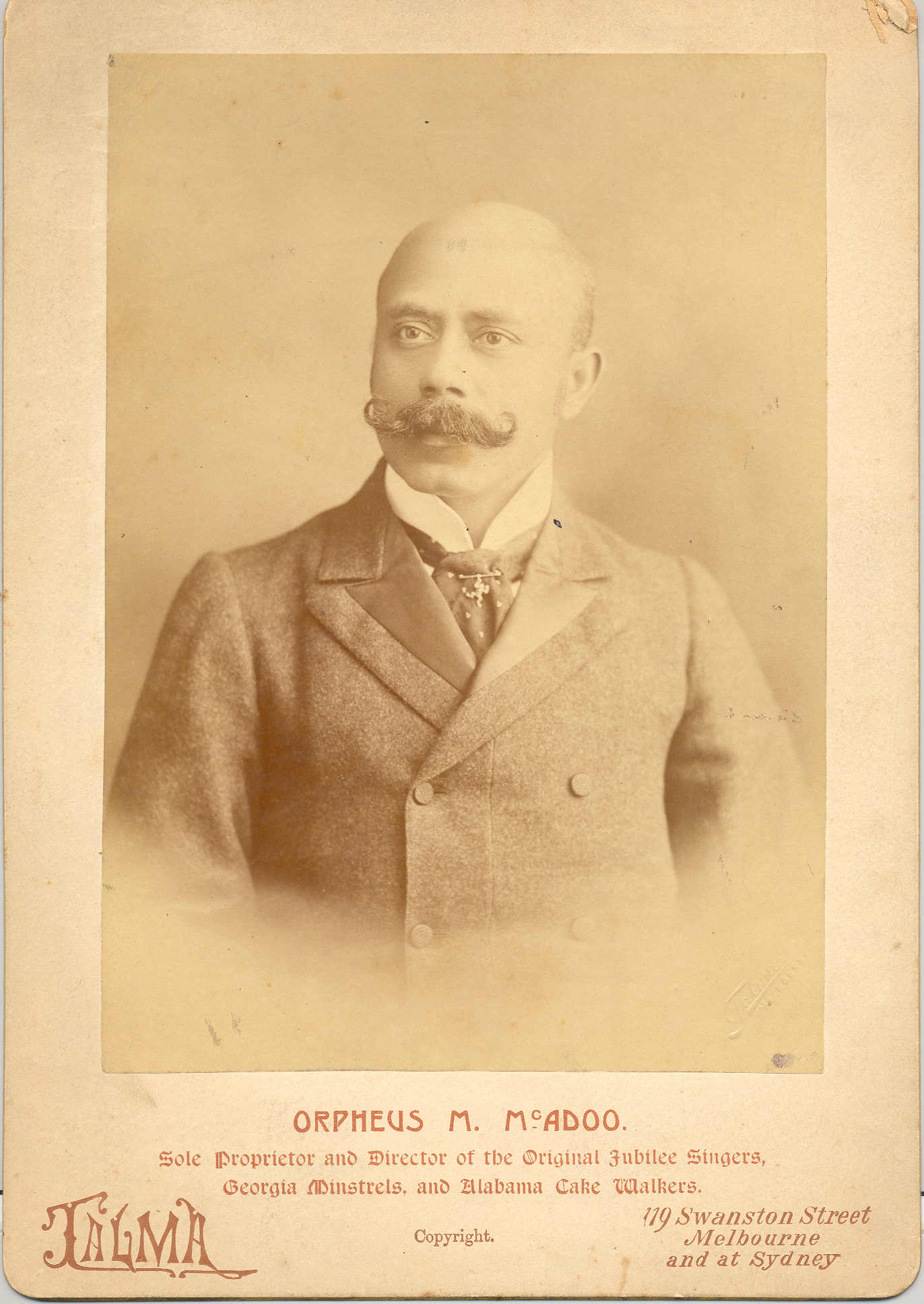
- McAdoo circa 1900
- Born: January 4, 1858; Greensboro, North Carolina, U.S.
- Died: July 17, 1900 (aged 42); Sydney, Australia
- Occupations: Singer and minstrel show impresario
- Known for: Georgia Minstrels and Alabama Cakewalkers

Orpheus Myron McAdoo (January 4, 1858 – July 17, 1900) was an American singer and minstrel show impresario. He toured extensively in Britain, the Cape Colony, and Australia, first with Frederick Loudin's Jubilee Singers and then with his own minstrel companies.

== Early years ==
Orpheus McAdoo was born in Greensboro, North Carolina, on January 4, 1858. He was the oldest child of slave parents. His mother was the only slave on the estate who could read. The family occupied a two-room cottage, presumably since they had higher status than most of the slaves on the plantation.

McAdoo attended the Hampton Institute, graduating in 1876. For three years, he was a schoolteacher in rural Virginia, in Pulaski and Accomack counties, and for several more years he taught at the Hampton preparatory school.

While teaching, McAdoo also spent much of his time touring with the Hampton Male Quartet. Around the end of 1885, he decided to join the Fisk Jubilee Singers led by Frederick J. Loudin. (Note: There is much uncertainty about the dates when McAdoo joined the Jubilee Singers and when he left them. Different sources give very different dates.) This troupe had sailed for England in April 1884, and for six years toured Australia, England, India and the Far East, returning to the USA in April 1890.

Around October 1899, McAdoo and soprano Belle F. Gibbons left Loudin's group and went back to the USA. There McAdoo formed his own company, the Virginia Concert Company or Virginia Jubilee Singers.

== Touring minstrel shows ==
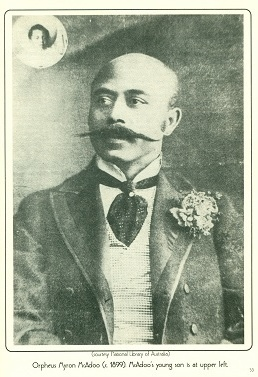
McAdoo in 1899, with portrait of his young son inset

The members of the new troupe included McAdoo's younger brother Eugene McAdoo, his future wife Mattie E. Allen (c. 1868-1936), Belle F. Gibbons, Madame J. Stewart Ball and Moses Hamilton Hodges. On May 29, 1890, Jubilee Singers left New York for England. The troupe then went to South Africa, opening on June 30, 1890, in the Cape Colony. The troupe received a very favorable reception. The Cape Argus said:

Singing such as given by the Virginia Concert Company has never before been heard in this country. Their selection consists of a peculiar kind of part song, the different voices joining in at most unexpected moments in a wild kind of harmony ... it is without doubt one of the attributes of the race to which they belong, and in their most sacred songs they seem at times inspired, as if they were lifting up their voices in praise of God with hopes of liberty.

McAdoo's company found strong racial prejudice in South Africa, particularly in Transvaal and the Orange Free State, with a 9 p.m. curfew for blacks. The natives had to get passes for travel in the country, and were not allowed to own a business.

Orpheus McAdoo married Mattie E. Allen on January 27, 1891, at Port Elizabeth, Cape Colony. (Note: McAdoo may have been unaware of the fact that the legality of his marriage to Mattie Allan was questioned, since Mattie was "almost white - her father is a white and her mother is an octoroon".)

In February 1891, President Paul Kruger saw the Jubilee Singers perform, perhaps entering a theater for the first time in his life, and was said to have been greatly moved by their rendition of "Nobody knows the trouble I have seen". The company closed in South Africa on January 25, 1892.

McAdoo's company began a tour of Australia and New Zealand in 1892. The McAdoos' son Myron was born in 1893. After three years, the company returned to Cape Town on June 29, 1895.

McAdoo had some difficulties with the baritone Will Thompson and with Mamie Edwards, who both left the company to live in Kimberley. In February 1897, McAdoo went to New York to hire replacements. He returned in June 1897 with eight new artists, including dancers, a comedian and female impersonator, and a juggler. McAdoo renamed the company the "Minstrel, Vaudeville and Concert Company". In August 1897, Thompson and Edwards rejoined the company.

A sample joke from this show, adapted from the plantation to the South African frontier, was,

One of the corner men asks a brother where he would like to be buried when he died. The brother replied that he would like a resting place in a nice, quiet Methodist cemetery and then asked where his questioner would like to be laid. The latter answered: 'In a Dutch cemetery.' 'Why?' asked the brother. The answer was: 'Because a Dutch cemetery is the last place the devil would go to look for a black man.'

== Last Australian tour ==
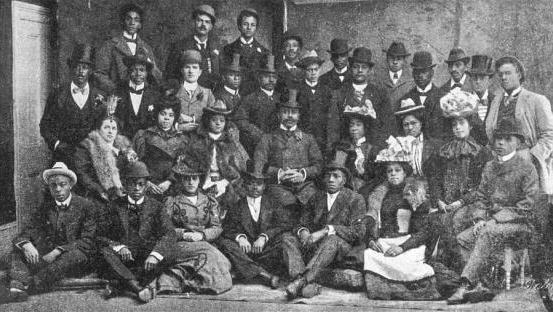
McAdoo's Georgia Minstrels in Australia in January 1900

In 1898, the company returned to Australia. McAdoo leased the Palace Theatre, Sydney, a vaudeville house, with plans to establish a stock company there.

In April 1899, McAdoo returned to the USA to recruit members for the Georgia Minstrels and Alabama Cakewalkers. Singer Flora Batson joined the company at this time. This full-size African-American minstrel troupe toured Australia from 1899 to May 1900.

In June 1899, M. B. Curtis's All-star American Minstrels embarked on an Australian tour. Members included Billy McClain and his wife Cordelia, and Ernest Hogan. Soon after the show reached Sydney, Curtis abandoned the show and Hogan took over.

The McClains transferred to Orpheus McAdoo's Georgia Minstrels. A review of the O.M. McAdoo Georgia Minstrels show in the Brisbane Opera House in January 1900 said "The two low comedians of the company−"Billy" McClain and C.W. Walker−had their hearers in fits of laughter throughout the evening, their reappearance on the stage after their turns in the first part being always the signal for fresh outbursts of mirth. Before the interval ballads were well rendered by Madame Cordelia ...

Orpheus McAdoo died in Sydney on July 17, 1900. He is buried in Waverley Cemetery, Sydney.

Mattie E. Allen of Columbus, Ohio provided the lyrics to "The Victory Song", set in 1919 by Frank W. Ford.

== In popular culture ==
In 2015 South African singer-songwriter David Kramer premiered a new musical at Cape Town's Fugard Theatre, "Orpheus in Africa", based on McAdoo's experiences in South Africa with his touring performers. The show was well-received, with reviewers focussing on the insight it provided South African audiences into the social, political and cultural implications of the visits at the time.

In 2024 Kramer put on a refreshed version of the show, this time called "Orpheus McAdoo: A Musical", in a first-time collaboration with the Cape Town Opera. The show opened on 18 October at the Artscape Theatre Centre.
