= Jennie Jackson =

American singer (c. 1852 – 1910)

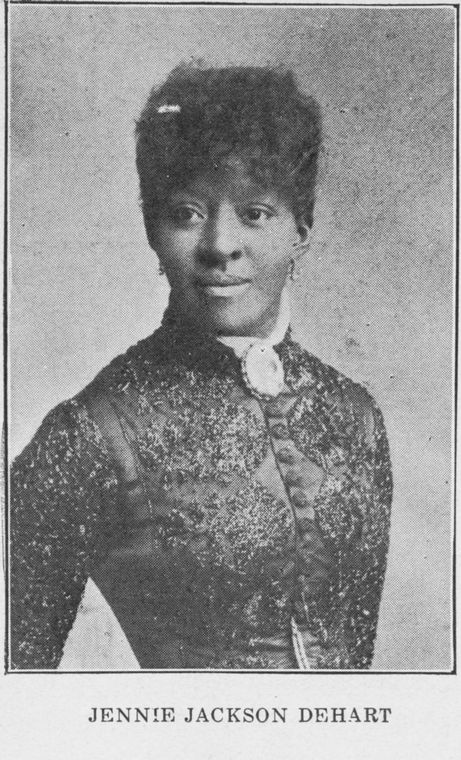
- Jennie Jackson DeHart, from a 1911 publication.
- Born: c. 1852; Kingston, Tennessee, US
- Died: May 4, 1910 (aged 57–58); Cincinnati, Ohio
- Other name: Jennie Jackson DeHart (after marriage)
- Occupation: singer
- Known for: original member of the Fisk Jubilee Singers

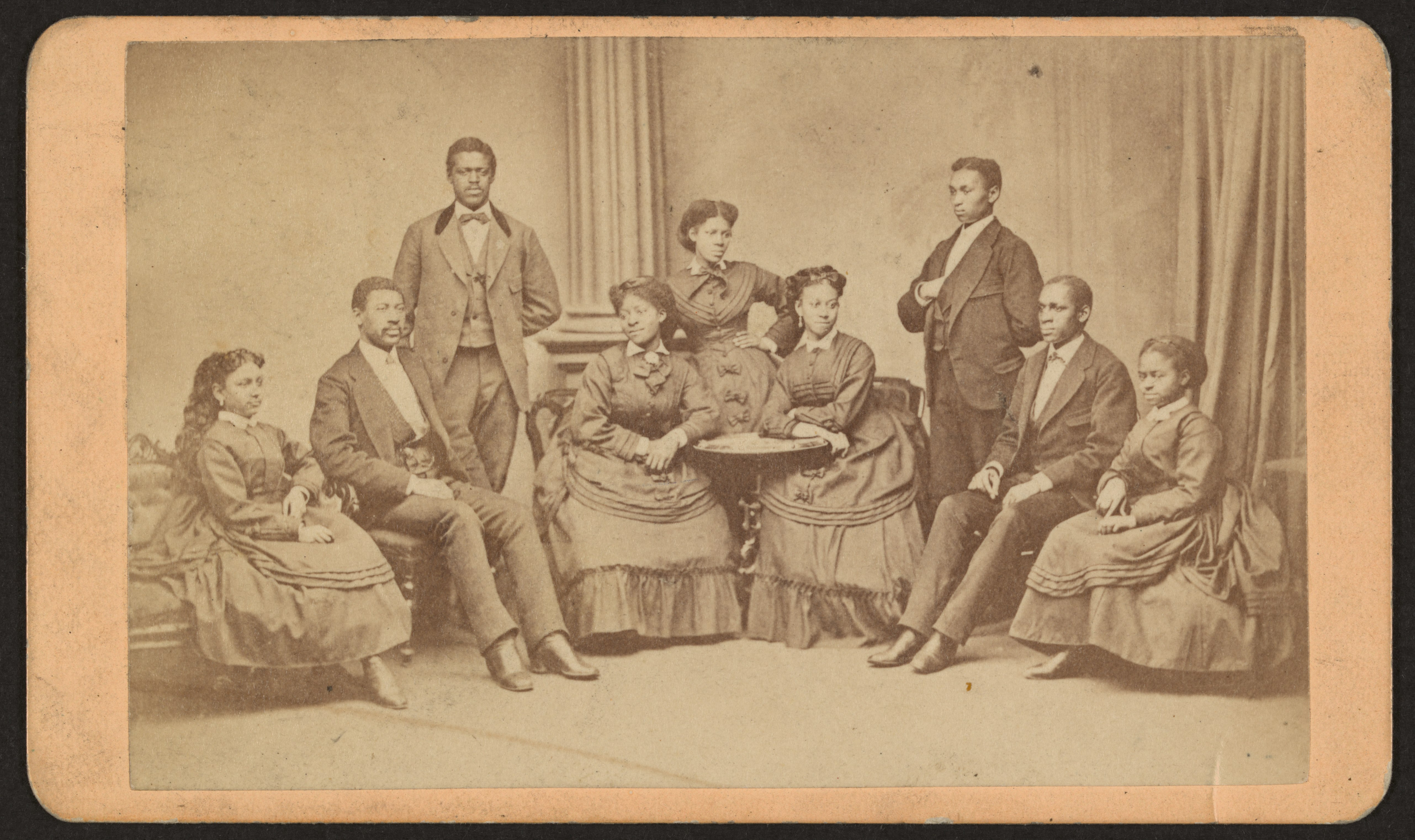
Jubilee Singers, Fisk University, Nashville, Tenn. LCCN2010647805; Jennie Jackson is fourth from the left in this grouping, seated between standing Isaac Dickerson and standing Maggie Porter

Jennie Jackson (c. 1852 – May 4, 1910) was an American singer and voice teacher. She was one of the original members of the Fisk Jubilee Singers, an African-American a cappella ensemble. She toured with the group from 1871 to 1877. In 1891 she formed her own sextet, the Jennie Jackson Concert Company.

== Early life ==
Jennie Jackson was born in Kingston, Tennessee in about 1852. Her grandfather was enslaved in the household of Andrew Jackson. Her parents were also enslaved, but she was raised in freedom from an early age, after her mother, a laundress, was freed. They lived in Nashville, Tennessee, during, and after the American Civil War. Jackson enrolled at Fisk Free Colored School as one of its first students after it opened in 1866. She joined the Jubilee Singers when they formed in 1871.

== Career ==
Jackson toured with the Fisk Jubilee Singers from 1871 to 1877, including concerts in Great Britain and Europe. They sang spirituals and other music in a cappella arrangements. Their tours raised funds for the Fisk University campus. Their audiences included Henry Ward Beecher, William Lloyd Garrison, Queen Victoria, Mark Twain, and Ulysses S. Grant. She left the group in 1877 when she fell ill with colitis. She was at the center of a large 1873 painting of the Fisk Jubilee Singers, by Edmund Havel, commissioned by Queen Victoria to commemorate their performance for her.

Jackson later sang with a reorganized version of the group and with fellow Fisk Jubilee Singer Maggie Porter Cole's group. In 1891 she formed her own sextet, the Jennie Jackson Concert Company. She also taught voice.

== Personal life ==
Jackson married Rev. Andrew J. DeHart in 1884, and lived in the Walnut Hills neighborhood of Cincinnati, Ohio. She was widowed in 1909, and she died at home in 1910, aged 58 years, in Cincinnati. In 1978, Jackson and the other original members of the Fisk Jubilee Singers were granted posthumous honorary Doctor of Music degrees from Fisk University.
