= Frederick J. Loudin =

American singer

Frederick Jeremiah Loudin
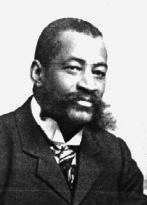

Background information
- Born: Frederick Jeremiah Loudin; January 1, 1836; Charlestown, Ohio, U.S.
- Died: November 3, 1904 (aged 68) Ravenna, Ohio, U.S.
- Genre: Spirituals
- Occupations: Teacher, singer, choir director, impresario, inventor, entrepreneur, manufacturer
- Instrument: Vocals
- Years active: 1872–1902

Frederick Jeremiah Loudin (c.1836 – November 3, 1904) was the leader of the Loudin Jubilee Singers. A talented baritone with a good voice he initially joined the Fisk Jubilee Singers. His commanding presence and ambitious personality caused him to emerge as an unofficial spokesperson during the four years he toured with them. He later became internationally famous as the leader of his own brand of Jubilee Singers, the Loudin Jubilee Singers, who toured internationally.

Frederick is credited for inventing the keychain.

== Background & Education ==
Loudin was born to free parents in Charlestown, Ohio, circa 1836. His parents moved to rural Ohio from Burlington, VT to be farmers, but when they learned that, although they had made regular financial contributions to Hiram College, their son would not be allowed to enter their preparatory program, they promptly removed their children from the local school and enrolled them in school in Ravenna, Ohio.

Frederick excelled in his studies and was therefore eligible for a privileged seat in the class. Many White parents took umbrage with this occurrence and pulled their children out of school, rather than have a "Negro" sit in a seat of honor they felt their children deserved based on skin color, rather than merit.

Loudin continued to show promise as a strong student and in his late teens began apprenticing for a printer. When asked to take over the literary department of the abolitionist newspaper for which he worked, Loudin elected to remain a compositor since he did not fully share the views of the paper's editor. Discouraged when he discovered that other white printers were unwilling to do business with him, Loudin gave up printing altogether.

== Musical career ==
The racism he experienced extended beyond school and work. In the Methodist church he had joined in Ravenna, Loudin was prohibited from singing in the choir. This was especially disappointing since Loudin, who had descended from a family of musicians, was gifted with a beautiful voice. This experience discouraged him from pursuing a formal education in music, despite his desire to sing.

While in his early 20s, Loudin moved to Pittsburgh where he met and married Harriet Johnson. Four years later, the couple moved to Memphis. Music played a large part in Loudin's life: teaching, learning the organ and leading a choir. When a friend told him about the Jubilee Singers, he wrote to George White. White, who was looking for a baritone, came to Memphis to hear Loudin sing. He invited him to join his choir.

Loudin, the oldest member of the Jubilee Singers, forged a strong relationship with George White over the next few years while touring Europe. A bitter rival of Ella Sheppard, he also fell out with Erastus Milo Cravath, Fisk’s president, over the Jubilees’ rights to rest and remuneration. In 1879, after the Jubilee Singers disbanded, Loudin and White reorganized the choir together, calling it the Fisk Jubilee Singers for the sake of name recognition though the group was no longer associated with Fisk University. After White was injured while directing the troupe at Chautauqua, New York, the group continued on a two-year tour of the U.S. and Canada, under Loudin's direction.

== Performances ==
In 1884 Loudin launched a six-year world tour. As sole director of the choir, Loudin became particularly careful about selecting his singers, investigating their backgrounds to ensure they had committed no misdeeds and that they came from cultured families. As a group now purely composed of and run by African Americans, it was important to Loudin that no character flaws could be pointed to as proof of their inferiority. Loudin led his choir to England, Ireland, Australia, New Zealand, India, Singapore, China, Japan, and finally across the American West. The success of this tour—Loudin and his singers earned enough to settle comfortably upon their return—was partly due to its management by Loudin's wife, who had traveled with him since his Jubilee Singers days. After returning to his hometown of Ravenna, Ohio and building his family a house, Loudin continued to tour with his troupe for the next twelve years.

== Business ventures ==
In addition to meeting the demands required by his career as a singer and choir director, Loudin somehow found time for political and business pursuits. In the 1890s, after returning from his world tour, Loudin became the owner of two shoe manufacturing companies and patented two inventions. In 1879, and again in 1893, he served as a delegate to a national conference of black men. He joined anti-lynching journalist Ida B. Wells-Barnett and Frederick Douglass in advocating for the representation of African Americans at the World’s Columbian Exposition in Chicago. Loudin also maintained his relationship with Fisk throughout his life—sending the school regular updates on his choir's work abroad and visiting the school whenever he could—despite the fact he was never a student at Fisk or any other college.

== Manufacturing ==
On November 17, 1892, the F.J. Loudin Boot and Shoe Manufacturing Company was dedicated in Ravenna, Ohio. By April 1893 the company was employing an integrated staff of nearly 70 men. This in and of itself was a revolutionary act in Ravenna of the 1890s. Their workers were making 300 shoes/day, under the Loudin brand.

The staff and the shareholders were integrated, as well, but in the end, none of this was able to help the company stay afloat. Within one year of opening the company was bankrupt and had to close up shop. During this time Loudin’s Fisk Jubilee Singers were on tour under the direction of their choir director cum businessman.

Frederick Loudin was at the height of his creative abilities, as exemplified by the two inventions for fasteners which he patented during this period of time.

== Death ==
Loudin had a heart attack while on tour in Scotland during the fall of 1902, almost thirty years after he had first joined the Jubilee Singers. He died in Ravenna two years later.

== Documentaries ==
Jubilee Singers: Sacrifice and Glory. Alexandria, VA: PBS Home Video, 2000. The American Experience series. VHS. CD

Fisk Jubilee Singers. In bright mansions. Nashville, TN: Curb Records, 2003. Enhanced CD. For children

== Selected bibliography ==
Lynn Abbott & Doug Serott, Out of sight: The rise of African American popular music, 1889–1895, Univ. Press of Mississippi, c2002. Deborah Hopkinson. A band of angels: a story inspired by the Jubilee Singers. New York, N.Y.: Atheneum Books for Young Readers, c1999 Spirituals, song collections Jubilee songs: as sung by the Jubilee Singers, of Fisk University, (Nashville, Tenn.) under the auspices of the American Missionary Association. New York, Chicago: Biglow & Main, c1872

James Welden Johnson and J. Rosamond Johnson, compilers. The Books of American Negro spirituals. New York: Viking Press, c1940.
