= Marguerite Pennybacker =

American social worker

- Born: Marguerite Collins Pennybacker; March 31, 1903; Mooreville, Texas, U.S.
- Died: after January 1950
- Other names: Marguerite Pennybacker Anderson, Margaret Anderson, Peggy Pennybacker
- Occupations: Singer, social worker, clubwoman

Marguerite Collins Pennybacker Anderson (March 31, 1903 – after January 1950) was an American social worker, clubwoman and singer based in Fort Worth, Texas.

== Early life and education ==
Pennybacker was born in Mooreville, Texas, the daughter of William Booker Pennybacker and Ida Leigh Wilson Collins Pennybacker. She graduated from Fort Worth Colored High School in 1920, and studied music at Bishop College before earning a bachelor's degree at Fisk University. She was a soloist with Fisk's Mozart Society, and a member of the Fisk Jubilee Singers. She earned a master's degree in religious education at Teachers College, Columbia University in 1928. During her time in New York City, she lived in the household of a fellow Fisk alumnus, civil rights activist William Lloyd Imes.

== Career ==
Pennybacker was a soloist at the wedding of Countee Cullen and Yolande Du Bois in 1928, and gave a vocal recital in New York City that year. "Her phrasing is impeccable, her interpretation intelligent," according to one critic at the event. "There is smoothness of utterance and her diction is a delight." She also sang on The Philco Hour, a radio program.

After graduate school, Pennybacker traveled in Europe, then worked at Woodland Center, a settlement house in Cleveland, Ohio for three years. She acted in a plays at Woodland. While in Cleveland, she conducted and sang solos in the choir at Cory Methodist Episcopal Church. In 1930 she taught at the second Religious Conference for Young People at Lincoln University. She returned to Fort Worth in 1931, where she was executive secretary of the Council of Negro Charities for nine years. In 1936, Pennybacker co-founded a Black theatre program in Fort Worth, and was a charter member of the Fort Worth chapter of Alpha Kappa Alpha sorority.

In 1940, Anderson spoke to a luncheon meeting of the white Junior Chamber of Commerce in Fort Worth, on "the need for better understanding between the races." Also in 1940 she was named supervisor of the Butler Place housing project in Fort Worth, becoming "the first Negro woman to be appointed to such an administrative position in the history of the United States Housing Authority.". She spoke to community groups about her work. In 1941 she was appointed to an advisory board of the National Youth Administration, and another committee to organize a Black branch of the YWCA in Fort Worth. In 1942, she directed a chorus at the graduation ceremony of Southwestern Baptist Theological Seminary. By 1945, she was a social worker in Dallas, speaking on the "Relations of the Race Question to Postwar Planning".

== Personal life ==
Pennybacker had a son, Roland Wyatt, born in 1932, who became an organist, choral director, and vocal coach. She was a widow by the 1940 census, and she was alive in 1950 to provide information for her mother's death certificate.
