= Patti J. Malone =

American singer

- Patti Malone Monument, Slave Cemetery, Athens, Alabama

Background information
- Born: 1855; Athens, Alabama, United States
- Died: January 20, 1897; Omaha, Nebraska, United States
- Genres: Spiritual
- Instrument: mezzo-soprano
- Years active: 1877–1897
- Formerly of: Fisk Jubilee Singers

Patti J. Malone (born 1858, at Cedars Plantation in Athens, Alabama), was best known as a mezzo-soprano vocalist.

== Biography ==
=== Childhood ===
Malone was born into slavery in antebellum Alabama and was sold to the Clack Plantation in Texas. Her hometown was the scene of numerous clashes between Union and Confederate troops during the American Civil War, as well as alleged atrocities committed against the civilian population by the former. Later in life, Malone recounted scars her mother received from their enslavers, as well as her anxiety when her mother helped hide their enslaver from patrolling Union troops. After the war, Malone enrolled in the Trinity School, a school for the children of former slaves founded by the American Missionary Association in Athens. Malone's enrollment at Trinity was not without cost or risk, because local residents refused to hire African Americans who sent their children to the school. As a child, Malone was forced to work for her former enslaver's family as a condition of her mother's employment. Despite this, and considerable harassment and intimidation from white children in the community, she was able to pursue her education at Trinity. She is reported to have been so determined to secure an education, that she would attend school while so ill that she had to lie down for lessons while there.

=== Adulthood ===
Fisk Jubilee Singers, c. 1880 (Patti Malone at far right)

After finishing her studies at Trinity, Malone moved to Nashville, Tennessee, where she enrolled at Fisk University, which had also been established by the American Missionary Association. There, she experienced a change that would shape the remainder of her life. At the time, Fisk was a new, struggling institution, without its own permanent campus and buildings. As a response to this, the university chose nine of its students to form a musical touring group to raise funds for the school. The initial effort was an unexpected success, raising over $100,000.00. After the conclusion of this first fundraising tour, the university disbanded the troupe, but it reorganized itself as an independent group, and embarked on a second world tour. Malone had originally been recruited for Fisk by the original chaperone of the Jubilee Singers, Miss Wells, the principal at Trinity. Malone was selected to fill a vacancy in the group caused by the illness of one of the original members, and left Nashville to join the group in Germany in 1877. During Malone's tenure in the group, she performed throughout Europe, Australia and New Zealand, including a command performance before German Emperor Wilhelm I.

Malone's death from an unspecified malady, on January 20, 1897, in Omaha, Nebraska, brought accolades and notes from around the world. The Cleveland Gazette is reported to have recorded that "It is safe to say that no woman of her race ever sang in so many different countries of the world as Miss Patti J. Malone." Her death was even noted in the press in New Zealand, where the Jubilee Singers had toured ten years earlier.
