= Thomas Rutling =

American tenor singer

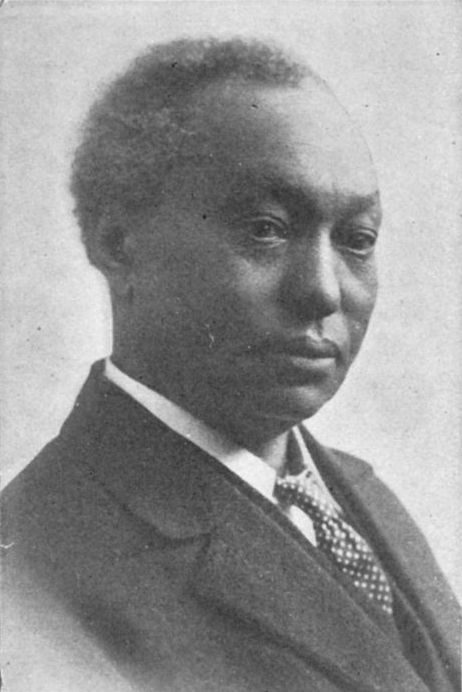
Thomas Rutling

Thomas Rutling (December 24, 1854 – April 26, 1915) was an American former slave who became an original member of the Fisk Jubilee Singers, a choral group that toured throughout the United States and Europe. He was a tenor in the group.

== Biography ==
Rutling was born on December 24, 1854, into slavery. His father had either been sold by slavers or had run away before his birth. Rutling was the youngest out of nine children. His mother was sold when he was age three. Rutling never found out the fate of his parents. At age eight, Rutling was put into fieldwork, but his master soon redirected him to household work. In 1865, Union soldiers freed him from slavery.

As a free man, Rutling travelled to Nashville, where his sister taught him to read and write. Rutling then started to work for a surgeon and then enrolled in high school at Fisk University. Thomas paid for his tuition by becoming a waiter for the teachers. He attended the Literary Society's weekly debates, which helped with his linguistic skills.

In 1871, Rutling joined the university's choir as a tenor. They toured across the country to raise funds and spread awareness for Fisk University. The choir was soon named the Fisk Jubilee Singers, since they sang renditions of Negro spirituals.

Rutling spent seven years touring with the Fisk Jubilee Singers in the United States, the United Kingdom and Europe. At the end of that period, he became ill and moved to Switzerland at the end of a tour. He supposedly fathered a son in Austria.

Rutling then returned to England, where he was sponsored as a singer by August Manns, an orchestral director. When public interest in his singing waned, he became a voice teacher at schools in Britain. In 1907, he toured church halls. Rutling published a short autobiography in Bradford and Devon.

== Death ==
Thomas Rutling died on April 26, 1915, at 97 Valley Drive, Harrogate. His death may have been due to liver cancer. Rutling's friends paid for his funeral and plot in Grove Road Cemetery, including the stone cross inscribed "Late Jubilee Singer, Fisk University. They sing the song of the lamb".

Rutling was remembered with love and affection, his impact (mainly in Britain) was significant. He was remembered for his singing, his eloquence, and his role as a representative of the Afro-American arts.
