= Flora Batson =

American singer

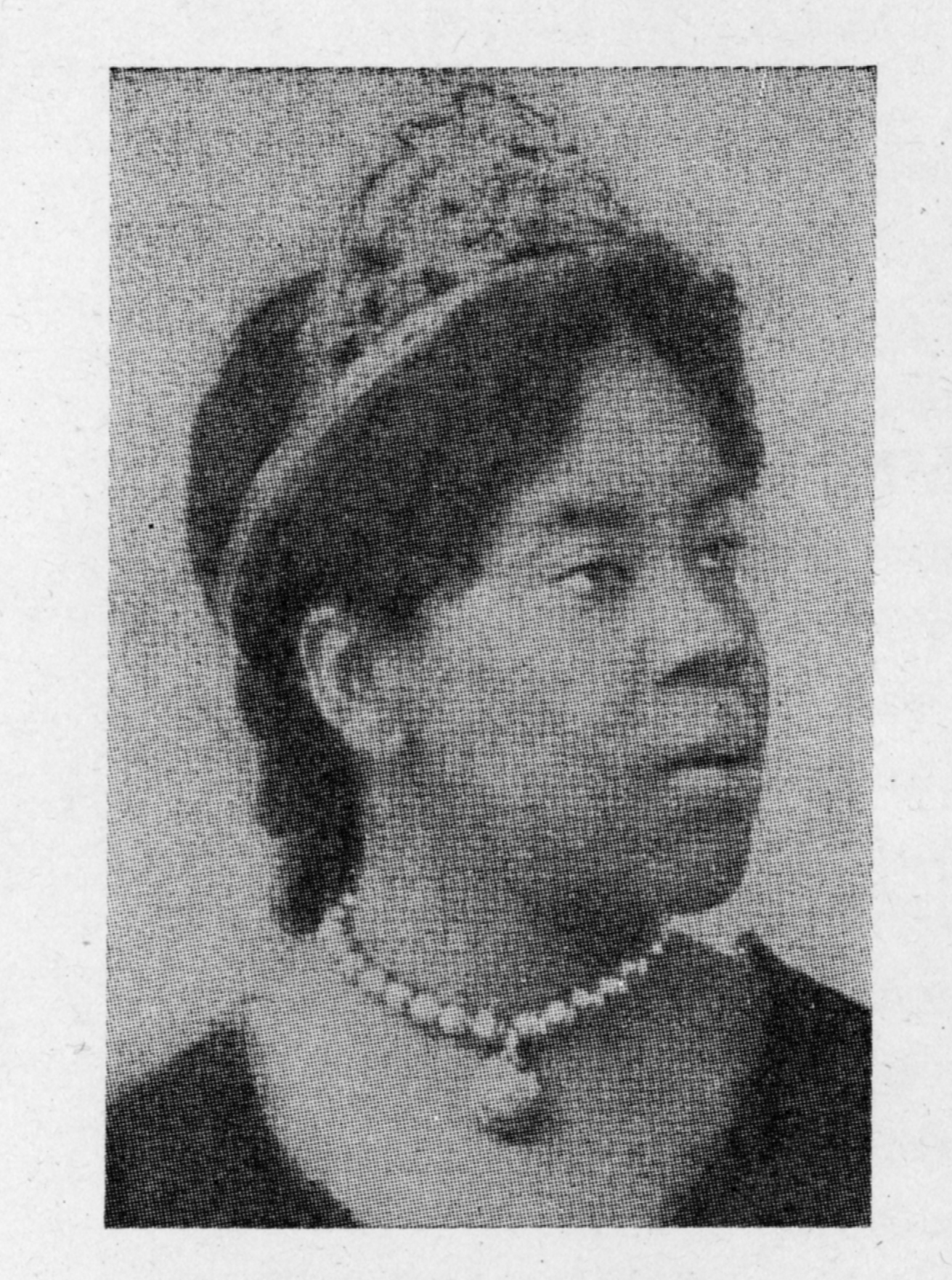

Background information
- Also known as: The Double-Voiced Queen of Song and The Colored Jenny Lind
- Born: Flora Marie Batson; April 16, 1864; Washington, D.C., U.S.
- Died: December 1, 1906 (aged 42) Philadelphia, Pennsylvania, U.S.
- Genres: light opera, popular music
- Years active: 1885–1906

Flora Batson (1864–1906) was a popular and well-known African-American concert singer, nicknamed "The Double-Voiced Queen of Song" because of her soprano-baritone range. She was also called "the colored Jenny Lind" in the press.

== Biography ==
Batson was born in Washington, D.C., on April 16, 1864. She began singing at a young age in her church choir. Batson sang professionally at Storer College in Harpers Ferry, West Virginia for two years before moving on at the age of thirteen. In 1885, she began touring with the Bergen Star Company and became internationally known. She was a more modern version of Marie Selika Williams, Madam Flower "Bronze Melba", and Matilda Sissieretta Joyner Jones. She performed with Jones in 1885 in Providence, Rhode Island and was sometimes considered her rival.

=== Marriage and family ===
Flora Batson and her mother moved to Providence, Rhode Island when she was three years old. Her father died shortly before from war wounds.

She married John Bergen on December 13, 1887. Their interracial marriage was fodder for tabloids. Bergen and Batson did not have children together, but she did become the stepmother to his son, Gary. After Bergen died, Batson remarried to Gerard Millar, whom she performed with as well.

=== Death and burial ===
Batson died from uremia in Philadelphia on December 1, 1906.

== Career ==
Flora Batson's professional career officially began when she was 13 years old. Batson sang for two years with Storer College, Harper's Ferry. Following that, she spent three years singing in J.W. Hamilton's Lecture Bureau for the People's Church of Boston. Batson then sang for one year in Red Path's Lecture and Lyceum Bureau, followed by one year of temperance work. Then, in 1885, Mr. John Bergen became Flora Batson's manager, and she became a member of the Bergen Star Company. She joined the company as a last-minute backup to soprano Nellie Brown, who had to cancel due to prior commitments.

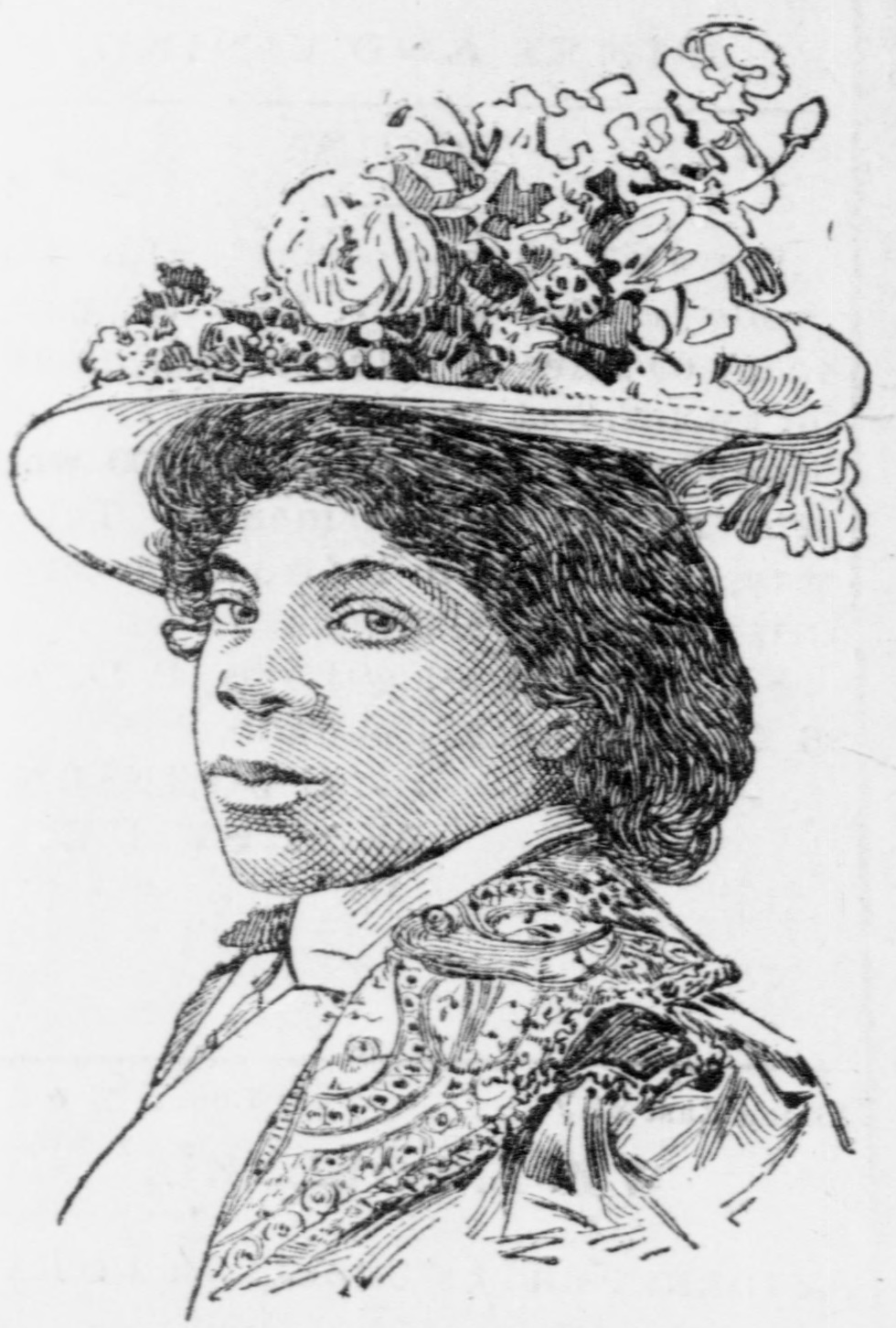
1903 drawing of Batson from The Colored American

Bergen promoted Batson's career and rivalry with Jones, even dubbing Batson "The Real Patti" in response to Jones' promotion as "The Black Patti." Supported by Bergen's management and touring company, with a reputation as the only double voiced soloist of color in the United States, she performed all over the world. She sang before royalty and religious leaders such as Queen Victoria of England, Pope Leo the Eighth, Queen Emma of Hawaii and the Royal Family of New Zealand.

After Bergen's death in 1896, Batson toured with a variety of singing companies. She sang duets with Gerard Millar in the South before the War Company. They also toured together in Australia in 1899 and 1900 with Orpheus McAdoo's Georgia Minstrels and Genuine Alabama Cake Walkers.

In March 1889, Batson performed at the First Presbyterian Church of Vicksburg, now the Bethel AME Church, in Vicksburg, Mississippi. Advertisements for this event proclaimed that she would wear the crown with which she was hailed the "Queen of Song" by the citizens of Philadelphia, and diamond necklace presented to her by the people of New York and diamonds from the people of Rhode Island. The successful event garnered so much attention, there had been talk of moving it to an opera house, though it remained at the church. The cost of admission was 25 cents.
