= Greene E. Evans =

American politician

- Born: September 19, 1848; Tennessee
- Died: October 1, 1914 (aged 66); Chicago
- Occupation: Politician
- Known for: Member of the Tennessee House of Representatives

Greene E. Evans (September 19, 1848 – October 1, 1914) was a porter, groundskeeper, laborer, deputy wharf-master, city councilman, census enumerator, mail agent, teacher, and state legislator in Tennessee. He was born in Tennessee, and enslaved early in his life.

He studied at Fisk University in Nashville and lived in Memphis. A Republican, he served in the Tennessee General Assembly from 1885 to 1887. He attended the 1885 World’s Industrial and Cotton Centennial Exposition in New Orleans as a representative of the General Assembly and was an honored guest.

He was a singer and belonged to a lyceum. He eventually settled in Chicago with his wife and only child, working as a coal dealer.

He lived in Memphis in Shelby County, Tennessee. He died in Chicago, Illinois.

== See also ==
- African American officeholders from the end of the Civil War until before 1900
- African Americans in Tennessee
