= Fisk Jubilee Singers =

African-American a cappella ensemble

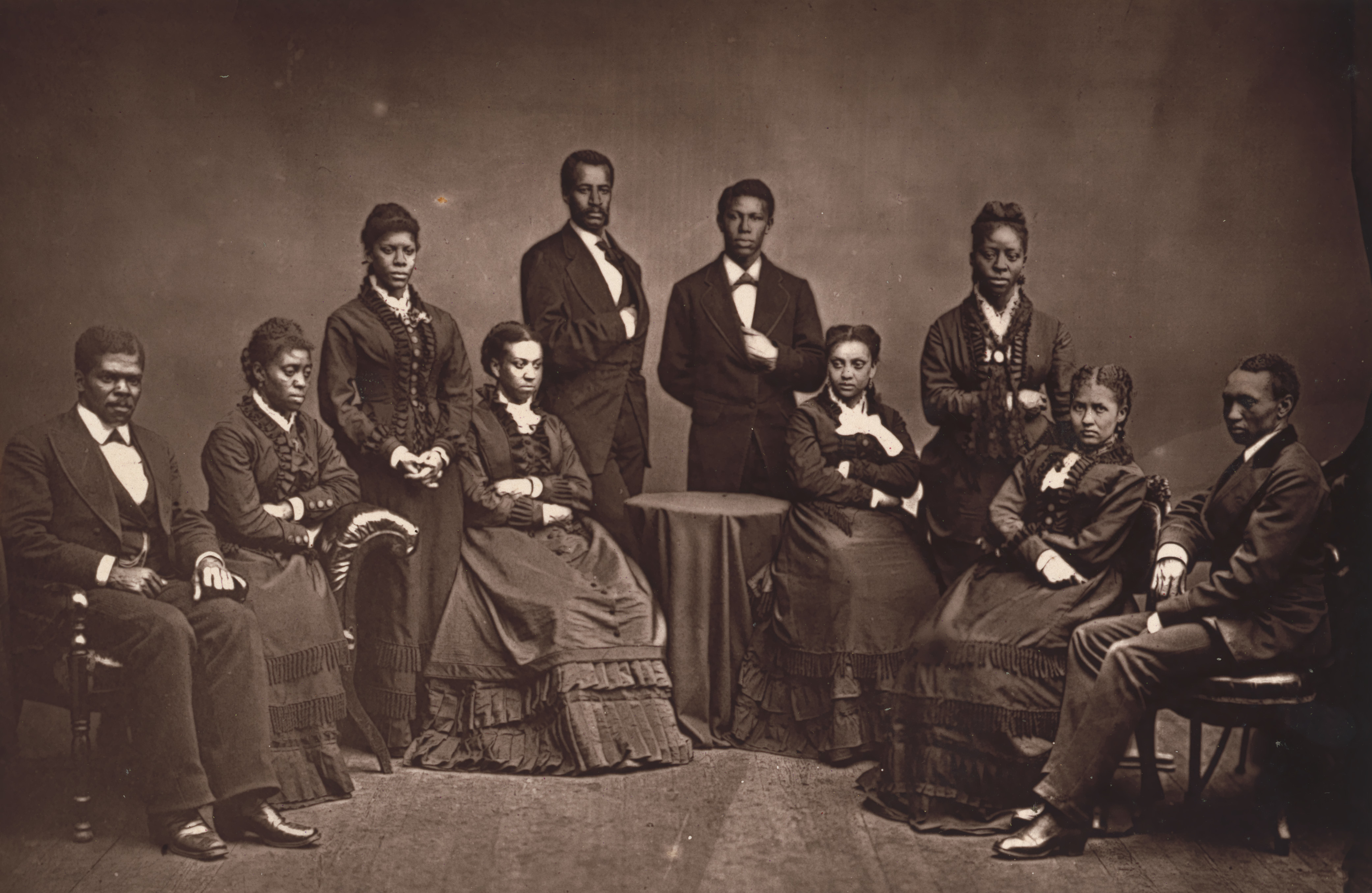
- Fisk Jubilee Singers, 1875

Background information
- Genre: A cappella
- Years active: 1871–present

The Fisk Jubilee Singers are an African American a cappella ensemble, consisting of students at Fisk University in Nashville, Tennessee. The first group was organized in 1871 to tour and raise funds for college. Their early repertoire consisted mostly of traditional spirituals, but included some songs by Stephen Foster. The original group toured along the Underground Railroad path in the United States, as well as performing in Europe. Later 19th-century groups also toured in Europe.

In 2002, the Library of Congress honored their 1909 recording of "Swing Low, Sweet Chariot" by adding it in the United States National Recording Registry. In 2008 they were awarded a National Medal of Arts.

== History ==
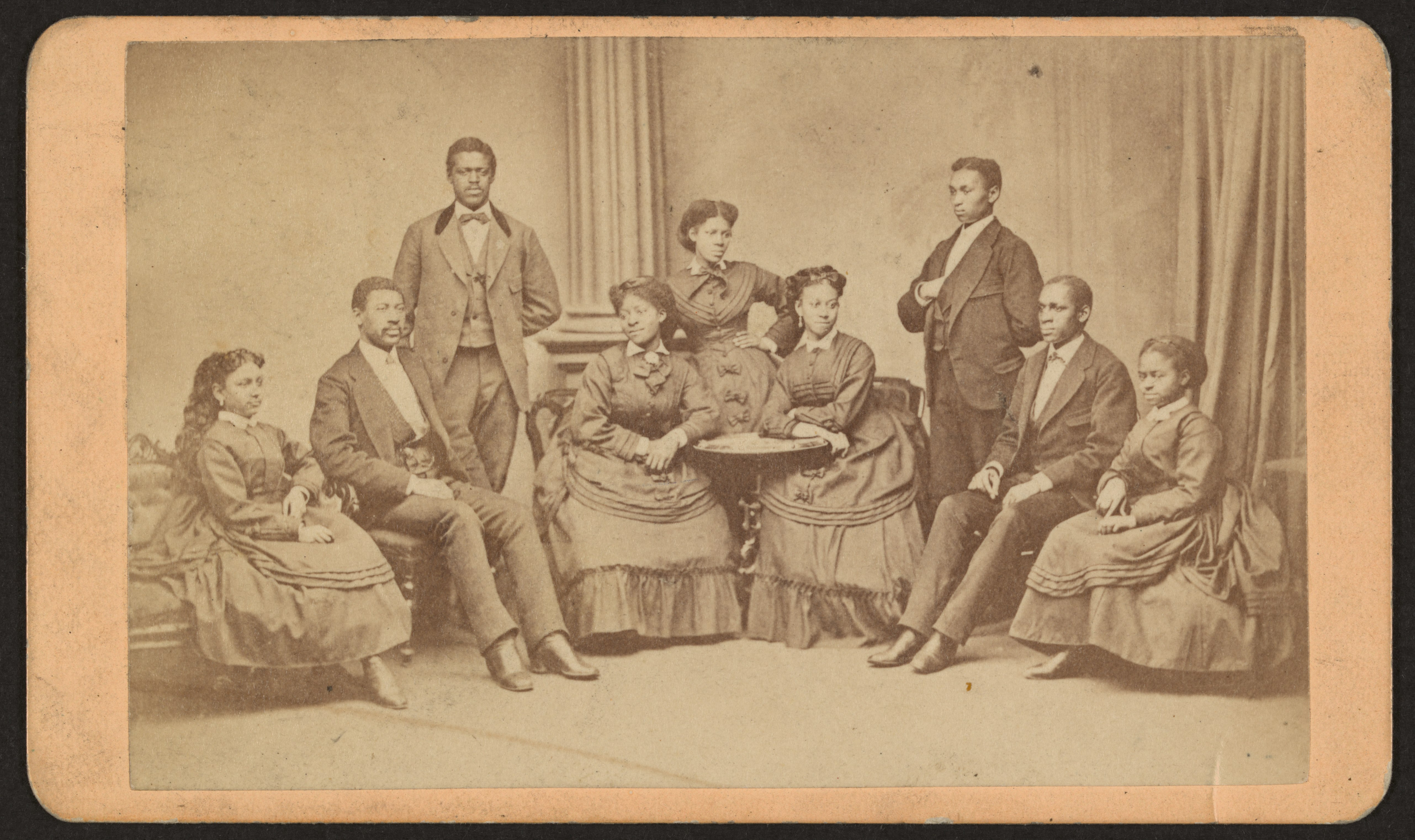
Fisk Jubilee Singers, circa 1870s

The singers were organized as a fundraising effort for Fisk University. The historically black college in Nashville, Tennessee, was founded by the American Missionary Association and local supporters after the end of the American Civil War to educate freedmen and other young African Americans. In 1871, the five-year-old university was facing serious financial difficulty. To avert bankruptcy and closure, Fisk's treasurer and music director, George Leonard White, a white Northern missionary dedicated to music and proving that African Americans were the intellectual equals of whites, gathered a nine-member student chorus, consisting of four black men (Isaac Dickerson, Ben Holmes, Greene Evans, Thomas Rutling) and five black women (Ella Sheppard, Maggie Porter, Minnie Tate, Jennie Jackson, Eliza Walker) to go on tour to earn money for the university. On October 6, 1871, the group of students, consisting of two quartets and a pianist, started their U.S. tour under White's direction. Their first tour performance was in Cincinnati, Ohio. Over the next 18 months, the group toured through Ohio, Pennsylvania, New York, Connecticut, Rhode Island, New Jersey, Massachusetts, Maryland, and Washington, D.C.

"Swing Low, Sweet Chariot"
"Swing Low, Sweet Chariot" performed by the Fisk Jubilee Singers

After a concert in Cincinnati, the group donated their small profit to the victims of the Great Chicago Fire of October 1871. As soprano Maggie Porter recalled, "We had thirty dollars and sent every penny to Chicago and didn't have anything for ourselves." The mayor of Chillicothe, Ohio, expressed "thanks to these young colored people for their liberality in giving the proceeds of last evening’s concert to our relief fund for the Chicago sufferers." The group traveled on to Columbus, Ohio, where lack of funding, poor hotel conditions, and overall mistreatment from the press and audiences left them feeling tired and discouraged.

The group and their pastor, Henry Bennett, prayed about whether to continue with the tour. White went off to pray as well; he believed that they needed a name to capture audience attention. The next morning, he met with the singers and said, "Children, it shall be Jubilee Singers in memory of the Jewish year of Jubilee." This was a reference to Jubilee described in the book of Leviticus in the Bible. Each fiftieth Pentecost was followed by a "year of jubilee" in which all slaves would be set free. Since most of the students at Fisk University and their families were newly freed slaves, the name "Jubilee Singers" seemed fitting.

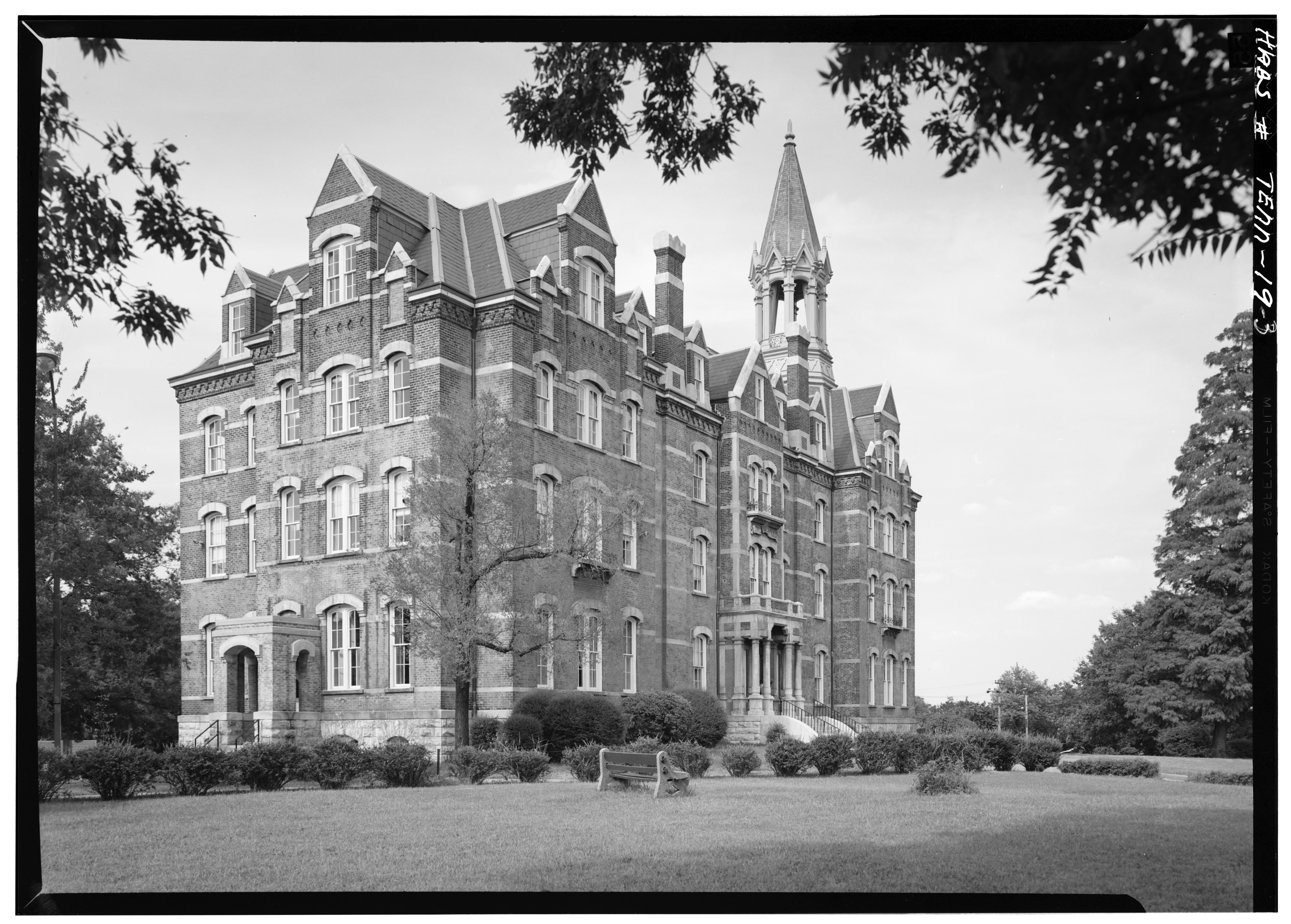
Jubilee Hall at Fisk University

The Jubilee Singers' performances were a departure from the familiar "black minstrel" genre of white musicians performing in blackface. One early review of the group's performance was headlined "Negro Minstrelsy in Church – Novel Religious Exercise", while further reviews highlighted the fact that this group of Negro minstrels were, oddly enough, "genuine negroes". "Those who have only heard the burnt cork caricatures of negro minstrelsy have not the slightest conception of what it really is," Doug Seroff quotes one review of a concert by the group as saying. This was not a uniquely American response to the group's performance, but was typical in audience receptions in Europe as well: "From the first the Jubilee music was more or less of a puzzle to the critics; and even among those who sympathised with their mission there was no little difference of opinion as to the artistic merit of their entertainments. Some could not understand the reason for enjoying so thoroughly as almost everyone did these simple unpretending songs."

As the tour continued, audiences came to appreciate the singers' voices, and the group began to be praised. The Jubilee Singers are credited with the early popularization of the Negro spiritual tradition among white and northern audiences in the late 19th century; many were previously unaware of its existence. At first the slave songs were never sung in public, according to Ella Sheppard; "they were sacred to our parents, who used them in their religious worship and shouted over them...It was only after many months that gradually our hearts were opened to the influence of these friends and we began to appreciate the wonderful beauty and power of our songs. After the rough start, the first United States tours eventually earned $40,000 for Fisk University.

In early 1872 the group performed at the World's Peace Jubilee and International Musical Festival in Boston, and they were invited to perform for President Ulysses S. Grant at the White House in March of that year. They gave a separate performance in Washington, D.C., for Vice President Schuyler Colfax and members of the U.S. Congress. They traveled next to New York, where they performed before enthusiastic audiences at preacher Henry Ward Beecher’s Plymouth Church in Brooklyn and at Steinway Hall in Manhattan. They garnered national attention and generous donations. Staying in the New York area for six weeks, by the time they returned to Nashville, they had raised the full $20,000 White had promised the university.

In a tour of Great Britain and Europe in 1873, the group, by then with 11 members, performed "Steal Away to Jesus" and "Go Down, Moses" for Queen Victoria in April. They returned the following year, they sailed to Europe again, touring from May 1875 to July 1878 and drawing rave reviews. This tour raised an estimated $150,000 for the university, funds used to construct Fisk's first permanent building. Named Jubilee Hall, the building was designated a National Historic Landmark in 1975 and still stands.

The original Jubilee Singers disbanded in 1878 because of their grueling touring schedule. As Ella Sheppard, one of the original Jubilee Singers recalled, "our strength was failing under the ill treatment at hotels, on railroads, poorly attended concerts, and ridicule." Porter also said, "There were many times, when we didn’t have place to sleep or anything to eat. Mr. White went out and brought us some sandwiches and tried to find some place to put us up." Other times while the singers would wait in the railway station, White "and some other man of the troupe waded through sleet or snow or rain from hotel to hotel seeking shelter for us".

A new Jubilee Singers choir was formed in 1879 under the direction of George L. White and singer Frederick J. Loudin. This troupe, formed by White, consisted of Jennie Jackson, Maggie Porter, Georgia Gordon, Mabel Lewis, Patti Malone, Hinton Alexander, Benjamin W. Thomas, Ella Sheppard (until 1882), and newcomers R. A. Hall, Mattie Lawrence, and George E. Barrett. A. Cushing was the agent who managed their bookings.

Fisk University eventually reintroduced their own Jubilee Singers, starting with an 1890 tour directed by Ella Sheppard, then the 1909 Jubilee Quartet directed by Agnes and John W. Work, which subsequent directors and singers continued for decades.

The original Jubilee Singers introduced slave songs to the world in 1871 and were instrumental in preserving this unique American musical tradition known today as Negro spirituals. They influenced many other troupes of jubilee singers who would go on to make their own contributions to the genre, such as the Original Nashville Students. They broke racial barriers in the US and abroad in the late 19th century. They raised money in support of their beloved school due to it failing. In 1999, the Fisk Jubilee Singers were featured in the documentary Jubilee Singers: Sacrifice and Glory, which aired on PBS' American Experience. In July 2007, the Fisk Jubilee Singers went on a sacred journey to Ghana at the invitation of the U.S. Embassy. It was a history making event, as it was their first time visit to Ghana. In 2008, the Fisk Jubilee Singers were selected as a recipient of the 2008 National Medal of Arts, the nation's highest honor for artists and patrons of the arts. The award was presented by President George W. Bush and First Lady Laura Bush during a ceremony at the White House.

=== Directors ===
- 1871–1878 — George Leonard White, founding director. White had organized groups of singers with Ella Sheppard under the Fisk name since 1866. White asked Sheppard to help prepare the group for its inaugural tour in 1871. Sheppard continued as assistant director and performance conductor for the group. Fisk University President Erastus M. Cravath (and White's brother-in-law) disbanded the original Fisk Jubilee Singers in July 1878. It would not re-form under the auspices of Fisk University for years. However, groups independent of Fisk University carried on the name and legacy.
- 1879–1898 — George Leonard White and Frederick Loudin established another group in September 1879—not associated with Fisk University—and shared the musical directorship for about two years. Frederick Loudin continued as sole director, with some organizational and musical involvement by White. From 1889–1898, the group was named Loudin’s Fisk Jubilee Singers. In 1884, Maggie Porter, who had sung in both the original group and Loudin’s group, and her new husband, singer Daniel Cole, formed their own separate company, calling it Fisk Jubilee Singers and toured the U.S., Canada and Europe during the 1880s and 90s.
- 1890–1891— Ella Sheppard Moore, for many years the assistant director and accompanist of the original and independent Jubilee Singers, returned to Fisk in 1890 and began training a Fisk Jubilee Singers group for touring. She collected new students from the Mozart Society on campus, and they went on tour of the North until May 1891. Since this tour didn't make as much of a profit as the originals, they stopped touring and remained on campus as the Jubilee Club. They performed for the Prussian Prince Henry in 1902 when he visited Nashville.
- 1899–1923 — John Wesley Work, Jr. (a.k.a. John W. Work II) championed "Jubilee music" at Fisk University since joining the faculty in 1896. In 1899, University President E. M. Cravath, who had dissolved the original group 20 years earlier, commissioned Work with the second recreation. Work shared directorship with his wife, Agnes. Ella Sheppard Moore assisted, and continued directing the Jubilee Club on campus. In Folk Song of the American Negro, Work proclaimed, "Mrs. Ella Sheppard Moore…has been so closely connected with the presentation of [Negro folk songs] to the world, so intimately associated with their preservation that it is impossible to think of the one separate and apart from the other." Due to budgetary constraints, it operated as Fisk University Jubilee Quartet from 1909–1916, in which Work sang First Tenor. It is this group that made the first sound recordings of spirituals in authentic rendering, including the 1909 recording of "Swing Low, Sweet Chariot", which was added to the United States National Recording Registry in 2002.
- 1923–1927 — The Rev. James A. Myers, second tenor in the Fisk University Jubilee Quartet, took leadership of that group and the Fisk Jubilee Singers after John W. Work II resigned.
- 1928–1947 — Henrietta Crawley Myers (a.k.a. Mrs. James A. Myers), a singer under John W. Work II, took directorship of the group after her husband passed. During these years, The Jubilee Singers, as she called it, was made up of former members of the Fisk University Jubilee Singers. Despite serving on the Fisk University faculty and the group maintaining their international prominence under her direction, it is not clear whether this group was directly affiliated with Fisk University.
- 1947–1956 — John Wesley Work III
- 1957–1986 — Matthew Washington Kennedy
- 1968–1972 — Richard Turner III
- 1973–1975 — Oscar M. Henry
- 1986–1987 — Horace Clarence Boyer
- 1987–1990 ― Anthony E. Williams
- 1990–1994 — Delise P. Hall
- 1994–2022 — Paul T. Kwami
- 2022–2023 — Anthony Williams
- 2024–present — G. Preston Wilson, Jr.

=== Jubilee Day ===
Fisk University commemorates the anniversary of the singers' first tour by celebrating Jubilee Day on October 6 each year.

== Recent accomplishments ==
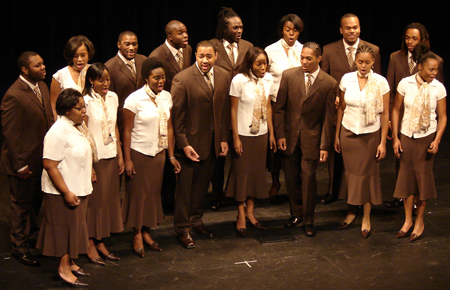
The Fisk Jubilee Singers' performance at the Dixie Carter Performing Arts and Academic Enrichment Center in Huntingdon, Tennessee in 2008.

The Jubilee Singers continue to perform as a touring ensemble of Fisk University students. As of 2000, the group had 14 members who sang without instrumental accompaniment and with their director offstage. They also have appeared with popular performers including Danny Glover, Hank Williams Jr., Faith Hill, and Shania Twain. The group was also inducted into the Gospel Music Hall of Fame.

Noted as the premier carriers of the Negro spirituals, the Fisk Jubilee Singers were selected in November 2008 as one of nine recipients of the 2008 National Medal of Arts. The award, which is the highest recognition for artistic excellence given by the United States Government, was presented by President George W. Bush and First Lady Laura Bush.

In 2021, the Fisk Jubilee Singers won their first Grammy at the 63rd Annual Grammy Awards.

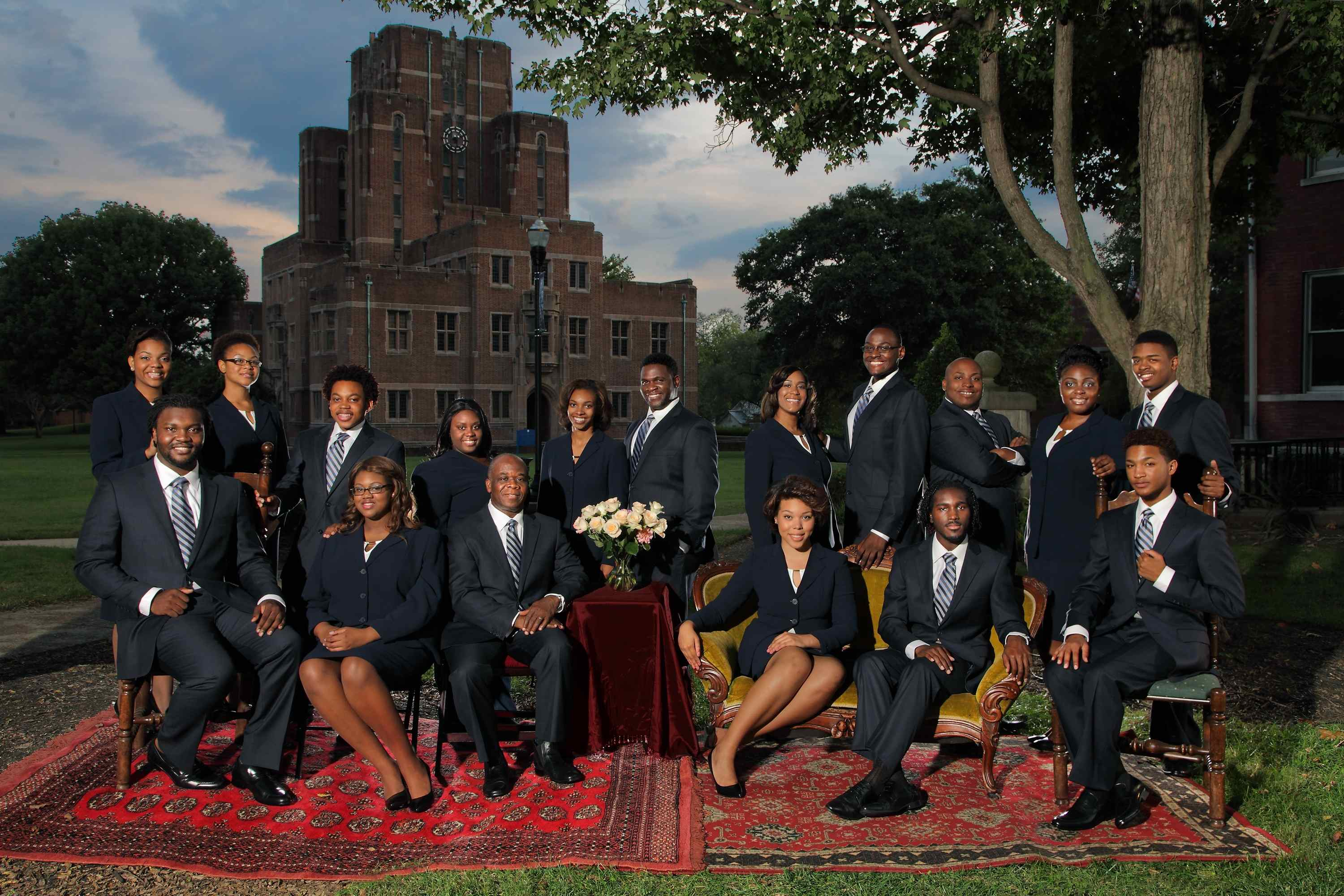
Fisk Jubilee Singers 12 13 Ensemble

=== Representation in arts and culture ===
The documentary Jubilee Singers: Sacrifice and Glory, aired on PBS' American Experience in 2000, with repeat airings as recent as 2021.

The documentary Matthew Kennedy: One Man's Journey on the life of former Fisk Jubilee Singers director Matthew Kennedy premiered at the Nashville Film Festival in 2007. The Fisk Jubilee Singers performed at the world premiere.

On 15 May 2010 BBC Radio 4 broadcast a play The Jubilee Singers about the Fisk Jubilee Singers' European Tour of 1873 by Adrian Mitchell. (The poet, playwright and human rights campaigner died in 2008.) It portrayed the relationship between the singers and a Welsh journalist who admired them and later acted as their publicist.

From 8 May to 22 May 2010, the radio drama series Adventures in Odyssey released a three-episode saga entitled "The Jubilee Singers". In this saga, Frederick Douglass tells the story of George Leonard White, Benjamin Holmes, Ella Sheppard, Maggie Porter, and others in their struggle to save Fisk University from a financial crisis. It was written by Dave Arnold and directed by Paul McCusker.

In 2013, composer Harvey Brough and lyricist Justin Butcher, wrote "The Year of Jubilee", a piece for soloists and choir telling the story of the Fisk Jubilee Singers. It was first performed at St. Luke's Church, Holloway, London in April 2013 and also with the university of Southampton Voices in May 2014. The latter performance was relevant in that the Fisk Jubilee Singers performed in Southampton 140 years prior to the concert.

In 2016, Tyehimba Jess published a book of poems entitled "Olio" that includes a crown of sonnets which follows the lives of the first troupe of Fisk Jubilee Singers.

In 2018, American country music artist Rodney Atkins released a single titled "Caught Up in the Country" that featured the Fisk Jubilee Singers. It reached the top 20 of the Billboard Hot Country Songs chart in 2019.

"Jubilee", an a cappella musical based on the Jubilee singers written and directed by Tazewell Thompson, had its world premiere at Arena Stage in Washington, D.C., in 2019.

Paul T. Kwami, the director of the Jubilee singers since 1994, died on September 10, 2022.

== Legacy and honors ==
- 1996, the National Arts Club honored the Singers with a Presidential Lifetime Achievement Award.
- 2000, the singers were inducted into the Gospel Music Hall of Fame.
- 2006, the group was honored on the Music City Walk of Fame.
- 2004, the song "Poor Man Lazarus" on the Singers' 2003 recording In Bright Mansions was honored with a Dove Award.
- In Bright Mansions also was nominated for a Grammy Award that year in the Best Recording Package category.
- 2008, the group was awarded the National Medal of Arts.
- 2009, Fisk Jubilee Singers, with Jonny Lang, released the song "I Believe" on the compilation album Oh Happy Day: An All-Star Music Celebration, and received a Grammy nomination for Best Gospel Performance.
- 2021: Their album Celebrating Fisk! The 150th Anniversary Album was nominated for a Grammy Award in the Best Roots Gospel Album category. The album won the Grammy, the first for the Fisk Jubilee Singers.

=== Singers and tours ===
[note: Parentheses indicate performers who participated only a few months in a particular tour.]

First Tour October 1871 to March 1872:

- (Phoebe Anderson) - contralto
- Isaac Dickerson - bass
- Greene Evans - bass
- Benjamin Holmes - tenor
- Jennie Jackson - soprano
- Maggie Porter - soprano
- Thomas Rutling - tenor
- Ella Sheppard - soprano, piano, organ, and guitar
- Minnie Tate - contralto
- Eliza Walker - contralto
- George Wells - performer

Second Tour May 1872 to May 1874:

- Isaac Dickerson - bass
- (Greene Evans) - bass
- Georgia Gordon - soprano
- Benjamin Holmes - tenor
- Jennie Jackson - soprano
- Julia Jackson - contralto
- Mabel Lewis - contralto
- (Josephine Moore) - piano
- (Henry Morgan) - tenor
- Maggie Porter - soprano
- Thomas Rutling - tenor
- Ella Sheppard - soprano, piano, organ, and guitar
- Minnie Tate - contralto
- Edmund Watkins - bass

Third Tour January 1875 to July 1878:

- Hinton D. Alexander- tenor
- (Minnie Butler) - voice and/or instrument unknown
- Maggie Carnes - soprano
- Georgia Gordon - soprano
- (Ella Hildridge) - soprano
- Jennie Jackson - soprano
- Julia Jackson - contralto
- Mabel R. Lewis - contralto
- Frederick J. Loudin - bass
- (Patti Malone) - mezzo-soprano
- (Gabriel Ousley) - bass
- Maggie Porter - soprano
- America W. Robinson - contralto
- Thomas Rutling - tenor
- Ella Sheppard - soprano, piano, organ, and guitar
- Benjamin W. Thomas - bass
- (Lucinda Vance) - contralto
- Edmund W. Watkins - bass

=== Alumni ===
Notable people who were members of the Jubilee Singers include:

- Sadie Chandler Cole (1865–1941), later a music educator and civil rights activist in Los Angeles, and mother of operatic soprano Florence Cole Talbert
- Lemuel L. Foster (1891–1981), bass vocalist and music manager, later worked as a community leader in Harlem, New York City and business executive
- Roland Hayes (1887–1977), lyric tenor who was the first African-American male concert artist to receive wide international acclaim
- L. B. Landry (1878–1934), physician, and community leader in New Orleans
- Frederick J. Loudin (c. 1836–1904), sang bass in the choir. The caliber of his singing was often compared to that of Roland Hayes and Paul Robeson, two of the greatest male vocalists born and bred on American soil. He also directed the "Original Fisk Jubilee Singers", before and after the group disbanded in 1878, touring the globe and receiving international acclaim in the capacity of singer, director and manager of the group for nearly 30 years.
- Orpheus Myron McAdoo (1858−1900) was an African-American singer and minstrel show impresario. He toured extensively in Britain, South Africa and Australia, first with Frederick Loudin's Jubilee Singers and then with his own minstrel companies.
- Matilda Sissieretta Joyner Jones (c. 1868–1933), soprano whose repertoire included grand opera, light opera, and popular music
- Matthew Kennedy, initially one of the singers (tenor), and the group's piano accompanist, and later served as director of the Fisk Jubilee Singers from 1957 (intermittently) until 1986.
- Alice Vassar LaCour (1870s−1924), alto on the 1890-1891 tour; taught at American Missionary Association schools throughout the South
- Patti J. Malone, mezzo-soprano
- Mrs. James A. Myers, contralto, sang with the Fisk Jubilee Singers under John Wesley Work Jr. from 1915, and directed the Jubilee Singers from 1928 to 1947.
- Marguerite Pennybacker (born 1903), social worker in Texas; soloist at the 1928 wedding of Countee Cullen and Yolande Du Bois
- Ella Sheppard, one of the original members of the Jubilee singers who served as a leader and director of the group. She was a trusted confidante and friend of Booker T. Washington and Frederick Douglass.
- Aldena Windham Davis Smith, later music director at Virginia Union University, and Virginia state education official
- Robert Bradford Williams, the first African-American mayor in Aotearoa.

=== In popular culture ===
The Fisk Jubilee Singers with Adrienne Warren as the lead singer were portrayed in the fourth season of the HBO historical drama television series The Gilded Age.

== Discography ==
The Fisk Jubilee Singers have produced vast numbers of recordings over their 150-year history. For example, the Discography of American Historical Recordings lists 82 master recordings just from the period 1909 – 1927, made for four major early record companies (Victor, Columbia, OKeh, and Edison). The group's releases since then include:

- I Want to Be Ready (2021)
- Celebrating Fisk: the 150th Anniversary Album (2020), which was awarded "Best Roots Gospel Album" at the 63rd Grammy Awards in 2021.
- Roll Jordan Roll (2015)
- Fisk Jubilee Singers (2011)
- Gospel Music Hall of Fame Series – The Fisk Jubilee Singers (2009), a remastered collection of recordings from the early 1980s
- Sacred Journey (2007)
- The Fisk Jubilee Singers: Singing Our Song (2007), produced by the Tennessee Arts Commission
- In Bright Mansions (2003)
- Fisk Jubilee Singers Vol. 3 (1924-1940) (1997)
- Fisk Jubilee Singers Vol. 2 (1915-1920) (1997)
- Fisk Jubilee Singers Vol. 1 (1909-1911) (1997)
- Spirituals (1958)
- The Gold and Blue Album (1955)
