= Ella Sheppard =

American singer

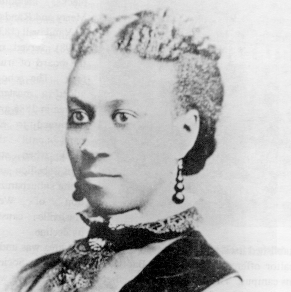
Ella Sheppard, singer, pianist, arranger of spirituals, and matriarch of the original Fisk Jubilee Singers

Ella Sheppard (February 4, 1851 – June 9, 1914) was an American soprano, pianist, composer, and arranger of spirituals. She was the matriarch of the original Fisk Jubilee Singers of Nashville, Tennessee. She also played the organ and the guitar. Sheppard was a friend and confidante of African-American activists and orators Booker T. Washington and Frederick Douglass.

== Early life and education ==
Samuella "Ella" Sheppard was born in Nashville, Tennessee, on or near former President Andrew Jackson's plantation called The Hermitage. Ella's father, Simon, was the son of a white planter named James Glover Sheppard and one of James's female slaves. When Simon's white half-brother, Benjamin Harper Sheppard, married Andrew Jackson's grandniece by marriage, Phereby Donelson, the two households combined and moved onto the estate owned by Phereby's father, Lemuel Donelson. Benjamin allowed Simon to hire himself out as a Nashville liveryman and hack driver. For several years, Simon hired himself out as a liveryman at The Hermitage, where he worked with a freedman named William Napier and with "Uncle Alfred" Jackson, the head coachman for Andrew Jackson. Hiring himself out enabled Simon to earn $1,800, with which he paid for his own freedom. Ella's mother, Sarah Hannah Sheppard, was a slave from the Donelson household. She had grown up a slave playmate of Benjamin and Phereby's children and grew into a valued domestic servant who served as head nurse and housekeeper. In approximately 1844, Sarah and Simon were wed. Simon began saving $1,300 to purchase Sarah's freedom based upon a promise that he would be able to do so. Sarah gave birth to Ella in February of 1851. As Benjamin and Phereby Sheppard prepared to move to a plantation in Okolona, Mississippi, Sarah overheard Phereby confess to Benjamin that she had only pretended to agree that Simon could purchase Sarah's freedom so as not to prolong Sarah's grief at their upcoming separation. Benjamin implored his wife to allow Simon to follow through with the promise, but Phereby was adamant: "Sarah shall never belong to Simon. She is mine and she shall die mine. Let Simon get another wife." Fed-up with slave life, Sarah threatened that she'd rather "...take Ella and jump into the river than see her a slave." Legend says that Ella's mother took her to the riverbank to carry out the threat, but an elderly slave woman prevented her, saying, "Don’t do it, Honey! Don’t you see God’s chariot a-comin’ down from Heaven? Let the chariot of the Lord swing low. This child is gonna stand before kings and queens! The Lord would have need of that child." Sarah took the woman's advice, walked back up the hill to slavery with Ella in her arms. Fearing the loss of the child, the slave mistress allowed Simon Sheppard to purchase his own daughter for $350. When Ella was three, Sarah was sold to a plantation in Mississippi, a state that slaves practically never returned from. Ella stayed with her father in Nashville. He later married another enslaved woman for whom he paid $1,300 to free her.

Following an 1856 Nashville race riot, whites tightened controls on free Negroes in the area. As a result, Simon was unable to work and soon found himself in debt. Fearful of the potential seizure of his family (as assets to be sold into slavery), he fled to Cincinnati, Ohio. Ella showed exceptional musical talent. To support this talent, her father purchased a piano for his daughter, and paid a German woman to give her private music lessons. Young Ella attended a colored school in Cincinnati, and also studied with a white American teacher who gave lessons on the condition she keep it a secret. The teacher taught Ella late at night and made her sneak in through the back entrance to his school since she was his only black student. After her father's death from cholera in 1866, Ella supported herself, her stepmother and half-sister by playing for local functions, working as a maid, and teaching music in Gallatin, Tennessee.

After about five months she was only able to save a little more than $6, because the poor black pupils were not always able to pay for their lessons. She took that $6, packed her belongings in a "pie box"-sized trunk, and enrolled at the Fisk Free Colored School in Nashville, Tennessee in 1868, where her $6 lasted three weeks. She had planned to leave after her money ran out, but was able to convince other students to take music lessons from her, and found additional work in the campus dining room and as a dishwasher in order to stay in school.

== Career ==
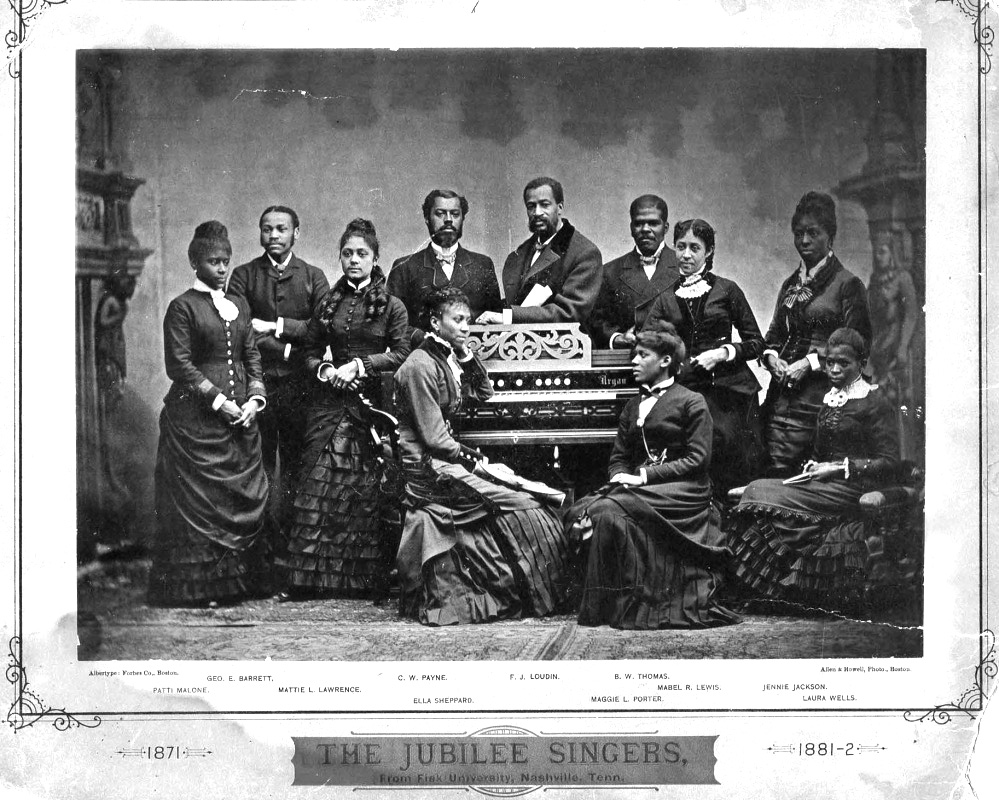
Fisk Jubilee Singers 1882

=== Fisk Jubilee Singers in the U.S. ===
Sheppard paid for two years of studies by teaching music in Nashville, including as a summer assistant music teacher for Fisk. She was the sole black member of the faculty at Fisk prior to 1875.

Fisk was struggling financially at this time, needing better buildings, dining resources, and supplies for their students–worse, the American Missionary Association was considering closing the school. When Fisk's treasurer, George L. White, overheard some of the students singing the original old "plantation songs," which were not meant to be heard in public, he was so moved by these haunting melodies that he decided to have them arranged for concert performance, in European-style four-part harmony. Sheppard did most of the arranging of these works. The first tours were successful, and the Fisk Jubilee Singers were formed in 1871 to go on a national tour. Sheppard worked as the primary vocal coach and director for the group, collecting over one hundred songs for their repertoire. She sang soprano, accompanied the choir on piano, organ, and guitar, but also oversaw rehearsals and conducted during performances.

They sang for Mark Twain, President Ulysses S. Grant, congressmen, diplomats, and royalty. "These singers," according to one newspaper, "are doing a great work for humanity." The first tours were immensely financially and critically successful, with one tour of Ohio churches raising $50,000 that they donated for relief after the Great Chicago Fire. They performed all this under the racial discrimination of the towns they toured, facing hostility during performances and hazardous travel. Some incidents were documented of the singers moving hostile audience members to tears.

=== Later tours ===
Sheppard was with the Jubilee Singers for both tours of Europe, including performances for the British, Dutch and German monarchs. They earned $120,000 from their first tour, which Fisk used to construct Jubilee Hall, named in their honor and one of the largest buildings in Nashville. Queen Victoria stated when she heard the group while Ella Sheppard served as their matriarch, "[The Fisk Jubilee Singers] sing so beautifully they must be from the Music City of the United States." Sheppard wrote that the British were "so stupid or ignorant" about black people and Americans, but appreciated the praise of a reverend in Berlin and the enthusiasm of the Crown Prince in Pottsdam.

The Jubilee Singers's popularity resulted in a push to publish transcriptions of their songs. White musician Theodore Seward prepared the first set of written songs as an outsider to spiritual traditions and the Jubilee Singers, hence the songs had many mistakes written in. Seward became assistant director to the Singers in 1874 and asked Sheppard to help him publish their songs again: Sheppard wrote in her diary that she transcribed “We'll Overtake the Army,” “Wait a Little While,” “Don't You Grieve after Me,” “The Angels Changed My Name,” “He Rose from the Dead,” “Stand Still,” “Move Along,” and “A Happy New Year" in the summer of 1875. Sheppard received no acknowledgement for her work when these songs were added to the 1875 collection of Jubilee Singers songs by J.B.T. Marsh.

Towards the end of the second European tour, George White resigned and returned home, leaving Sheppard full control over the group. The Jubilee Singers later disbanded in July 1878 because of their grueling touring schedule and dwindling profits due to economic recessions in Europe. Ella Sheppard was quoted as saying, "Our strength was failing under the ill treatment at hotels, on railroads, poorly attended concerts, and ridicule." However, back in America in 1879, White reorganized the group independently of Fisk, with Sheppard returning as well. The Jubilee Singers had a newly political role when they advocated for the Civil Rights Act of 1875 and politicians like the soon-to-be President James Garfield.

=== Reconstruction of the Fisk Jubilee Singers ===
Sheppard left the independent group in 1882 when she got married, but she continued to organize jubilee choirs between work she did for the American Missionary Association. She later rebuilt Fisk's Jubilee Singers in 1890, sending them on a 6-month tour of the North. In 1897, on July 5th & 6th, they performed in Charlottetown at Market Hall with the price of admission being .25 and .35 cents. She coached them for years, and they again performed for a prince in 1902. Modern scholars have identified her as unjustly overlooked for decades, both for her shaping of the initial Jubilee Singers, and because during the 1890s she was the director of the group in practice but not title. The independent Jubilee Singers had to disband again as violence against African-Americans grew in the South and it was deemed unsafe for women to travel. A male quartet called the Fisk Jubilee Quartet was formed to carry on the tradition of those Spirituals in concert form.

== Personal life ==
After Sheppard's mother was sold to a plantation in Mississippi when Sheppard was three, Sheppard did not see her again until she was 15, when she found her along with a sister who had been sold. Sheppard wrote that her mother's heart was broken by slavery and the forced splitting of their family; she recorded that her mother often said, "My back was never struck, but my heart is like a checkerboard with its stripes of sorrow."

Sheppard was wed to George Washington Moore, a Fisk graduate, in 1882. He was a prominent minister known for his contributions to the American Missionary Association. They lived in D.C. while he was pastor of Lincoln Memorial Church, and she traveled with him throughout the South, helping the AMA. When they returned to Nashville in 1890, she brought her mother, sister, and stepmother to live with them on the Fisk campus at a house that became known as the "Moore House".

George Sheppard Moore, a doctor, was one of their sons and Clinton the other.

Sheppard died in Nashville, Tennessee on June 9th, 1914 at the age of 63 and her funeral was held at Fisk Memorial Chapel.

== Legacy ==
Sheppard played a significant role in shaping the Jubliee Singers and spreading the Spiritual genre across the world. Musicologist and later director of the Jubilee Singers, John Wesley Work Jr, wrote of her in his book, Folk Song of the American Negro:

Mrs. Ella Sheppard Moore might properly be called a "folk song of the American Negro." She has been so closely connected with the presentation of them to the world, so intimately associated with their preservation that it is impossible to think of the one separate and apart from the other.

On November 17, 2009, the Ella Sheppard School of Music was founded by Chicago Native and former Fisk Jubilee Singer George Cooper — who studied piano with Matthew Kennedy, director of the Fisk Jubilee Singers from 1957 to 1986 — with the blessing of Ella Sheppard's great granddaughter Beth Howse. Since its inception, the school has provided free musical instruction to hundreds of children ages 2–14 on Chicago's West Side.
