= Adelphi School =

Historic school in Pennsylvania, U.S.

- U.S. National Register of Historic Places
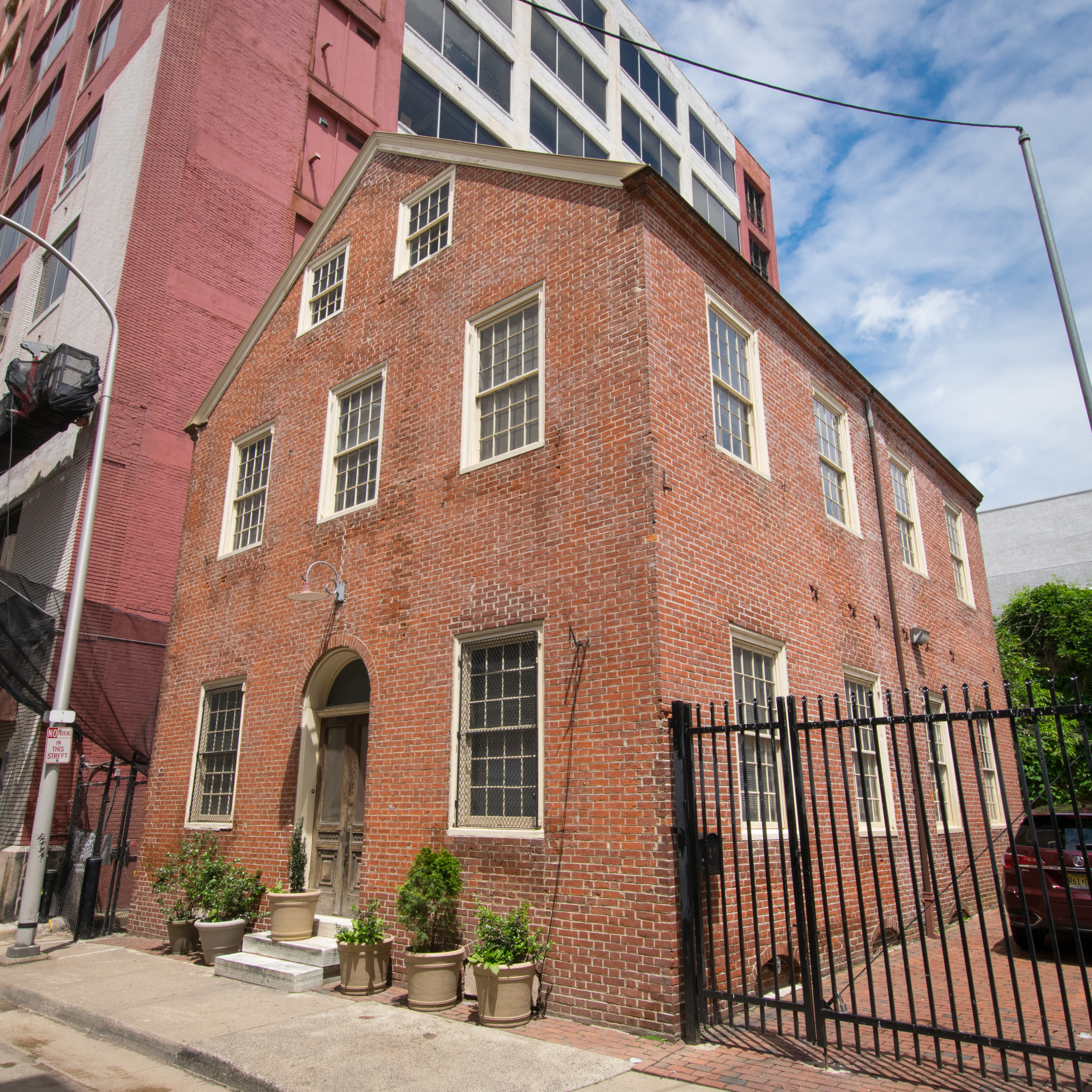

- Location within Philadelphia Location within Pennsylvania Location within the United States
- Location: 1223–1225 Spring St., Philadelphia, Pennsylvania
- Coordinates: 39°57′23″N 75°9′36″W
- Area: 0.5 acres (0.20 ha)
- Built: 1831
- Architectural style: Federal
- NRHP reference No.: 78002441
- Added to NRHP: September 18, 1978

The Adelphi School was a Quaker-organized school for poor children that operated between 1808 and 1906 in what is now the Chinatown neighborhood of Philadelphia's Center City. Originally founded to educate white boys during its first several years, it shifted focus to educating black children after the public education system was established in Pennsylvania. The Adelphi School was sustained through charitable donations, at no cost to its students. The building that housed the school beginning in 1832 is thought to be Philadelphia's "last surviving example of a free school building". It was listed on the National Register of Historic Places in 1978.

== History ==
In 1807, members of the Philadelphia Quaker community, under the leadership of the minister Thomas Scattergood, founded the Philadelphia Association of Friends for the Instruction of Poor Children to address the educational needs of indigent children in the city. This organization was to consist of no more than forty-five members, all of whom were required to be members of the Society of Friends (i.e., Quakers). The Association intended to build one or more schools based on the Monitorial System of instruction recently developed by Andrew Bell and Joseph Lancaster. This effort was part of a broader movement within the Quaker community to establish charity schools for the poor prior to the establishment of taxpayer-funded public schools in the United States.

The Association obtained funding through private donations and established its first school, for white boys, in 1808. After the first few weeks, the number of students had reached about 90. To accommodate the school's rapid growth, the Association raised $7000 to construct a new building on Pegg Street in the Northern Liberties. In 1809 the school moved into the new facility and began operating under the name "the Adelphi School". In 1812 the school began instructing girls as well, and they made up about a third of the student population of 330 that year. The school reached its peak enrollment in 1814 with 582 pupils.

In 1818, Philadelphia established a public school system, initially for white children only, under the direction of the reformer Roberts Vaux, who had been influenced by the Adelphi School. It was one of the earliest municipal public school systems in the United States. The Association of Friends, believing that the problem of educating poor white children was now being adequately addressed in Philadelphia, closed the Adelphi School that year. The Pegg Street schoolhouse was then rented to the public school system until 1825. The Association thereafter turned its attention to the problem of educating black children in the city, and established a new school on Gaskill Street in 1822.

In 1825, the Adelphi School began renting space in a schoolhouse belonging to the Pennsylvania Abolition Society on Cherry Street. In 1831, the Abolition Society decided to reoccupy the space, and the Adelphi School moved to a temporary space while a new dedicated schoolhouse was constructed on Wager Street, now called Spring Street. The 30 by 40 foot, two and a half story brick structure was built for $3100 on a lot purchased for $1200, and the school was opened in 1832. It was constructed in the Federal style, with a simplicity of form characteristic of Quaker architecture.

The Wager Street Adelphi School opened in 1832 when the first floor was completed, and the whole structure was finished in 1834. The school originally accepted only school-aged black boys, but expanded to include younger children of both sexes in 1835. In 1838, instruction for the older boys was discontinued in favor of admitting girls. The Adelphi School operated at this location over the next several decades. W. E. B. Du Bois, in his 1899 study The Philadelphia Negro, records its enrollment count at 166 pupils for the year 1847. This had declined to an average of 67 for the period 1873 to 1881. Despite the expansion of the public education system, supporters of the Association believed that the free school still served an important purpose in reaching students who for whatever reason could not attend the public schools.

The Association of Friends continued operating the schoolhouse until 1906. From 1908 to 1945, the Abolition Society owned the building. It was used for group activities such as the Boy Scouts and sewing clubs, as well as more formal educational programs. This school operated with the goal of improving "the moral, social, industrial and domestic conditions" of the African American population of Philadelphia. In 1978, the building was added to the National Register of Historic Places, in recognition of its architectural, educational, religious, and humanitarian significance. By that point, it was under private ownership and used for commercial purposes.
