= Jubilee Hall (Fisk University) =

- Jubilee Hall, Fisk University
- U.S. National Register of Historic Places
- U.S. National Historic Landmark
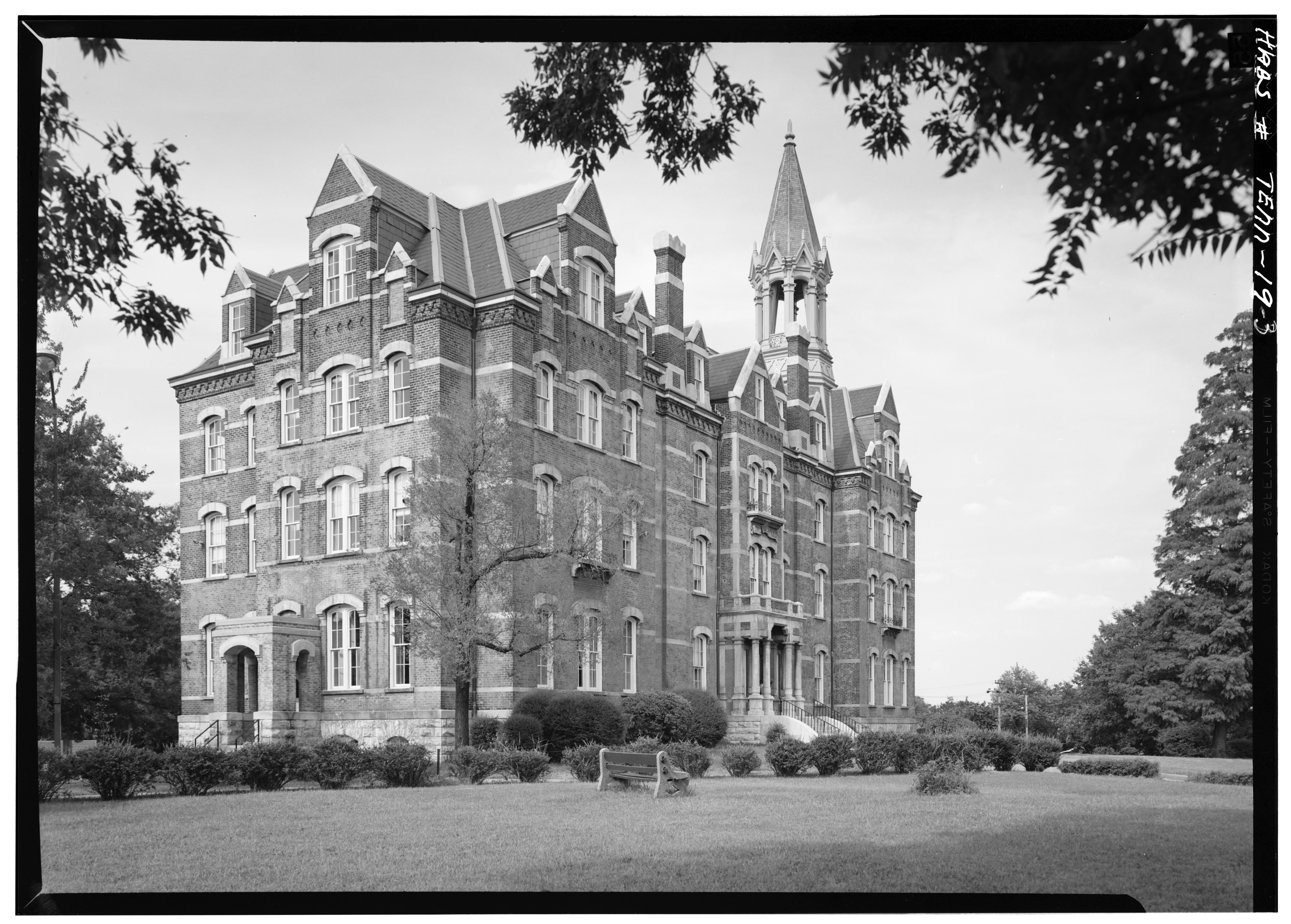
- Jubilee Hall (1970)

- Location within Tennessee Location within the United States
- Location: 17th Ave., N., Nashville, Tennessee
- Coordinates: 36°10′8″N 86°48′17″W
- Built: 1876
- Architect: Stephen D. Hatch
- Architectural style: Gothic
- NRHP reference No.: 71000817

Significant dates
- Added to NRHP: December 9, 1971
- Designated NHL: December 2, 1974

Jubilee Hall is the oldest academic building on the campus of Fisk University in Nashville, Tennessee, United States. Completed in 1876, it was the university's first permanent building, and is a good local example of Gothic Revival architecture. It was designated a National Historic Landmark in 1974, in recognition of the university's place as one of the first historically black colleges and universities to be established after the American Civil War. It presently serves as an undergraduate residence hall. In 2017 the Tennessee Historical Commission installed a marker honoring the Fisk Jubilee Singers, whose 1870s European tour raised the funds to pay for the building's construction.

== Description and history ==
Jubilee Hall is located on the Northern side of the Fisk University Campus, on a loop drive at the Northern end of 17th Avenue North at Meharry Boulevard. It is a large L-shaped masonry building, six stories in height, with a hip roof adorned with gabled dormers and projections. Its main facade is divided into a central section and slightly projecting end sections, with a tower rising at the junction of the center and right sections. The tower rises to an open octagonal belfry and steeple, all adorned with Gothic spires. Windows are generally set in segmented-arch openings, either singly or pairwise, with arched stone lintels. The main roof cornice has decorative brick corbelling.

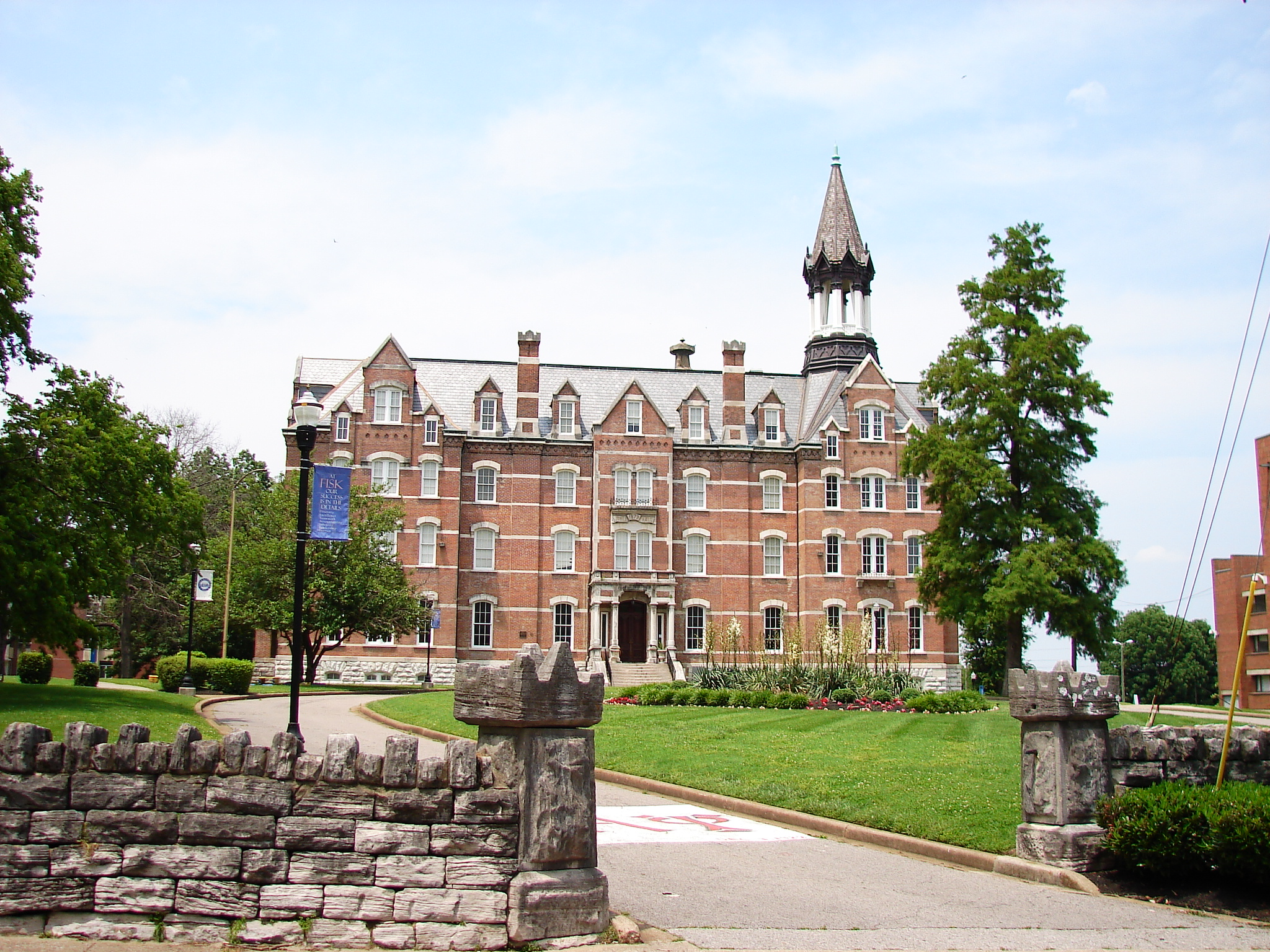
Jubilee Hall (2008)

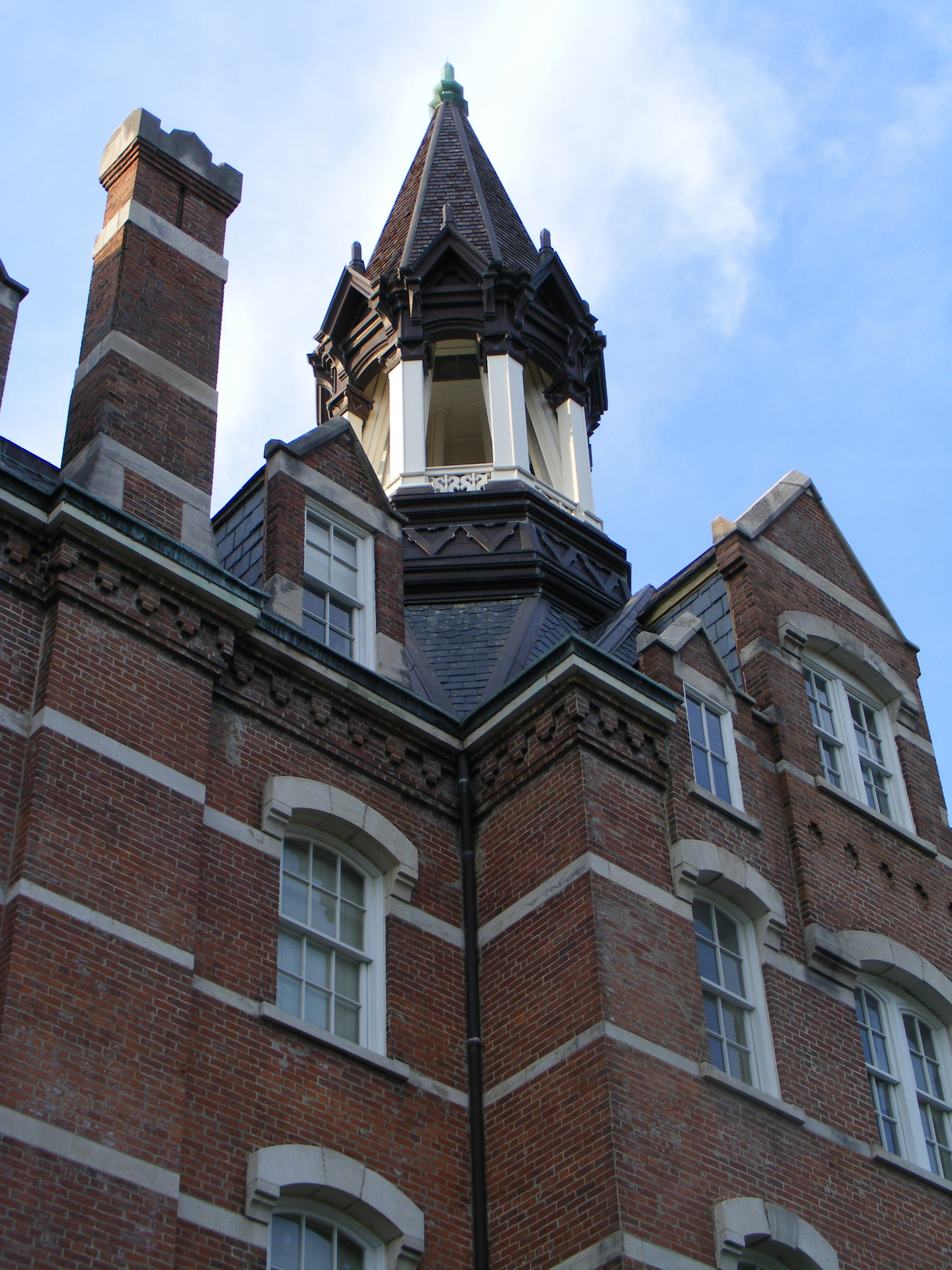
Jubilee Hall, Cose Up

Fisk University was founded in 1865 through the efforts of the antislavery American Missionary Association, and was named for Clinton B. Fisk. The school was qualitatively different from other schools, in that it was designed from the outset to provide a full liberal arts education to its African-American students. In 1871, the financially troubled school raised funds to build Jubilee Hall by sending the Fisk Jubilee Singers in their first Europe singing tour in 1873. Jubilee Hall was built in 1873-76 with proceeds from the tour. It was designed by New York architect Stephen D. Hatch.

Although its exterior is little changed, the interior has been completely modernized to provide dormitory facilities. It also houses a floor-to-ceiling portrait of the original Jubilee Singers that was given to the university by Queen Victoria during the 1873 tour.

== See also ==
Media related to Jubilee Hall at Wikimedia Commons

- List of National Historic Landmarks in Tennessee
- National Register of Historic Places listings in Davidson County, Tennessee
