= Maggie Porter =

American singer (1853–1942)

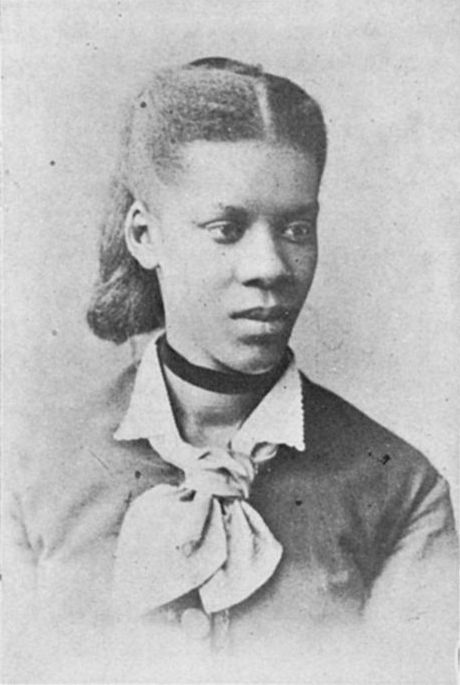
Maggie Porter

Maggie Porter Cole (1853–1942) was an American singer and first-generation-freed slave, most notable as an original member of the Fisk Jubilee Singers, one of only four members to participate in all three of the original tours by the group. She was known for her vocal talents as a soprano and also worked as a schoolteacher.

== Early life ==
Maggie Porter was one of three daughters born in Lebanon, Tennessee to a slave family belonging to Henry Frazier. At the start of the Civil War, Frazier moved to Nashville, taking Maggie's family with him, and when Union soldiers took and occupied the city, Frazier freed Maggie and her family after the publication of the Emancipation Proclamation. After she attended the Fisk Free Colored School, Maggie worked as a teacher in various country schools (one of which was burned down by the KKK). In the winter of 1870, Maggie was asked to sing the title role in Handel's "Cantata of Esther" by George White, a musical and choral director at Fisk. Her success in the role led to her being offered a position with the new Fisk Jubilee Singers.

== With the Jubilee Singers and later life ==
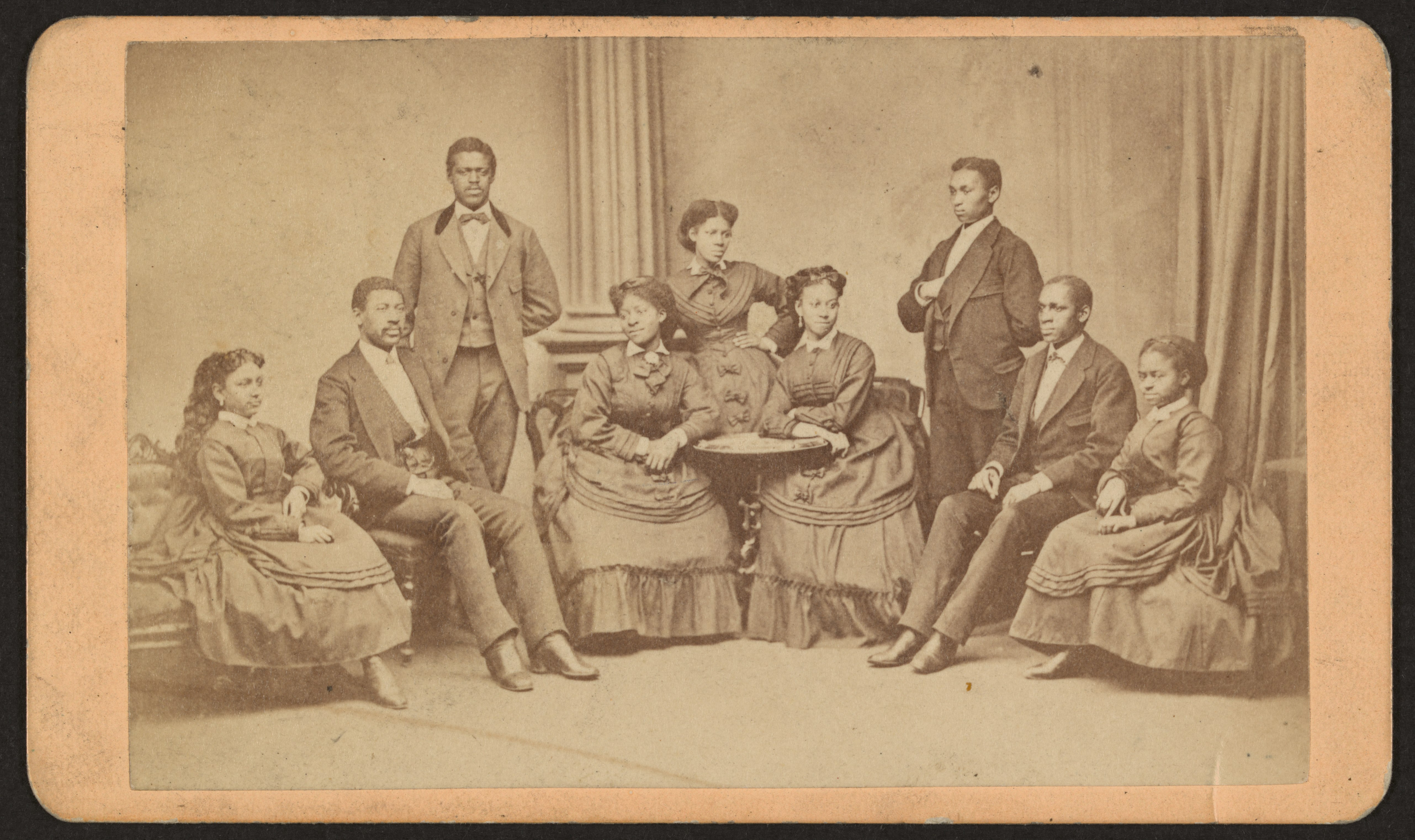
Jubilee Singers, Fisk University, Nashville, Tenn. Porter is standing in the center in this grouping

Porter traveled with the Jubilee Singers through all three of their original tours from 1871 to 1878 (with one exception). She sang lead soprano, and had a reputation as a diva. As a result, Porter was banished from the group for three months during their initial tour in 1871. After finishing the tours, she spent some time living out of the country in Germany before returning to the U.S. to participate in the "reorganized Fisk Jubilee Singers", which contained alumni of the original group but had no affiliation with Fisk. Later, she and her husband formed a new group (also called the Fisk Jubilee Singers) with a few alumni from the original Fisk Singers, and they toured the U.S., Canada, and Europe through the 1880s into the 1890s. She and her husband later moved to Detroit where they raised their family and continued to remain involved with local music. She returned to Fisk for the 60th anniversary celebration of the founding of the Fisk Jubilee Singers.

Maggie Porter died of natural causes at age 89 in 1942.
