= Athens High School (Alabama) =

High school in Athens, Alabama, United States

Location
- 655 US Highway 31 North; Athens, Alabama 35611; United States
- 34°48′50″N 86°57′00″W

Information
- Type: Comprehensive Public High School
- Established: 1973 (53 years ago)
- School district: Athens City School System
- Superintendent: Beth Patton
- CEEB code: 010175
- Principal: Willie Moore
- Staff: 69.80 (FTE)
- Grades: 9 to 12
- Gender: Co-education
- Enrollment: 1,228 (2023–2024)
- Student to teacher ratio: 17.59
- Campus type: Suburban
- Colors: Black and gold
- Mascot: Golden Eagle
- Feeder schools: Athens Middle School
- Website: ahs.acs-k12.org

Athens High School is the only high school in the Athens City Schools System.

== Sports ==
=== Cheerleading ===
The Athens High School cheerleading program in Athens, Alabama supports school athletic teams and participates in competitive cheerleading. The program includes multiple squads, such as varsity and junior varsity, which perform at football and basketball games, pep rallies, and community events.

Athens cheerleaders compete at regional, state, and national-level competitions. The program has achieved significant success at the national level, winning national championships in 2023, 2024, and 2025. In addition, Athens cheerleading teams have earned world championship titles in 2023 and 2026.

Competitive routines performed by the team incorporate advanced stunting, tumbling, jumps, and dance, and are judged on execution, difficulty, synchronization, and overall performance. The program emphasizes school spirit, teamwork, discipline, and athletic development, and contributes to the school’s extracurricular and athletic culture.

=== Soccer ===
The Lady Golden Eagles have gone to the final four five years in a row and went on to win second in the state in 2012. They also won the 2013 tournament.

=== Football ===
The school won the 2006 state championship, the third in the school's history after 1975 and 1976)

School aluminas Philip Rivers was a successful quarterback for the Chargers and Colts of the National Football League. He has the most passing yards for any quarterback who never reached a Super Bowl.

=== Softball ===
In 2005, the Lady Eagles won area competition and went on to the state championship where they took home third place in 5A play. In 2010, the Golden Eagles won the state championship, scoring two upsets over top-ranked Mortimer Jordan High School in the finals.

2022 State Champs in class 6A defeating Helena in the finals. 2023 State runners-up in 6A losing to Wetumpka in the finals. 2024 State Champs in 6A defeating Hartselle in the finals.

=== Basketball ===
Keith Askins is a retired NBA basketball player who played for the Miami Heat. Also, more recently, Richard Hendrix was an NBA power forward for the Golden State Warriors from Athens High. He currently plays overseas in Europe.

=== Swimming ===
At the 2013 Alabama High School Athletic Association Swimming and Diving Championships, the Women's 200 yard Freestyle relay finished 1st with a time of 1:38.50, breaking Bob Jones High School's 2007 state record in the event.

=== Wrestling ===
The wrestling team has won seven state titles; between 1988 and 1998 they won six total under Coach Qualls. In 2025 Athens captured another team state title, under coach Andrew Campbell.

=== Band ===
In 2010, The AHS Golden Eagle marching band won state in the Pride of Hayden Marching Festival. Also, they won all trophies in their second competition and 8th in their third at Jacksonville State University. They have a drumline consisting of 5 basses, 3 snares, 2 tenors, and a front ensemble. The drumline also had an indoor drumline in 2011 consisting of 4 basses, 2 snares, 2 tenors, and a pit. The band also has an auxiliary section, including color guard and majorettes.

=== JROTC ===
Founded in the mid-1970s, Athens High School is the only school in Limestone County to have a Junior ROTC program. They have a Saber Honor Guard, Rifle Team, Drill Team, and Raider Team. .

== Notable alumni ==
- Mike Anderson, musician who goes by the name Anderson East
- Keith Askins, former NBA basketball player for the Miami Heat
- Don Black (white supremacist), attended before transferring his senior year
- Tom Calvin, former NFL halfback
- Dick Coffman, former MLB player for the Washington Senators, St. Louis Browns, New York Giants, Boston Bees, and Philadelphia Phillies
- Slick Coffman, former MLB player for the Detroit Tigers and Saint Louis Browns
- Anderson East, musician
- Rob Ezell, college football coach
- Richard Hendrix, former NBA power forward for the Golden State Warriors
- Alfred McCullough, former American football player
- Philip Rivers, former NFL quarterback for the Los Angeles Chargers (2004–2019) and Indianapolis Colts (2020, 2025)
- Lee Vickers, former NFL tight end for the Pittsburgh Steelers (2006), Philadelphia Eagles (2006), Baltimore Ravens (2007) Pittsburgh Steelers (2008), New York Giants (2009), and Washington Redskins (2010–2012)
- Quez Watkins, former NFL wide receiver for the Philadelphia Eagles
