= Athens City Schools =

Athens City Schools may refer to:

- Athens City Schools (Alabama)
- Athens City Schools (Tennessee)
