= Elna Spaulding =

American civic leader

Member of the Durham County Board of Commissioners
- In office 1974–1984

Personal details
- Born: Elna Virginia Bridgeforth; January 23, 1909; Tuskegee, Alabama, U.S.
- Died: January 7, 2007 (aged 97); Durham, North Carolina, U.S.
- Political party: Democratic
- Spouse: Asa T. Spaulding (m. 1933; died 1990)
- Children: 4, including Kenneth
- Parents: George Ruffin Bridgeforth; Datie Miller
- Education: Talladega College (MusB)

Elna Virginia Bridgeforth Spaulding (née Bridgeforth; January 23, 1909 – January 7, 2007) was an American civic leader and politician. She served on the Board of Commissioners for Durham County from 1974 to 1984, the first African American woman to do so.

== Early life and education ==
Elna Virginia Bridgeforth was born on January 23, 1909, at Tuskegee Institute in Tuskegee, Alabama. She was the daughter of George Ruffin Bridgeforth, a dairy farmer on the faculty of Tuskegee, and Datie Bridgeforth (née Miller). Bridgeforth attended Trinity High School in Athens, Alabama, graduating in 1926, and earned the Bachelor of Music degree from Talladega College in 1930.

After graduating from Talladega, Bridgeforth moved to Durham, North Carolina in 1930 to teach music in Durham's public schools. She taught for a year before she became the head of the music department at Winston-Salem Teachers College from 1931 to 1933. Bridgeforth married Asa T. Spaulding Sr. in 1933.

== Women-in-Action for the Prevention of Violence and its Causes ==
In September 1968, Spaulding founded Women-in-Action for the Prevention of Violence and its Causes, a nonprofit, inter-racial organization in Durham. She served as the organization's first president until 1974, when she ran for the Durham County Board of Commissioners. The organization worked to ease racial tensions in the community and its work led to court-ordered school integration in 1970.

In 1991, Women-in-Action established the annual Elna B. Spaulding Founder's Award. The award's second recipient was Spaulding's fellow Durham county commissioner Josephine Dobbs Clement.

== Durham County Board of Commissioners ==
Spaulding was first elected to the Durham County Board of Commissioners in 1974. Spaulding received the most votes out of the five Democrats and four Republicans in the race; the top five vote getters were elected to the board. She was the first African American woman elected to the board. Spaulding was re-elected for four additional two-year terms to the Board of Commissioners, serving until her retirement in 1984.

Duke University honored Spaulding with the William C. Friday Award in Moral Leadership in 2001.

== Personal life and legacy ==
Elna Bridgeforth and Asa T. Spaulding were married on June 24, 1933. They had four children: Asa T. Jr., Patricia Ann, Aaron Lowery, and Kenneth Bridgeforth. Asa Spaulding Sr. died in 1990. She died on January 7, 2007, in Durham, at the age of 97. One of her grandchildren is blogger, columnist, and activist Pam Spaulding. The Elna B. Spaulding Conflict Resolution Center in Durham is named for her.
