= Mary Fletcher =

Mary Fletcher may refer to:

- Mary Fletcher (preacher) (1739–1815), English preacher
- Mary Fletcher (philanthropist) (1830–1885), American philanthropist and hospital founder

== See also ==
- Mary Fletcher Wells (died 1893), American educator
