= Trinity School (Athens, Alabama) =

School in Alabama, US (1865–1970)

Coordinates: 34.7976°N 86.9803°W

- Athens, Alabama; Limestone County; United States

Information
- School type: Private
- Founded: 1865
- Founder: Mary Fletcher Wells
- Closed: 1970
- Affiliation: American Missionary Association, Western Freedmen’s Aid Commission

Trinity School (1865–1970) was a private secondary school for African American students in Athens, Alabama, United States.

== History ==
It was founded by Mary Fletcher Wells in 1865. The school was sponsored by the Western Freedmen’s Aid Commission and the American Missionary Association, located in a Baptist church initially. It was the only high school for Black students in the county and the first school in the northern half of the state offering kindergarten for Black children, during the time of Jim Crow laws. Wells initially taught under the protection of armed guards. The school had an integrated faculty by 1892. Wells would teach, canning fruits and vegetables for the winter, and returned north to raise funds for the school in the summers. She remained at the school for twenty-seven years.

In 1907, it was relocated to Fort Henderson where a new school building was built on the ruins of Fort Henderson, and succeeded a wooden school building on the site.

In 1950, the school was transferred from the American Missionary Association to the state of Alabama. Additional school property followed six years later. Trinity was closed in 1970, after court-ordered desegregation.

== Legacy ==
A historical marker by the cistern that served the 1865–1907 school building commemorates the school's history. A historical marker is also located at the Fort Henderson site. There have been efforts to preserve and restore what remains of the school sites and buildings.

== Alumni ==
- Patti J. Malone, mezzo-soprano vocalist
- C. Eric Lincoln, novelist
- George Ruffin Bridgeforth, professor and agriculture department head at Tuskegee Institute
