= Billy Davis (Arizona politician) =

American politician (1945-)

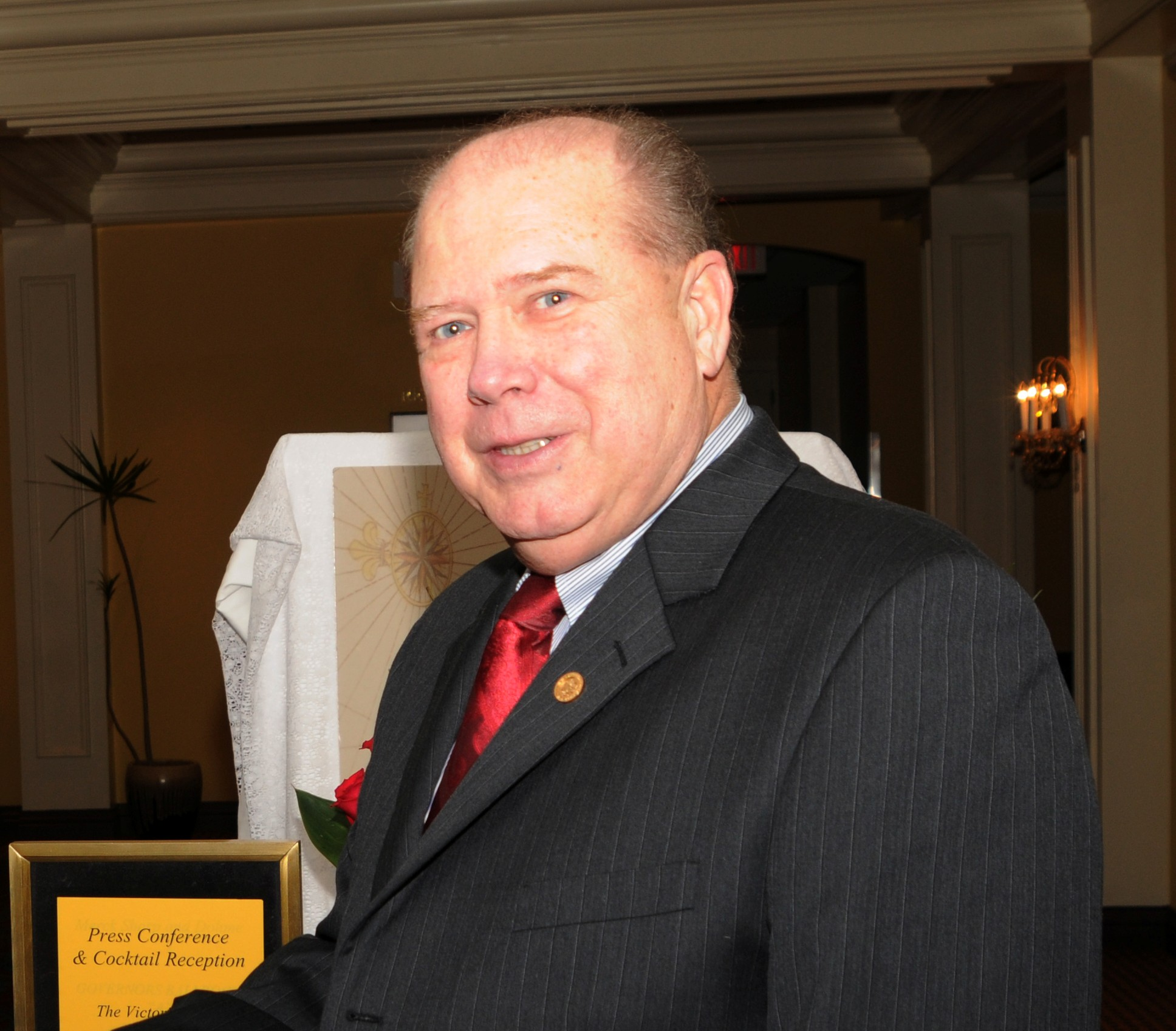

Member of the Arizona Senate from the 19th district
- In office January 3, 1983 – January 6, 1987

Committees Served
- In office January 3, 1983 – January 6, 1987
- Vice Chairman Government Education Judiciary Rules: Billy Davis

Personal details
- Born: Billy Wayne Davis; May 7, 1945 (age 81) Athens, Alabama
- Party: Republican
- Spouse: Billie J. Davis (1963–present)
- Children: Todd, Robyn and Jason
- Education: University of Tennessee; University of South Carolina; Hyles Anderson College
- Website: Official website

Military service
- Allegiance: United States of America
- Branch/service: United States Navy Honorable Discharge; 3rd June 1969
- Years of service: 1963 – 1969; Fallon, Nevada (1963–1964); Flight Training Exercises; Naval Air Station Chase Field, Beeville, Texas (1964–1965); Air Station Training; USS Kitty Hawk (CV-63), (1965–1967); Aircraft Carrier Training
- Battles/wars: Vietnam Two Tours
- Awards: • The Vietnam Service Medal, with two Bronze Stars • National Defense Service Medal • The Vietnam Campaign Medal, with Device (1960–) • The Navy Unit Commendation Ribbon • Letters of Commendations

Billy Wayne Davis, sometimes known as Bill Davis, is a land developer and former state senator for the Arizona Senate in the United States.

== Early life ==
Billy Davis was born in Athens, Alabama, on May 7, 1945.

He is of Welsh, English, Irish, and Cherokee descent on his father's side and his mother's ancestors were from Switzerland.

Billy grew up and went to school in Chattanooga, Tennessee.

His father died when he was eleven years old.

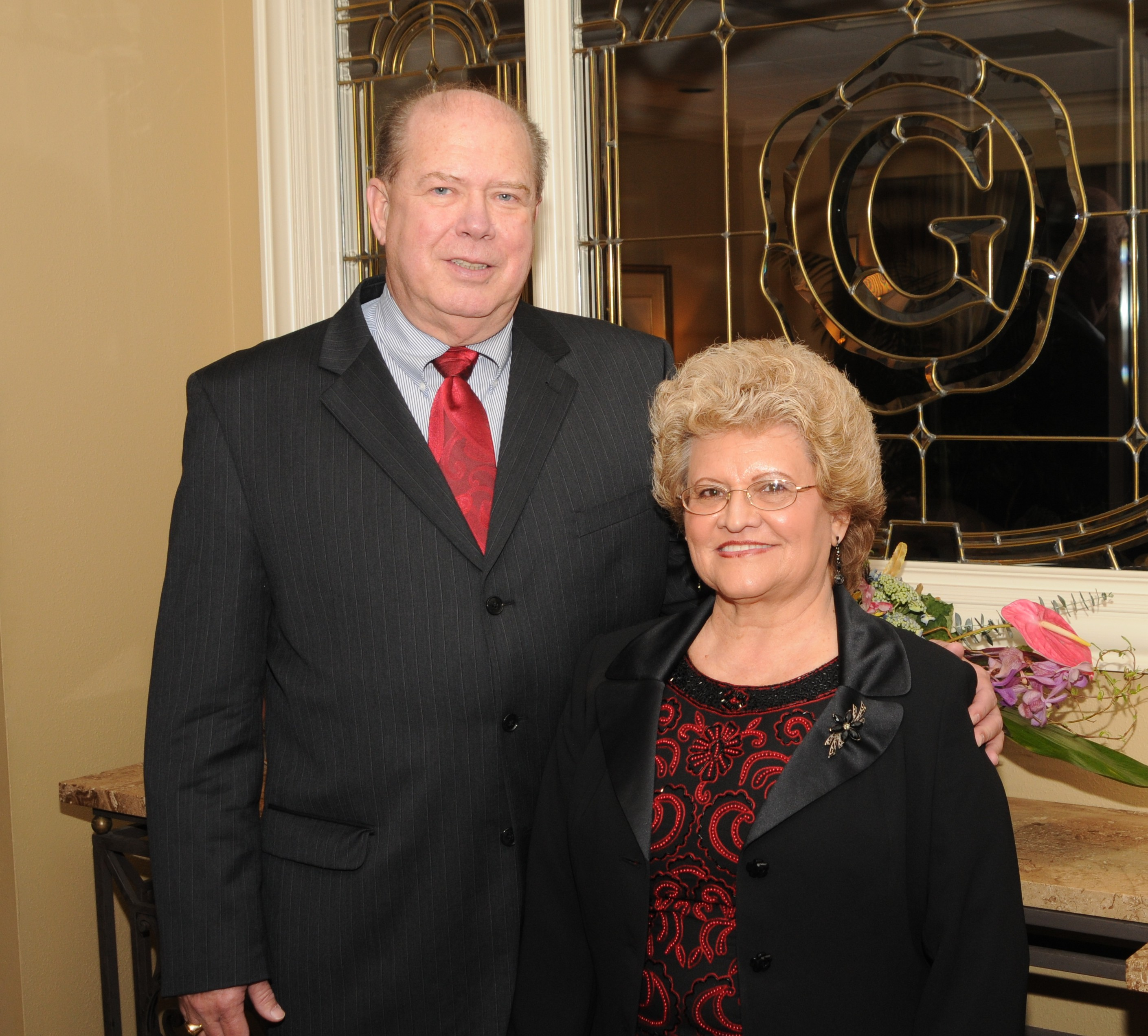
Billy and Billie Davis

Billy Davis married Billie J. Johnson on May 4, 1963, in Chattanooga, Tennessee. They have three grown children and live in Kennesaw, Georgia.

== Military career ==
Davis served four years in the Navy and two years in the Navy Reserves from 1963 to 1969, two of which were in Vietnam. Davis earned the National Defense Service Medal, The Vietnam Campaign Medal with Device (1960–), The Vietnam Service Medal (with two Bronze Stars) and the Navy Unit Commendation Ribbon and Letters of Commendations.

== Political career ==
Davis served two terms in the Arizona State Senate from January 3, 1983, through January 6, 1987, for the 19th district in Phoenix, Arizona.

In 1986, he was censured by the Senate Ethics Committee for failing to disclose his finances and poor judgment in his business practices.

He ran as a Congressional candidate in Georgia in 2016, during which time an investigation by FOX 5 found that he had been convicted of having lied on a 1997 loan application, for which he was incarcerated; had bankruptcies; and had a $782,560 judgment from a civil suit.

== Gallery ==
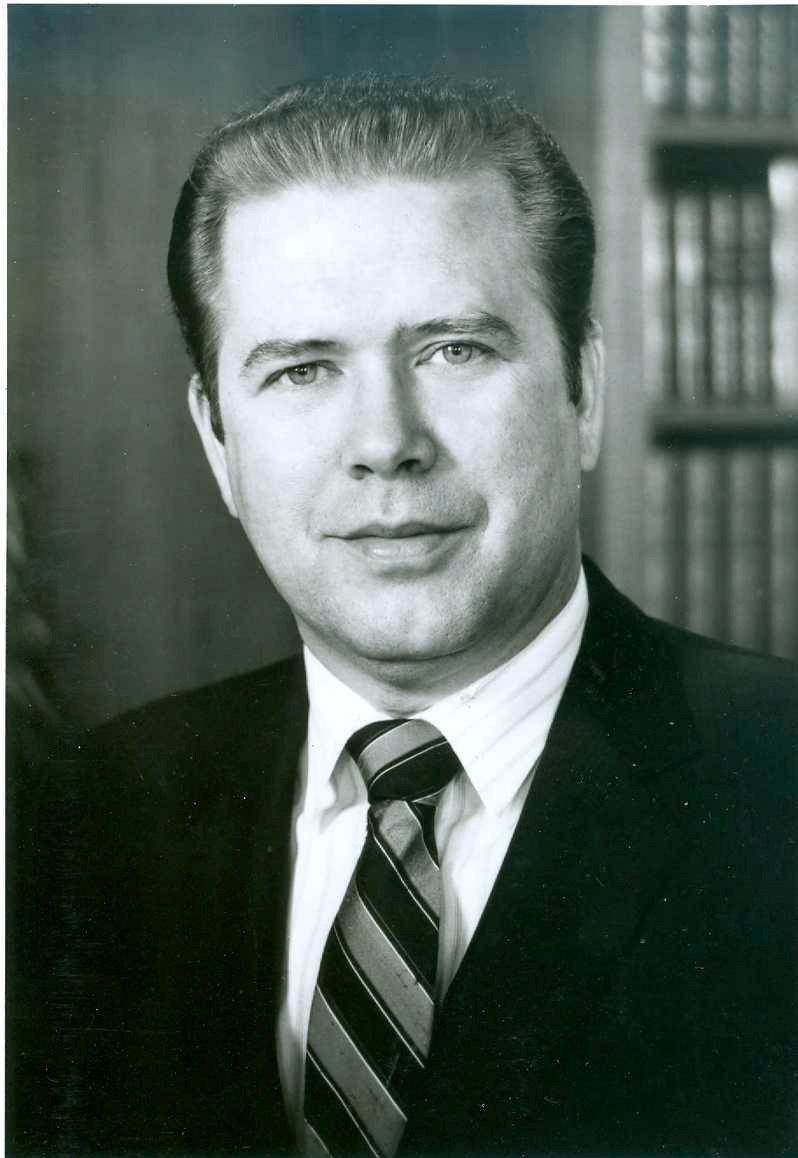
Senator Billy Davis

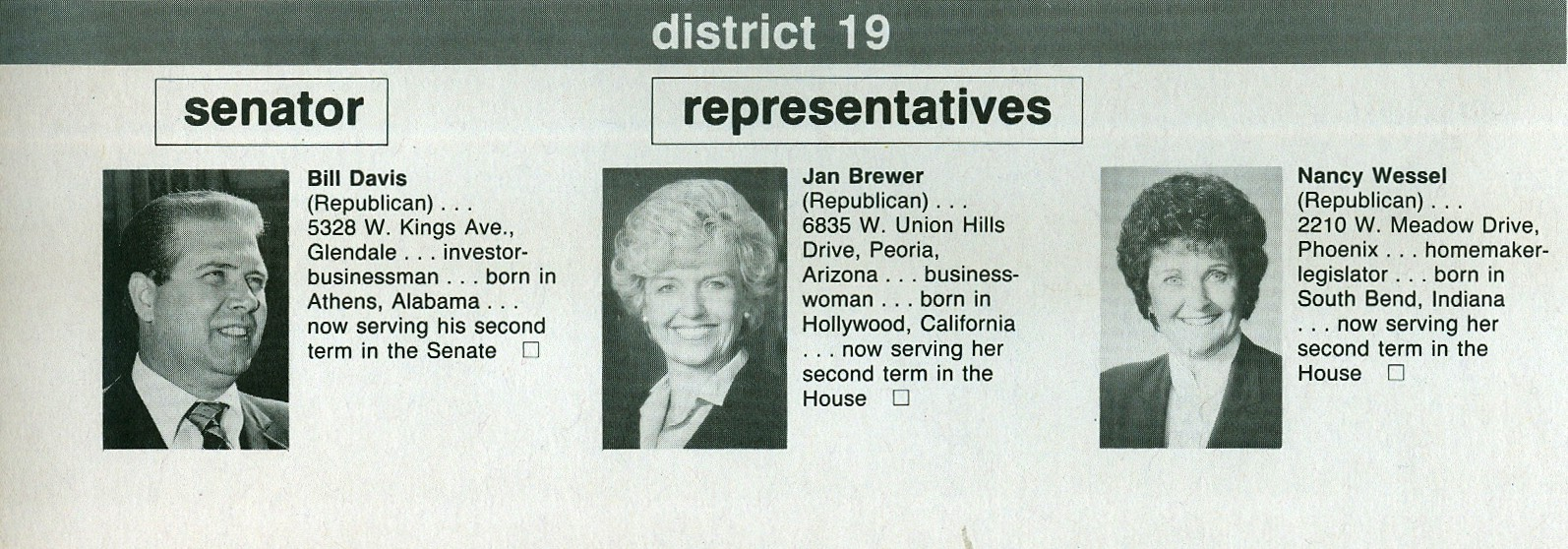
Davis Second Election Brochure with Rep Jan Brewer and Nancy Wessel
