= The News Courier =

Newspaper in Alabama, U.S.

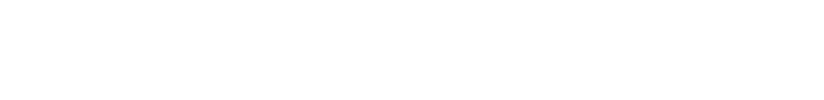
- Type: Newspaper published two days a week
- Format: Broadsheet
- Owner: Carpenter Media Group
- Publisher: Katherine Miller
- Founded: 1891 (as Limestone Democrat)
- Headquarters: 410 West Green Street; Athens, Alabama 35611; United States
- Website: enewscourier.com

The News Courier is a newspaper published two days a week in Athens, Alabama, covering Limestone County, Alabama. It is owned by Carpenter Media Group.

== History ==
Today's News Courier was created in 1969, when The Alabama Courier (founded 1892) and the Limestone Democrat (founded 1891) were acquired by Robert Bryan and merged. The combined paper was known in the 1980s as The Athens LC News Courier. Bryan sold his papers to Hollinger in 1997. When Hollinger dispersed of most of its papers, The News Courier was acquired by Community Newspaper Holdings, now known as CNHI, LLC.

The News Courier was a daily newspaper through the early 2010s, then reduced to six print editions per week. In April 2020, amid severe downturns in advertising revenue due to the COVID-19 pandemic, CNHI reduced the print-edition schedule to Tuesday, Wednesday, Thursday and Saturday.

In May 2024, CNHI sold the newspaper to Carpenter Media Group.

On October 30, 2024, print frequency was changed from four days per week to two, Wednesday and Saturday.
