= George Ruffin Bridgeforth =

American educator and farmer (1873–1955)

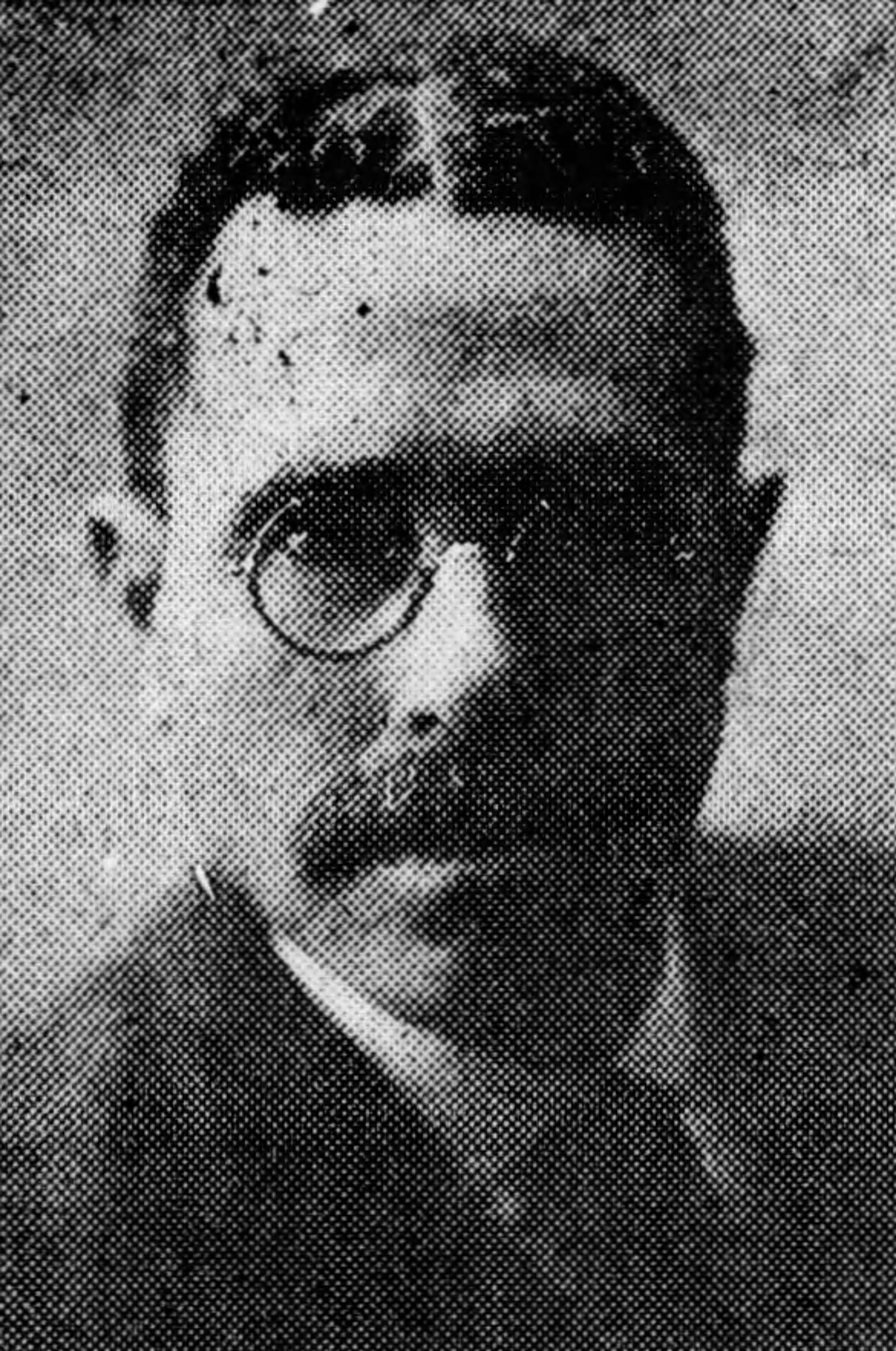
- Bridgeforth in 1919 photo
- Born: October 5, 1873; Athens, Alabama, U.S.
- Died: January 30, 1955 (aged 81); Athens, Alabama, U.S.
- Education: UMass Amherst (BS 1901)
- Occupations: Educator, farmer
- Employer: Tuskegee Institute
- Children: 4, inc. Elna Spaulding
- Relatives: Kenneth Spaulding (grandson)

George Ruffin Bridgeforth (October 5, 1873 – January 30, 1955) was an American farmer and educator. He was the first African American to attend the University of Massachusetts Amherst (then Massachusetts Agricultural College), graduating in 1901. He later taught agriculture and directed agricultural operations at the Tuskegee Institute in his home state of Alabama and led the Kansas Industrial and Educational Institute in Topeka. His descendents run a fifth-generation farm in Alabama—the state's largest Black-owned farm.

== Early life and education ==
Bridgeforth was born in Westmoreland, Limestone County, Alabama, on October 5, 1873. He was the eldest of nine children born to Jennie and George Bridgeforth Sr., emancipated African American farmers who purchased land in northern Alabama by 1877. George Jr. graduated from Trinity School in Athens, Alabama, in 1894 and completed college preparatory studies at Talladega College, a private historically Black college in Alabama, before enrolling at the Massachusetts Agricultural College in 1897.

Bridgeforth was popular with his classmates. He was elected sergeant-at-arms for the sophomore class, participated in the college Shakespeare club, served as president of the YMCA, won second prize in a speech contest, played football, and lectured on the "Agriculture of the South" to the Amherst Grange. In 1898, he appealed to the college trustees seeking a waiver of his tuition and fees, asserting poverty. In 1899, a farm accident with dynamite knocked out five of his teeth. Despite this mishap, he received his Bachelor of Science degree in 1901, becoming the first Black alumnus of the future UMass Amherst.

== Career ==
After graduation, Bridgeforth forged a career as an instructor and administrator at historically Black colleges in the South. He taught briefly at the State Normal School in Atlanta, Georgia, and in 1902 he became a professor of agriculture at the Tuskegee Institute, where he served under principal Booker T. Washington and initially worked as assistant to department chair George Washington Carver, two of the period's most prominent African American figures. In 1906, Bridgeforth was the first operator of the so-called Jesup agricultural wagon, a mobile classroom for educating farmers about agricultural scientific techniques.

A "big, energetic, blustery man with a flair and a taste for administrative power," Bridgeforth openly disdained Carver's abilities. Disputes between the men grew bitter and personal. In 1904, Washington threatened to split the agriculture department, relegating Carver to oversee the experiment station and agricultural instruction and promoting Bridgeforth to director of agricultural industries. Carver blocked this move by threatening to resign, but Washington implemented the reorganization four years later. The feud between Carver and Bridgeforth intensified to the point that Washington had to separate them at work, with Bridgeforth continuing to oversee agricultural education and operations while Carver oversaw the research enterprise. Washington died in 1915, and within three years, Bridgeforth had resigned to work as a county demonstration agent. In May 1918, he accepted a position as principal and president of the Kansas Industrial and Educational Institute, a small state vocational school with around 150 students and 20 teachers operating in Topeka, Kansas, since 1895. As president, Bridgeforth established a hospital and nursing education program at the school.

By 1923, Bridgeforth had returned home to Athens, Alabama, where he raised dairy cattle, sold real estate, and taught at the Tennessee Agricultural and Industrial College and Trinity School, which he attended in his youth. Committed to Black landownership as a means of self-improvement, Bridgeforth had become the largest Black landowner in Limestone County. In 1910, he co-founded the Southern Small Farm Land Company, which formed the basis for Beulahland, a cooperative Black farming community in northern Alabama. Bridgeforth donated the land for Beulahland's church and school.

== Farming legacy ==
As of 2019, Bridgeforth's two grandsons and three great-grandsons owned over 3,000 acres of Limestone County farmland and farmed an additional 7,000 acres, raising soybeans, cotton, corn, and other crops. Bridgeforth Farms is the largest Black-owned farm in Alabama. Cotton grown there was used to make Black History Month t-shirts sold at Target in 2022. Bridgeforth Farm has supplied cotton directly to Victoria's Secret since late 2023.

== Personal life ==
Bridgeforth married Datie Miller (1880–1971) of Athens, Alabama, on June 15, 1905. The couple had one son and three daughters, including Elna Spaulding, who served on the North Carolina Durham County Board of Commissioners from 1974 to 1984.

Bridgeforth died on January 30, 1955, at the age of 81 in Limestone County, Alabama.
