= Alfred McCullough =

American football player (born 1989)

No. 52
- Position: Offensive lineman

Personal information
- Born: July 16, 1989 (age 37); Athens, Alabama, U.S.
- Listed height: 6 ft 2 in (1.88 m)
- Listed weight: 320 lb (145 kg)

Career information
- High school: Athens (AL)
- College: Alabama
- NFL draft: 2012: undrafted

Career history
- Baltimore Ravens (2012)*; Philadelphia Eagles (2012)*; Tampa Bay Storm (2013–2016); Arizona Rattlers (2016)*
- * Offseason or practice squad member only

Awards and highlights
- 2× BCS national champion (2009, 2011)

Career AFL statistics
- Receptions: 5
- Receiving yards: 61
- Receiving TDs: 2
- Tackles: 7.5
- Fumble recoveries: 1
- Stats at ArenaFan.com

Alfred McCullough (born July 16, 1989) is an American former professional football offensive lineman. He played college football at the University of Alabama. He was a member of the Baltimore Ravens and Philadelphia Eagles of the National Football League (NFL), and the Tampa Bay Storm and Arizona Rattlers of the Arena Football League (AFL).

== Early life ==
McCullough played high school football at Athens High School in Athens, Alabama. He was named to The Birmingham News Super All-State Team and earned first-team Class 5A All-State honors from the Birmingham News. He was named Class 5A Most Valuable Lineman by the Alabama Sports Writers Association, helping the Golden Eagles advance to the Class 5A Alabama State Championship his senior year. McCullough totaled 61 tackles and 12 sacks as a senior. He compiled 67 tackles, 11 sacks, 16 tackles for loss and six pass breakups his junior season. He was an All-Region 8 selection and Alabama Class 5A, Region 8 Player of the Year his junior year in 2005. McCullough was also a first-team All-Area selection by the Decatur Daily.

== College career ==
McCullough played for the Alabama Crimson Tide from 2007 to 2011, playing in 31 games while starting six. He was redshirted in 2008. The Crimson Tide won the national championship in 2009 and 2011.

== Professional career ==
McCullough signed with the Baltimore Ravens of the National Football League (NFL) on April 29, 2012, after going undrafted in the 2012 NFL draft.

McCullough was signed by the Philadelphia Eagles of the NFL on May 17, 2012. He was released by the Eagles on August 25, 2012.

McCullough signed with the Tampa Bay Storm of the Arena Football League (AFL) on January 30, 2013. He started all fourteen games he played for the Storm his rookie year in 2013. He also played in fourteen games in 2014. McCullough became a free agent after the 2015 season. On December 1, 2015, McCullough was assigned to the Storm for the 2015 season. On June 6, 2016, McCullough was placed on reassignment.

On June 7, 2016, McCullough was claimed off reassignment by the Arizona Rattlers.
