= James C. Watkins =

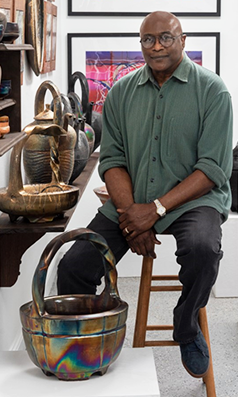
- Born: May 28, 1951 (age 75)
- Known for: Ceramics, Pottery

James C. Watkins (1951 - ) was born in Louisville, Kentucky, in 1951 and raised in a farming family in Athens, Alabama. He is a ceramic artist living in Lubbock, Texas who has worked with clay for over 40 years. He is known for his large scale double-walled ceramic vessels and laser cut porcelain substrate tiles. He is recognized for his textured surfaces, created by using alternative firing techniques. His porcelain substrate tiles are fumed with stannous chloride and multi-fired using ferric chloride, gold and platinum luster to achieve colorful surfaces.

Watkins gained recognition through his inclusion in the 1993 White House Collection of American Crafts, which was curated by Michael Monroe, who was then the director of the Renwick Gallery of the Smithsonian Institution. Watkins' work is held in 21 permanent collections, including the Clinton Library in Little Rock, Arkansas, the Shigaraki Institute of Ceramic Studies in Shigaraki, Japan, the Everson Museum in Syracuse, New York, the Tweed Museum in Duluth, Minnesota, and the Eiteljorg Museum in Indianapolis, Indiana. His work has been widely exhibited in 40 solo exhibitions and 164 group exhibitions.

== Academic and instructional position ==
Watkins is a Paul Whitfield Horn Professor Emeritus in the College of Architecture at Texas Tech University in Lubbock, Texas where he taught Architectural Ceramics and Architectural Drawing. The Horn Professorship is the highest honor that Texas Tech University bestows on members of its faculty. Horn Professorships are granted to professors in recognition of national and international distinction for outstanding research or other creative scholarly achievements.

== Personal background ==
Watkins uses his experience of growing up in the rural south during the 1950s and 60s as a source of inspiration for his signature work. His mother and father were farmers. Watkins is the oldest of six children - three boys and three girls. He grew up in a time when large cast-iron pots were still used as an essential farming utensil. His mother made soap, hominy and souse in the large black cast-iron pots. Watkins creates large double-walled ceramics forms that are inspired by the memory of helping his mother keep the fire burning hot around the cast-iron pots.

== Awards ==
Watkins has been honored for his contributions to the arts and teaching.

- 1990 The President's Excellence in Teaching Award, Texas Tech University
- 2005 Senior Fulbright Scholar Fellowship, Vietnam, (teaching at the Ho Chi Minh City University of Architecture)
- 2013 William D. Kerns Award for the Visual Arts
- 2016 Art on the Llano Estacado Legacy Award, presented by Texas Tech University Museum Association
- 2019 Texas Master Award given by the Houston Center for Contemporary Craft
- 2023 Texas State Visual Artist 3D Award, presented by the Texas Commission on the Arts
- 2024 West Texas Walk of Fame inductee, presented by Civic Lubbock, Inc.
- 2024 BADG Legacy Grant Recipient, presented by Black Artist +Designers Guild Grants. Funded by the Maxwell Hanrahan Foundation

== Education ==
- 1973 Kansas City Art Institute, Ceramics/Drawing, B.F.A
- 1977 Indiana University-Bloomington, Ceramics, M.F.A

== Publications by James C. Watkins ==
- Architectural Delineation Presentation Techniques and Projects 1st ed., James T. Davis, James C. Watkins; Published by Kendall/Hunt Publishing Company, 2000, 168 pages ISBN 0-7872-6231-5 (paperback)
- Architectural Delineation Presentation Techniques and Projects 2nd ed., James T. Davis, James C. Watkins; Published by Kendall Hunt Publishing Company, 2001, 168 pages ISBN 0-7872-8850-0 (paperback) Find this book
- Alternative Kilns & Firing Techniques, James C. Watkins, Paul Andrew Wandless; Published by Lark Books, a division of Sterling Publishing Company, 2004, 127 pages ISBN 1-57990-4556 (hardcover) ISBN 1-57990-952-3 (paperback) Find this book
- Niedrigbrand, (German translation of Alternative Kiln & Firing Techniques), James C. Watkins, Paul Andrew Wandless; Published by Lark Books, a division of Sterling Publishing Company, 2005, 127 pages ISBN 3-936489-11-4 (hardcover) Find this book
- Reflections Made of Memories, James C. Watkins; Distributed by Kendall/Hunt Publishing Company, 2019, 118 pages ISBN 978-1-7335071-0-3 (hardcover) Find this book

== Publications about James C. Watkins' life and art ==
- A Meditation of Fire The Art of James C. Watkins, by Kippra D. Hopper; Publish by Texas Tech University Press, 1999, 136 pages ISBN 0-89672-419-0 (hardcover) Find this book

== Gallery ==
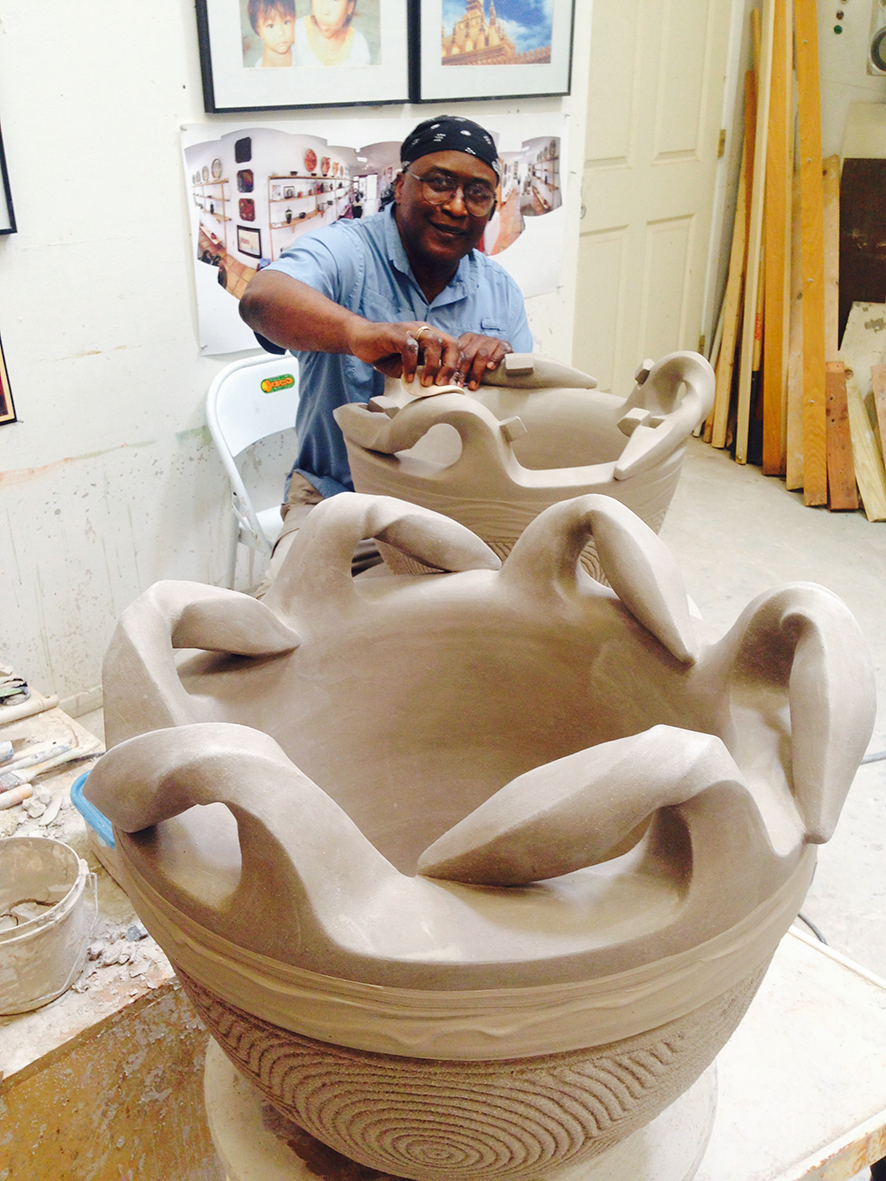
James C. Watkins working in his studio.

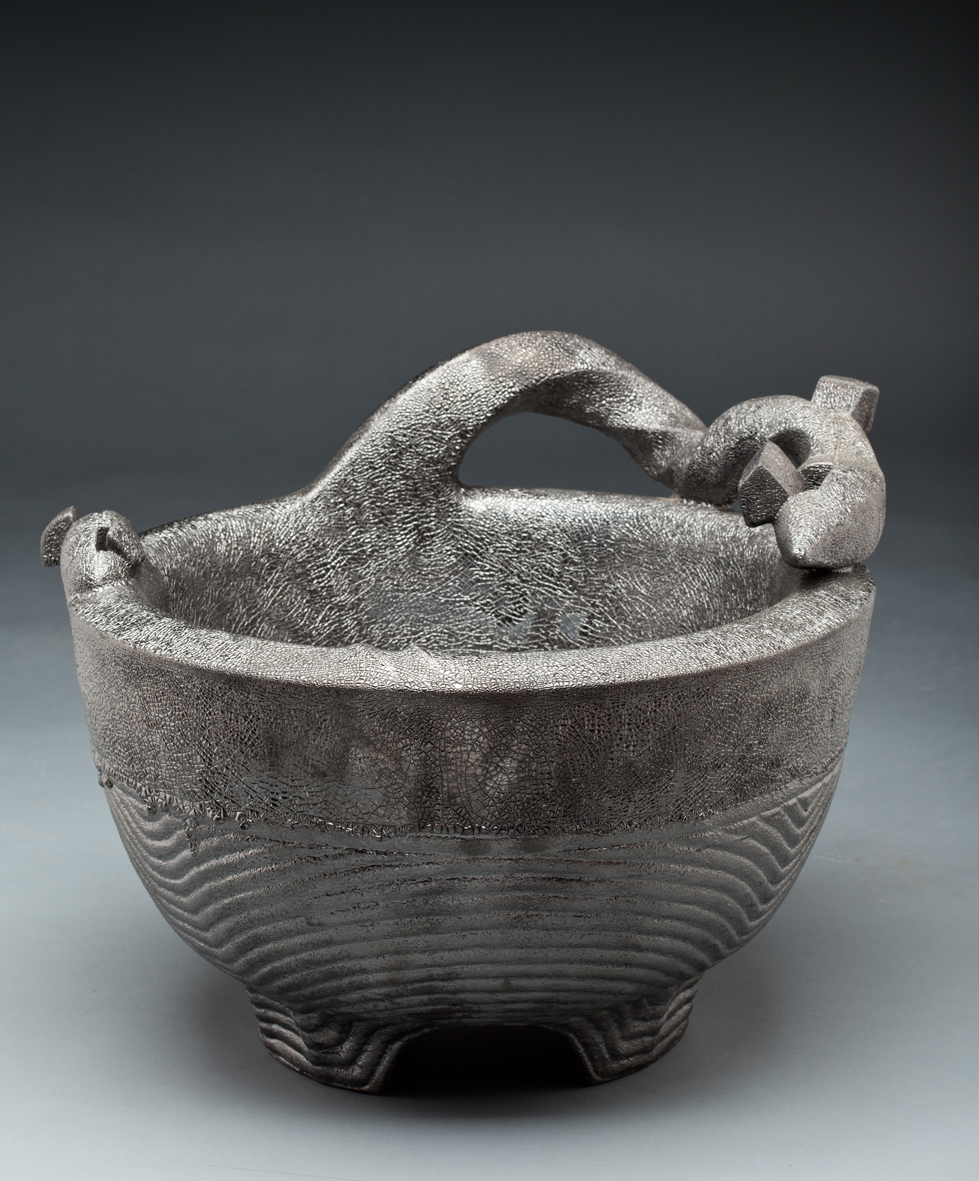
Double-walled Caldron from the ("Fragility Series"), saggar fired, 20 in. high x 20 in. wide, photo by Jon Thompson.

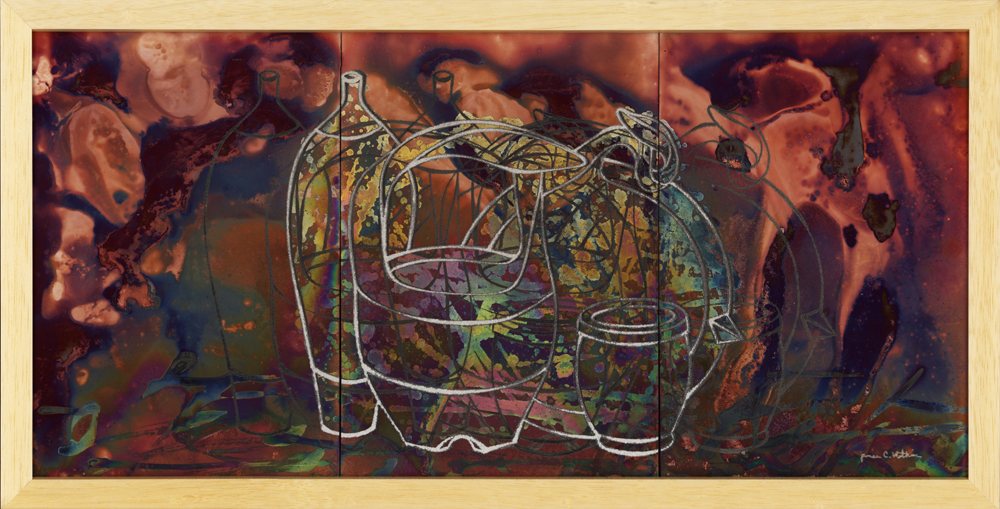
Multi-fired porcelain substrate tile piece from the ("Reflections Series"), 12 in. high x 24 in. wide, photo by Denny Mingus.
