= Alice Vassar LaCour =

American educator and singer

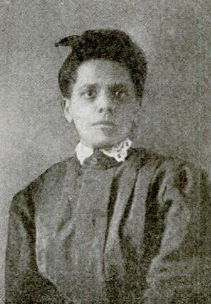
- Alice Vassar LaCour, from a 1924 publication.
- Born: Alice Maud Vassar; 1870s Athens, Alabama
- Died: 1924
- Occupations: Educator, singer

Alice Vassar LaCour (born 1870s – died 1924) was an American educator and singer.

== Early life and education ==
Alice Maud Vassar was from Athens, Alabama, where she attended the Trinity School run by missionary Mary Fletcher Wells. She graduated from Fisk University's normal school in 1887.

== Career ==
LaCour was a Fisk Jubilee Singer, touring with the company from 1890 to 1891. For many years afterward, she was featured on concert programs and conducted choruses at festivals.

LaCour and her husband taught at American Missionary Association (AMA) schools in Jonesborough, Tennessee, Augusta, Georgia, and in Chapel Hill and Lawndale, North Carolina. She was principal of the AMA school in Springfield, Tennessee.

== Personal life and legacy ==
Alice Vassar married fellow educator and Fisk Jubilee singer Paul Louis LaCour in 1893, in Nashville. Their wedding was attended by much of the faculty of Fisk University. The university's president, Erastus Milo Cravath, performed the ceremony. The LaCours had daughters Lucile, Marion, and Gretchen. Alice Vassar LaCour died in 1924.

LaCour was a character in Arise and Build (2016), a musical play about the history of Trinity School, performed for the school's 150th anniversary.
