= Kenneth Spaulding =

American politician

Ken Spaulding

Member of the North Carolina House of Representatives from the 16th district
- In office 1978–1984

Personal details
- Born: November 29, 1944 (age 81) Durham, North Carolina, U.S.
- Party: Democratic
- Education: Howard University (BA); University of North Carolina School of Law (JD)

Kenneth Bridgeforth Spaulding (born November 29, 1944) is an American politician and attorney from North Carolina. A member of the Democratic Party from Durham, North Carolina, Spaulding served in the North Carolina House of Representatives from 1978 to 1984.

== Early life and career ==
Spaulding is the son of Asa T. Spaulding Sr., former president of North Carolina Mutual Life Insurance Company, and Elna Spaulding, Durham County's first female county commissioner. His grandfather, George Ruffin Bridgeforth, was a former Tuskegee Institute administrator and Alabama farmer.

Spaulding is a graduate of Howard University (cum laude, 1967), where he received a Bachelor of Arts degree in Government with minors in Business Administration and Sociology. He received his Juris Doctor from the University of North Carolina School of Law in 1970. He represented notable clients and served on the O. J. Simpson dream team. He went on to represent many national developers of major residential and commercial developments in Durham, North Carolina.

== Political career ==
Spaulding served in the North Carolina House of Representatives from 1978 to 1984. He ran for the United States House of Representatives to represent North Carolina's 2nd congressional district in 1984, challenging incumbent Democrat Tim Valentine in the primary. Spaulding lost, taking 60,535 votes (47.88%) to Valentine's 65,893 (52.12%).

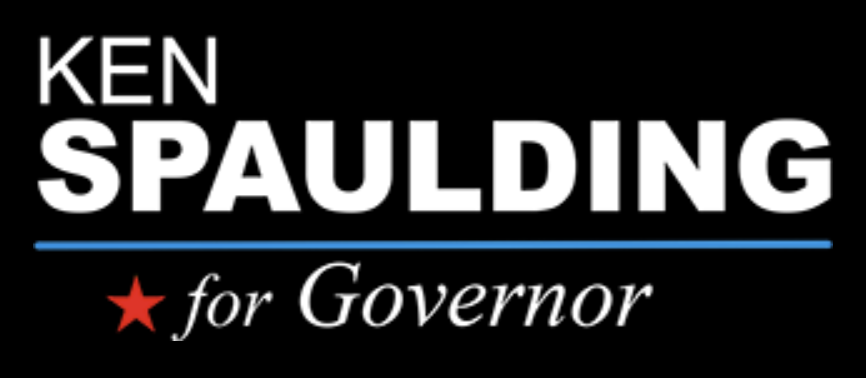
Ken Spaulding for Governor logo

Spaulding later served on the North Carolina Board of Transportation under Governor Mike Easley. He announced in 2013 that he would run for the Democratic nomination in the 2016 North Carolina gubernatorial election. He lost the primary to Roy Cooper, who ended up winning the election.
