= P. O. Davis =

American educator (1890–1973)

- Born: August 15, 1890; Skinhead Community, near Athens, Alabama
- Died: 1973 (aged 82–83); API, Auburn, Alabama
- Education: B.S., Alabama Polytechnic Institute (now Auburn University)
- Occupations: Agricultural editor Cooperative Extension educator Administrator; Broadcaster
- Spouse: Mildred Kilburn
- Parent(s): Richard Scoggins and Milinda Elizabeth (Barker) Davis

Posey Oliver "P.O." Davis (August 15, 1890 – 1973) was an American educator, administrator, agricultural editor, and broadcaster. He served as director of the Alabama Extension Service and was its longest-serving leader.

== Early life ==
Davis was born on August 15, 1890, in Skinhead, a rural community near Athens, Alabama, to Richard Scoggins Davis and Mildred Elizabeth Barker. According to Davis, his family settled in the area after being displaced from McMinn County, Tennessee, during the Civil War.

Davis worked as a public school teacher from 1909 to 1912. He subsequently enrolled at Alabama Polytechnic Institute (API, now Auburn University) in Auburn, Alabama, and graduated in 1916. Following graduation, Davis was employed as a horticulturist at the Alabama Agricultural Experiment Station and later as an agriculturist with Southern Railway. He also briefly served as an assistant boys' club agent.

In 1918, Davis married Mildred Kilburn of Florence, Alabama. He subsequently worked for Progressive Farmer before returning to Alabama Polytechnic Institute in 1920, where he served as agricultural editor for the Alabama Agricultural Experiment Station and the Alabama Extension Service.

== Work at Alabama Polytechnic Institute ==
In 1922, API was offered $2,500 to establish an educational radio station for farmers by Birmingham News publisher Victor Hanson. Ralph Brown Draughon, who was university president at the time, recalled that Davis said the donation was not enough to cover broadcasting or operating costs. Extension Director Luther Duncan worried the university would face bad publicity if the gift was refused. Davis, who worked as editor and publicist, was then asked to find the money and staff needed to run WMAV, which began operating in February 1923. In the end, the Extension Service spent far more than the original $2,500 donation.

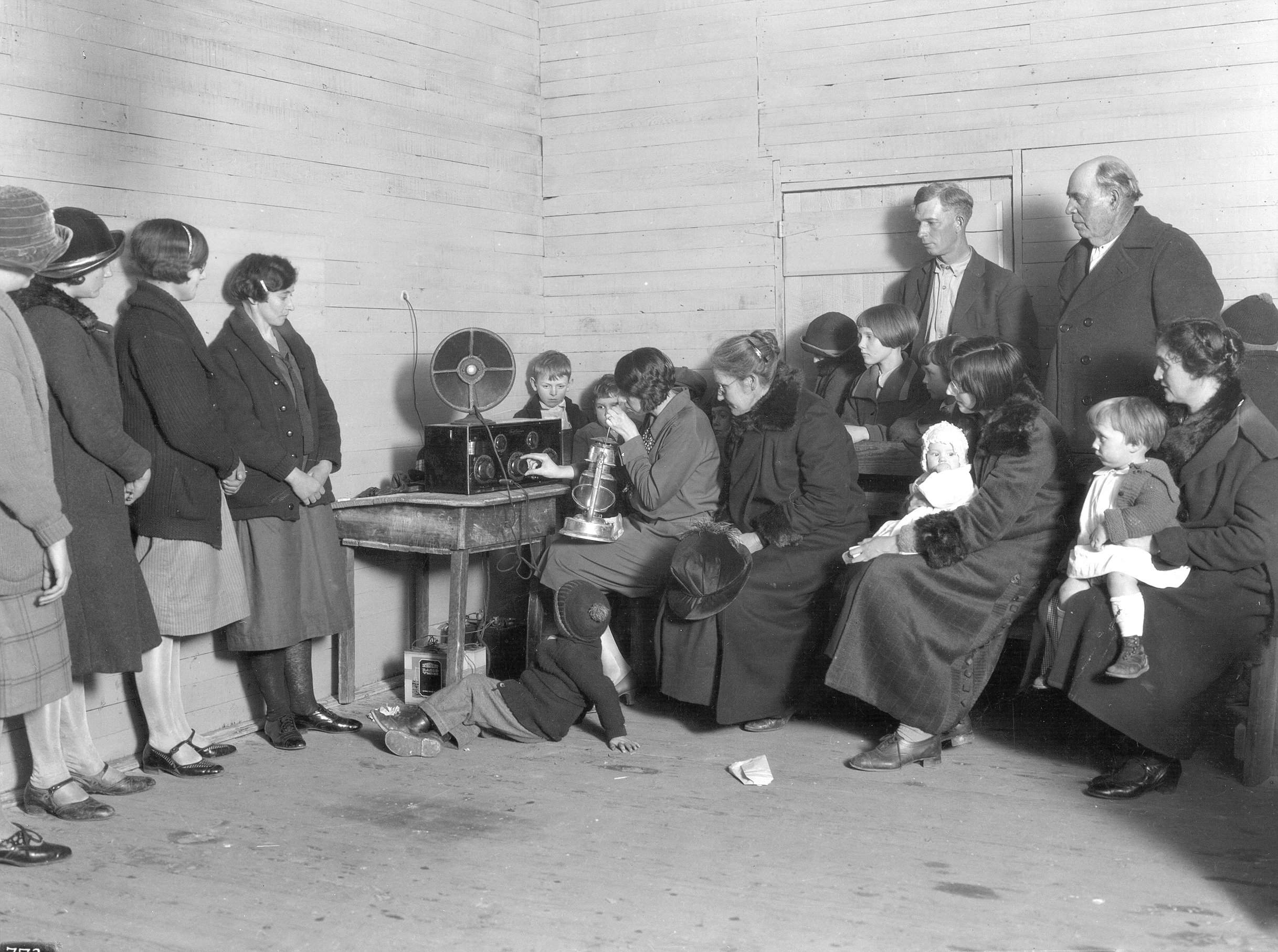
Extension Home Demonstration Agent Thalia Bell operates a radio at the Sandy Creek-East View Club, Tallapoosa County, Feb. 4, 1926.

Having acquired new equipment, API relocated the station to Comer Hall and rebranded it as WAPI. Davis organized listening events throughout the state and subsequently moved the station to Birmingham after unsuccessful attempts to secure a network affiliation. City officials agreed to cover roughly half of the estimated $20,000 annual running costs, and Davis brokered a partnership with the University of Alabama and Alabama College at Montevallo to share the financial burden.

This arrangement lasted until the Great Depression in 1929, when the city ended its support, forcing Davis to lease the station. WAPI continued to give the three institutions broadcast access and produced a steady annual return on their investment from about 1922 to 1961.

While serving as general manager of WAPI, Davis also remained editor for the Extension Service and the Experiment Station. His work as an agricultural editor influenced Extension programs in other states, which aimed to reach farmers through print and radio.

=== Extension Director ===
From 1933 to 1936, he served as executive secretary and registrar. After Luther Duncan was appointed API president in 1937, Davis became the longest-tenured director of the Alabama Extension Service.

Some criticized Davis for his idealism and lack of understanding of other farmers, while others viewed him as an extrovert with strong skills. He delivered numerous public addresses on agricultural development and the Extension Service's educational role.

Davis developed working relationships with Alabama newspapers and farm home publications. Extension educational broadcasts were aired six days a week across Alabama. In addition, Davis launched "This Month in Rural Alabama", an 8-page tabloid that ran as an insert in 97 Alabama weekly newspapers, with a publishing run of 100,000 weekly copies.

In the 1940s, there was a dispute between Davis and Elbert H. Norton, the state school superintendent, over the succession of Luther Duncan as API president.

== Views on industrialization ==
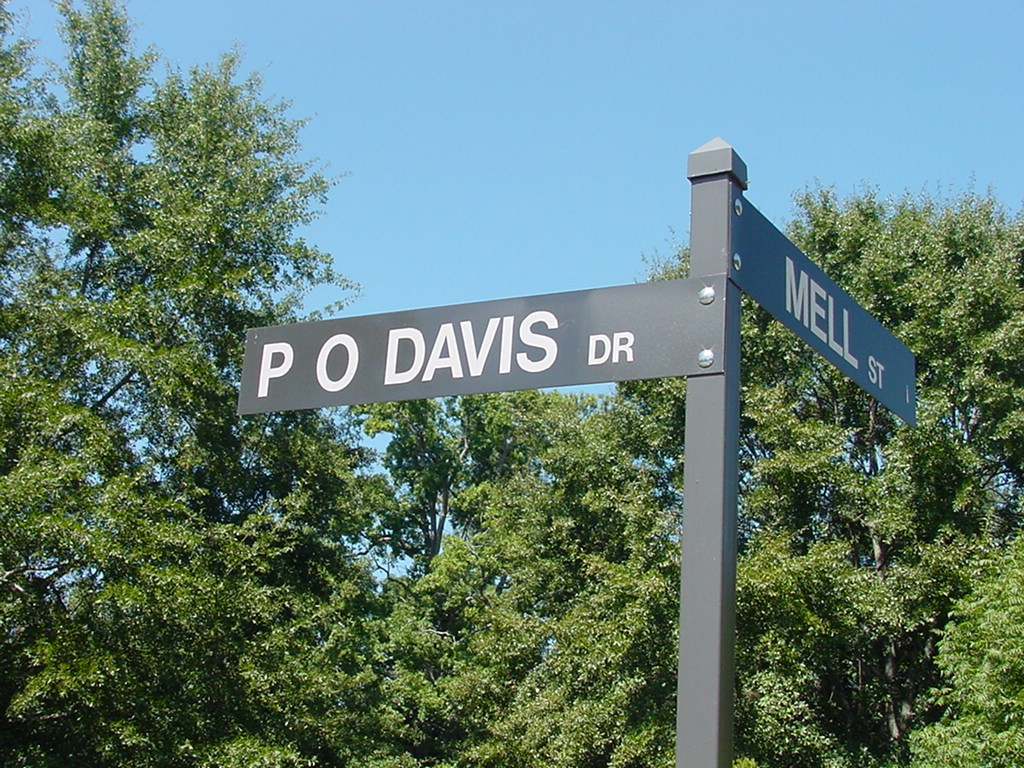
P. O. Davis Drive, named in honor of Davis, on the Auburn University campus

Davis was concerned by the regional reliance and farm surpluses associated with improved cotton farming methods. He felt crops should be diversified, and in 1937, he stated, "It is plain to me that cotton, upon which we are relying very largely for money income, must have help," suggesting poultry and livestock as good options for farmers.

Davis was a member of the U.S. Democratic Party and feared the wider societal effects of industrialization. He stated that these effects were clearly visible by the growing number of professionally employed Americans and that individual freedom was largely gone because one who works for another is not exactly free. He additionally advocated for traditional workers.

He believed that small business owners, such as farmers and shopkeepers, were essential to preserving freedom in America because they were "part capitalist and part worker." This Jeffersonian mindset heavily influenced his sympathy for the Farm Bureau concept, believing they would enable farmers to withstand big government and big business.

== Clash with Jim Folsom ==
Alabama Governor Jim Folsom criticized Davis's goal of building up extension to reach as many rural Alabamians as possible, maintaining that this focus often came at the expense of other agencies. Further, as ex officio chairman of the API Board of Trustees, Folsom filed charges at a trustees meeting on February 21, 1947. He claimed that Alabama agriculture had declined partly because of Davis's mismanagement of the Extension. Folsom also alleged that the Extension failed to cooperate with other farm agencies, claiming a conflict of interest had occurred because of Davis's political beliefs. Davis was cleared by the trustees, who commended him for his work.

== Retirement ==
Davis retired in 1959 and was succeeded by E. T. York. He spent the last years of his life compiling a genealogy of the Davis family and serving on several professional and charitable boards. He also served as president of the Alabama Writers Council from 1962 to 1963. Among his honors, Progressive Farmer magazine voted him "Man of the Year" in Agriculture, and the American Farm Bureau awarded him a medal and certificate in 1945. He was also listed in Who's Who in America for 1952–53.
