= Athens City Schools (Alabama) =

School district in Alabama, United States

Location
- Athens, Limestone County, Alabama; United States

District information
- Acting Superintendent: Beth Patton

Students and staff
- Students: 3,904
- Teachers: 230

Other information
- Website: www.acs-k12.org

Athens City Schools is the public school district of Athens, Alabama, United States. As of 2016 it has some 3,904 students and 230 full-time teachers. The district includes one high school (Athens High School), one middle school (6-8) Athens Middle School, one intermediate school (4-5) Athens Intermediate School, and four elementary academies (K-3) i Academy at Athens Elementary, FAME Academy at Brookhill, SPARK Academy at Cowart, and HEART Academy at Julian Newman. Athens City Schools has one non-traditional blended learning school (K-12) Athens Renaissaince School. As of July 2020, the acting superintendent is Beth Patton.
