= Mary Fletcher Wells =

American educator (died 1893)

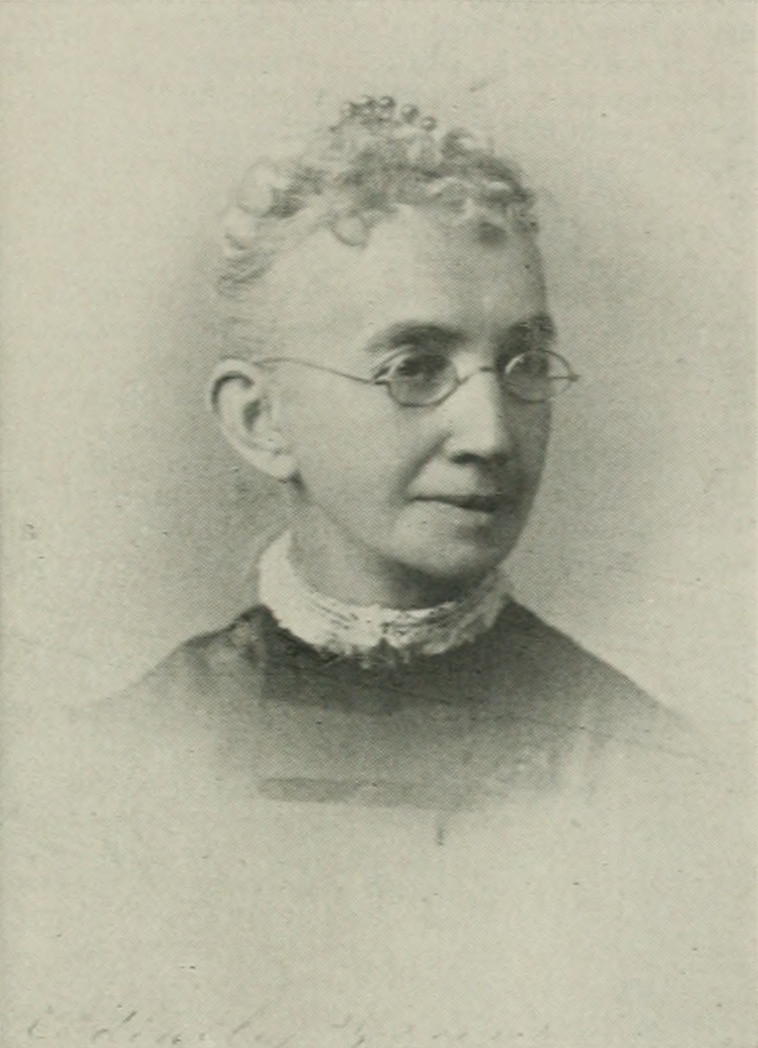
- Wells from A Woman of the Century
- Born: Villenova, New York
- Occupation: educator
- Known for: Trinity School

Mary Fletcher Wells (died September 14, 1893) was a philanthropist, educator, and founder of the Trinity School. Wells was unable to formally matriculate at Michigan University and instead studied there under private tutelage. She taught in high schools and seminaries in Indiana.

Wells was born in Villenova, New York, to Roderick Wells and Mary Greenleaf, the sixth of ten children.

After the Civil War, she was determined to educate formerly enslaved people and their children, and relocated to Athens, Alabama, initially to care for wounded Union soldiers as a Baptist missionary. She founded the Trinity School. The school was sponsored by the Western Freedmen's Aid Commission and the American Missionary Association, located in a Baptist church in 1865.

Wells initially taught under the protection of armed guards. It was the only high school for black students in the county and the first school in the northern half of the state offering kindergarten for black children. The school had an integrated faculty by 1892. Wells would teach, can fruits and vegetables for the winter, and return north to raise funds for the school in the summers. She remained at the school for twenty-seven years. Trinity was closed after court-ordered desegregation in 1970.

While teaching at Trinity, Wells made the acquaintance of Patti Malone and Alice Vassar LaCour, who performed with the Fisk Jubilee Singers. She traveled with the singers for the first four months of their US tour. She retired back to her summer home in Chautauqua, New York, where she was an early member of the Chautauqua Literary and Scientific Circle.
