= Athens, Alabama =

City in and county seat of Limestone County, Alabama

- City
- City of Athens
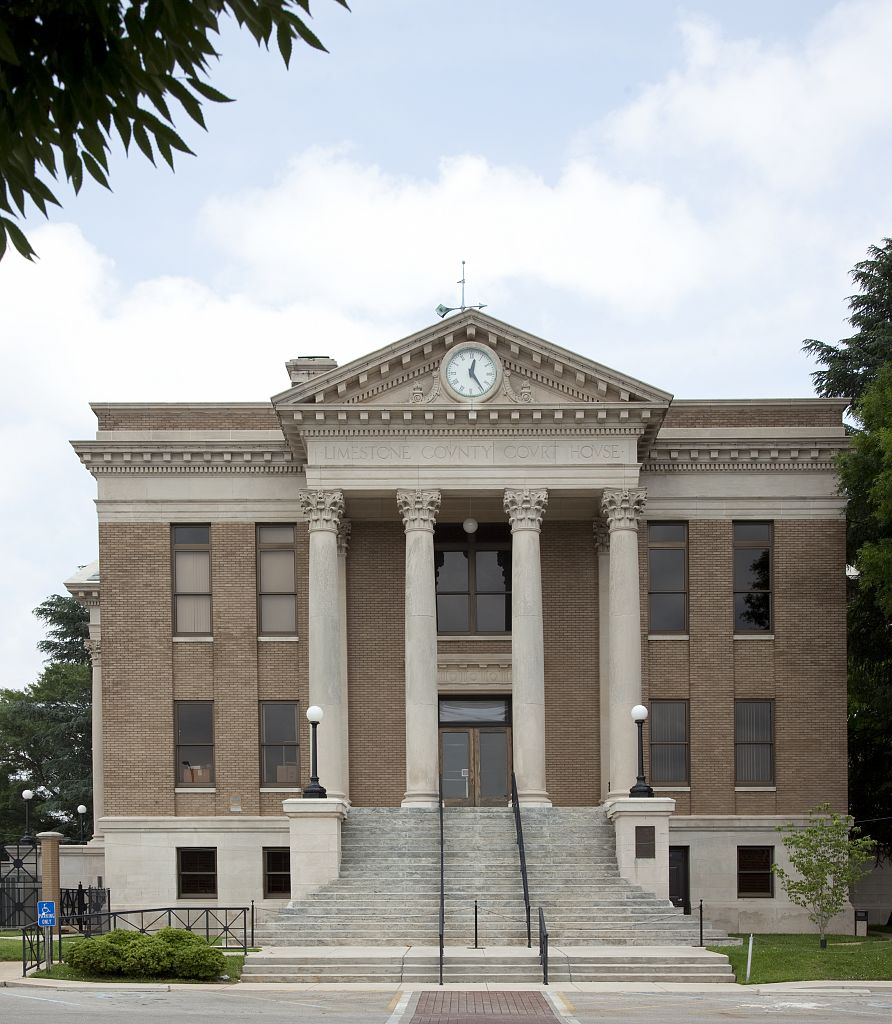
- Limestone County Courthouse in Athens

- Flag Logo

- Location of Athens in Limestone County, Alabama
- Coordinates: 34°45′35″N 86°54′23″W
- Country: United States
- State: Alabama
- County: Limestone
- Incorporated: November 19, 1818
- Named for: Athens, Greece

Government
  - Type: Mayor Council

Area
  - Total: 40.87 sq mi (105.85 km^{2})
  - Land: 40.60 sq mi (105.16 km^{2})
  - Water: 0.26 sq mi (0.68 km^{2})
- Elevation: 656 ft (200 m)

Population (2020)
  - Total: 25,406
  - Density: 625.7/sq mi (241.58/km^{2})
- Time zone: UTC−6 (CST)
  - Summer (DST): UTC−5 (CDT)
- ZIP Code: 35611–35614–35613
- Area codes: 256
- FIPS code: 01-02956
- GNIS feature ID: 2403123
- Website: www.athensalabama.us

Athens is a city in and the county seat of Limestone County, in the U.S. state of Alabama; it is included in the Huntsville–Decatur–Albertville combined statistical area. As of the 2020 census, the population of the city is 25,407.

== History ==
Founded in 1818 by John Coffee, Robert Beaty, John D. Carroll, and John Read, Athens is one of the oldest incorporated cities in the state, having been incorporated one year prior to the state's admittance to the Union in 1819. Limestone County was also created by an act of the Alabama Territorial Legislature in 1818. The town was first called Athenson, but was incorporated as Athens after the ancient city in Greece. The town's first mayor was Samuel Tanner, and the Tanner area, south of Athens, was named on his behalf.

The Athens area was the home of William Wyatt Bibb, the first governor of Alabama, and its second governor, his brother Thomas Bibb, who succeeded him in office when he died in a fall from his horse.

Before European settlers arrived, the area which would become Athens was part of Chickasaw lands, settlers from Tennessee began intruding into what would become Limestone County in the first decade of the 1800s; the Chickasaw ceded lands north and east of the Tennessee River by about 1816, opening legal settlement in the area. Encyclopedia of Alabama

In 1818, a group of land speculators, including Robert Beaty and John D. Carroll, purchased 160 acres and began selling lots in what would become the city of Athens. The city was incorporated on November 19, 1818 — notably before Alabama even became a state (December 14, 1819). On March 22, 1819, the city was chosen as the county seat for the newly formed Limestone County.

Cotton and agriculture dominated the economy in these early years. Due to the fertile soil of the Tennessee Valley region, it drew settlers who believed the land would sustain crops and prosperity.

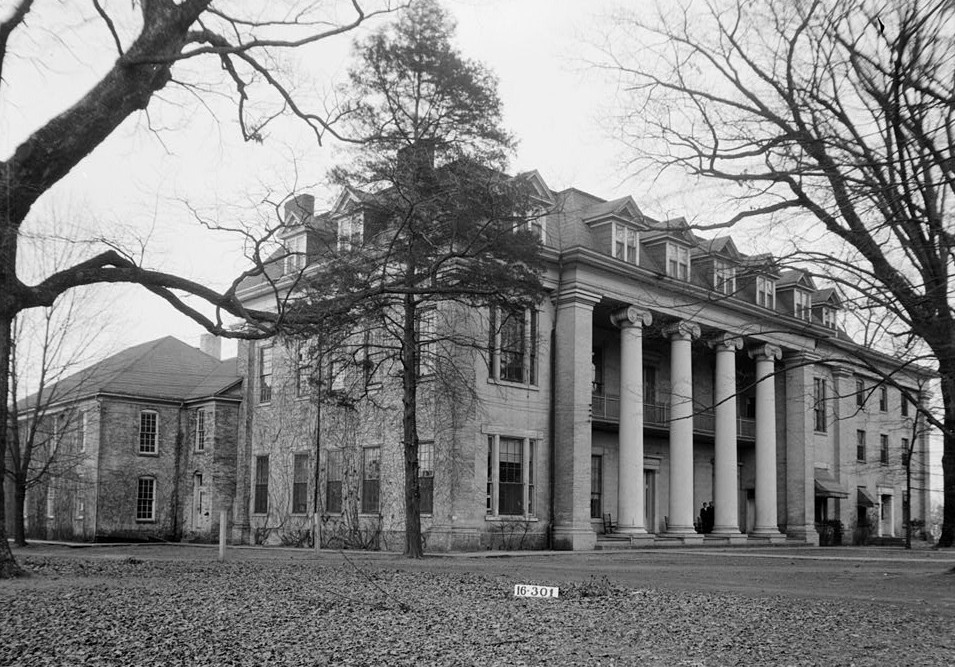
Founders Hall, Athens State University. (WPA photo 1930s)

In 1822, local residents purchased 5 acres (20,000 m^{2}) of land and constructed a building to house the Athens Female Academy. The school became affiliated with the Methodist church in 1842, and was eventually renamed Athens Female College. After becoming coeducational in 1932, the school changed its name again to Athens College. After being taken over by the State of Alabama in 1974, the college was converted to a "reverse junior college", offering the last two years of instruction for graduates of area community colleges. It is today known as Athens State University.

Many homes in the central part of modern Athens date to the antebellum period, and are part of historic preservation districts.

On May 2, 1862, during the Civil War, Athens was seized by Union forces under the command of Col. John Basil Turchin. After occupying the town on May 2, 1862, Turchin assembled his men and reportedly said, "I shut my eyes for two hours. I see nothing". He did, in fact, leave the town to reconnoiter defensive positions, during which time his men ransacked the town. Turchin was later court-martialed over his treatment of Athens. The incident was controversial, and Lost Cause supporters vilified Turchin.

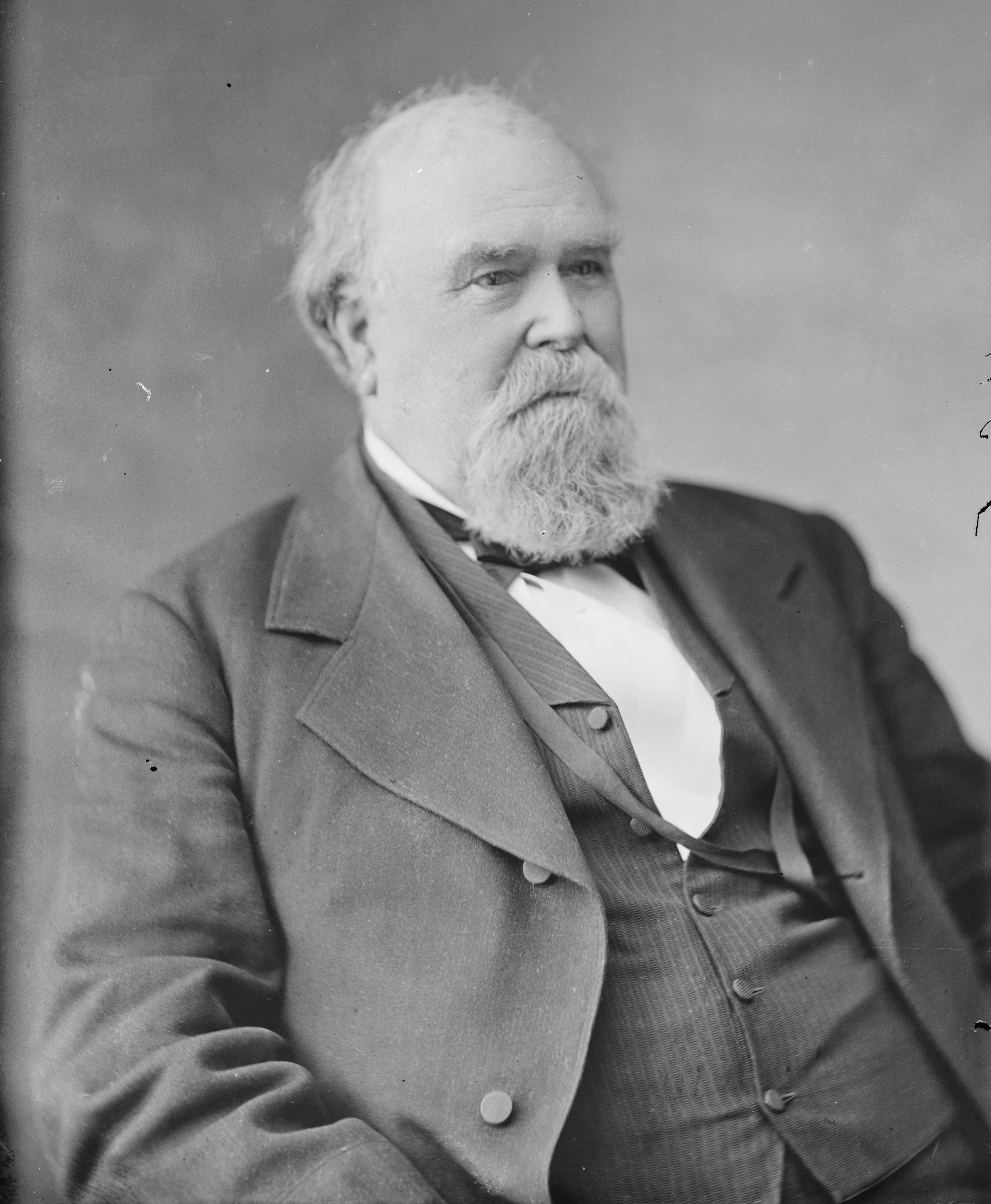
Governor George S. Houston

Athens was the home of Governor George S. Houston, Alabama's first post-Reconstruction Democratic governor, who served from 1874 through 1878. Houston was noted for reducing the debts incurred to benefit private railroad speculators and others by his Reconstruction Republican predecessors. During Reconstruction, Athens was the home of the Trinity School, a school founded for the children of former slaves by Mary Fletcher Wells and funded by the American Missionary Association.

Athens was traditionally a cotton and railroad town, but since the local aerospace boom of the 1950s and 1960s, it has increasingly entered the orbit of nearby industry center Huntsville as the area's cotton production has steadily declined.

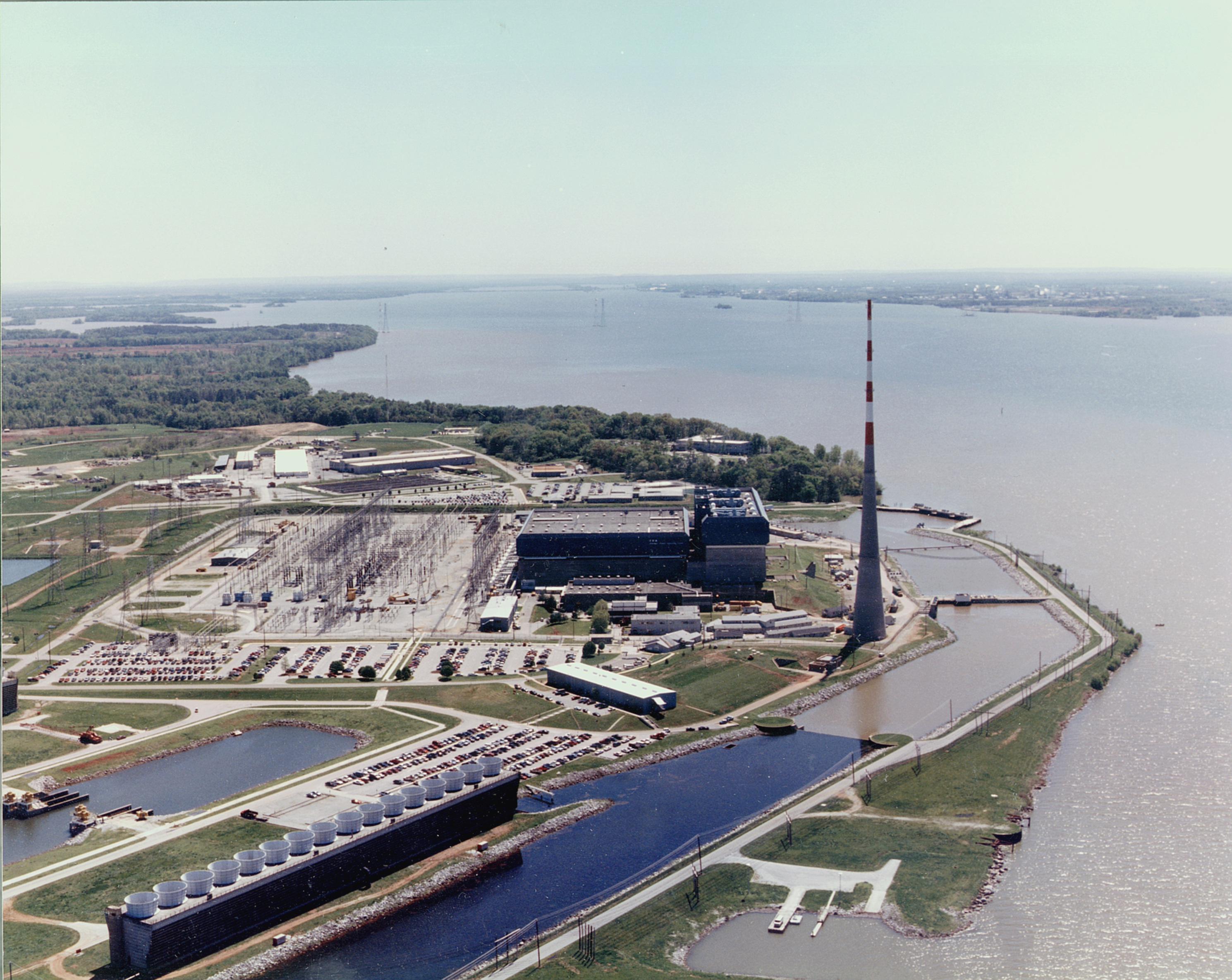
Browns Ferry Nuclear Power Station. Nuclear Regulatory Commission photo.

Athens is the home of Browns Ferry Nuclear Power Plant, a Tennessee Valley Authority installation first operated in 1974, that was once the world's largest nuclear plant. It provides many jobs to the area and most of the electricity for the Huntsville-Decatur Metro Area. On March 22, 1975, the Browns Ferry plant became the scene of what was, with the exception of the Three Mile Island accident, the most serious nuclear accident in United States history. A worker using a candle to check for air leaks started a fire among control wires, causing a temporary threat to operational control of the reactor (see Browns Ferry Nuclear Power Plant article on Unit One Fire).

On December 28, 2024, a high-end EF1 tornado struck downtown Athens causing significant damage to the Limestone Courthouse square and caused roof damage to many businesses in downtown Athens and several trees were uprooted including one outside the courthouse.

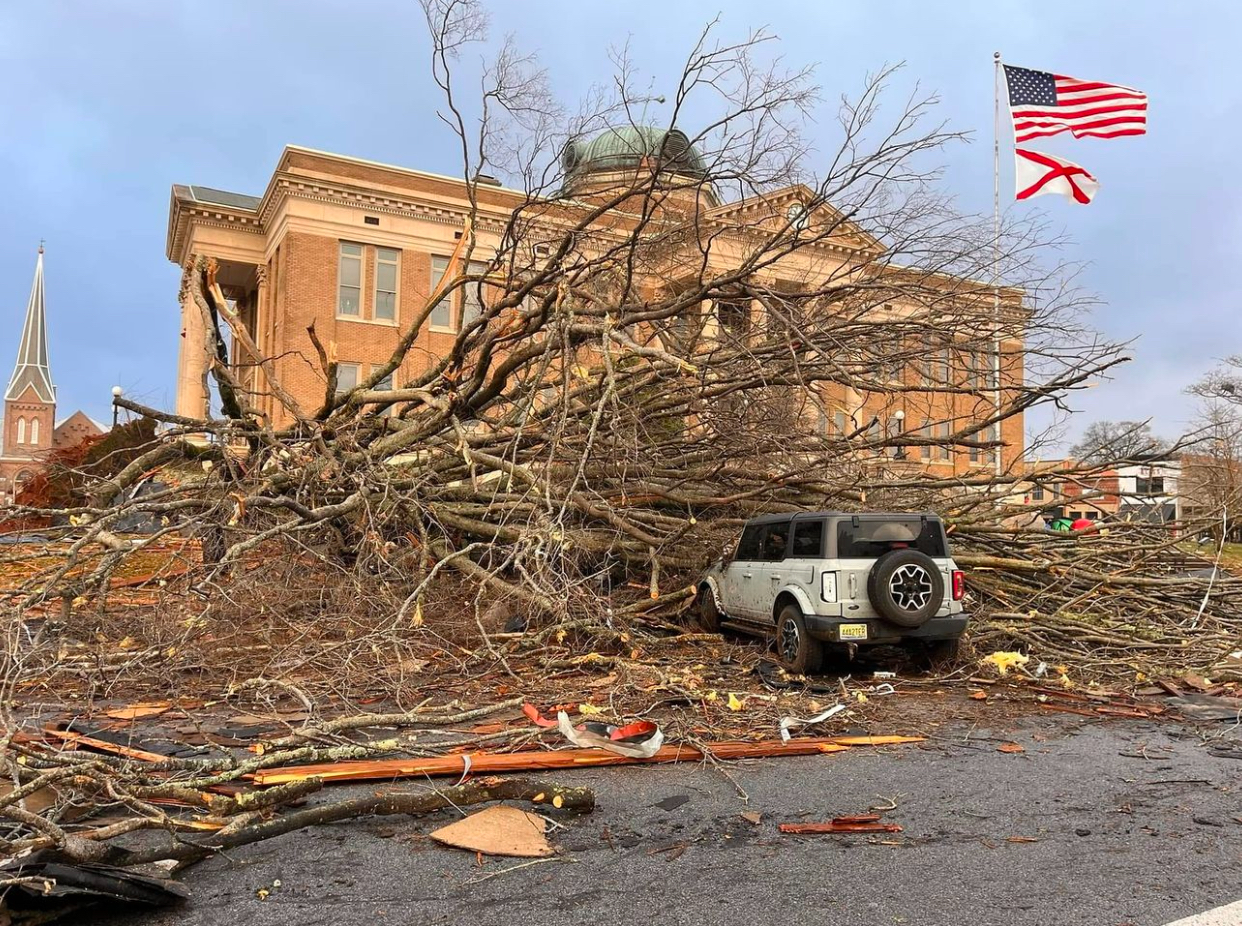
Fallen tree caused by the EF1 tornado

== Geography ==
Athens is midway between Nashville and Birmingham on Interstate 65. Athens shares a boundary with Huntsville.

According to the U.S. Census Bureau, the city has a total area of 39.4 square miles (102 km^{2}), of which 39.3 square miles (102 km^{2}) is land and 0.1 square miles (0.26 km^{2}) (0.23%) is water.

=== Climate ===
The climate in this area is characterized by hot, humid summers and generally cool winters. According to the Köppen climate classification system, Athens has a humid subtropical climate, abbreviated "Cfa" on climate maps.

Climate data for Athens, Alabama (1991–2020, extremes 1991–present)
Month	Jan	Feb	Mar	Apr	May	Jun	Jul	Aug	Sep	Oct	Nov	Dec	Year
Record high °F (°C)	78 (26)	84 (29)	87 (31)	91 (33)	94 (34)	104 (40)	102 (39)	104 (40)	100 (38)	102 (39)	87 (31)	78 (26)	104 (40)
Mean maximum °F (°C)	68.9 (20.5)	73.5 (23.1)	81.2 (27.3)	85.7 (29.8)	90.3 (32.4)	95.1 (35.1)	96.0 (35.6)	96.7 (35.9)	93.8 (34.3)	88.6 (31.4)	77.2 (25.1)	72.3 (22.4)	98.8 (37.1)
Mean daily maximum °F (°C)	51.3 (10.7)	55.9 (13.3)	64.5 (18.1)	73.3 (22.9)	80.4 (26.9)	87.1 (30.6)	89.9 (32.2)	89.8 (32.1)	84.9 (29.4)	74.7 (23.7)	63.0 (17.2)	54.2 (12.3)	72.4 (22.4)
Daily mean °F (°C)	42.4 (5.8)	46.3 (7.9)	54.0 (12.2)	62.3 (16.8)	70.4 (21.3)	77.8 (25.4)	81.0 (27.2)	80.3 (26.8)	74.7 (23.7)	63.7 (17.6)	52.4 (11.3)	45.4 (7.4)	62.6 (17.0)
Mean daily minimum °F (°C)	33.5 (0.8)	36.7 (2.6)	43.5 (6.4)	51.3 (10.7)	60.4 (15.8)	68.4 (20.2)	72.1 (22.3)	70.9 (21.6)	64.5 (18.1)	52.6 (11.4)	41.9 (5.5)	36.5 (2.5)	52.7 (11.5)
Mean minimum °F (°C)	14.5 (−9.7)	18.9 (−7.3)	25.9 (−3.4)	34.5 (1.4)	44.4 (6.9)	57.7 (14.3)	62.7 (17.1)	62.3 (16.8)	50.9 (10.5)	35.7 (2.1)	24.9 (−3.9)	21.7 (−5.7)	12.9 (−10.6)
Record low °F (°C)	0 (−18)	−1 (−18)	12 (−11)	23 (−5)	37 (3)	47 (8)	57 (14)	50 (10)	39 (4)	28 (−2)	16 (−9)	3 (−16)	−1 (−18)
Average precipitation inches (mm)	5.52 (140)	5.43 (138)	5.59 (142)	5.40 (137)	4.85 (123)	4.76 (121)	4.89 (124)	3.93 (100)	3.77 (96)	4.02 (102)	4.61 (117)	6.29 (160)	59.06 (1,500)
Average snowfall inches (cm)	0.5 (1.3)	0.5 (1.3)	0.3 (0.76)	0.0 (0.0)	0.0 (0.0)	0.0 (0.0)	0.0 (0.0)	0.0 (0.0)	0.0 (0.0)	0.0 (0.0)	0.0 (0.0)	0.0 (0.0)	1.3 (3.3)
Average precipitation days (≥ 0.01 in)	10.9	11.7	11.7	10.1	11.0	11.4	11.3	9.8	8.2	9.2	10.4	12.0	127.7
Average snowy days (≥ 0.1 in)	0.3	0.2	0.0	0.0	0.0	0.0	0.0	0.0	0.0	0.0	0.0	0.1	0.6
Source: NOAA (mean maxima/minima 2006–2020)

== Demographics ==
Athens first appeared on the 1850 U.S. Census as an incorporated place. It did not appear on the 1860 census, but returned again in 1870 and every census to date.

Historical population
Census	Pop.	Note	%±
1850	991		—
1870	887		—
1880	1,011		14.0%
1890	940		−7.0%
1900	1,010		7.4%
1910	1,715		69.8%
1920	3,323		93.8%
1930	4,238		27.5%
1940	4,342		2.5%
1950	6,309		45.3%
1960	9,330		47.9%
1970	14,360		53.9%
1980	14,558		1.4%
1990	16,901		16.1%
2000	18,967		12.2%
2010	21,897		15.4%
2020	25,406		16.0%
2025 (est.)	34,209	▲	34.6%
Sources: 1850; 1870 and 1880; 1900, 1910, and 1920; 1930, 1940, and 1950; 1960, 1970, and 1980; 1990; 2000 and 2010

=== Racial and ethnic composition ===
Athens city, Alabama – Racial and ethnic composition Note: the US Census treats Hispanic/Latino as an ethnic category. This table excludes Latinos from the racial categories and assigns them to a separate category. Hispanics/Latinos may be of any race.
Race / Ethnicity (NH = Non-Hispanic)	Pop 1980	Pop 1990	Pop 2000	Pop 2010	Pop 2020	% 1980	% 1990	% 2000	% 2010	% 2020
White alone (NH)	12,040	13,634	14,245	15,498	17,160	82.70%	80.67%	75.10%	70.78%	67.54%
Black or African American alone (NH)	2,450	3,030	3,436	3,805	4,275	16.83%	17.93%	18.12%	17.38%	16.83%
Native American or Alaska Native alone (NH)	15	50	70	98	74	0.10%	0.30%	0.37%	0.45%	0.29%
Asian alone (NH)	24	110	134	190	240	0.16%	0.65%	0.71%	0.87%	0.94%
Native Hawaiian or Pacific Islander alone (NH)	x	x	3	6	34	x	x	0.02%	0.03%	0.13%
Other race alone (NH)	0	0	4	29	90	0.00%	0.00%	0.02%	0.13%	0.35%
Mixed race or Multiracial (NH)	x	x	153	339	1,118	x	x	0.81%	1.55%	4.40%
Hispanic or Latino (any race)	29	77	922	1,932	2,415	0.20%	0.46%	4.86%	8.82%	9.51%
Total	14,558	16,901	18,967	21,897	25,406	100.00%	100.00%	100.00%	100.00%	100.00%

=== 2020 census ===
As of the 2020 census, Athens had a population of 25,406 living in 6,080 families. The median age was 41.3 years. 22.4% of residents were under the age of 18 and 20.1% of residents were 65 years of age or older. For every 100 females there were 88.9 males, and for every 100 females age 18 and over there were 86.3 males age 18 and over.

87.3% of residents lived in urban areas, while 12.7% lived in rural areas.

There were 10,407 households in Athens, of which 29.3% had children under the age of 18 living in them. Of all households, 45.5% were married-couple households, 17.1% were households with a male householder and no spouse or partner present, and 33.3% were households with a female householder and no spouse or partner present. About 32.1% of all households were made up of individuals and 14.7% had someone living alone who was 65 years of age or older.

There were 11,279 housing units, of which 7.7% were vacant. The homeowner vacancy rate was 2.0% and the rental vacancy rate was 5.8%.

=== 2010 census ===
As of the census of 2010, there were 21,897 people, 9,038 households, and 5,881 families residing in the city. The population density was 557.2 inhabitants per square mile (215.1/km^{2}). There were 9,862 housing units at an average density of 250.9 per square mile (96.9/km^{2}). The racial makeup of the city was 73.0% White, 17.5% Black or African American, 0.6% Native American, 0.9% Asian, 0.1% Pacific Islander, 5.9% from other races, and 1.9% from two or more races. 8.8% of the population were Hispanic or Latino of any race.

There were 9,038 households, of which 27.7% had children under the age of 18 living with them, 47.5% were married couples living together, 13.7% had a female householder with no husband present, and 34.9% were non-families. 31.2% of all households were made up of individuals, and 12.4% had someone living alone who was 65 years of age or older. The average household size was 2.36 and the average family size was 2.96.

In the city, the age distribution of the population showed 22.8% under the age of 18, 8.8% from 18 to 24, 26.0% from 25 to 44, 26.2% from 45 to 64, and 16.2% who were 65 years of age or older. The median age was 39.2 years. For every 100 females, there were 91.4 males. For every 100 females age 18 and over, there were 95.7 males.

The median income for a household in the city of Athens was $42,127, and the median income for a family was $54,013. Males had a median income of $43,672 versus $31,601 for females. The per capita income for the city was $26,136. About 15.5% of families and 17.5% of the population were below the poverty line, including 26.4% of those under age 45 and 8.5% of those age 65 or over.

=== 2000 census ===
As of the census of 2000, there were 18,967 people, 7,742 households, and 5,140 families residing in the city. The population density was 482.3 inhabitants per square mile (186.2/km^{2}). There were 8,449 housing units at an average density of 214.8 per square mile (82.9/km^{2}). The racial makeup of the city was 77.72% White, 18.26% Black or African American, 0.40% Native American, 0.71% Asian, 0.02% Pacific Islander, 1.92% from other races, and 0.97% from two or more races. 4.86% of the population were Hispanic or Latino of any race.

There were 7,742 households, of which 30.5% had children under the age of 18 living with them, 50.0% were married couples living together, 13.0% had a female householder with no husband present, and 33.6% were non-families. 31.0% of all households were made up of individuals, and 13.2% had someone living alone who was 65 years of age or older. The average household size was 2.37 and the average family size was 2.97.

In the city, the age distribution of the population showed 23.9% under the age of 18, 9.3% from 18 to 24, 28.4% from 25 to 44, 22.5% from 45 to 64, and 15.8% who were 65 years of age or older. The median age was 38 years. For every 100 females, there were 89.8 males. For every 100 females age 18 and over, there were 85.5 males.

The median income for a household in the city of Athens was $33,980, and the median income for a family was $44,544. Males had a median income of $37,191 versus $22,748 for females. The per capita income for the city was $19,315. About 13.7% of families and 16.3% of the population were below the poverty line, including 21.2% of those under age 45 and 10.8% of those age 65 or over.

== Athens Precinct/Division (1870–) ==
Historical population
Census	Pop.	Note	%±
1870	2,618		—
1890	3,099		—
1900	3,333		7.6%
1910	4,811		44.3%
1920	6,848		42.3%
1930	9,342		36.4%
1940	9,247		−1.0%
1950	11,137		20.4%
1960	15,180		36.3%
1970	14,607		−3.8%
1980	40,056		174.2%
1990	47,930		19.7%
2000	57,830		20.7%
2010	69,761		20.6%
U.S. Decennial Census

Athens, the 1st Beat/Precinct of Limestone County first reported on the 1870 U.S. Census. This included both the town/city of Athens and the surrounding area. It did not report a figure for 1880, but returned in 1890 and every census to date. In 1870, when racial demographics were reported, it had a Black majority in that beat. In 1960, Athens precinct was changed to a census division as part of a general reorganization of counties. By the 2020 census, the Athens precinct was split into several pieces as part of a new redrawing of precinct lines in Limestone County, and since 2020 has been split between the 1st, 3rd, and 4th precincts of Limestone County.

== Transportation ==
- I-65
- US 31
- US 72
- Norfolk Southern Railway
- CSX Transportation railroad
- Pryor Field Regional Airport (regional/municipal airport)

Intercity bus service is provided by Greyhound Lines.

== Education ==
* Athens City Schools
- Athens State University

== Media ==
- The News Courier, daily newspaper
- WVNN 770 AM
- WKAC 1080 AM
- WZYP 104.3 FM
- WTZT-CD TV channel 11

== Notable people ==
- Woody Abernathy, former professional baseball outfielder
- Sheila Andrews, country music singer
- Bill Arnsparger, defensive coordinator in the National Football League (NFL) for Miami Dolphins teams that won consecutive Super Bowls (1972 and 1973); head coach of the LSU Tigers football team
- Keith Askins, NBA assistant coach, former player Miami Heat
- Don Black, KKK Grand Wizard
- Reed Blankenship, NFL safety, for the Philadelphia Eagles
- Michael Boley, NFL outside linebacker New York Giants
- George Ruffin Bridgeforth, professor Tuskegee Institute, first Black alumnus of University of Massachusetts Amherst
- Wally Bullington, head football coach for Abilene Christian University 1968–1976
- Tom Calvin, former NFL halfback
- Dick Coffman, former Major League Baseball player
- Slick Coffman, former Major League Baseball player
- Billy Davis, former member of the Arizona State Senate
- P. O. Davis, early radio pioneer, agricultural editor and Alabama Cooperative Extension Service educator and administrator
- Anderson East, R&B singer who is featured on the Fifty Shades Darker soundtrack
- Richard Hendrix, professional basketball player
- Jake Hess, Grammy Award-winning southern gospel singer
- George S. Houston, Governor of Alabama 1874-1878 and U.S. Senator from Alabama 1879
- Brittany Howard, singer and guitarist with Alabama Shakes
- C. Eric Lincoln, African-American scholar
- Patti J. Malone, noted African-American mezzo-soprano singer
- Bobby Marlow, former Canadian Football League running back
- John Mason Martin, U.S. representative 1885–1887
- Mitch McConnell, U.S. senator from Kentucky, lived in Athens 1942–1950
- Alfred McCullough, American football player
- Kevin Miller, radio talk show host
- Jessie Murph, singer
- Roger Murrah, songwriter
- Andy Nelson, former safety for the Baltimore Colts and New York Giants
- Edmund Pettus, lawyer, soldier, and U.S. senator 1897–1907
- Luke Pryor, served as a U.S. senator in 1880, and as a U.S. representative 1883–1885
- Wayne Redmond, former baseball player for the Detroit Tigers
- William N. Richardson, U.S. representative 1900–1914
- Philip Rivers, NFL quarterback, San Diego Chargers
- Charles Henry Sykes, editorial cartoonist
- Charles Coleman Thach, president of Auburn University 1902–1920
- Alice Vassar LaCour, Fisk Jubilee singer and teacher
- Lee Vickers, professional football player for the Omaha Nighthawks
- James C. Watkins, ceramic artist
- Quez Watkins, professional football player
- Henry A. White, Alabama educator and state representative; served on the Athens City Council
- Pryor Williams, former professional football player

== In popular culture ==
Athens was the primary filming location of Brittany Howard's "Stay High" music video.

== Gallery ==
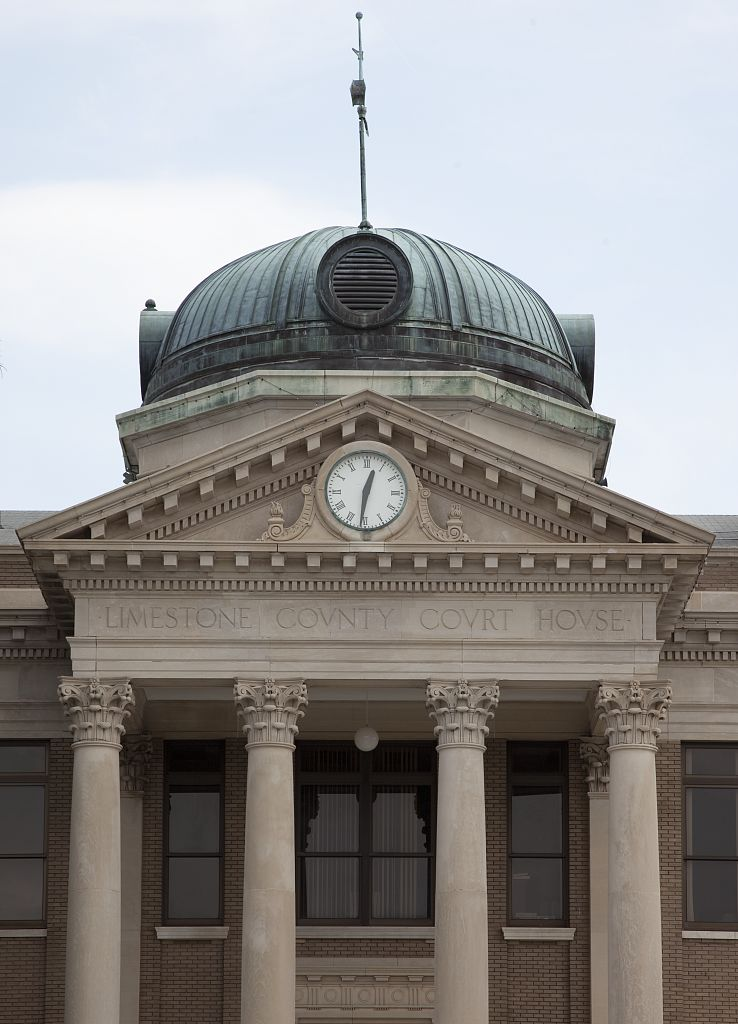
Limestone County Courthouse, Athens

Downtown Athens

Downtown Athens

Downtown Athens

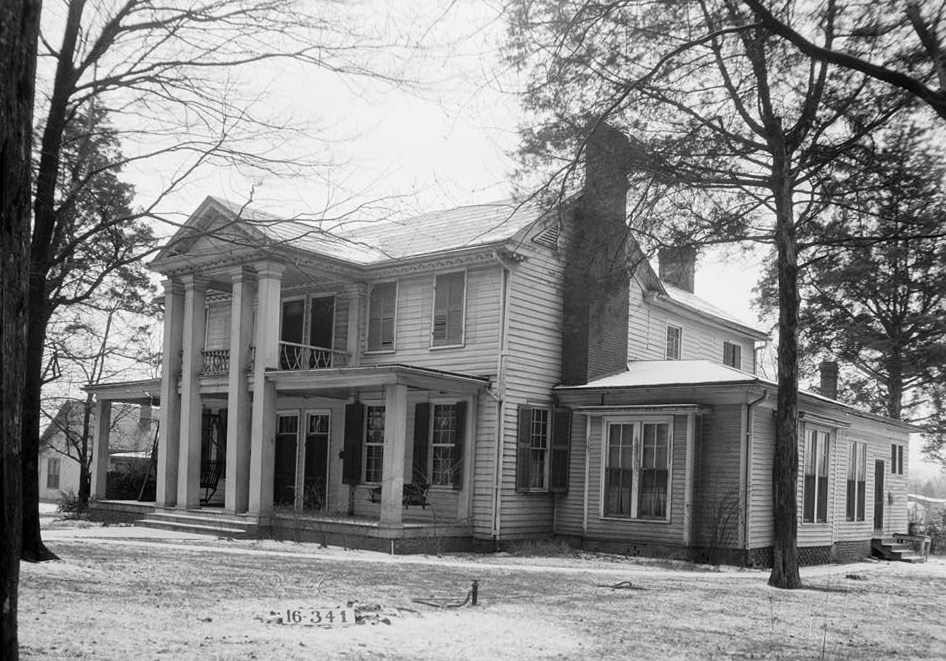
Governor George S. Houston House

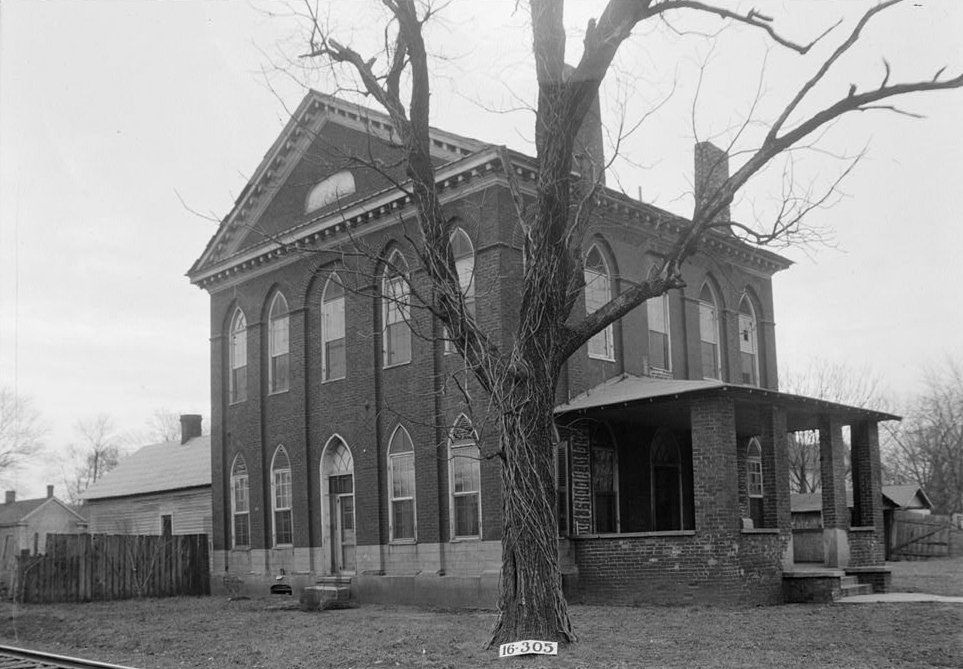
Masonic Hall

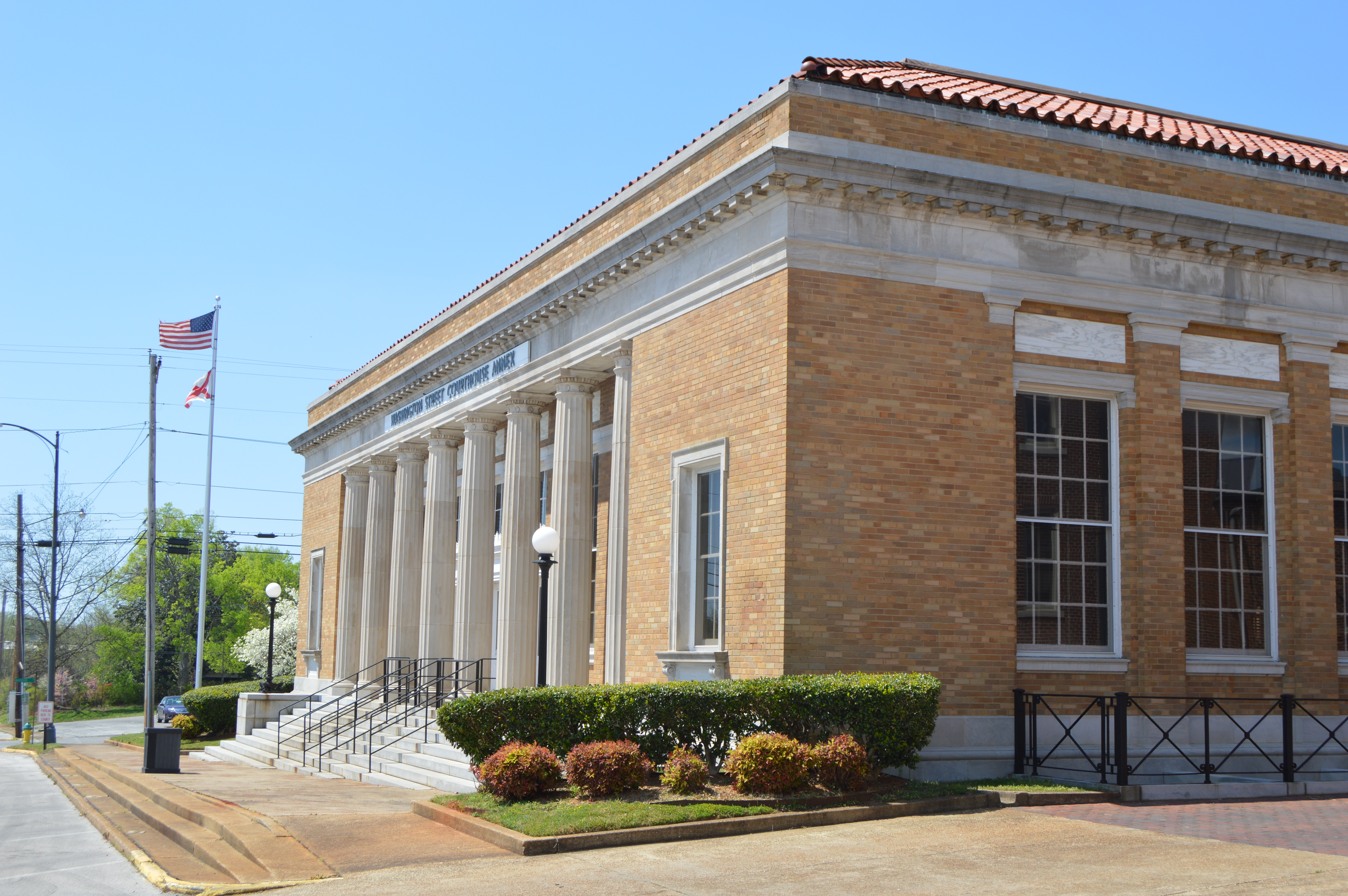
Former post office

Confederate soldiers monument, Athens

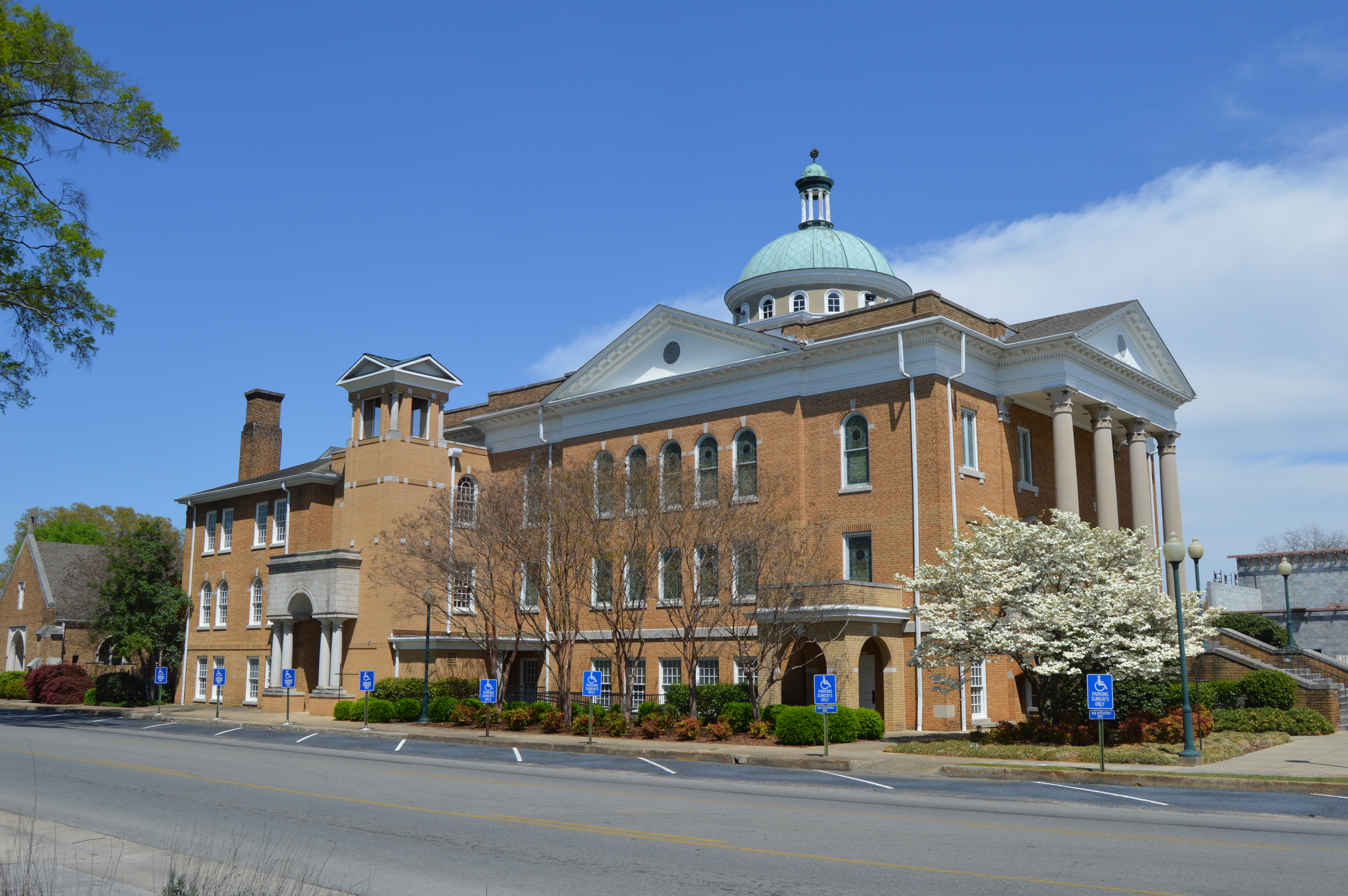
First Methodist Church

"Sacked and Plundered" historic sign

Presbyterian Church, Athens

Limestone Drug building

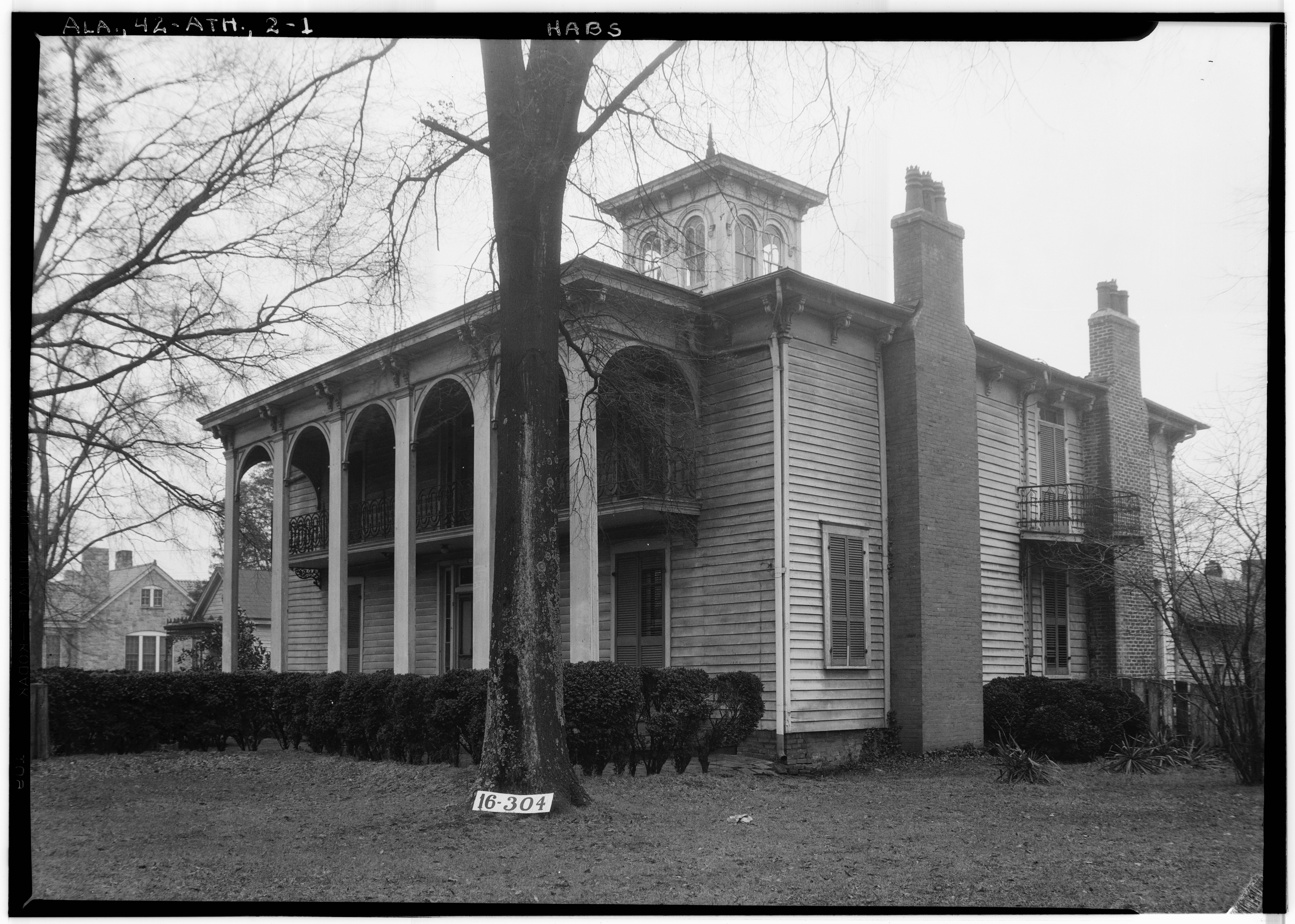
Frances Snow Pryor House

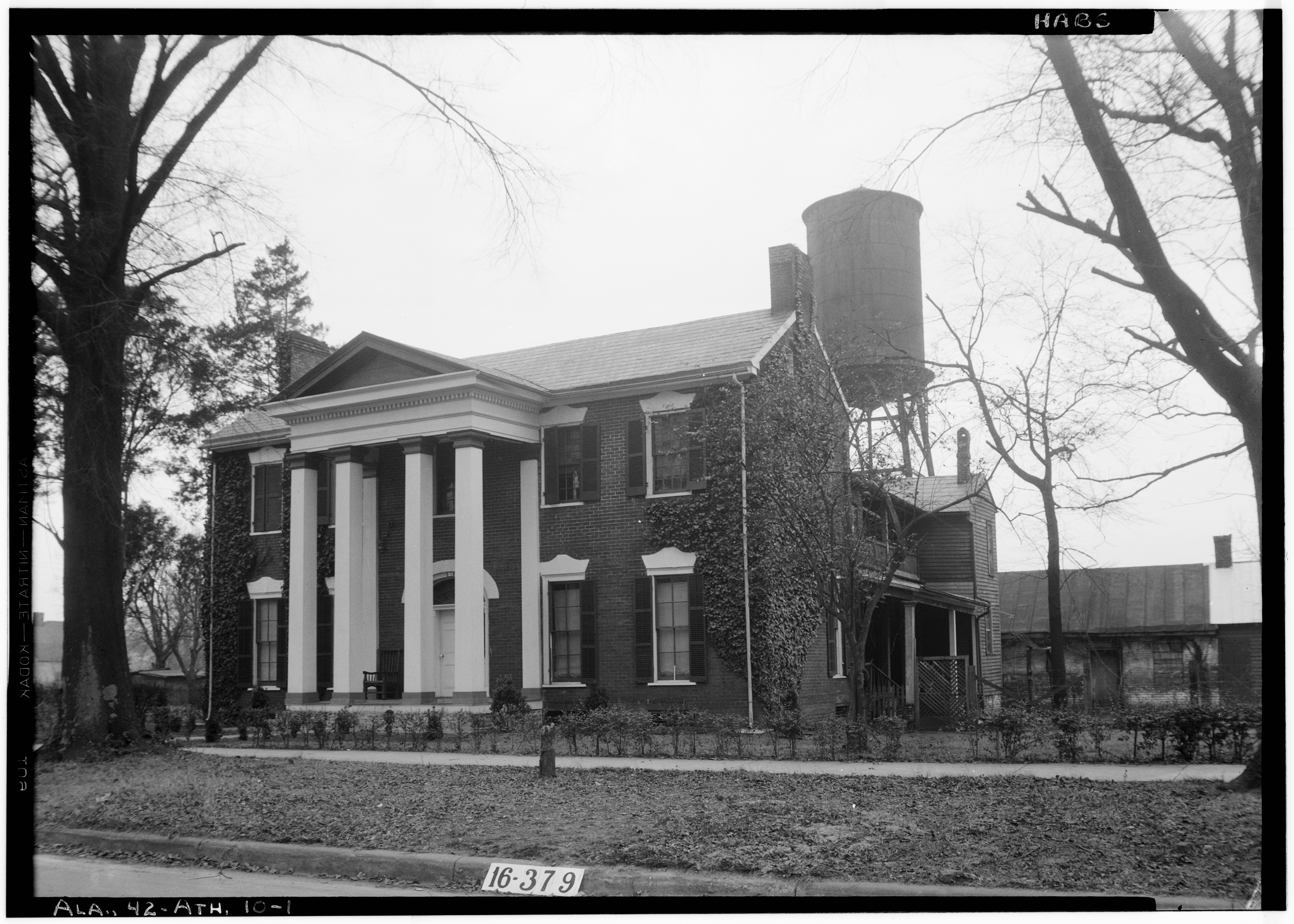
Vining-Wood-Vasser House

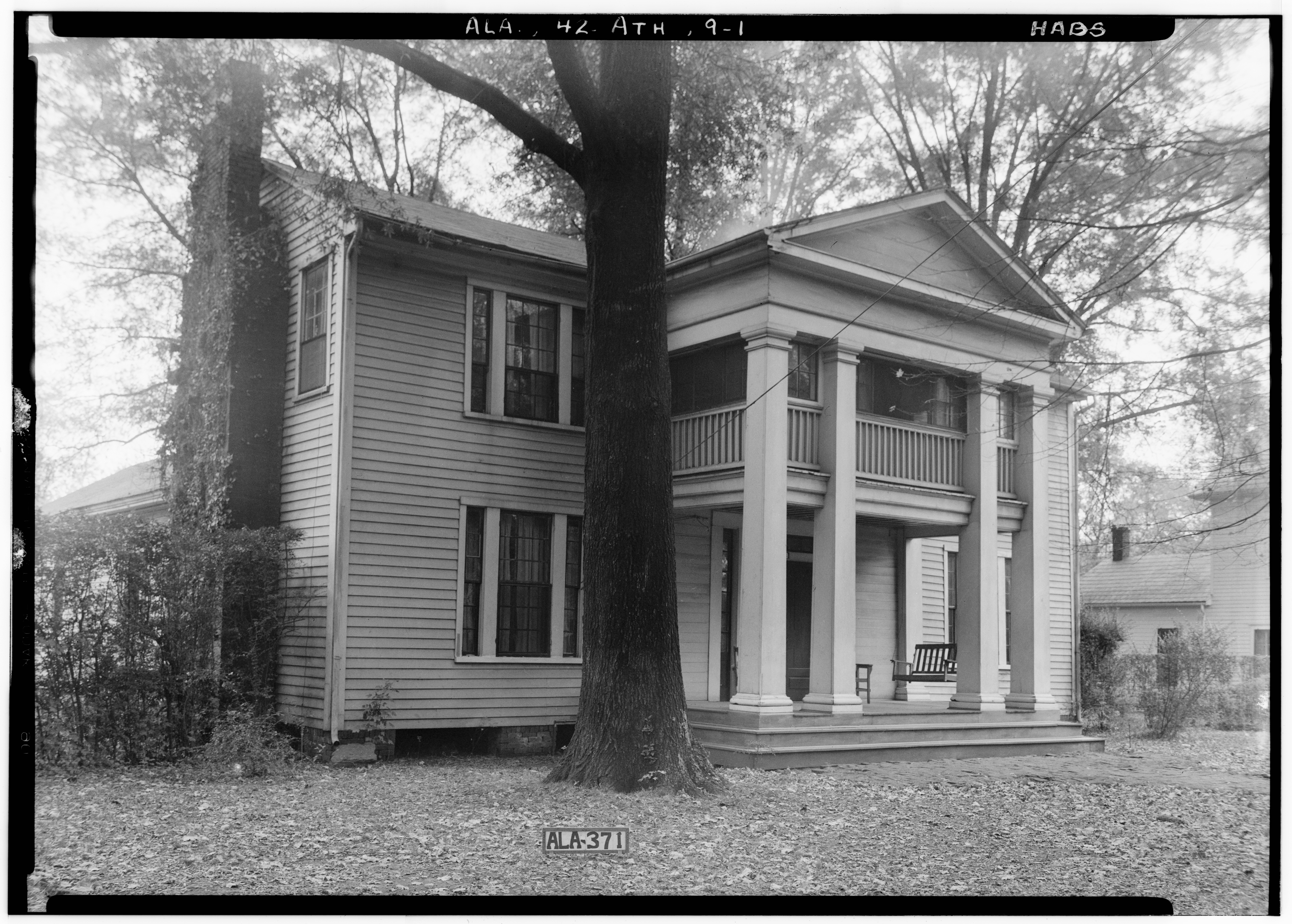
Judge William Harrison Walker House

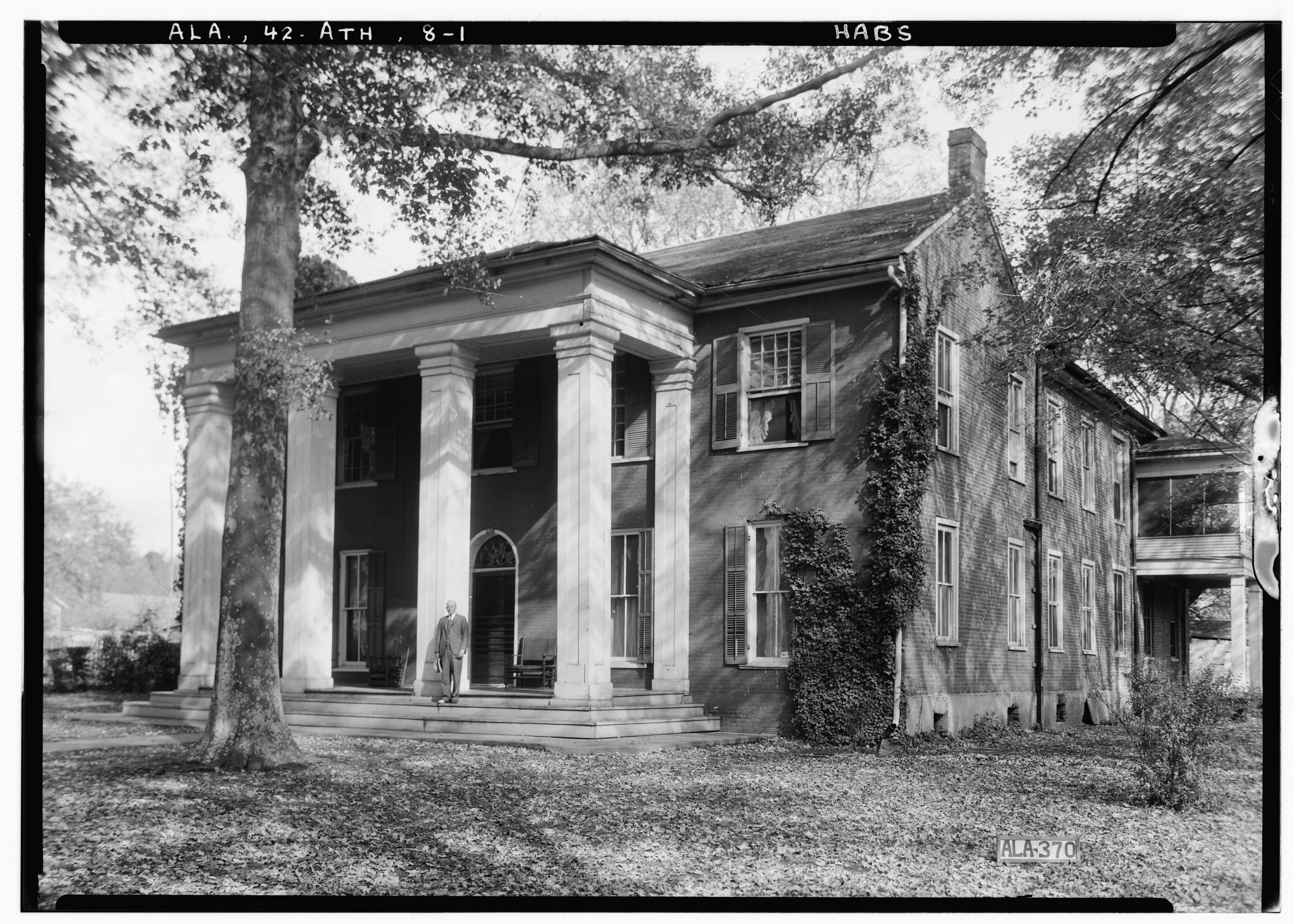
Dr. R. H. Richardson House

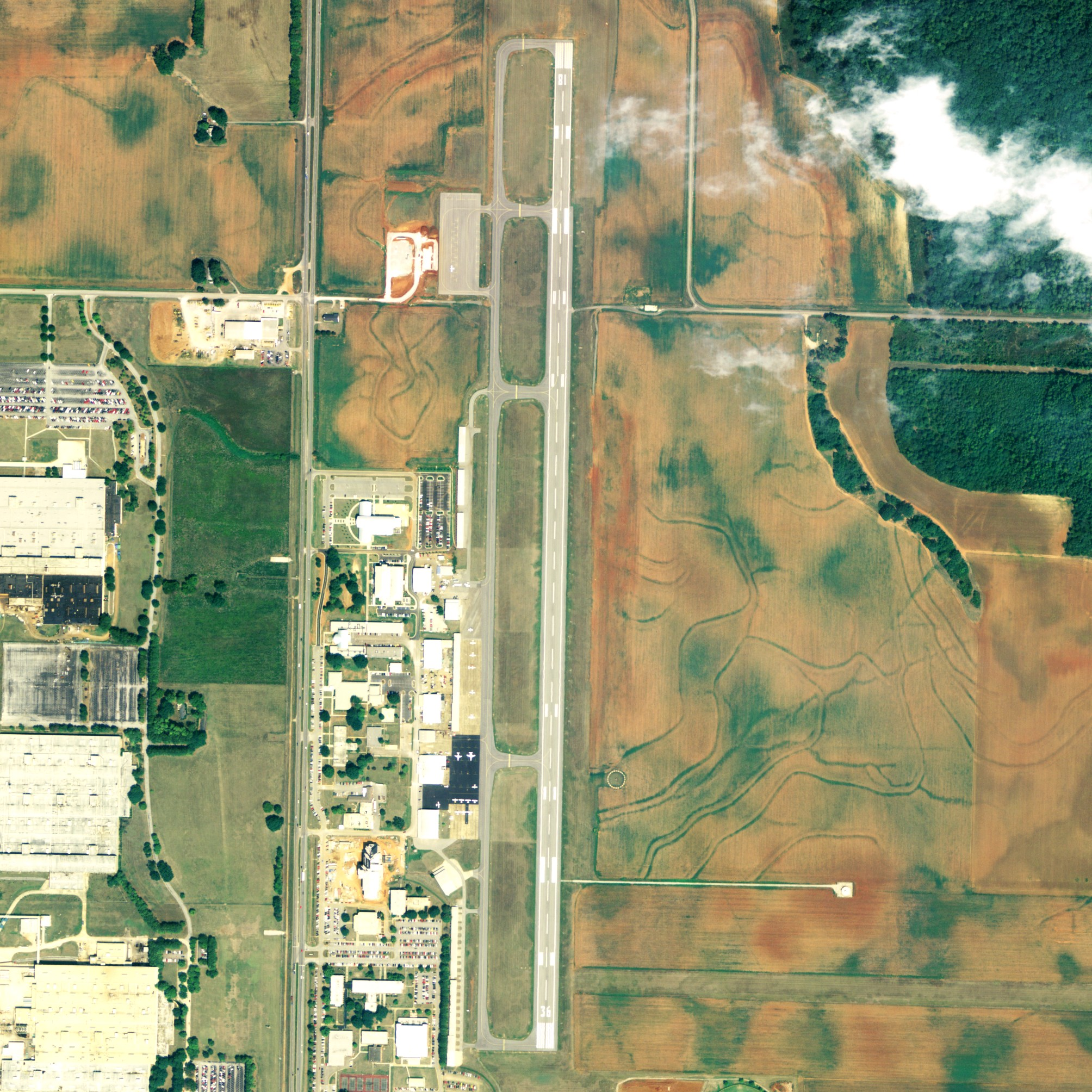
Pryor Field Regional Airport

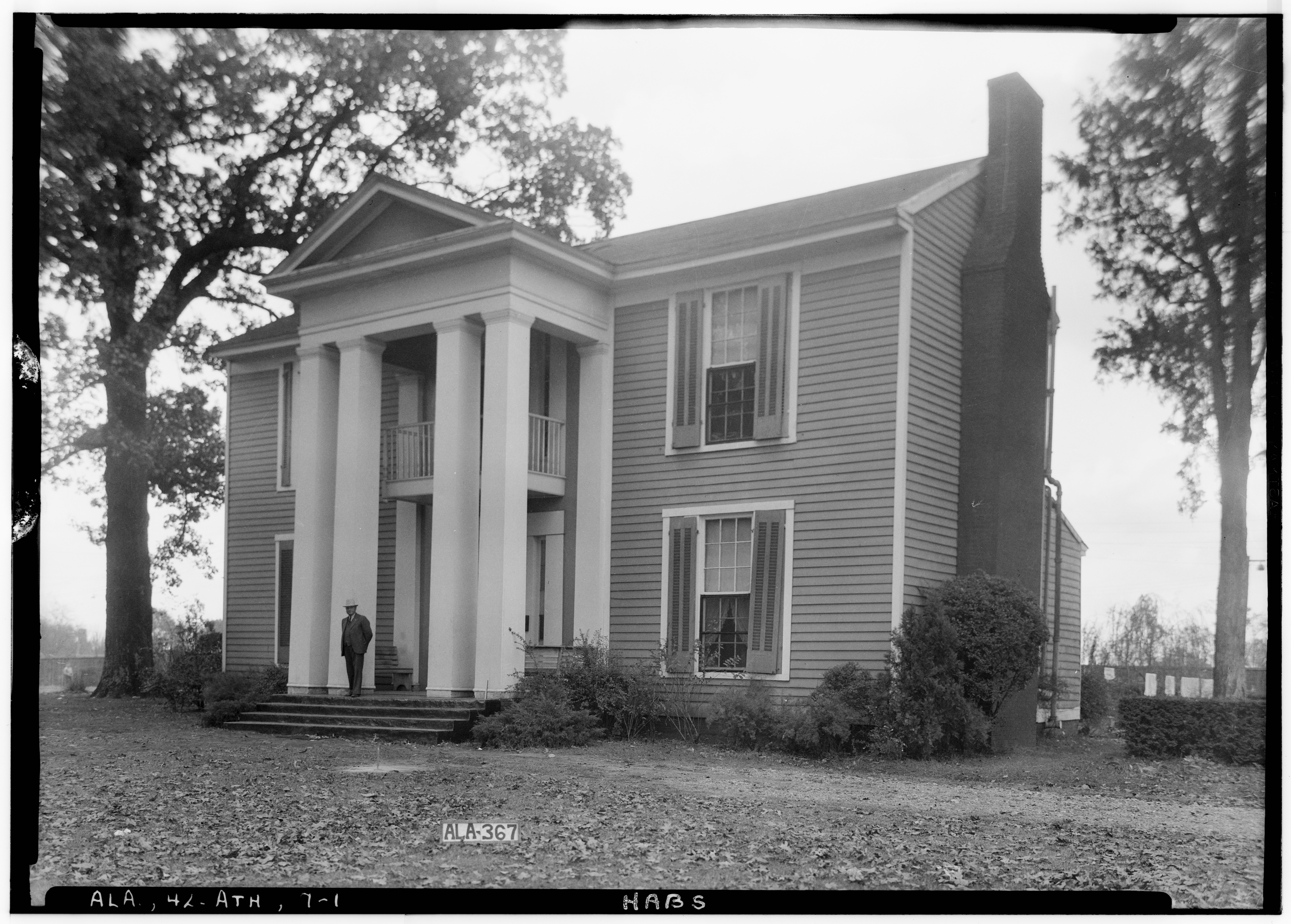
Father Robert Donnell House
