= List of Fisk University alumni =

Following is a list of notable alumni from Fisk University.

Name	Class year	Notability	Reference(s)
Lil Hardin Armstrong	1915	jazz pianist/composer, second wife of Louis Armstrong	
Marion Barry	1960	former mayor of Washington, D.C.	
Mary Frances Berry		former chair, United States Commission on Civil Rights; former chancellor, University of Colorado at Boulder	
John Betsch	1967	jazz percussionist	
Otis Boykin	1942	inventor, control device for the heart pacemaker	
St. Elmo Brady		first African-American to earn a doctorate in Chemistry	
Virginia E. Walker Broughton	1875, 1878	author and Baptist missionary	
Cora Brown		first African-American woman elected to a state senate	
James Dallas Burrus	1875	educator	
John Houston Burrus	1875	educator	
June Dobbs Butts		educator, writer, and sex therapist	
Henry Alvin Cameron	1896	educator, decorated World War I veteran	
Elizabeth Hortense (Golden) Canady		past national president of Delta Sigma Theta sorority	
Alfred O. Coffin		first African-American to earn a doctorate in zoology	
Malia Cohen	2001	San Francisco District 10 supervisor 2010–present	
Johnnetta B. Cole		anthropologist, former president of Spelman College and Bennett College	
Neal Craig	1971	NFL cornerback for Cincinnati Bengals, Buffalo Bills, and Cleveland Browns	
Minnie Lee Crosthwaite		community organizer, women's activist, and social worker	
Minnie Lou Crosthwaite		teacher, college administrator, activist	
Arthur Cunningham	1951	musical composer, studied at Juilliard and Columbia University	
William L. Dawson	1909	U.S. congressman (1943–1970)	
Mahala Ashley Dickerson	1935	first black female attorney in the state of Alabama and first black president of the National Association of Women Lawyers	
Charles Diggs		member of United States House of Representatives, Michigan (1955–1980)	
Rel Dowdell	1993	filmmaker	
W. E. B. Du Bois	1888	sociologist, scholar, first African-American to earn a PhD from Harvard	
James J. Durham	1880, 1885	founder of Morris College	
Althea Brown Edmiston	1901	Presbyterian missionary in Belgian Congo	
Venida Evans	1969	actress, best known for IKEA commercials	
Etta Zuber Falconer	1953	first African-American woman to receive a PhD in mathematics; former chair, mathematics department at Spelman College	
Lemuel L. Foster	1910s	community leader in Harlem, New York City, civil servant, and business executive; member of the Fisk Jubilee Singers	
John Hope Franklin	1935	historian, professor, scholar, author of landmark text From Slavery to Freedom	
Victor O. Frazer		United States House of Representatives (1995–1997)	
Alonzo Fulgham		former acting chief and operating officer of the United States Agency for International Development (USAID)	
Vivian Gadsden	1978	psychologist at University of Pennsylvania	
Nikki Giovanni	1967	poet, author, professor, scholar	
Eliza Atkins Gleason	1930	founding dean of the Atlanta University School of Library Service; first African-American to earn a Ph.D. in Library Science	
Louis George Gregory		posthumously, a Hand of the Cause in Bahá'í Faith	
Eliza Ann Grier	1891	first African-American female physician in Georgia	
Alcee Hastings		U.S. congressman and former U.S. district court judge	
Roland Hayes		concert singer	
Perry Wilbon Howard		assistant U.S. attorney general under President Herbert Hoover	
Elmer Imes	1903	physicist and second African-American to earn a PhD in Physics	
Jedidah Isler	2007	became first African-American woman to receive a PhD in Astrophysics from Yale University in 2014	
Esther Cooper Jackson	1940	founding editor of Freedomways journal	
Lena Terrell Jackson	1885	educator in Nashville for over 50 years	
Leonard Jackson	1952	actor, Five on the Black Hand Side; The Color Purple	
Robert James		former NFL all-pro cornerback	
Judith Jamison		dancer and choreographer; former artistic director, Alvin Ailey American Dance Theater	
Ben Jobe	1956	legendary basketball coach, Southern University	
Ella Mae Johnson	1921	at age 105, traveled to Washington, DC to attend the inauguration of Barack Obama	
Joyce Johnson	1953	organist and professor emerita of music at Spelman College in Atlanta	
Lewis Wade Jones	1931	sociologist; Julius Rosenwald Foundation fellow at Columbia University	
Mame Stewart Josenberger	1888	businesswoman and club woman in Arkansas	
Anne Gamble Kennedy	1941	pianist, professor, and piano accompanist for the Fisk Jubilee Singers	
Matthew Kennedy	1947	pianist, professor, and former director of the Fisk Jubilee Singers	
Mathew Knowles	1974	father and former manager of Beyoncé, founder and owner of Music World Entertainment, and adjunct professor at Texas Southern University	
Nella Larsen	1908	novelist, Harlem Renaissance era	
Helen Shores Lee	1962	Judge for 10th Judicial Circuit of Alabama	
John Angelo Lester	1895	professor emeritus of Physiology, Meharry Medical College	
Julius Lester	1960	author of children's books and former professor at the University of Massachusetts Amherst	
David Levering Lewis	1956	two-time Pulitzer Prize winner	
John Lewis	1967	congressman, civil rights activist, former president of Student Nonviolent Coordinating Committee (SNCC)	
Hettie Simmons Love	1943	first African-American to earn an MBA at the Wharton School of Business at the University of Pennsylvania	
Jimmie Lunceford	1925	bandleader in the swing era	
Aubrey Lyles	1903	vaudeville performer	
Hugh Ellwood Macbeth Sr.	1905	civil rights attorney who fought against the incarceration of Japanese Americans	
Ariana Austin Makonnen		philanthropist and member of the Ethiopian imperial family	
Patti J. Malone	1880	member of Fisk Jubilee Singers	
Mandisa	2001	Grammy Award-winning and Dove Award-nominated Christian contemporary singer/songwriter, ninth-place finalist in the fifth season (2006) of American Idol	
Louis E. Martin	1933	"godfather of Black politics"	
Fatima Massaquoi	1936	Liberian educator	
Wade H. McCree	1941	second African-American United States solicitor general; justice, U.S. Court of Appeals for the Sixth Circuit	
Samuel A. McElwee	1883	state senator during the Reconstruction Era; first African-American elected three times to the Tennessee General Assembly	
Robert McFerrin		first African-American man to sing at the Metropolitan Opera; father of Bobby McFerrin	
Leslie Meek	1987	administrative law judge; wife of Congressman Kendrick Meek	
Theo Mitchell	1960	Senator, South Carolina General Assembly	
Lewis Baxter Moore		classicist, scholar, university teacher, and minister	
Undine Smith Moore		first Fisk graduate to receive a scholarship to Juilliard, Pulitzer Prize Nominee	
Constance Baker Motley	1941–1942	first African-American woman elected to the New York State Senate	
Diane Nash		founding member of SNCC	
Rachel B. Noel		politician; first African-American to serve on the Denver Public Schools Board of Education	
Hon. Hazel O'Leary		former U.S. secretary of Energy	
J. O. Patterson Jr.	1958	first African-American mayor of Memphis; Tennessee state representative, state senator, Memphis councilman, jurisdictional bishop in the Church of God in Christ	
Helen Phillips	1928	first African-American to perform with the Metropolitan Opera Chorus	
Annette Lewis Phinazee	1939	first black woman to earn a doctorate in library sciences from Columbia University	
Alma Powell		audiologist and wife of Gen. Colin Powell	
Louis W. Roberts	1913	microwave physicist, chief of the Microwave Laboratory at NASA's Electronics Research Center and director of the United States Department of Transportation's John A. Volpe National Transportation Systems Center	
Cecelia Cabaniss Saunders	1903	director of Harlem YWCA, 1914–1947	
Lorenzo Dow Turner	1910	linguist and chair, African Studies at Roosevelt University	
A. Maceo Walker	1930	businessman, Universal Life Insurance, Tri-State Bank	
Ron Walters	1963	scholar of African-American politics, chair, Afro-American Studies Brandeis University	
Margaret Murray Washington	1890	lady principal of Tuskegee Institute and third wife of Booker T. Washington	
Teresa N. Washington	1993	academic, author, activist	
Ida B. Wells		civil rights activist and women's suffrage advocate	
Charles H. Wesley	1911	president of Wilberforce University 1942–1947; president of Central State College 1947–1965; third African-American to receive a PhD from Harvard	
Kym Whitley		actress, comedian	
Frederica Wilson	1963	U.S. representative for Florida's 17th congressional district	
Tom Wilson	1953	music producer, best known for his work with Bob Dylan and Frank Zappa	
Frank Yerby	1938	first African-American to publish a best-selling novel	

== See also ==
- Category:Fisk University alumni
