= Minnie L. Crosthwaite =

Minnie L. Crosthwait may refer to:

- Minnie Lee Crosthwaite (née Harris; 1872–1963) American community organizer, women's activist, and social worker
- Minnie Lou Crosthwaite (née Scott; August 20, 1860 – January 13, 1937) American teacher
