= Nina Gamble Kennedy =

American classical pianist, orchestral conductor, film-maker and writer (born 1960)

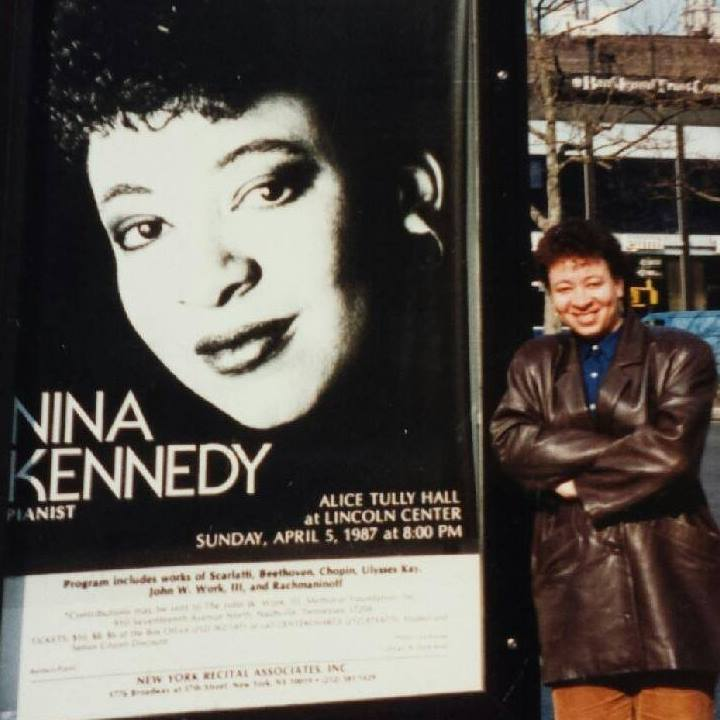
- Born: 1960 (age 65–66); Nashville, Tennessee, U.S.
- Occupations: Classical pianist; orchestra conductor; film director; writer
- Parents: Matthew Washington Kennedy (father); Anne Gamble Kennedy (mother)

Nina Gamble Kennedy (born 1960) is an American classical pianist, orchestral conductor, filmmaker, and writer.

== Early life ==
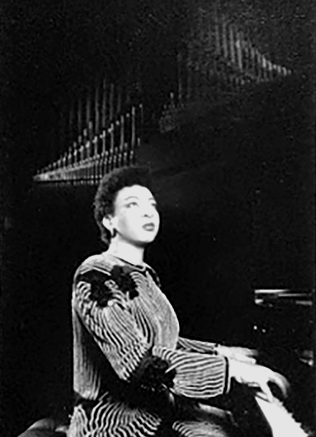
Nina Kennedy, pianist

Born in Nashville, Tennessee, Kennedy received her first musical instruction from her parents. She is the daughter of Matthew Washington Kennedy, concert pianist and director of the Fisk Jubilee Singers from 1957 to 1986; and Anne Gamble Kennedy, also a concert pianist and piano accompanist for the Fisk Jubilee Singers. Both of her parents served as members of the piano faculty at Fisk University.

She was enrolled in formal piano classes at the Blair Academy of Music in 1968, first with William Higgs, and later with Enid Katahn who would be her primary piano teacher until 1978. A child prodigy, she was presented in her first complete piano recital at nine years old. In 1974 she was engaged by conductor Thor Johnson to appear as piano soloist with the Nashville Symphony in a performance of George Gershwin's Rhapsody in Blue in Nashville's Centennial Park. She received a standing ovation from an audience of over 4,000. Kennedy graduated from McGavock High School in 1978. That year she was one of three piano students out of a field of 72 pianists who auditioned, accepted for study at the Curtis Institute of Music in Philadelphia, Pennsylvania, where she studied with Eleanor Sokoloff. At the time, famed African-American pianist Natalie Hinderas was on the piano faculty at Temple University. Kennedy began to study with her in 1979, and graduated with a Bachelor of Music degree from Temple in 1982 cum laude. From 1979 to 1982, Kennedy served on the piano faculty at the Settlement Music School in Philadelphia. She also taught several private piano students, and continued to teach privately after her arrival in New York. After her graduation from Temple, Kennedy was accepted for study in the Master's Program at the Juilliard School in New York City, where she majored in piano performance and orchestral conducting. Her second year at Juilliard she was awarded the prestigious William Petschek Scholarship. While at Juilliard she studied with William Masselos and Herbert Stessin. Throughout her studies, Kennedy had performed and participated in master classes conducted by André Watts, Gaby Casadesus, Leon Fleisher, and Leonard Bernstein at Juilliard. She completed the coursework toward the Doctor of Musical Arts degree at the Manhattan School of Music where she studied with Constance Keene. In 1988 she was the winner of the National Endowment of the Arts Solo Recitalist Fellowship.

== Career ==
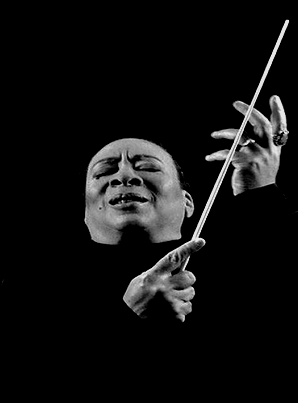
Nina Kennedy, conductor

On April 5, 1987, the John Wesley Work III Memorial Foundation presented Kennedy in her New York debut recital in Alice Tully Hall at Lincoln Center, for which she received several standing ovations and was called back for encores. John Rockwell of The New York Times reviewed the concert.

After Kennedy's New York debut, she embarked on her second European tour which included concerts in London, Edinburgh, Glasgow, Brussels, and Amsterdam at the Concertgebouw, for which she received several standing ovations and was reviewed by famed music critic Jan van Voorthuysen for Het Vaderland. Kennedy's television and radio broadcasts include a recital for the BBC in London, performances of the Beethoven Second Piano Concerto with the Jackson (Mississippi) Symphony for WNET (1976), and the Rachmaninoff Second Piano Concerto with the Chautauqua Festival Orchestra recorded live for broadcast on National Public Radio (1981). During her first European tour, she was invited by United States Ambassador to France Joe Rodgers to appear in recital at the American Embassy in Paris. She has appeared as guest soloist in the opening night concert for the Jeunesse Musicalisches Festival at Vienna's Musikverein, and as piano soloist with the Chicago Sinfonietta under conductor Paul Freeman at the Konzerthaus in Vienna. In 1995 Kennedy was invited by United States Ambassador to the Czech Republic Jenonne R. Walker to appear in recital at the American Embassy in Prague. In 1996, Kennedy appeared as piano soloist with the Memphis Symphony Orchestra before a live audience of over 7,000, and a television audience of thousands more, in a concert which was part of the Memphis in May International Festival. The Olympic torch came through the stadium during the concert on its way to the Summer Olympic Games in Atlanta, Georgia, and Vice President Al Gore was present to receive the torch and light the Olympic cauldron.

In Europe, Kennedy performed and resided in Vienna (1997–2001), Cologne (2001–2003), and Paris (2003–2007). She served as conducting apprentice with the New York Philharmonic from 1992 to 1995, and the Orchestre National de France from 2003 to 2007, under Kurt Masur.

On April 5, 2017, Kennedy celebrated the thirtieth anniversary of her New York Debut by presenting a mini-recital at Steinway Hall in New York City.

Kennedy is the subject of a mini-documentary titled Portrait: An American Concert Pianist, produced for broadcast on PBS. In 2006, she directed and produced a feature-length documentary film about her father titled Matthew Kennedy: One Man's Journey, which won the prize for Best Film by a Black Filmmaker at the 2007 Nashville Film Festival (NaFF). Since 2016, Kennedy and her partner April Gibson have been hosting an Artists’ Salon in New York City. Their first public Salon, an INFEMNITY Production, was presented at Dixon Place in 2017, and was broadcast on Manhattan Neighborhood Network Television. She is the host of The Noshing with Nina Show produced by April Gibson, which is also broadcast on MNN, BRIC (Brooklyn Information and Culture Network), and Bronx Network. The show has won the 2021 B Free Award in the B Entertaining category, and the 2019 B Free Award in the 1st Amendment category.

Her first book, Practicing for Love: A Memoir, is a 2021 Lambda Literary Award finalist. Her second book of memoirs, Practice What You Preach, also published by RoseDog Books, was released in 2022.

== Critical reception ==
Writing in The New York Times, John Rockwell said of Kennedy's New York debut performance that, "Her playing was distinguished by its poetic thoughtfulness", and called her "a fine pianist".

== Recordings ==
- Chorale from Cantata BWV 147: "Jesu, Joy of Man's Desiring" by Johann Sebastian Bach, arranged by Myra Hess, Bösendorfer Salon, Vienna, Austria, 2019
- Prelude in F minor, Op. 32, No. 6, by Sergei Rachmaninoff, Bösendorfer Salon, Vienna, Austria, 2019
- "Widmung" by Robert Schumann, arranged by Franz Liszt, Bösendorfer Salon, Vienna, Austria, 2019
- "Blue White and Red" including portions of the Grieg Piano Concerto, and featuring rapper Nejma Nefertiti, Astoria Soundworks, New York, 2019
- "Do It for the Love" including portions of "Vissi d'arte" featuring soprano Lowri Marie and Nejma Nefertiti, Astoria Soundworks, New York, 2019
- Étude in C-sharp minor, Op. 25, No. 7, by Frédéric Chopin, Abbey Road Studios, London, 1993
- Mazurka in A minor, Op. 17, No. 4, by Frédéric Chopin, Abbey Road Studios, London, 1993
- Rhapsody in Blue by George Gershwin, Abbey Road Studios, London, 1993
- Prelude in G-sharp minor, Op. 32, No. 12, by Sergei Rachmaninoff, Abbey Road Studios, London, 1993
- Sonata No. 2 in B-flat minor (1913 edition) by Sergei Rachmaninoff, Abbey Road Studios, London, 1993
- Valses Nobles et Sentimentales by Maurice Ravel, Abbey Road Studios, London, 1993

== Works ==
- Practice What You Preach (2022), Dorrance Publishing Company: RoseDog Books. ISBN 978-1-63661-011-5
- Practicing for Love: A Memoir (2019), Dorrance Publishing Company: RoseDog Books. ISBN 978-1645305057
- Feels Like a Woman (1997), screenplay
- "Notes on the Program", Lincoln Center Stagebill, April 1987

== Filmography ==
- Matthew Kennedy: One Man’s Journey (2006), produced and directed by Nina Kennedy
- Portrait: An American Concert Pianist (1989), produced and directed by Nina Kennedy
