= Harry Gamble (disambiguation) =

Harry Gamble (1930–2014) was an American football coach and executive.

Harry Gamble may also refer to:

- Harry P. Gamble (1904–1995), American college football player, boxer, and attorney
- Harry Y. Gamble (born 1941), American biblical scholar

== See also ==
- Henry Gamble (1859–1931), Anglican priest and author
- Henry Floyd Gamble (1862–1932), African-American surgeon and obstetrician
