= Helen Morgan =

Helen Morgan may refer to:

- Helen Morgan (singer) (1900–1941), American singer and actress.
  - "Helen Morgan" (Playhouse 90), 1957 American television play biography of the singer Helen Morgan
  - The Helen Morgan Story, 1957 American film biography of the singer Helen Morgan
- Helen Morgan (field hockey) (1966–2020), Welsh field hockey player
- Helen Elizabeth Morgan (born 1952), Welsh actress, model, TV host and beauty queen
- Helen Clarissa Morgan (1845–1914), American educator
- Helen Morgan (politician) (born 1975), British politician
- Helen Morgan (1921–1955), the married name of diver Helen Crlenkovich
- Helen Moore (also known as Helen Morgan; died 1996), common-law wife and killer of jazz trumpeter Lee Morgan

== See also ==
- Helen Morgenthau Fox (1884–1974), American botanist and author of popular gardening books
