= Henrietta Myers =

American singer (1878 – 1968)

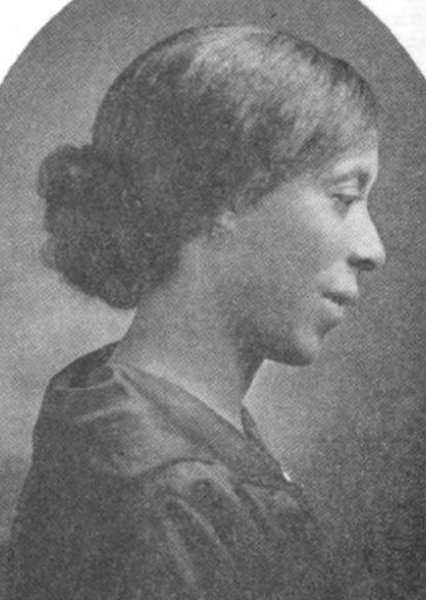
Henrietta Myers, from a 1918 publication

Henrietta Crawley Myers, a.k.a. "Mrs. James A. Myers" (10 November 1878 – 25 March 1968) was a singer (contralto) and choral director, primarily known for her work as director of the Fisk Jubilee Singers of Nashville, Tennessee.

== Early life ==
Henrietta Crawley was born November 10, 1878, in Nashville, Tennessee, the oldest of 10 children born to Thomas Edward and Mary Jane Crawley. She was educated in the public schools of Nashville, and later at Fisk University. She began her career as a Fisk Jubilee Singer under the direction of John W. Work II.

== Career ==
Married to The Reverend James A. Myers in 1906, she assisted her husband who was then director of the Jubilee Singers when they toured Europe nearly forty years after the original Singers had captivated international audiences. After his death in 1928, Mrs. Myers “…dedicated her life to continuing the work of showing the world the glorious music that is uniquely American.” She insisted upon using her married name, Mrs. James A. Myers, in all press and programs for the Jubilee Singers because she did not want white people to be able to show disrespect by calling her by her first name. Few knew her given name at all, except for close friends and family.

Maurice Ravel, the famed French composer, was so deeply enamored by the musicianship of the “Myers-directed” Singers that he presented them with a photograph signed “Homage to Perfection.” Other world-famous personalities "...enchanted by the matchless performances of the Fisk Jubilee Singers under Mrs. Myers’ direction" included Madame Curie, George Bernard Shaw, King George V, Queen Mary of Great Britain, Madame Eva Gauthier, and former Secretary of State Cordell Hull.

It was through the sponsorship of the U.S. State Department that Mrs. Myers and the Jubilee Singers toured widely throughout Europe, Asia, and South America.

Mrs. Myers retired from Fisk University in 1947, but for twelve more years she directed her quartet, sextet, and octet of singers throughout the world. In 1963, the Fisk Jubilee Singers under the direction of Matthew Kennedy, dedicated their annual Festival concert to Mrs. Myers. This was her last public appearance in the Fisk Memorial Chapel.

== Recordings ==
- “Ol’ Man River, Extrait de ‘Show Boat’ by Jerome Kern, Jubilee Singers, direction: Mrs. James A. Myers,” Pathé Records.
- “Joshua Fit the Battle of Jericho, Negro Spirituals, Jubilee Singers, direction: Mrs. James A. Myers,” Pathé Records.
- “Good News, Negro Spirituals, Jubilee Singers, direction: Mrs. James A. Myers,” Pathé Records.
- “I Want Two Wings sung by The Jubilee Singers (formerly known as Fisk Jubilee Singers), Mrs. James A. Myers, Director,” Avalon Records.
- “Rock in Jerusalem sung by The Jubilee Singers (formerly known as Fisk Jubilee Singers), Mrs. James A. Myers, Director,” Avalon Records.
- “Climbing Up the Mountain sung by The World Famous Jubilee Singers directed by Mrs. James A. Myers,” Rockhill Recording, Rockhill Radio.
- “Oh, What a Beautiful City sung by The World Famous Jubilee Singers directed by Mrs. James A. Myers,” Rockhill Recording, Rockhill Radio.
- “Little Tommy Went A-Fishing sung by The World Famous Jubilee Singers directed by Mrs. James A. Myers,” Rockhill Recording, Rockhill Radio.
- “Psalm CXXI written for and dedicated to the Fisk Singers by Frank La Forge, sung by The World Famous Jubilee Singers directed by Mrs. James A. Myers,” Rockhill Recording, Rockhill Radio.
- Magnolia Blossoms, featuring performances by the Fisk Jubilee Singers led by Mrs. James A. Myers. NBC syndication, originating from WSM, Nashville, Tennessee, 1940
