= Thomas E. Jones (university president) =

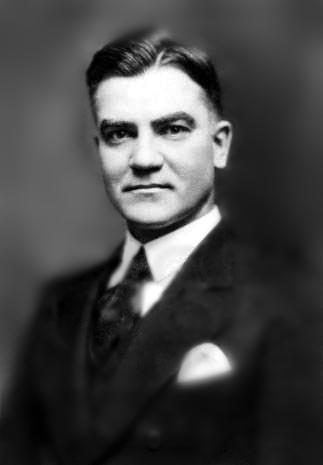
Thomas Elsa Jones, Fisk University, Nashville

Thomas Elsa Jones (March 22, 1888 – August 5, 1973) was the fifth president of Fisk University, serving - and especially fundraising - from 1926 to 1946. He was later president of Earlham College, 1946 to 1958. A Quaker, Jones served as a missionary with his wife in Japan, and sponsored the first 'Friends' meetings in Nashville on Fisk campus.

Born Elsa Mazzentine Jones, he grew up in Fairmount, Indiana and attended Fairmount Academy. Upon enrolling in Earlham College in 1909, he was assigned to a women's dormitory, so he asked his mother permission to adopt her maiden name, Thomas, as his own first name, and was thus known as Thomas Elsa for the remainder of his life. He received his bachelor's degree from Earlham in 1912, and subsequently studied at Hartford Theological Seminary, graduating with a B.D. in 1915. Jones earned an M.A. in 1917 and a Ph.D. in sociology in 1926 from Columbia University.

Jones died on August 5, 1973, in Richmond, Indiana, home of Earlham College.

== Sources ==
- Claus Bernet (2011). "Thomas E. Jones (university president)". In Bautz, Traugott (ed.). Biographisch-Bibliographisches Kirchenlexikon (BBKL) (in German). Vol. 32. Nordhausen: Bautz. cols. 744–746. ISBN 978-3-88309-615-5.
- Tennessee virtual archive
- Haverford College archival report on items relating to Fisk University
- Edward Thomas. Quaker Adventures: Experiences of Twenty Three Adventures of International Understanding. Chicago: Ravel Company, 1928.
- Time, Mar. 1, 1926
