= Agenia Walker Clark =

American academic administrator

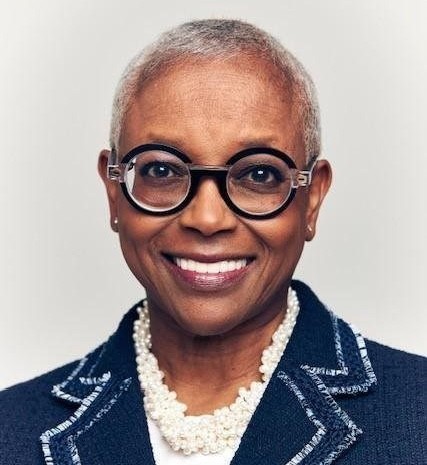

18th President of Fisk University
- Incumbent
- Assumed office November 6, 2023
- Preceded by: Frank Sims (acting)

Personal details
- Education: University of Tennessee (BS, MBA); Vanderbilt University (EdD)

Agenia Walker Clark is an American academic administrator serving as the president of Fisk University since 2023. She previously served as the chief executive officer for the Girl Scouts of Middle Tennessee for 19 years.

== Life ==
Clark earned a B.S. and M.B.A. from the University of Tennessee. She completed an Ed.D. in leadership at Vanderbilt University.

Clark was the vice president of human resources at the Tennessee Education Lottery Corporation. She served as a senior director of human resources at Vanderbilt University and was manager of government relations at Nortel Networks. Clark served as the chief executive officer for the Girl Scouts of Middle Tennessee for 19 years. In September 2023, she was named the incoming 18th president of Fisk University. She is its third female president. Clark succeeded interim president Frank Sims.
