= Virginia Broughton =

American author and Baptist missionary

Virginia E. Broughton
- Born: Virginia E. Walker; March 1, 1856; Nashville, Tennessee, United States
- Died: September 21, 1934 (aged 78)
- Occupations: Author; missionary
- Father: Nelson Walker

Virginia E. Broughton (née Walker; March 1, 1856 – September 21, 1934) was an African American author and Baptist missionary. One of four students in the first class at Fisk College in 1867, she later became a recognized religious scholar, writing articles for National Baptist Union and National Baptist Magazine. As a prominent member of the Baptist church and National Corresponding Secretary of the National Baptist Convention, she worked to ensure that the interests of African American religious women were addressed by the governing body of the Baptist denomination. Broughton was licensed as a missionary and subsequently commissioned to the mission field.

== Personal background ==
Virginia Walker was born free on March 1, 1856, in Nashville, Tennessee to Nelson Walker and Eliza (née Smart) Walker. Her father's master permitted him to hire out and work for fees, and to save some of his pay to earn enough money to buy his family's freedom. After obtaining freedom, Nelson Walker read the law with an established firm and became an attorney; he was known as the first African American man admitted to the state bar association in Davidson County, Tennessee.

Beginning in 1867, Broughton was one of the first four students to attend Fisk College (then offering classes equivalent to a primary school and upper grades) and its Normal Institute, dedicated to teacher training. In 1875, Broughton graduated with honors and earned her teaching credentials. In 1878, she earned a Master's degree in teaching, also from Fisk. Broughton, and America W. Robinson were the first four students to enroll at Fisk in 1867 when it opened. Broughton, James Dallas Burrus, and his brother John Houston Burrus were the first African Americans to graduate from a liberal arts college south of the Mason–Dixon line. (Robinson's graduation was delayed as she was touring overseas with the Fisk Jubilee Singers.)

Broughton began teaching in the public schools in Memphis, Tennessee. She served there until 1887, when she resigned and accepted a position with the B.B.N.&I. (Bible Bands) Institute in Memphis. Her position with the Institute was the official start of her missionary work. In August 1902, at the Woman's State Convention of Tennessee, Walker was elected to serve as the National Corresponding Secretary for the National Baptist Convention.

Walker married Julius A. O. Broughton Sr. and together, they had five children: Elizabeth, Emma, Selina, Virginia, and Julius, Jr.

Broughton developed diabetes later in life. She died on September 21, 1934, from complications of the disease. Her husband had died on December 4, 1930, from a stroke.

== Published works ==
- Broughton, Virginia E. Walker (1895). A Brief Sketch of the Life and Labors of Mrs. V. W. Broughton, Bible Band Missionary, for Middle and West Tennessee.
- Broughton, Virginia E. Walker (1904). Woman's Work: As Gleaned from the Women of the Bible, and the Bible Women of Modern Times.
- Broughton, Virginia E. Walker (1907). Twenty Year's Experience of a Missionary, New York Digital Library, full text online.
