= Mattie E. Coleman =

American physician (1870–1943)

- Born: Mattie Eliza Howard; July 3, 1870; Sumner County, Tennessee
- Died: August 12, 1943 (aged 73); Nashville, Tennessee
- Education: Central Tennessee College, Meharry Medical College
- Occupations: Physician, Suffragist
- Spouse: P. J. Coleman (m. 1902)

Mattie E. Coleman (1870–1943) was one of Tennessee's first African-American woman physicians. She was a religious feminist and suffragist who was instrumental in building alliances between black and white women.

== Life ==
Coleman née Howard was born in Sumner County, Tennessee, on July 3, 1870, the oldest of four children of an African Methodist Episcopal (AME) minister. After completing high school at the Walden University high school, Coleman graduated from Central Tennessee College in 1885.

She married the Reverend P. J. Coleman in 1902. When she married, she converted to her husband's denomination, the Colored Methodist Episcopal (CME) Church.

She graduated from Meharry Medical College in 1906, becoming one of the nation's first black female physicians.

Coleman died on August 12, 1943, in Nashville.

== Social activism ==
Dr. Coleman established a medical practice in Clarksville, Tennessee, providing medical assistance to the needy. With other black women seeking to improve social justice for African Americans, such as education and health care, she was active in women’s religious and secular societies. She was a founder in 1918 of the Woman’s Connectional Missionary Council, the first woman-run society within the Colored Methodist Episcopal Church (CME), and became its first president, a position she held for 20 years, until a few years before she died. In that role she worked closely with white women of the Methodist Episcopal Church, South. She worked with them, for example, on the sponsorship of the Bethlehem House settlement. The Bethlehem House provided a kindergarten, sewing schools, and Bible story hour, among other services. Neverdon-Morton 166-68.

Mattie Coleman recognized that white organizations could help black women achieve their social goals in a world where black women had limited agency and that black women could help white women define their own agendas. Both white women and black women wanted more leadership roles in their churches. In a speech as CME Connectional Ministry Council president, Coleman called upon the male church hierarchy for "an equal chance" to do the work "that is justly ours." Coleman enlisted white women to help black women gain independent roles in the church, even before white women had achieved that goal in their own churches. When Coleman addressed the first meeting of the CME Woman's Connectional Missionary Council in 1918, she observed, "There has always been a close relationship between the sisters of the M.E. Church, South and the sisters of the C.M.E. Church....We have long since realized that each one is dependent on the other."

Goodstein speculates that because of her leadership among CME women and their work with the white ME, South women, she "may very well have initiated the biracial alliance" in Nashville. This alliance was critical both to social justice goals and to suffrage. For example, black women sought a vocational school for delinquent black children. White suffragists recognized the organizational skills of Mattie Coleman and Juno Frankie Pierce

From 1939 until 1943 Coleman served as superintendent of the Tennessee State Vocational School for Girls.

== Suffrage ==
Coleman was also an advocate for women's suffrage. With Juno Frankie Pierce and others, she worked to register over 2,500 African-American women to vote in the 1919 Nashville municipal elections.

== See also ==
- List of suffragists and suffragettes
- Juno Frankie Pierce

== Bibliography ==
- Frederickson, Mary E. (1993). "Southern Churchwomen and Reform". In Hewitt, Nancy A.; Lebsock, Suzanne (eds.). Visible Women: New Essays on American Activism. Urbana and Chicago: University of Illinois Press. pp. 296–324. ISBN 0-252-06333-3.
- Goodstein, Anita Shafer (May 1998). "A Rare Alliance: African American and White Women in the Tennessee Elections of 1919 and 1920". The Journal of Southern History. 64 (2): 219–246. doi:10.2307/2587945. JSTOR 2587945.
