= America W. Robinson =

American singer (1855–1912)

America W. Robinson (January 1855 – 23 April 1912) was an American educator. Robinson was in the first graduating class of Fisk University and sang as a contralto with the Fisk Jubilee Singers. She was the first woman to graduate from Fisk University.

== Life and times ==
Robinson was born into slavery in January 1855 near Murfreesboro, Tennessee, where both her parents were slaves. Her father was a carpenter. When the Civil War started, his master opened an ammunition factory that produced guns for the Army of the South. He worked in the factory as a carpenter, making stocks for muskets.

The Battle of Stones River, 31 December 1862 – 2 January 1863 took place at Murfreesboro. Robinson witnessed treatment of soldiers from both Union and Confederate armies in a makeshift hospital established in her family's house. Her father took the chance to hide their family in a Union Army wagon, and they all escaped to the city of Nashville, finding freedom with the Union troops that occupied the city.

In 1912 when Robinson died, her address was listed as 502 West Pearl Street in Jackson, Mississippi.

== Education and training ==
In 1866, Robinson enrolled on opening day in the new Fisk Colored School at Nashville, founded by the American Missionary Association. Her teaching career began at the age of thirteen. She earned money for tuition and living expenses by teaching during the summer breaks each year.

In 1870, the US Census recorded the Robinson family lived in Davidson County, Tennessee. Her father Patrick Robinson, age 40, was noted as born in Virginia, and with the occupation of carpenter. He was classified as mulatto or mixed-race. Her mother was Elizabeth Robinson, age 34, born in Tennessee, also classified as mixed-race, which meant that both lines (and America and her siblings) had European-American ancestry as well as African. Her brother Martin Robinson, age 11, born in Tennessee, was also still living at home.

In 1875, Fisk University graduated James Dallas Burrus, John Houston Burrus, America W. Robinson, and Virginia Eliza Walker as the first class of Fisk University. These classmates were the first blacks to earn a bachelor's degree from a liberal arts college located south of the Mason–Dixon line In the late 1870s, Robinson and James Dallas Burrus became engaged, and Burrus borrowed money from her in order to attend graduate school at Dartmouth. But they ended their engagement by 1878. In 1890, Robinson earned a Master of Arts degree from Fisk.

Robinson married Edward Lucas, a schoolteacher, and the couple moved to Noxubee County, Mississippi. She opened a teacher's school and dedicated her life to the education of black children.

== Fisk Jubilee Singers ==
The Fisk Jubilee Singers, circa 1870s

Robinson became a member of the Fisk Jubilee Singers, and was the only Jubilee singer to graduate from Fisk University. Because they were touring, she did not attend her graduation ceremony. For the third tour from January 1875 until July 1878, she was a lead contralto with the Fisk Jubilee Singers. The group photograph of the Fisk Jubilee Singers, circa 1870s, shows the following members: Jennie Jackson – soprano, Maggie L. Porter – soprano, Edmund W. Watkins – bass, Mabel R. Lewis – contralto, Ella Sheppard – pianist, Maggie Carnes – soprano, Hinton D. Alexander – tenor, Frederick J. Loudin – bass, and America W. Robinson – contralto. During her time with the singers, Robinson asked for and won better pay and working conditions.

Robinson continued to tour with the Fisk Jubilee Singers until 1878. After touring Europe for 3 years, she stayed in Europe and studied French and German before returning to the United States to make a life as a teacher. She earned a master's degree in 1890. She became principal of the Macon Public School in Macon, Mississippi.
