= Miriam E. Carey =

American librarian and teacher (1858–1937)

Miriam Eliza Carey
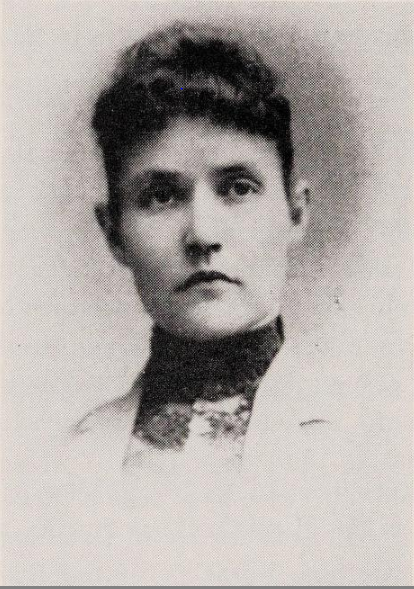
- Born: February 21, 1858; Peoria, Illinois
- Died: January 9, 1937 (aged 78); Cheyenne, Wyoming
- Education: Rockford Seminary; Oberlin College; University of Illinois
- Occupations: Librarian, teacher
- Known for: First libraries in state institutions throughout the United States

Miriam Eliza Carey (February 21, 1858, Peoria, Illinois - January 9, 1937 Cheyenne, Wyoming) was an American librarian who helped establish the first libraries in prisons and hospitals in Iowa and Minnesota.

== Education and career ==
Carey studied at Rockford Seminary (1876), Oberlin College, Ohio (1877) and the library school of the University of Illinois (1898).

She taught for many years but left her teaching career to attend the Illinois State Library School at the age of 40. She soon discovered a passion for librarianship while working at the Hull House in Chicago, a resettlement institution for immigrants, where she was greatly influenced by American activist Jane Addams. After attending the library school for one year, and without graduating, Carey left academia to take a position as director of the public library in Burlington, Iowa, and she worked there from 1899 to 1905.

In Burlington, she met Alice S. Tyler, who was secretary of the library commission working with a new college graduate, Fanny Duren, creating programs that would use books to help youth who were detained at the new School for Delinquent Boys. Based on the success of her work, Tyler convinced the Iowa Board of Control to create a new position, Supervisor for the Iowa State Institution Libraries, which was "the first position of its kind in America." Carey was appointed to the new job in 1906, and grew the program by establishing processes and methods to use books as a "rehabilitative tool in prison wards and mental hospitals, as well as in tuberculosis sanitariums and schools for delinquent children." In many cases, these were the first libraries housed in those institutions.

In 1913, after her success with the Iowa library plan, Carey was appointed to head a similar post as director of institutional libraries in Minnesota, for which she organized libraries at 18 institutions across that state.

She also taught at Talladega College, Fisk University and the University of Minnesota.

=== War years ===
During the years of World War I, the American Library Association sent Carey to army camps and hospitals in five southern states to establish libraries at each site. These greatly benefited the soldiers who were training or recovering from injuries and the movement helped launch a national intent to create libraries in civilian hospitals as well. From 1913 to 1923, she headed of the Committee on Libraries in Correctional Institutions in addition to her other duties.

Carey officially retired in 1927 at the age of 69, but nevertheless, she joined the faculty at the newly established library school at the University of Minnesota. She also went on to publish short stories about her efforts to set up libraries in prisons.

Miriam E. Carey died in Cheyenne, Wyoming, on January 9, 1937, at age 78.

=== Legacy ===
Carey's papers are held at the Minnesota Historical Society Library.

== Works ==
- Prison libraries. St. Cloud, Minn., Minnesota State Reformatory (1926)
- A Thousand Books for the Hospital Library
- In the Land of Counterpane: books for a crippled children's library (1916)
