= Helen Clarissa Morgan =

American educator

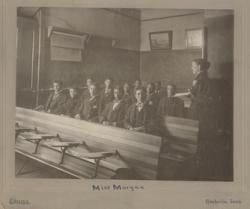
Helen Clarissa Morgan in the classroom

Helen Clarissa Morgan (February 25, 1845 – May 23, 1914) was an American educator from the U.S. state of New York. She was the first woman to be appointed professor of Latin in a US coeducational college.

== Early years and education ==
Helen Clarissa Morgan was born in Masonville, New York in 1845. The family moved to Oberlin, Ohio when Morgan was 12 years old. She graduated from Oberlin College in 1866, receiving the degree of bachelor of arts, and in 1911 that college conferred upon her the honorary degree of master of arts.

== Career ==
Upon graduation she taught for three years in Michigan, and in 1869 was called to Nashville, Tennessee to teach Classical Studies in Fisk University, which was then located in the Federal Hospital Buildings. W. E. B. Du Bois was a student in her Latin classes. Although she received a call to teach at Vassar College, she chose to devote her life to work among African Americans, and remained at Fisk University for 38 years. Morgan was an advocate for greater teacher training, publishing an article on the subject, in relation to her experiences at Fisk, in 1911. She was the first woman to be appointed professor of Latin in a US coeducational college. On account of her long and faithful service the Carnegie Foundation, on June 7, 1907, voted to Professor Morgan a retiring allowance. She died on May 23, 1914.
