= Nelson Walker =

Community leader in Tennessee

Nelson Walker (c. 1827 - July 7, 1875) was a community leader in Tennessee and Justice of the Peace. He was born enslaved, worked as a barber, purchased freedom for himself, his wife, and their four children, and became a wealthy lawyer, judge and bank president in Nashville, Tennessee. He was a member of the masonic fraternity.

In 1871 he served as a director of the Tennessee Colored Agricultural and Mechanical Association as well as the Freedman's National Life Insurance Association. Nelson served as Treasurer for the first Negro Masonic Lodge and was influential in gaining support and funding for Mount Ararat Cemetery, Nashville's first black cemetery.

Mason died at his home July 1875. He was described in his obituary as a "prominent colored man" and noted as the first black Justice of the Peace in his county, elected to office in 1866.
