= Matthew Washington Kennedy =

American classical composer (1921–2014)

Matthew Kennedy

Matthew Washington Kennedy (10 March 1921 – 5 June 2014) was an American classical pianist, professor, choral director, composer, and arranger of Negro spirituals. He is widely known as the director of the historic Fisk Jubilee Singers of Nashville, Tennessee from 1957 to 1986.

== Early life and education ==
Kennedy was born in Americus, Georgia, the fourth child of Royal Clement Kennedy and Mary Magdalene Dowdell. His father was a postal worker, and died of a heart attack when Matthew was 15 months old. Royal Clement's parents had been enslaved on the Kennedy Plantation near Andersonville, Georgia. Matthew's mother was born to Joseph and Maria Dowdell in Sumter County, Georgia. She was a public school teacher. A child prodigy, he picked out the melodies on the piano of hymns and spirituals he heard sung by his mother, and composed his first piano piece called "The Bells" at age six. Kate Land agreed to give him piano lessons in exchange for having her house cleaned by Matthew and his cousin. The star of his own radio show at age 11, Matthew played the organ to accompany silent films at the segregated cinema where he was given the stage name "Sunshine", and was dressed in a bellhop uniform. In 1932, Matthew and his mother sat in the segregated balcony for a live concert given by famed Russian pianist Sergei Rachmaninoff in Macon, Georgia. Frustrated with the segregated South, Mary Kennedy decided to move with her son to New York City. Soon after they arrived, Matthew auditioned at the Juilliard School, and was admitted because of his imitation of Rachmaninoff's playing style. Lois Adler gave him a personal scholarship for study in the Preparatory Division. He simultaneously studied and graduated from DeWitt Clinton High School, and earned a diploma in piano from Juilliard in 1940. His teacher Lois Adler advised Kennedy to return to the South for his college degree, and arranged for him to study at Fisk University in Nashville, Tennessee on scholarship. In 1940, Henrietta Myers was director of the Fisk Jubilee Singers at the time, and she asked Kennedy to serve as piano accompanist for the group. From Fisk, Kennedy was drafted to serve in World War II, and was sent to North Africa and Southern France. After returning from the war, he graduated from Fisk University with a Bachelor of Arts degree in 1947 (cum laude). Kennedy went on to earn his Master of Arts degree from Juilliard in 1950, and completed coursework toward his Ph.D. from George Peabody College in Nashville.

== Career ==
Employed by Fisk University as an instructor in 1947, Kennedy became a member of its music faculty in 1954 as an associate professor. In 1956, he married pianist Anne Gamble. Kennedy was appointed director of the Fisk Jubilee Singers in 1957, and he mentored hundreds of young students for the next twenty-three years. In 1958, Kennedy made his own solo piano debut at Carnegie Hall. Over the years, Kennedy toured the world as a concert pianist and as director of the Fisk Jubilee Singers. He was appointed acting chairman of the Fisk University Music Department in 1975. He retired from Fisk University in 1986. Kennedy had served on resource panels for the Tennessee Arts Commission, and on boards of the Nashville Symphony Association and the John W. Work, III Memorial Foundation. He received the Achievement Award from the National Black Music Caucus of the Music Educators' National Conference, distinguished service awards from the National Association of Negro Musicians, the Fisk University Alumni Association, and Omega Psi Phi fraternity. Kennedy held lifetime memberships with the NAACP and the Fisk University General Alumni Association. He was a member of the Nashville Fine Arts Club where he served as president. He was also a member of the Nashville Symphony Guild, Gamma Phi chapter of Omega Psi Phi, First Baptist Church, Capitol Hill, and an inductee into the Georgia Music Hall of Fame in Macon, Georgia. At Fisk he was inducted into Phi Mu Alpha Sinfonia music fraternity. In 2003, Kennedy released his first album, Familiar Favorites. In 2006, he received an honorary Doctor of Humane Letters degree from Fisk University. In September 2006, Jim Cooper, representative of Tennessee, entered a statement honoring Kennedy into the Congressional Record, which took place during the Proceedings and Debates of the 109th Congress, Second Session, in Washington, DC.

Kennedy continued to play the piano for the congregation at First Baptist Church, Capitol Hill in Nashville after he was into his 90s. He died on June 5, 2014, at the age of 93.

== Appearances in film ==
In 2007, Kennedy's daughter Nina Kennedy, also a concert pianist, directed and produced a documentary film, Matthew Kennedy: One Man's Journey, which won the award for Best Film by a Black Filmmaker at the 2007 Nashville Film Festival (NaFF). He also appears in a short video titled Matthew Kennedy: The Nashville Student Sit-Ins (2006), produced by The Visionary Project.

== Publications ==
Two Spirituals, Abingdon Press, 1974:

- "Ev'ry Time I Feel the Spirit"
- "Steal Away"

== Selected discography ==
- Matthew Kennedy: One Man's Journey – Soundtrack CD, Kennedy Music Group, 2008
- Familiar Favorites, Kennedy Music Group, 2002
- "The Dream Boogie" by David N. Baker, Eye of the Storm, Fisk University 43rd Annual Arts Festival, 1972
- Fisk Jubilee Singers in Performance, Matthew Kennedy, director. Century Records
- Toccata in C major, Op. 7 by Robert Schumann, Nola Recording Studios, Broadcaster Records, 1953
- Étude in G-flat major, Op. 25, No. 9 by Frédéric Chopin, Nola Recording Studios, Broadcaster Records, 1953
- Harmonies du soir by Franz Liszt, Nola Recording Studios, Broadcaster Records, 1953
- Toccata by Francis Poulenc, Nola Recording Studios, Broadcaster Records, 1953
- "Triana" from the suite Iberia by Isaac Albéniz, Nola Recording Studios, Broadcaster Records, 1953
- "Ol' Man River" by Hammerstein and Kern, performed by the Jubilee Singers, direction: Henrietta Myers, Pathé Records, 1947
