= Anne Gamble Kennedy =

American pianist (1920–2001)

Anne Gamble Kennedy (September 25, 1920 – June 11, 2001) was an American classical pianist, piano professor, and accompanist for the Fisk Jubilee Singers of Nashville, Tennessee.

== Early life ==
Anne Lucille Gamble was born in Charleston, West Virginia to Dr. Henry Floyd Gamble and the former Nina Hortense Clinton. She was the younger of two children born to that union. She had two older step-siblings as well. She was eleven-years-old when her father was killed in a car accident in 1932. Her paternal grandmother had been born while enslaved on the Howard's Neck Plantation in Goochland County, Virginia. Her paternal grandfather, Henry Harmon Gamble, was a foreman on the same plantation, and of Scots-Irish and Native-American descent. Anne's mother was a high school music teacher and a member of Frederick J. Loudin's Jubilee Singers.

Kennedy and famed contralto Marian Anderson were friends and colleagues. The two met when Anderson stayed in Gamble's home while in Charleston because, as an African American, she was not allowed to stay in hotels.

Kennedy received her early education in Charleston public schools, which were segregated at the time. She later studied in the Junior Department at West Virginia State College under David Carroll and Theodore Phillips. Matriculating at Fisk University in 1937 where she studied with William Duncan Allen and graduated cum laude in 1941 with a Bachelor of Arts degree, and joined the Alpha Kappa Alpha sorority. She then won competitive scholarships at the Oberlin Conservatory of Music while studying with the Conservatory Director, Dr. Frank Shaw, and later with John Elvin, receiving a Bachelor of Music degree. Her further education included study at the Juilliard School of Music, George Peabody College, and artist training with pianist Ray Lev in New York.

== Career ==
She auditioned for Duke Ellington while he was in Charleston, who invited her to perform in New York. Kennedy was a performing artist and teacher, and launched a concert career after serving on the piano faculties of Tuskegee Institute and Talladega College. Her career was interrupted when she accepted an invitation extended by Professor John Wesley Work III in 1950 to teach piano at Fisk University for one semester. The "one semester" resulted in Kennedy's tenure of thirty-two years. For seventeen of her years at Fisk, she served as accompanist and piano soloist with the Fisk Jubilee Singers under directors John Wesley Work and Matthew Kennedy. In 1956 she married Matthew Kennedy in the Fisk Memorial Chapel. Their wedding was a gift from then Fisk President Charles S. Johnson. Their daughter is pianist, filmmaker, and orchestral conductor Nina Kennedy.

Kennedy and her husband traveled and performed as duo pianists, and were known for their rendition of Mozart's Sonata for Two Pianos. She received critical acclaim for her performances of Norman Dello Joio's A Jubilant Song and Undine Smith Moore's Lord We Give Thanks to Thee with the Fisk Jubilee Singers under Matthew Kennedy at New York's Carnegie Hall and the John F. Kennedy Center for the Performing Arts in Washington, DC. Her final faculty recital at Fisk in 1970 included the Liszt Sonata in B minor, Bach-Tausig's Toccata and Fugue in D minor, Chopin's Barcarolle, Ravel's Valses Nobles et Sentimentales, and John Wesley Work III's Appalachia Suite. She also received critical acclaim for her performance of Beethoven's Choral Fantasy as piano soloist with the Nashville Symphony and the Fisk University Choir.

In 1954, artist Aaron Douglas selected Anne Gamble for a series of portraits of distinguished Fisk faculty, commissioned by Fisk University.

After her retirement from Fisk, Kennedy was known for her performances of her own arrangement of Albert Malotte's "The Lord's Prayer." She participated in community activities, including The Women's Advisory Committee of the Tennessee Performing Arts Foundation; music consultant for the Fine Arts Committee of the Nashville Chamber of Commerce; member of "The Outing" Committee, Nashville Symphony Benefit; Vice President of the John W. Work, III Memorial Foundation; the Nashville Chapter of Links, Inc.; and a Life Member of the NAACP. A music scholarship at Fisk University has been named in honor of Kennedy and her husband, titled "The Matthew and Anne Gamble Kennedy Scholarship Fund."

In celebration of her 100th birthday, INFEMNITY Productions launched a virtual exhibit honoring the life of Anne Gamble Kennedy on September 25, 2020.

== Recordings ==
"The Dream Boogie" by David N. Baker, Eye of the Storm, Fisk University 43rd Annual Arts Festival, 1972

Concert Étude in D-flat Major "Un Sospiro", by Franz Liszt, Wilcox-Gay Corporation, 1947

Malagueña by Ernesto Lecuona, Wilcox-Gay Corporation, 1947

Polonaise in A-flat major, Op. 53, by Frédéric Chopin, Wilcox-Gay Corporation, 1947
