= Minnie Lee Crosthwaite =

American community organizer, activist, and social worker

- Born: 1872; Nashville, Tennessee
- Died: 1963 (aged 90–91)
- Education: Fisk University

Minnie Lee Crosthwaite (née Harris; 1872–1963) was an American community organizer, women's rights activist, and social worker, one of the first Black social workers in Kansas City, MO.

== Biography ==
Minnie Lee Harris was born and raised in Nashville, Tennessee, and attended Fisk University; both her parents had been enslaved. She became a teacher and taught first grade for two years in her hometown, but left the workforce to marry Dr. David N. Crosthwaite, in 1899. Her husband was also an educator; he was the principal at Nashville's first all-Black high school at the time of their marriage. The couple moved to Kansas City, Missouri, in 1895 so that her husband could take a teaching position at Lincoln High School (now Lincoln College Preparatory Academy). Here he became, like his wife, active in a number of important social organizations that advocated for the rights and the education of African-American citizens. They had three children, and Minnie Crosthwaite started and owned both a beauty salon and a flower shop in Kansas City.

== Career ==
In 1920, Crosthwaite became a volunteer with the Provident Hospital Association. This began her career in the social services. She became a full time social worker in 1922, at the age of 50. She became the director of the Provident Hospital's outpatient clinic and worked in that role until 1947. Throughout her career she supported the hospital, including with an annual fashion fundraiser show that she first organized in 1918, with paid for such things as an X-ray machine and a home for the nurses who worked at the hospital. Her annual fundraiser "became the biggest financial supporter for the hospital". Crosthwaite was active in a number of organizations including the NAACP and the YWCA, and was a prominent member of the Colored Women's League, for which she served as a city and state president. She died in 1963. She was later described as a women's activist and "a leader of the black women's club movement in the city".
