= Henry Floyd Gamble =

American physician

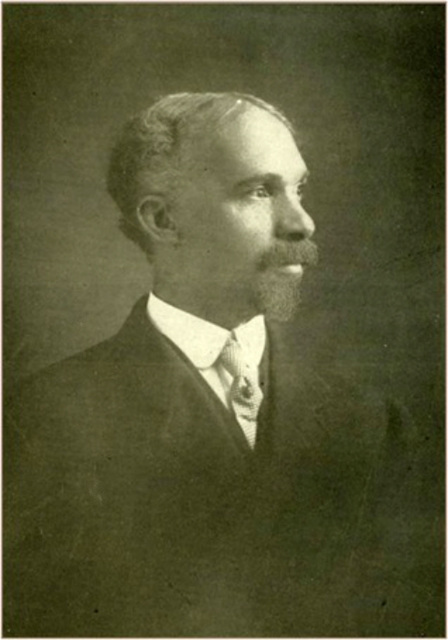
Dr. Henry Floyd Gamble

Henry Floyd Gamble (16 January 1862 – 7 September 1932) was an African-American surgeon, obstetrician, physician and president of the National Medical Association from 1911 to 1912.

Gamble was born on 16 January 1862 in North Garden, Virginia to Henry Harmon Gamble, a foreman on his master's estate, and to Willie Ann Howard, a slave. After the Civil War his family settled near Charlottesville, Virginia. About 1875 his mother sent Gamble to work in the household of John Staige Davis as a houseboy. Davis' son taught Gamble to read and write until Davis forbade that. From 1879 to 1882 Gamble continued his education with a night teacher. By then he had saved $50, enough to enter the preparatory department of Lincoln University. He started college in 1884 and graduated with a B.A. in 1888. He proceeded to study medicine at Yale School of Medicine, waiting tables and working as a janitor to finance his studies. He graduated with a M.D. in 1891 and set up practice in Charlottesville, but relocated to Charleston, West Virginia in 1892. Gamble was elected president of the National Medical Association in 1911, and was the founder of the West Virginia state association. From 1922 onward Gamble focused on surgery, particularly for the local coal miners.

The father of four children, his first wife Elizabeth Gilmer of Virginia gave him a daughter, Katherine Lee. His second wife Anna Banks of Pennsylvania gave him a son, Floyd. His third wife, Nina Hortense Clinton of Zanesville, Ohio, bore two children, Howard Clinton and Anne Lucille.

Gamble died in September 1932 in a car accident in Charleston.
