= James Dallas Burrus =

American educator, druggist & philanthropist (1846-1928)

James Dallas Burrus (14 October 1846 – 5 December 1928) was an American educator, druggist and philanthropist from Tennessee. He and a brother were among the first three graduates of Fisk University, the first African Americans to graduate from a liberal arts college south of the Mason–Dixon line. After completing graduate work in mathematics at Dartmouth College, Burrus became the first professor of mathematics at Fisk University. He later continued his teaching career at Alcorn Agricultural and Mechanical College in Mississippi.

== Life and times ==
James Dallas Burrus was born into slavery in 1846 at Murfreesboro, Rutherford County, Tennessee, the son of William C. J. Burrus and his enslaved common-law wife, Nancy Burrus. The couple had three mixed-race sons: James Dallas Burrus, John Houston Burrus, and Preston Robert Burrus.

William C. J. Burrus (WCJ Burrus) (18 December 1815 – 25 May 1859) was a white planter, lawyer, and politician. He had a sister Elizabeth Burrus (1802–1850). Their parents were Joseph Burrus (1762–1821) and Sophia Rucker (1775–1835).

Burrus had purchased Nancy at a slave auction in Nashville. WCJ Burrus died on 25 May 1859, less than two years before the Civil War broke out. He was buried in Burrus Cemetery on his plantation Cherry Lane Acres, Rutherford County, Tennessee.

His will provided for his slave wife Nancy to inherit his estate. The courts of Rutherford County did not recognize this provision or the will at all. The estate, including Nancy Burrus and her three sons, became the property of a nephew by marriage, the son-in-law of Burrus's sister.

== Civil War period ==
After Burrus's nephew, Colonel James Camp Tappan, inherited the four slaves, he took them with him during his service in the Confederate Army. Tappan had married Mary Elizabeth Anderson on 26 June 1854; she was the daughter of Burrus's sister, Elizabeth (Burrus) and her husband Judge Samuel Anderson of Rutherford County, Tennessee.

He assigned Nancy Burrus as a cook and the three sons as man servants to officers. Tappan fought in campaigns across Mississippi, Louisiana, Texas, and Arkansas. In 1865, at the end of the Civil War, the Burrus family was in Marshall, Texas with what remained of Braxton Bragg's Army of Mississippi.

The Emancipation Proclamation of President Abraham Lincoln delivered the family into freedom. They made their way to Shreveport, Louisiana, then to New Orleans, and eventually to Memphis, Tennessee. In Memphis, James and John were able to find work. Before long the family moved to Nashville. In Nashville, James and John worked as wait staff in hotels and began to save for college.

== Training and education ==
To increase his income, James Burrus began teaching in the primary and secondary schools in Goodlettsville, Tennessee and in Arkansas. In 1867, Burrus and his brother John enrolled as part of the first, four-person class at Fisk University. They pursued an academic, classical education. James was to study mathematics and John would study Greek. They needed preparatory classes to supplement their education. In 1875, Fisk University graduated James Burrus, John Houston Burrus, Virginia Eliza Walker and America W. Robinson as the first class of Fisk University. They were the first blacks or people of color to earn a bachelor's degree from a liberal arts college south of the Mason–Dixon line.

Fisk's faculty was then majority-white and most also served as missionaries. Recognizing James' promise, they tried to persuade him to enter the ministry. He chose mathematics instead, and the instructors encouraged Burrus to continue his studies. Robinson and Burrus were engaged for a short period, but during much of this time she was touring in Europe with the Fisk Jubilee Singers. They broke it off by 1878, and he never married.

Robinson loaned Burrus money to attend graduate school at Dartmouth College, where he enrolled in 1877 to study mathematics. In 1879, he was awarded the Master of Arts in mathematics. This was the first instance of an African American to receive a master of arts degree in the United States.

== Professional career ==
In May 1881, Burrus accepted an appointment at Fisk University as the first professor of mathematics. In 1882, he received an appointment at Alcorn Agricultural and Mechanical College in Mississippi as professor of mathematics and superintendent of the college farm.

== Philanthropy ==
Throughout his life, Burrus was a donor to Fisk University. Beginning around 1915, Burrus donated property worth $7,000 to Fisk University. In 1915, a gift of $600 (~$19,095 in 2025) was made. In 1917, James and Preston Burrus together made a contribution to Fisk in the amount of $112 (~$2,815 in 2025) to the Fisk Endowment Fund. An 85-acre farm was given to the school in 1922 by these two brothers.

When Fisk University needed funds in 1926 to remove a debt, during a capital campaign the Burrus brothers donated $1,000 (~$14,147 in 2024). Upon James Burrus's death in 1928, his will stipulated that his estate be left to Fisk University. At the time of his death, his estate consisted of 85 houses, and stocks and bonds, valued at over $120,000.

== Death ==
In 1928, Burrus died on a streetcar at Nashville, Davidson County, Tennessee. The certificate of death listed the cause as chronic myocarditis and contributory factor as old age. His occupation at the time of death was druggist and he was single.

Burrus left $100,000 to Fisk University. The announcement of his death and bequest made the front page of newspapers across the country in the United States.

== Awards and honors ==
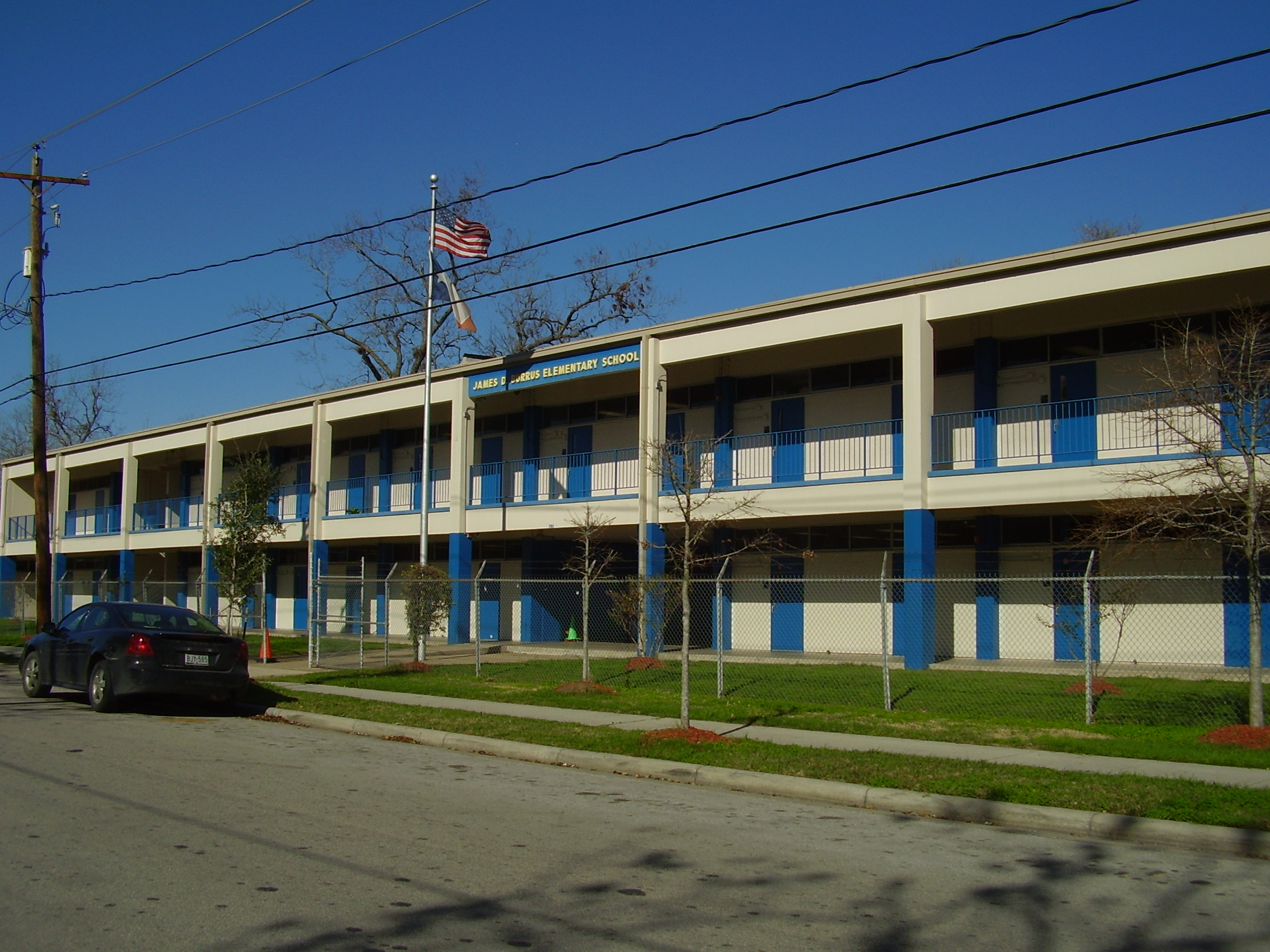
Burrus Elementary School

- Burrus Hall at Fisk University was built from funds bestowed in his will.
- Burrus Elementary School in Houston, Texas was named in his honor.
- Burrus Hall, a female dormitory on the campus of Alcorn State University.
