= John Houston Burrus =

American educator (1849–1917)

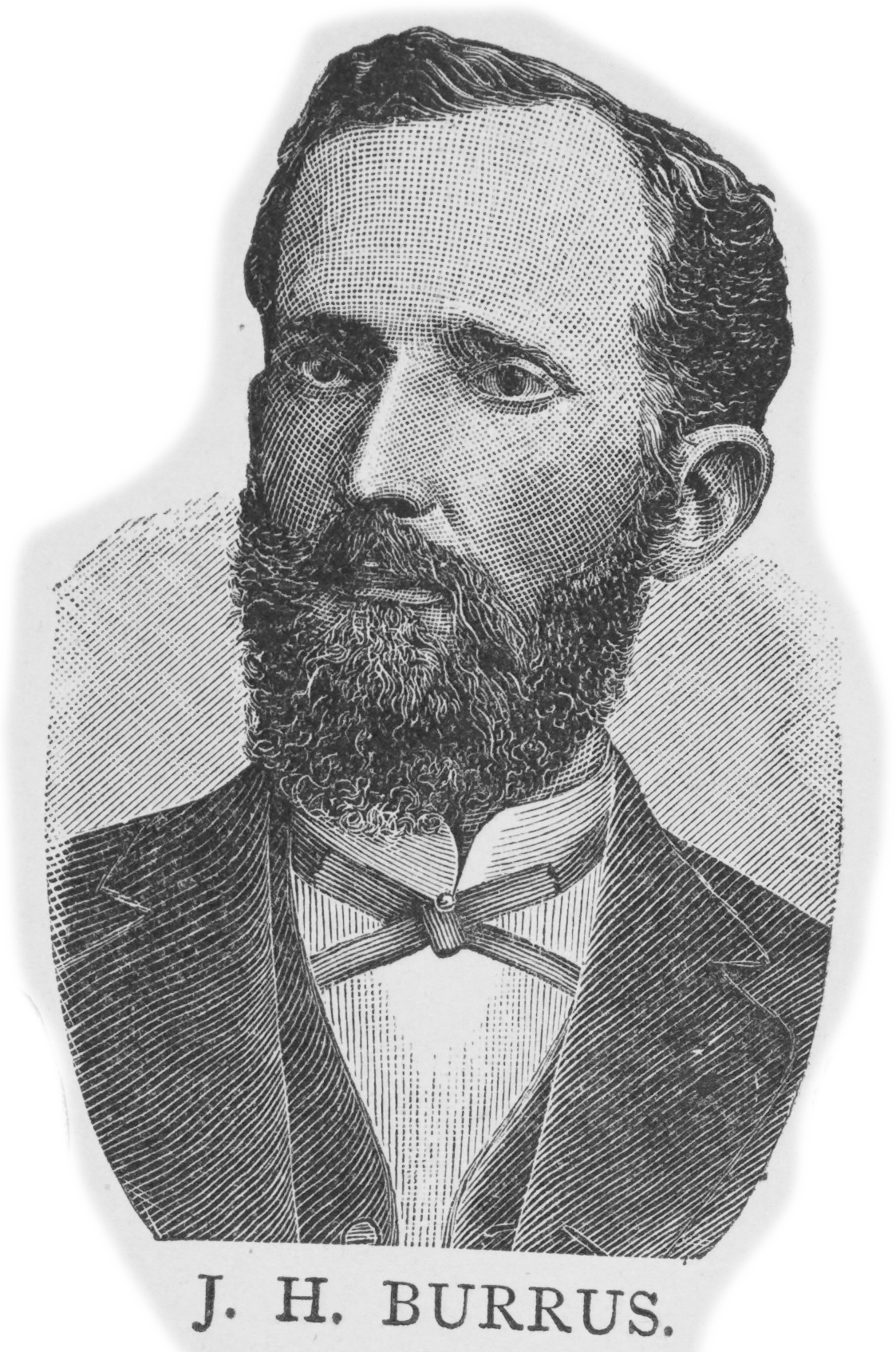
- Image of Burrus from 1887
- Born: February 22, 1849; Rutherford County, Tennessee, U.S.
- Died: March 27, 1917 (aged 68); Nashville, Tennessee, U.S.
- Education: Fisk University
- Occupation: educator
- Political party: Republican

John Houston Burrus (February 22, 1849 – March 27, 1917) was an educator in Nashville, Tennessee and Lorman, Mississippi. He was a member of the first class of students at Fisk University in Nashville and when that class graduated became among the first group of African-Americans to graduate from a liberal arts college south of the Mason–Dixon line. He was a professor of mathematics at Fisk and in 1883 became the second president of Alcorn Agricultural and Mechanical College, a position he held until 1893.

== Early life ==
John Houston Burrus was born February 22, 1849, to William C. J. Burrus and his slave, Nancy, near Murfreesboro, Tennessee, in Rutherford County. William was a planter and lawyer and had been a Whig member of the General Assembly of Tennessee. Nancy was mixed-race: African-American, Native American, and white. William and Nancy had two other sons, James Dallas Burrus and Preston Robert Burrus and lived together as husband and wife, with William never otherwise marrying; James later remembered their relationship as affectionate and respectful. William died in 1860 and the Burrus family went to a brother of their master, the mother as a cook and the brothers as body servants, serving their master while he was a soldier in the US Civil War (1861–1865).

At the end of the War, Burrus, was with his two brothers, mother, and Braxton Bragg's Army in Marshall, Texas. Finally free, they were brought to Shreveport, Louisiana, then to New Orleans, and then Memphis, Tennessee, where John took a job as a cook on a stern-wheel steamboat. He remained in Memphis for a short time, and moved in 1866 to Nashville, where he took a job as a hotel waiter along with James. The pair studied nights with two ladies boarding at the hotel where they worked. During this time they saved enough and learned enough so that by 1867 they were able to enroll at Fisk University along with America W. Robinson and Virginia Walker, who were the schools first students. During his first year at Fisk John converted to the Congregational Church. As a student, Burrus would teach during the summer until his eyesight began to weaken. In the summers of 1873 and 1874 he gave religious presentations with a panorama he bought. At Fisk, John studied Greek and James studied math. John, James, and Virginia Walker graduated in May 1875, becoming the first blacks to graduate from a liberal arts college south of the Mason–Dixon line. America would join the Fisk Jubilee Singers and become fiancé to James, although they did not marry.

== Career ==
After graduation, Burrus became a teacher at a school in the suburbs of Nashville and was quickly promoted to principal. In 1876 he was selected by the Republican State committee as a delegate to the Republican National Convention. At the convention, he initially gave his support to Oliver P. Morton, but finally supported Rutherford B. Hayes on the last ballot, which nominated Hayes. That fall he accepted principalship of the Yazoo city school In Yazoo, Mississippi, and in June 1877, he was offered a position of instructor of mathematics at Fisk University in place of his brother who had just resigned from the position. He taught for two years at Fisk and received an A.M. (masters) degree in May 1878 along with Virginia Walker (now Virginia Walker Broughton) and America Robinson. In 1879, he resigned in favor of his younger brother who had just graduated. In 1878 he was elected permanent secretary of the Tennessee Republican State convention and was secretary and treasurer of the State executive committee for the next two years. He was elected to the board of school directors for his district for consecutive three year terms from 1878 to 1884. The district had two other directors, both white, and 17 teachers, of whom nine were white. He served as chairman of the board and succeeded in equalizing the salaries of the white and black teachers. In 1880, he spoke at the State Teachers Institute convention in Nashville about unequal funding in schools. This was based on the requirements of the Morrill Act of 1862 which funded land-grant institutions and resulted in new scholarships for black students at Fisk University. He was chosen alternate delegate to the 1880 Republican National Convention. In 1882 he was a candidate for register in Davidson County, Tennessee, in August, and in November he was a candidate for the Tennessee House of Representatives. While at Fisk, Burrus began to study law and he was admitted to the bar in 1881. He also began to work as a correspondent for several newspapers and did some real estate work, forming the Laborer's Cooperative Building and Endowment Association.

=== Alcorn A&M ===
In August 1883 he was offered the presidency of Alcorn Agricultural and Mechanical College in Lorman, Mississippi, following Hiram Rhodes Revels in that position. James Burrus had become professor of mathematics and superintendent of the college farm in 1882, and had played a key role in promoting John for the position. He held the position until 1893 until forced to retire due to health issues. He was very successful and the enrollment at Alcorn increased greatly during his tenure. In 1898 he attended the National Educational Association Convention in Nashville.

== Later life and death ==
After leaving Alcorn, he continued to be active in education. In 1903, he wrote to the Nashville American again criticizing inequal treatment of blacks when federal moneys given to Tennessee under the Morrill Acts were dispersed. He also continued to practice law until his health further deteriorated. He then purchased a farm on Brick Church pike in Nashville. He died of bronchial pneumonia on March 27, 1917, in Nashville. His funeral was at Howard Congregational Church and was buried in Greenwood Cemetery.
