= Minnie Lou Crosthwaite =

American teacher

Minnie Lou Crosthwaite (née Scott; August 20, 1860 – January 13, 1937) was an American teacher who became the first African-American woman to pass the teacher exam in Nashville's segregated school system. She later became an instructor and then registrar at Fisk University, and was influential in the social life and the education of the city's African-American community.

== Biography ==
Minnie Lou Scott was born on August 20, 1860, in Nashville to Frances McAlister Scott; her father is unknown. She attended Fisk University from 1865 to 1867 (at that time it offered primary education), and afterward was schooled in the public school system, until 1874. Later, she recalled having been at the opening of the Fisk School in 1865; the event made a lasting impression on her. She went back to Fisk in 1874 to receive teacher training and graduated at age 17, in 1877. In 1884 she married Scott Washington Crosthwaite, who held medical degrees from Meharry Medical College in Nashville (1889) and Chicago Homeopathic Medical College (1891), and a degree in divinity from Fisk (1901).

=== Educational career ===
From 1874 to 1879, Scott, her husband, taught part of the year in county schools; at the time, all teachers at Nashville's colored schools were white. With his wife he tested the system to see if it would hire Black teachers, and so Minnie became the first Black person to take and pass the teachers' exam. At the time she was a junior getting a bachelor's degree, but took the opportunity to remedy the "crisis in the education of colored children". She, her husband, a man named Robert White, and an unknown young woman became the first Black teachers in Nashville's public school system; Scott became a principal (and, in addition, practiced medicine from 1891 to 1896). Both were well aware of the racist violence against African-Americans in Nashville: her husband witnessed the lynching of Ephraim Grizzard, and two white neighbors of hers, "young ladies", showed her pieces of clothing ripped from Grizzard's body. Minnie taught in the Nashville schools for fourteen years. The family moved to Knoxville, and then back to Nashville; upon their return she enrolled at Fisk to finish her BA degree, which she got in June 1903.

=== Career at Fisk ===
After graduation, she became a math instructor at Fisk, the first of a number of different positions including principal of the "Normal Department" (1906–1910), and finally registrar (1910), though she also taught in the Normal Department until 1916. As registrar, she showed a keen interest in the students, and was charged with keeping detailed records on students and alumni. Apparently, she remembered all the students who went through Fisk during her tenure, and she was a memorable figure to them. She retired in 1925–26, and was honored with the title of "registrar emeritus" two years later. One of her colleagues was John Wesley Work Jr., whose dedication to his students she praised.

=== Volunteerism and legacy ===
Crosthwaite raised funds for needy soldiers during World War 1, and then became an important early figure in the foundation of the YWCA, also heading the Fisk chapter. She worked for the Nashville branch of the YWCA, and joined the Southern Interracial League. She was active in other local African-American organizations as well and became friends with people like Nettie Napier and Juno Frankie Pierce. With Pierce, she founded the Tennessee Vocational School for Colored Girls (1923). After she retired from Fisk the joined the alumni board, in 1927, and in that year the family moved to Minneapolis–Saint Paul, and then in 1928 to Detroit. She died there, on January 13, 1937; in 1963, Fisk University named a new women's dorm in her honor.
