= Fisk University =

Historically black university in Nashville, Tennessee, US

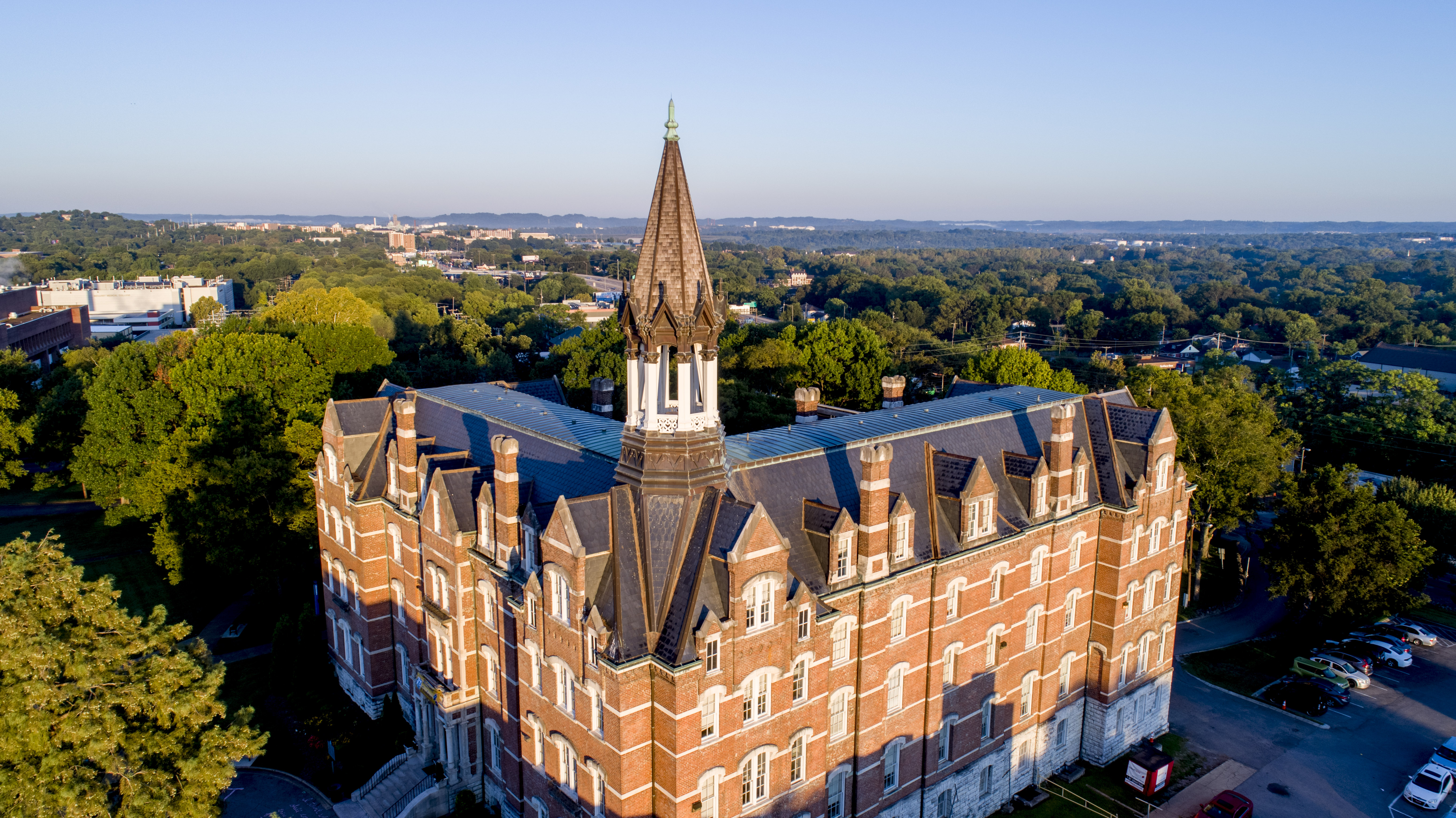
- Jubilee Hall
- Former name: The Fisk Freed Colored School (1866–1867)
- Motto: "Her sons and daughters are ever on the altar"
- Type: Private historically black liberal arts college
- Established: 1866; 160 years ago
- Religious affiliation: United Church of Christ (historically related)
- Academic affiliations: UNCF; ORAU; CIC
- President: Agenia Walker Clark
- Faculty: 70 full-time
- Students: 1,055 (fall 2022)
- Location: Nashville, Tennessee, U.S. 36.1688°N 86.8047°W
- Campus: Urban, 40 acres (16 ha)
- Language: English
- Colors: Gold and blue
- Nickname: Bulldogs
- Sporting affiliations: NAIA – HBCUAC
- Mascot: The Fisk Bulldog
- Website: www.fisk.edu

Fisk University is a private historically black liberal arts college in Nashville, Tennessee, United States. It was founded in 1866 and its 40-acre (16 ha) campus is a historic district listed on the National Register of Historic Places.

In 1930, Fisk became the first historically black institution to gain accreditation by the Southern Association of Colleges and Schools (SACS). Fisk is the oldest institution for higher education in Nashville.

== History ==
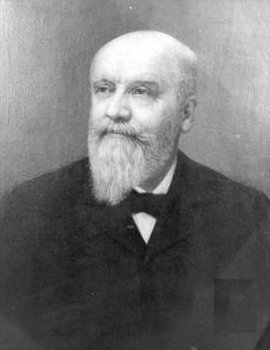
University namesake Clinton B. Fisk

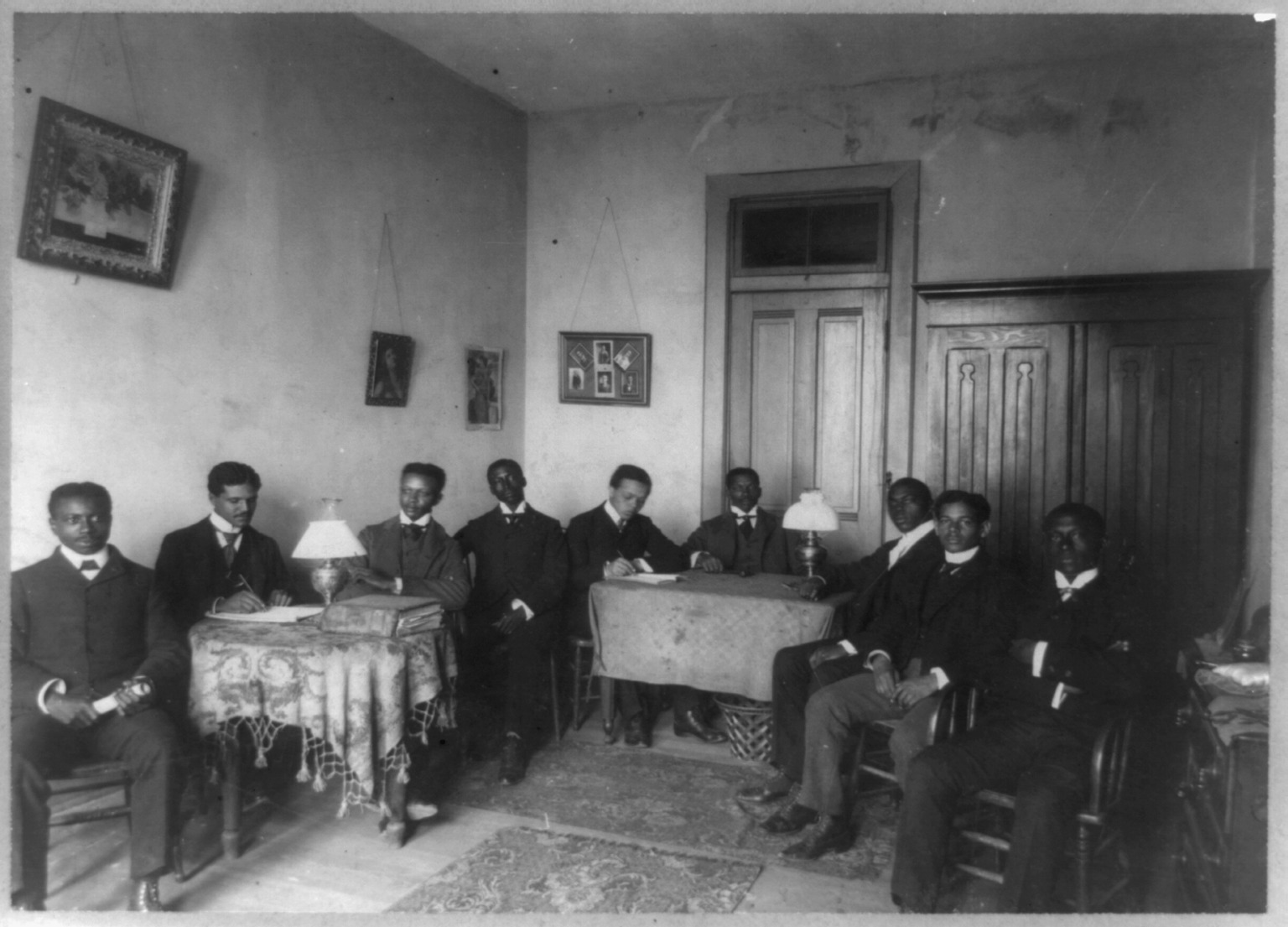
A class c. 1900

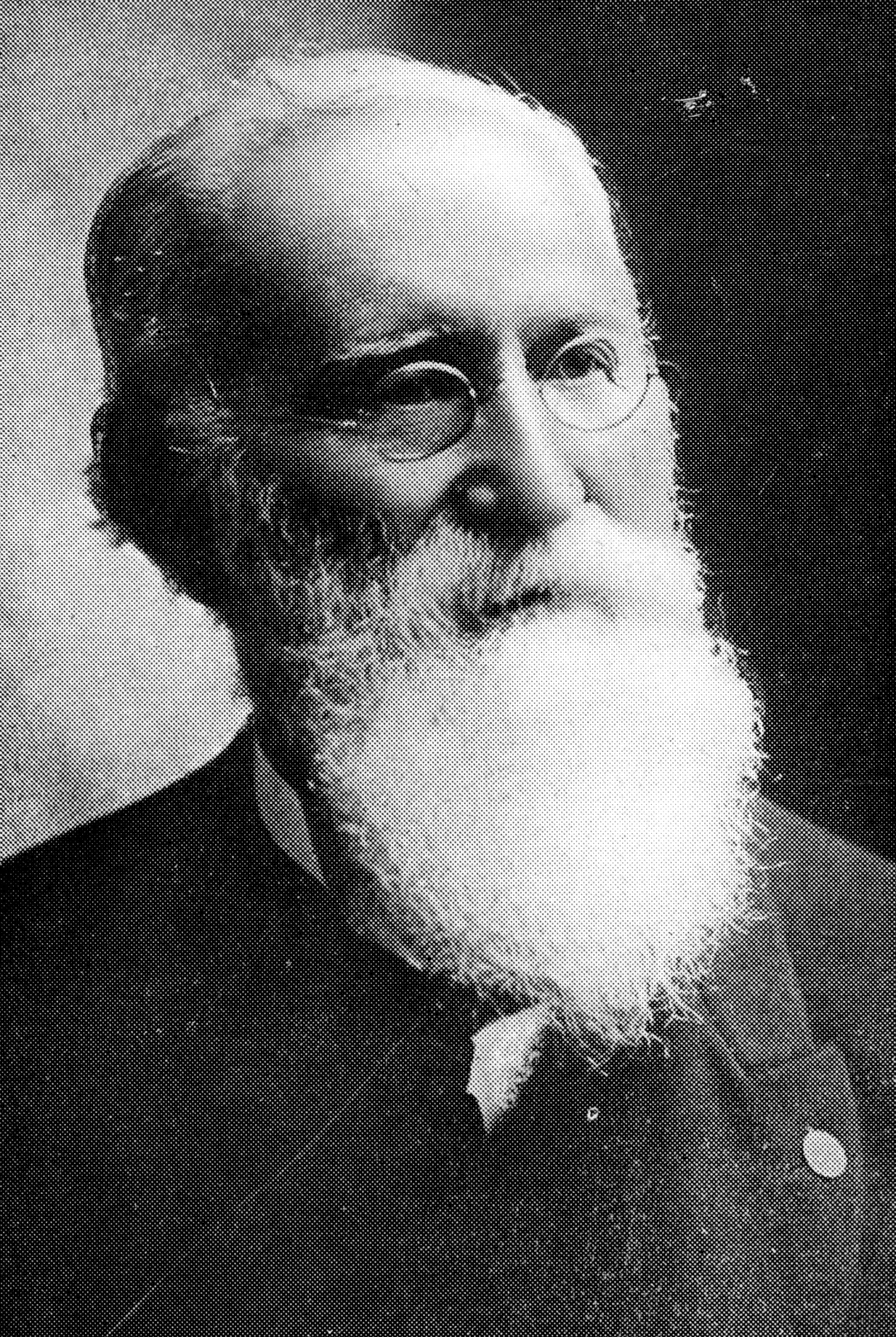
John Ogden, co-founder of Fisk University

=== Founding ===
Fisk Free Colored School opened on January 9, 1866, during the Reconstruction era shortly after the end of the Civil War. It was founded by John Ogden, Erastus Milo Cravath, and Edward Parmelee Smith of the American Missionary Association for the education of freedmen in Nashville. Fisk was one of several schools and colleges that the Association helped found across the South to educate freed slaves. The school is named for Clinton B. Fisk, a Union general and assistant commissioner of the Freedmen's Bureau of Tennessee. Fisk secured a site to house the school in a former military barracks near Union Station and provided $30,000 of government funds for its endowment.

The American Missionary Association's work was supported by the Congregationalist church, which retains an affiliation with Fisk. Fisk is the oldest higher education institution in Nashville.

=== 19th century ===
Enrollment rose to 900 in the first several months following the school's opening, indicating the strong desire for education among local freedmen. Student ages ranged from seven to 70.

During the nation's Reconstruction era, the Tennessee General Assembly passed legislation to enable free public education, which caused a need to increase teacher training. In 1867 the Fisk Free Colored School was reorganized and incorporated as Fisk University to focus on higher education. James Dallas Burrus, John Houston Burrus, Virginia E. Walker, and America W. Robinson were the first students to enroll at the institution. In 1875, the two Burruses and Walker graduated from Fisk and became the first African-American students to graduate from a liberal arts college south of the Mason–Dixon line.

The Tennessee Constitution of 1870 was ratified with a provision, Article XI § 12, that prohibited public schools from enrolling both Black and White students. In 1869, the University of Tennessee (then Eastern Tennessee University) had been designated a federal land-grant university, which meant that it was required to enroll all qualified citizens of the state, regardless of race or color. To get around the requirement of integration, ETU paid tuition for Black students with State Scholarships to enroll at Fisk University in 1881–83. The contract was changed to Knoxville College in 1884.

In 1870, Adam K. Spence became the school's principal. Spence developed plans to expand and move the school to a larger campus in north Nashville on a site that had been Fort Gillem, a Union army base. To raise money for the school's initiatives, his wife Catherine Mackie Spence traveled throughout the United States to set up mission Sunday schools in support of Fisk students, organizing endowments through the American Missionary Association. With a strong interest in religion and the arts, Adam Spence supported the founding of a student choir; they were the start of the Fisk Jubilee Singers.

With the school facing financial distress, the choir went on tour to raise funds in 1871, led by professor and university treasurer George L. White. They toured the U.S. and Europe and became a sensation, singing before Ulysses S. Grant, Mark Twain, Queen Victoria; popularizing spirituals written by Wallace Willis such as "Swing Low Sweet Chariot"; and changing racial stereotypes. Their tour raised nearly $50,000 (~$1.2 million in 2025) and funded construction of Jubilee Hall. (In W.E.B. Du Bois' book The Souls of Black Folk, this number is quoted at $150,000). It was the first building built for the education of freedmen in the South and is now a National Historic Landmark.

Fisk co-founder Cravath returned in 1875 and became the institution's first president. He oversaw an active construction program and expansion of the school's curriculum offerings to include liberal arts, theology, and teacher training. By the turn of the 20th century, it had strengthened its reputation, built several campus buildings, added African-American teachers and staff, and enrolled a second generation of students.

=== 20th century ===
James Griswold Merrill served as acting president of Fisk from 1899 to 1901, then continued as the institution's president from 1901 to 1908. Fisk University's dedication to liberal arts education at the turn of the century distinguished it from many other black colleges and universities that emphasized vocational training. The school established a department of social science in 1910, founded and directed by George E. Haynes. It was the first social work training center for African-American graduate students and a model for those established at other institutions. The school was criticized by some at the time for fostering an elitist reputation.

From 1915 to 1925, Fayette Avery McKenzie was president of Fisk. McKenzie's tenure, before and after World War I, was during a turbulent period in American history. In spite of many challenges, McKenzie developed Fisk as the premier all-Black college or university in the United States, secured Fisk's academic recognition as a standard college by the Carnegie Foundation, Columbia University and the University of Chicago, raised a $1 million endowment fund to ensure quality faculty, and laid a foundation for Fisk's accreditation and future success. McKenzie was eventually forced to resign when his strict policies on dress code, extracurricular activities, and other aspects of student life led to student protests in 1924 and 1925.

Thomas Elsa Jones became the institution's fourth president in 1925. He sought to diversify Fisk's faculty and further build the school's reputation. In 1930, Fisk became the first historically black college to gain accreditation by the Southern Association of Colleges and Schools. It was also the first such institution approved by the Association of American Universities in 1933. Accreditations for specialized programs soon followed.

In 1946, Charles S. Johnson became Fisk's sixth president and first African-American president. Johnson was a premier sociologist, a scholar who had also been the editor of Opportunity magazine, a noted periodical of the Harlem Renaissance. Johnson expanded the school's Institute of Race Relations, which was established in 1942. The institute conducted research and fostered discussion about racial disparity in the U.S. and would later help develop strategies for desegregation in schools, employment, and the military. In 1949, Fisk received the Stieglitz Collection of modern art from photographer and arts patron Alfred Stieglitz.

In 1952, Fisk was the first predominantly black college to earn a Phi Beta Kappa charter. Organized as the Delta of Tennessee Chapter of the Phi Beta Kappa National Honor Society that December, the chapter inducted its first student members on April 4, 1953. Established in 1776, Phi Beta Kappa is the oldest and most prestigious academic honor society in the U.S.

In 1960, Fisk students joined other black leaders in the Nashville sit-ins, nonviolent protests against segregation at lunch counters in the city during the civil rights movement. Martin Luther King Jr., spoke at the institution in May 1960 in response to civil rights movement in the city. Fisk students John Lewis and Diane Nash were leaders during the protests, which led to Nashville becoming the first major city in the South to desegregate lunch counters. The two became early leaders of the national Student Nonviolent Coordinating Committee (SNCC).

On April 8, 1967, a riot occurred near the Fisk and Tennessee State University campuses after Stokely Carmichael spoke at Vanderbilt University. Although it was viewed as a "race riot", it had classist characteristics. Protestors marched from Fisk to the Nashville courthouse to protest police brutality during the riots.

In 1978 Fisk's campus was recognized as a National Historic Landmark. The campus underwent significant restoration in the 1990s through assistance from a U.S. Congressional Grant.

=== 21st century ===
In 2001, Carolynn Reid-Wallace became the first woman president of the university.

From 2004 to 2013, Fisk was directed by its 14th president, Hazel O'Leary, former Secretary of Energy under President Bill Clinton. She was the second woman to serve as president of Fisk. On June 25, 2008, Fisk announced that it had successfully raised $4 million (~$5.86 million in 2025) during the fiscal year ending June 30. It ended nine years of budget deficits and qualified for a Mellon Foundation challenge grant. However, Fisk still faced significant financial hardship, and said that it may need to close its doors unless its finances improved.

H. James Williams served as president from February 2013 to September 2015. Williams had been dean of the Seidman College of Business at Grand Valley State University in Michigan, and previously an accounting professor at Georgetown University, Florida A&M, and Texas Southern University. Williams was succeeded by interim president Frank Sims. In March 2017 the Fisk board of trustees announced that Kevin Rome would be Fisk university's seventeenth president.

In June 2017, a service in memory of 1892 lynching victim Ephraim Grizzard was held in the Fisk Memorial Chapel. A plaque memorializing Grizzard and two other lynching victims—his brother Henry and Samuel Smith—was installed at St. Anselm's Episcopal church in Nashville.

In 2018 the Southern Association of Colleges and Schools placed the institution on probation. The accreditor cited failings related to financial responsibility, control of research funds, and federal and state responsibility. Fisk announced a fundraising record and increased enrollment the following year. In 2020, Fisk was taken off probation and maintained its accreditation.

== Campus ==
- Fisk University Historic District
- U.S. National Register of Historic Places
- U.S. Historic district
- Location: Roughly bounded by 16th and 18th Aves., Hermosa, Herman and Jefferson Sts. Nashville, Tennessee
- Architectural style: Italianate; Queen Anne
- NRHP reference No.: 78002579
- Added to NRHP: February 9, 1978

Fisk's 40-acre campus was dedicated in 1876. It sits on a small hill approximately two miles northwest of downtown that was previously Fort Gillem, a Union fort during the Civil War. The campus lies on Jefferson Street, a historic center of Nashville's African-American community.

The Fisk University Historic District was added to the National Register of Historic Places in 1978. Notable campus buildings that contribute to the historic district include:

- The Carl Van Vechten Gallery was built in 1888. It served as the school's gymnasium before becoming an art gallery. The building houses Fisk's renowned Stieglitz Collection of modern art. It is named for photographer Carl Van Vechten.
- Carnegie Hall was originally built as a library in 1908. It is the first major building by Moses McKissack III, co-founder of the first African-American owned architecture firm in the United States.
- Cravath Hall, named for the institution's first president Erastus Milo Cravath and completed in 1930, is an eight-story building originally used as a library. It was designed by Henry Hibbs. The building features a series of murals by painter Aaron Douglas, which he described as a "panorama of the development of Black people in this hemisphere, in the new world." The murals have been described as the most ambitious works of his career. The building now houses administrative offices.
- Fisk Memorial Chapel was built in 1892 in the Victorian style. At the time it was the largest building for African Americans to gather in the country. The chapel hosts campus functions and public events such as concerts, lectures, and graduations. The building was restored and rededicated in 1992.
- Jubilee Hall, completed in 1876, is the oldest permanent building for the higher education of African Americans in the United States. It is named for the Fisk Jubilee Singers who toured the country to raise funds for its construction. The six-story, L-shaped building is noted for its Victorian Gothic architecture.
- Talley Brady Hall, built in 1931, is the first modern chemistry building at a historically black college or university. It is named for Thomas E. Talley and St. Elmo Brady, two notable African American chemists and faculty members.

Additional campus buildings listed on the register include Little Theater, Harris Music Building, numerous residential structures, and a limestone wall built around 1873.

In the 1930s, Fisk hired the Olmsted Brothers firm to lead a master design of its campus at this time, resulting in the Beaux-Arts landscape.

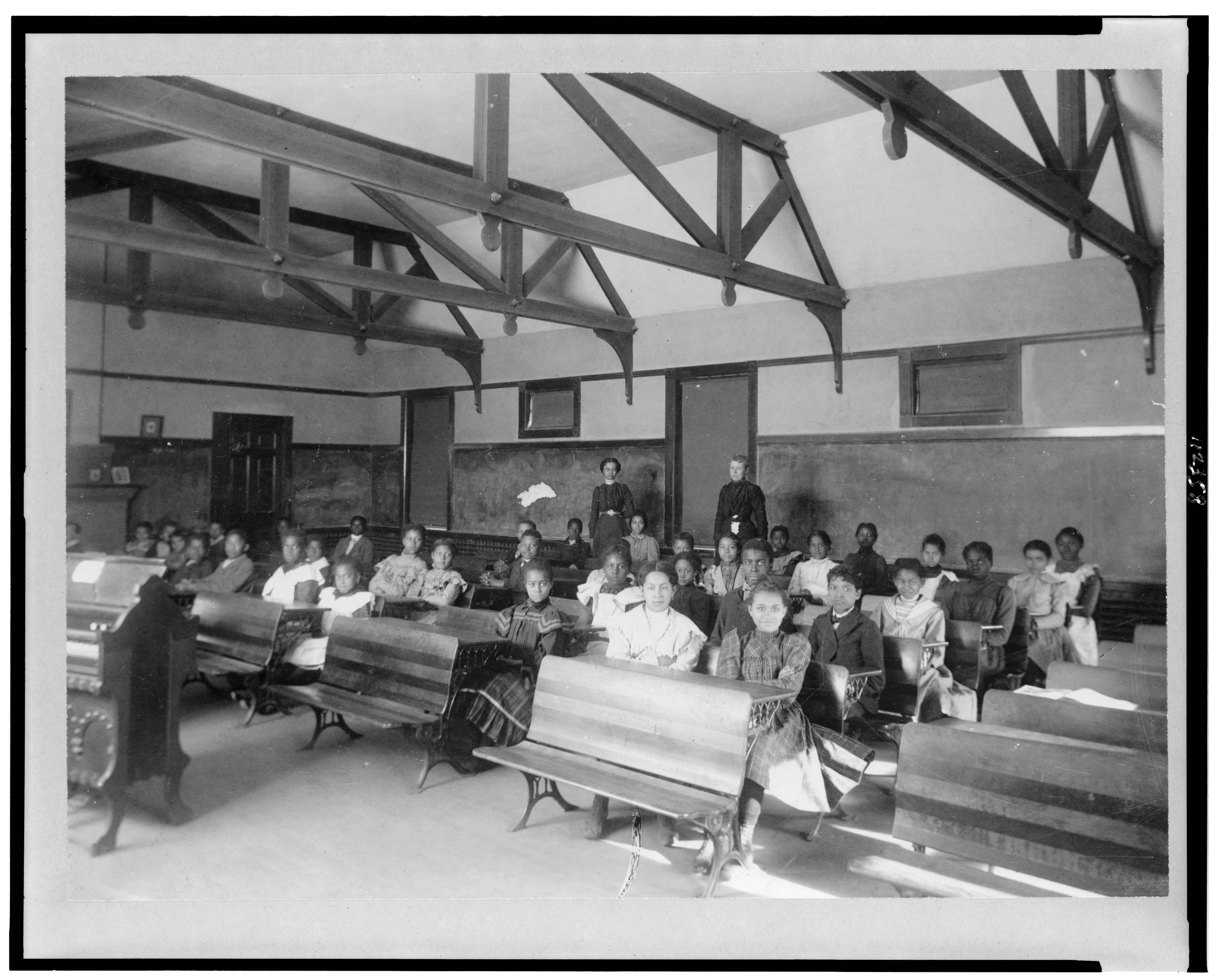
Students and teachers in training school (between 1890 and 1906)

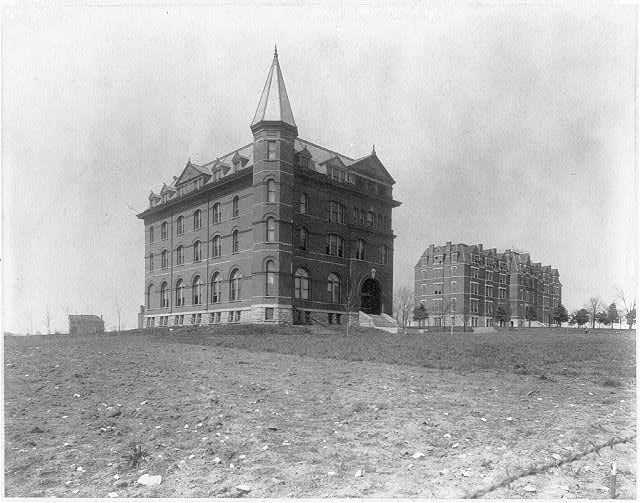
Theological Hall (later Bennett Hall). The building was demolished.

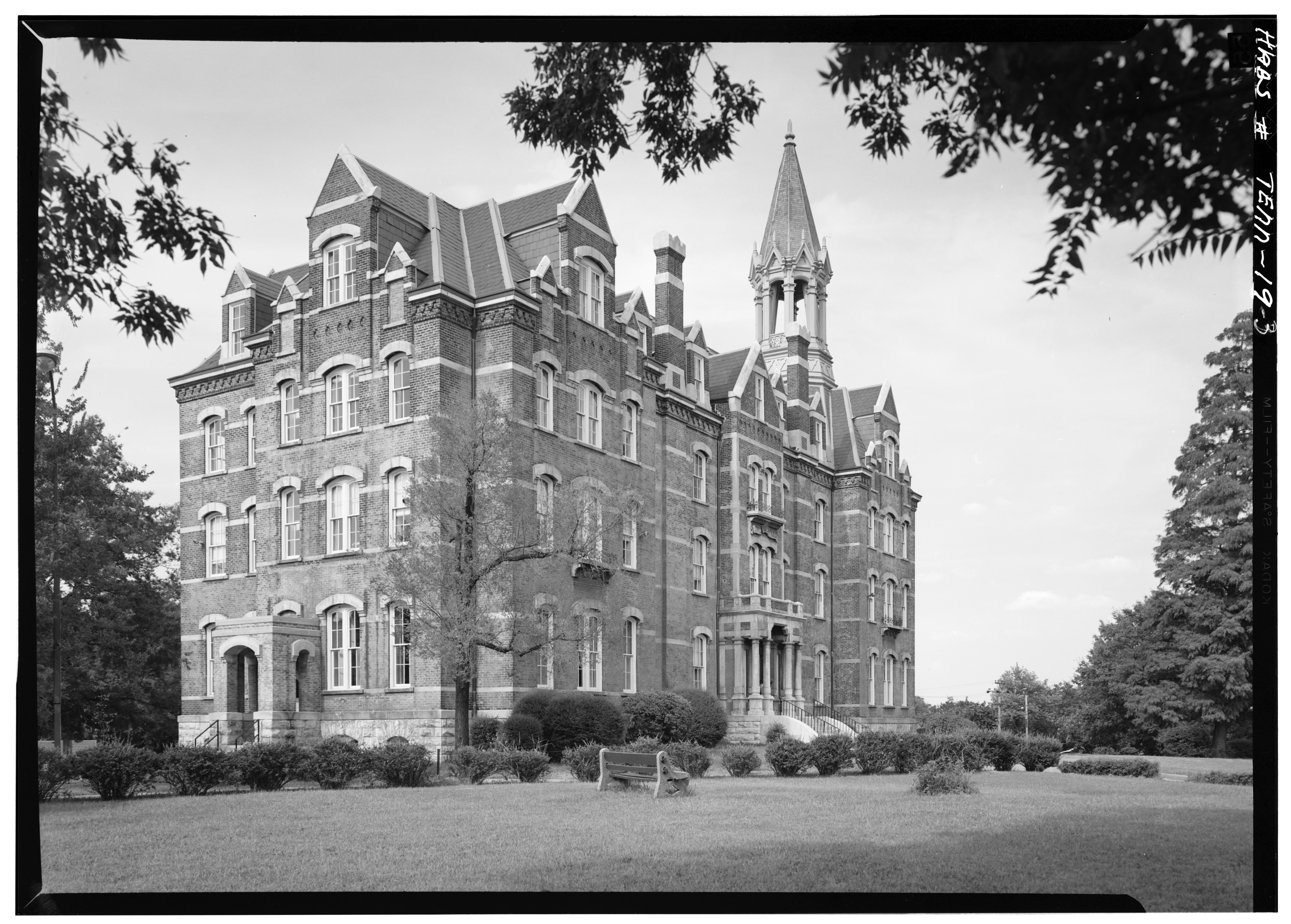
Jubilee Hall

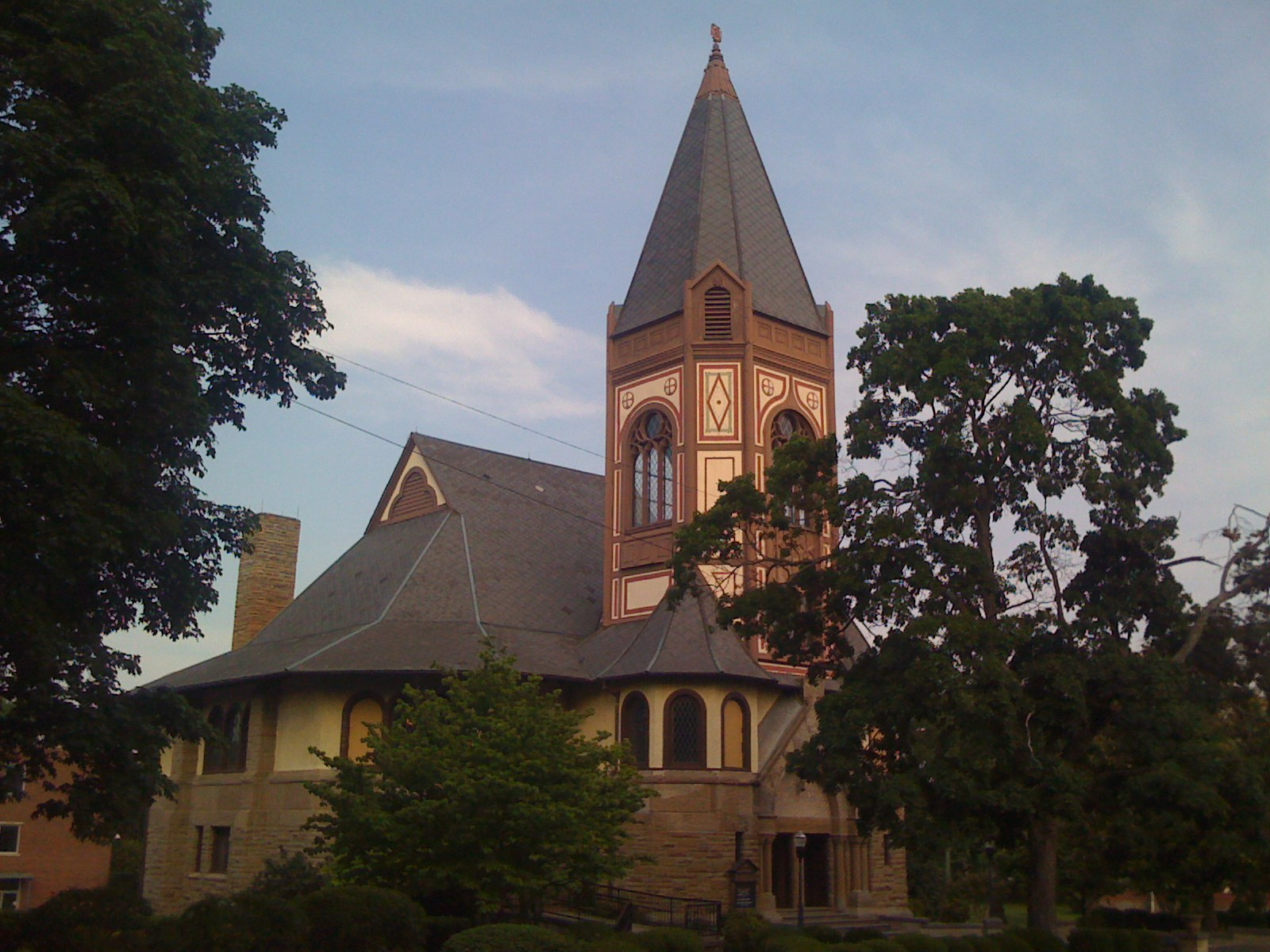
Fisk Memorial Chapel

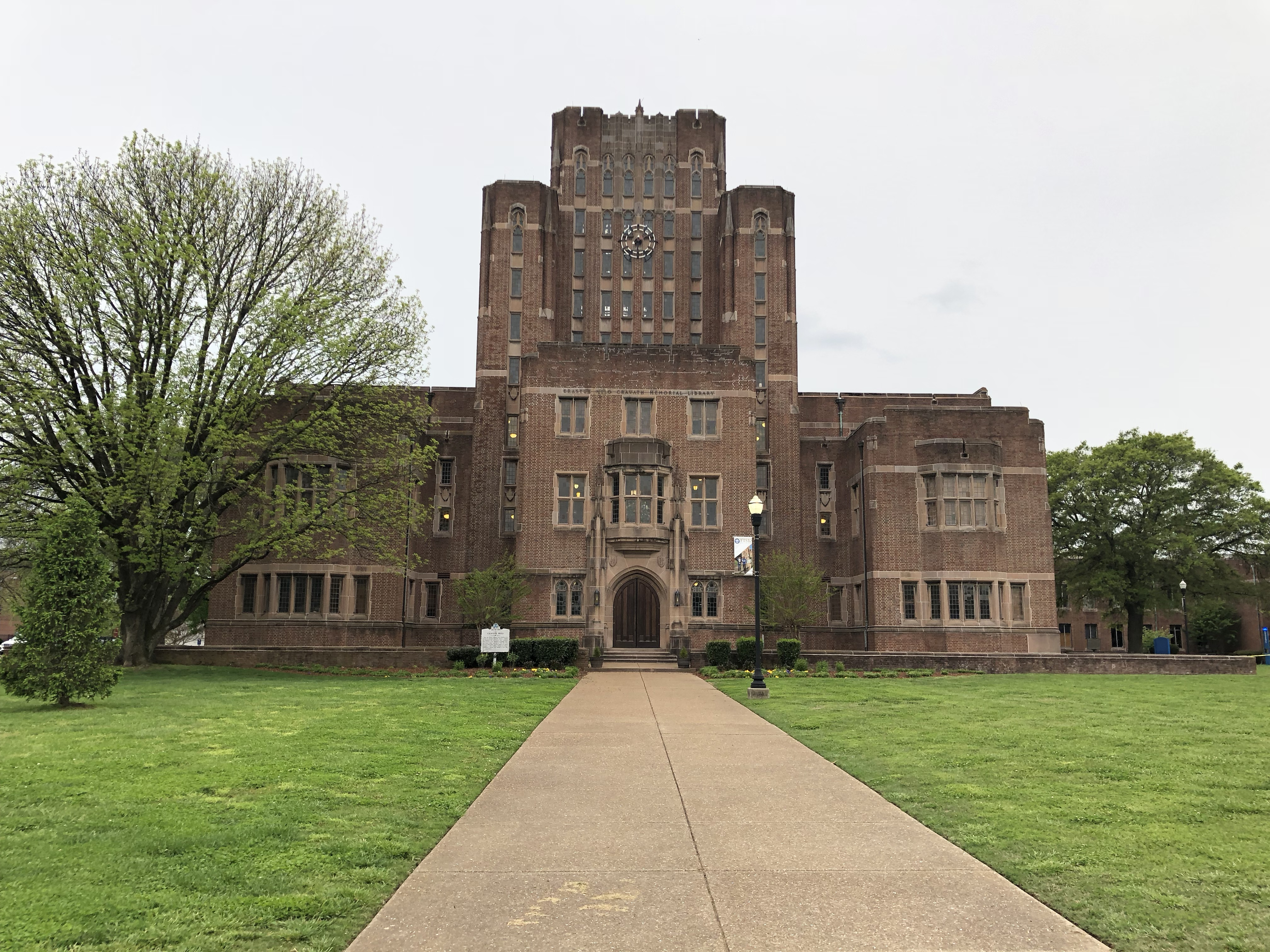
Cravath Hall

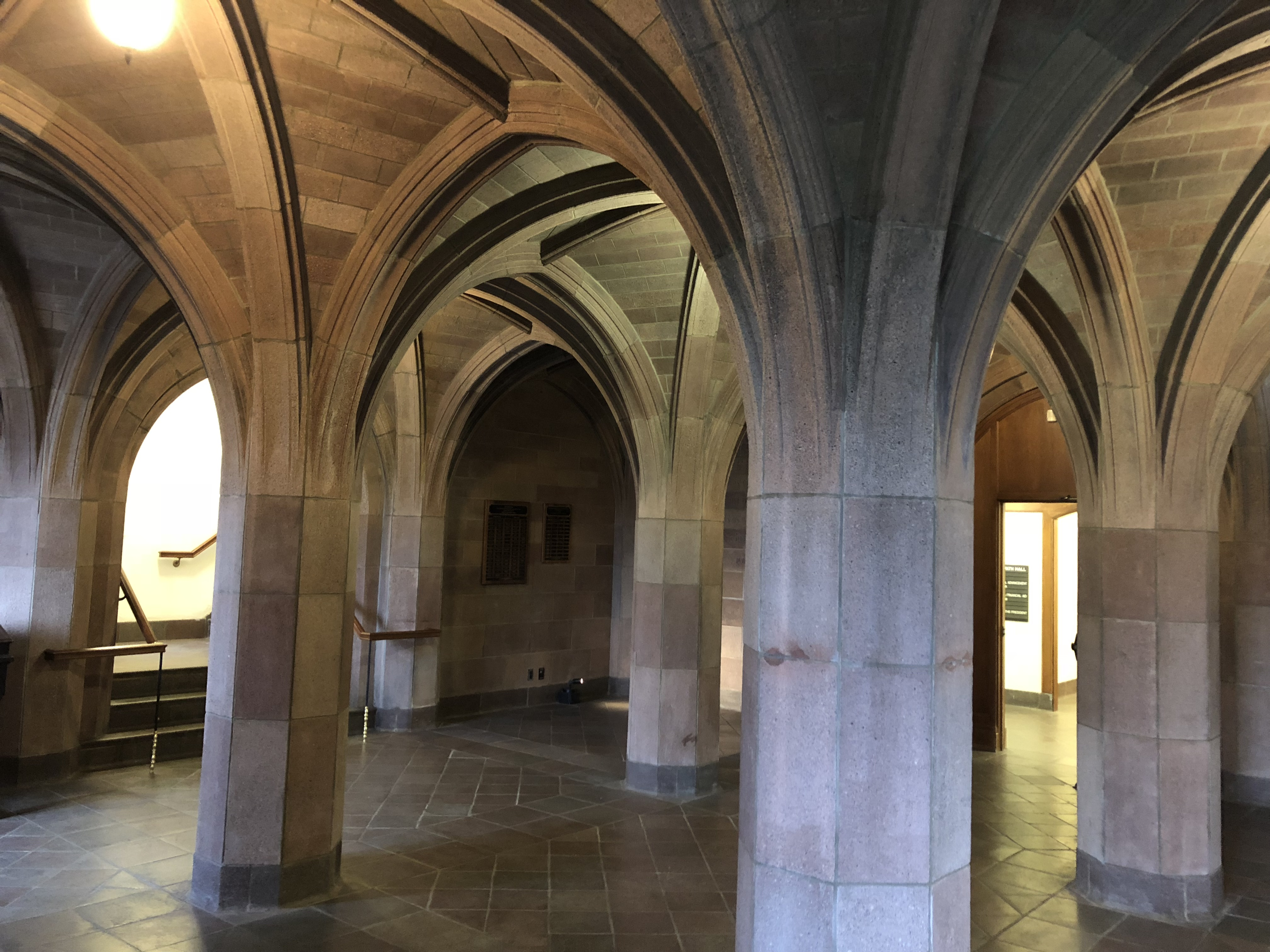
Interior of Cravath Hall

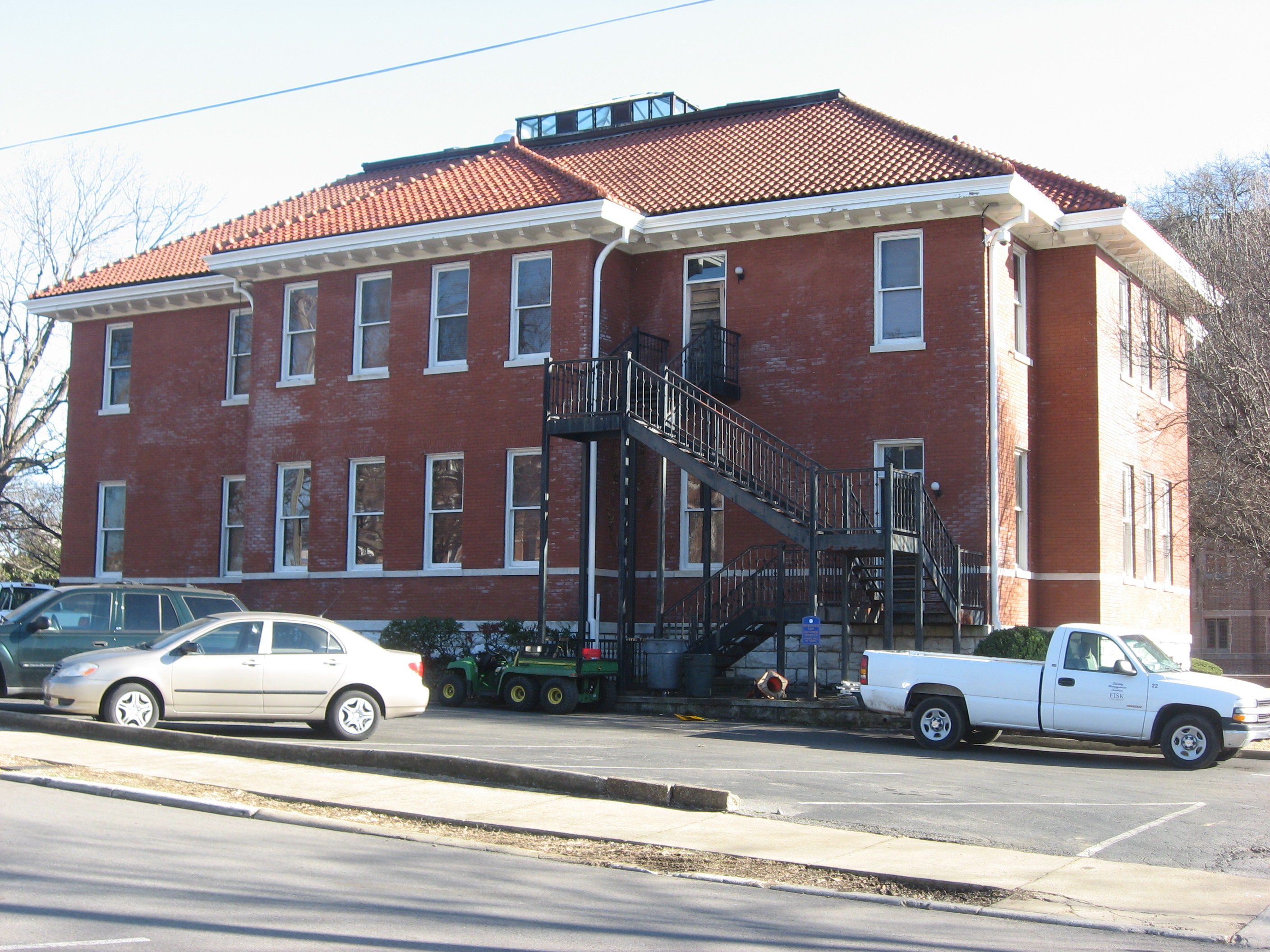
Carnegie Hall

== Music, art, and literature collections ==
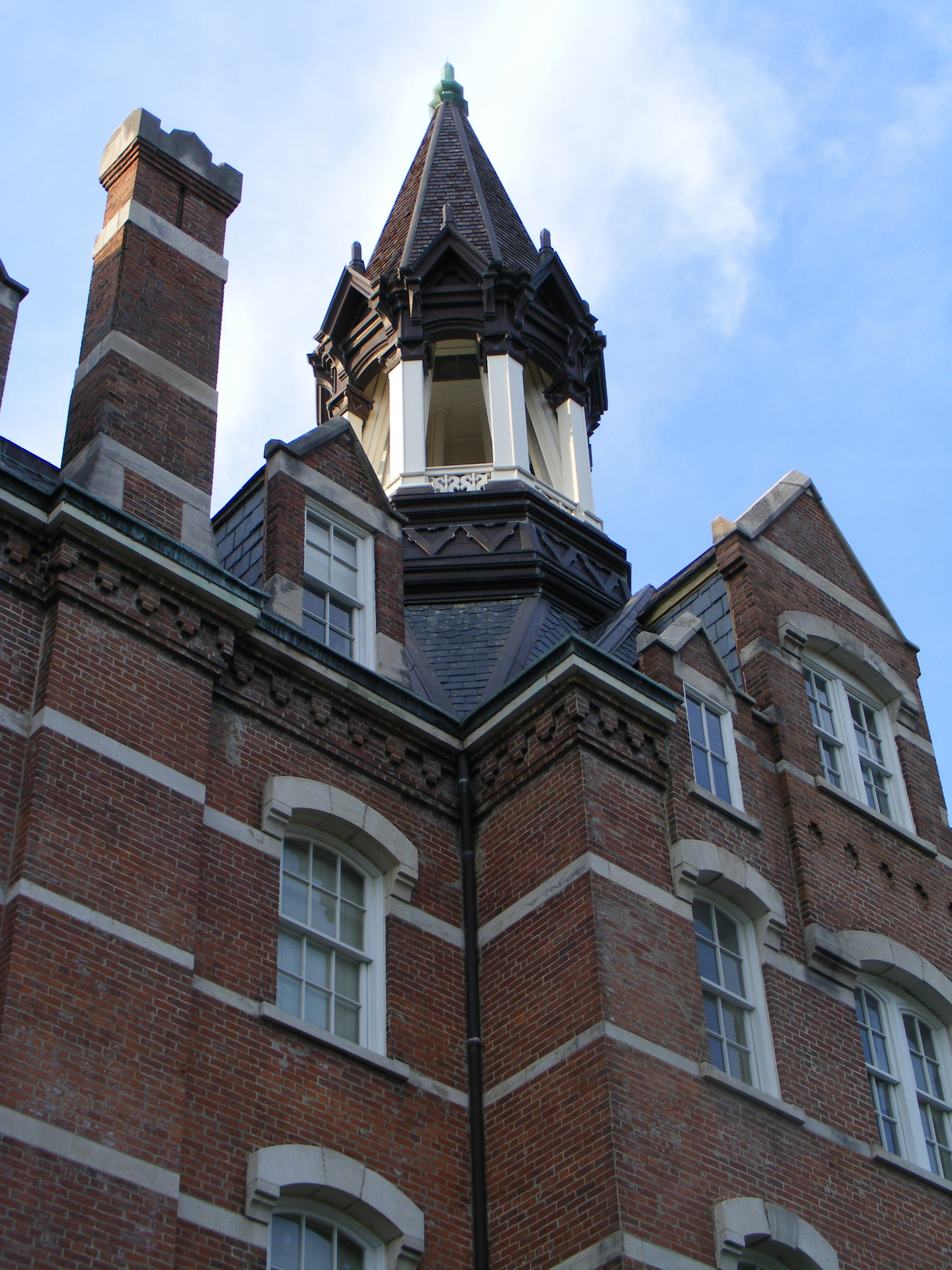
Jubilee Hall

=== Library collections ===
Fisk is the home of a music literature collection founded by the noted Harlem Renaissance figure Carl Van Vechten, for whom the campus museum is named. It also holds a substantial collection of materials associated with Charles W. Chesnutt.

=== Aaron Douglas murals ===
Harlem Renaissance painter Aaron Douglas was commissioned to paint murals for the new campus library, Cravath Hall, in 1930. Douglas described them a "panorama of the development of Black people in this hemisphere, in the new world." Douglas returned to Fisk in 1939 to teach and later served as chair of the art department. The murals were restored in 2003.

=== Alfred Stieglitz collection ===
In 1949, Georgia O'Keeffe, wife and executrix of her late husband's estate, in accordance with the terms of his will, donated to Fisk a number of paintings that had belonged to her husband, the photographer and art patron Alfred Stieglitz. The collection consists of 101 works by important artists, including European modernists Paul Cézanne, Pierre-Auguste Renoir, Pablo Picasso and Diego Rivera, as well as American artists Marsden Hartley, Arthur Dove and Charles Demuth and works by O'Keeffe.

In 2005, mounting financial difficulties and deteriorating conditions in the gallery led the trustees to vote to sell two of the paintings, O'Keeffe's "Radiator Building" and Hartley's "Painting No. 3," together estimated to be worth up to $45 million U.S. The sale was challenged by the Georgia O'Keeffe Museum, the legal guardians of her estate. This challenge failed. A joint agreement was established between Fisk University and the Crystal Bridges Museum of American Art. The two museums now share the works' presentation and display rights of the Stieglitz collection; ownership remains with Fisk University, in accord with the terms of Stieglitz's estate. Presentation and display rights rotate between Fisk University and Crystal Bridges Museum every two years. In 2016, as part of the institution's sesquicentennial celebration, the collection was displayed at the newly renovated Carl Van Vechten Gallery.

== Science programs ==
=== Fisk-Vanderbilt Bridge Program ===
Started in 2004, the Fisk-Vanderbilt bridge program helps underrepresented groups gain access to PhD programs in STEM fields. The partnership between a small, historically black college and a major research university aims to diversify doctoral study. The program, which has received money from NASA, the National Science Foundation, and the Integrative Graduate Education and Research Traineeship, provides a scholarship for a master's degree at Fisk University and close mentorship for students who go on to a PhD Since 2004, 21 students in the program have completed a PhD, with another 56 currently pursuing graduate study. The program has a success rate far higher than the national average for completion of PhD programs, which is about 50%.

== Rankings ==
Academic rankings

Liberal arts
- U.S. News & World Report: 171–221
- Washington Monthly: 199

National
- Forbes: 642

- For 2021, U.S. News & World Report ranked Fisk University tenth among 79 historically black colleges and universities in the U.S., tied for 29th for "Most Innovative Schools", tied for 126th for "Top Performers on Social Mobility" and 171–221 overall among national liberal arts colleges.
- For 2020, Washington Monthly ranked Fisk 199th among 218 liberal arts colleges in the U.S. based on its contribution to the public good, as measured by social mobility, research, and promoting public service.
- Forbes ranks Fisk 642nd on its 2019 "America's Top Colleges" list of 650 colleges, universities, and service academies.

== Athletics ==
The Fisk athletic teams are called the Bulldogs. The institution is a member of the National Association of Intercollegiate Athletics (NAIA), primarily competing in the HBCU Athletic Conference (HBCUAC), formerly the Gulf Coast Athletic Conference (GCAC), since the 2021–22 academic year; which they were a member on a previous stint from 2010–11 to 2013–14. The Bulldogs previously competed as an NAIA Independent within the Association of Independent Institutions (AII) from 2014–15 to 2020–21 (which they were a member on a previous stint from 2008–09 to 2009–10); in the defunct Great South Athletic Conference (GSAC) of the NCAA Division III ranks from 1999–2000 to 2005–06; in the D-III Southern Collegiate Athletic Conference (SCAC) from 1983–84 to 1993–94; and in the Southern Intercollegiate Athletic Conference (SIAC) from 1913–14 to 1982–83, which is currently an NCAA Division II athletic conference.

Fisk competes in 14 intercollegiate varsity sports: Men's sports include basketball, cross country, golf, soccer and track and field (indoor and outdoor); while women's sports include basketball, cross country, golf, gymnastics, tennis, track and field (indoor and outdoor) and volleyball. In 2022, Fisk became the first HBCU to officially add a competitive women's gymnastics team, however the program will disband after the 2025-2026 season due to financial concerns at the institution. Club sports include cheerleading and dance.

== Notable faculty ==
Name	Department	Notability	Reference
Camille Akeju	Art	Art historian and museum administrator	
Ebenezer Ako-Adjei	African studies	Ghanaian politician and founding member of the United Gold Coast Convention	
Arna Bontemps	Librarian	Head librarian and Harlem Renaissance poet	
Miriam Eliza Carey	Librarian	teacher	
Minnie Lou Crosthwaite		teacher, college administrator, activist	
Aaron Douglas	Art	Harlem Renaissance painter, illustrator, and muralist	
Nelson Fuson	Physics	Physics professor, Quaker activist	
Robert Hayden		United States Poet Laureate (1976–1978)	
Charles Spurgeon Johnson	President, Research	First African-American president of Fisk University	
James Weldon Johnson	Literature	Author, poet, and civil rights activist; wrote the poem on which the song "Lift Ev'ry Voice and Sing" is based (also known as the Black national anthem)	
Thomas Elsa Jones	President	Fifth president of Fisk University	
Percy Lavon Julian	Chemistry	Chemist and second African-American member of the National Academy of Sciences	
Anne Gamble Kennedy	Music	Concert pianist, piano professor, and accompanist for the Fisk Jubilee Singers	
Matthew Kennedy	Music	Concert pianist, piano professor, and director of the Fisk Jubilee Singers (1957–1986 intermittently)	
John Oliver Killens	Writer in Residence	Two-time Pulitzer Prize nominee	
Lee Lorch	Mathematics	Mathematician and civil rights activist. Fired in 1955 for refusing to testify before the House Un-American Activities Committee.	
Hazel R. O'Leary	President	First woman and first African-American U.S. Secretary of Energy; fourteenth president of Fisk University	
Helen Clarissa Morgan	Latin	First woman to be appointed professor of Latin (1869–1907) at a coeducational college	
Robert E. Park	Sociology	Sociologist of the Chicago School	
Jessie Carney Smith	Librarian	Head librarian and scholar	
John W. Work III	Music	Choir director, ethnomusicologist, and scholar of Afro-American folk music	
