= The Truth About Christmas =

Studio album by Vanessa Bell Armstrong
- Released: 1990
- Genre: Christmas, gospel, R&B
- Length: 41:05
- Label: Jive/Verity
- Producer: Loris Holland

Vanessa Bell Armstrong chronology
Wonderful One (1988)	The Truth About Christmas (1990)	Something on the Inside (1993)

Professional ratings
Review scores
Source	Rating
Allmusic	2/5 stars

The Truth About Christmas is the sixth studio album by gospel singer Vanessa Bell Armstrong, released in 1990 on Jive Records. The album received a Grammy nomination for Best Traditional Soul Gospel Album.

== Critical reception ==
Bradley Torreano of AllMusic, in a 2/5 star review, remarked "Vanessa Bell Armstrong is one of the many gospel artists to try their hands at a Christmas album. Despite her excellent voice and obvious talents, that still does not save The Truth About Christmas".

== Track listing ==
No.	Title	Writer(s)	Length
1.	"Holy Prelude"	Loris Holland	0:58
2.	"O Holy Night"	Adolphe Adam, John Sullivan Dwight	6:20
3.	"Joy to the World"	Lowell Mason, Isaac Watts	1:43
4.	"Joy"	Traditional	4:14
5.	"Sermon"	Rev. Jesse Bell of Mount Everett Church, Detroit, Michigan	4:32
6.	"The Truth About Christmas"	Loris Holland, Jeau Frierson	4:40
7.	"Medley: 'Away in a Manger'/'Silent Night'/'O Come All Ye Faithful'"	Traditional	4:32
8.	"Christ the Lord"	Traditional	4:28
9.	"The Little Drummer Boy"	Traditional	4:42
10.	"Go Tell It on the Mountain"	John W. Work	4:56
