= Wade in the Water =

African-American spiritual

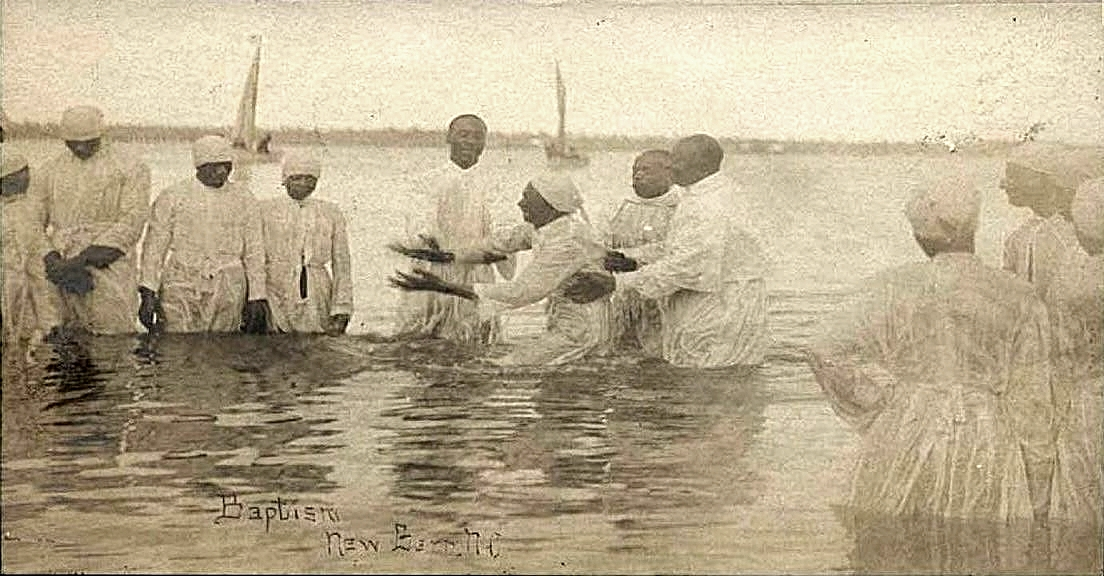
- River baptism in North Carolina c. 1910

Song
- Published: 1901 New Jubilee Songs
- Genre: Spiritual
- Songwriter: Unknown
- Composer: unknown

"Wade in the Water" is an African-American spiritual, the lyrics of which were first co-published in 1901 in New Jubilee Songs as Sung by the Fisk Jubilee Singers by Frederick J. Work and his brother, John Wesley Work Jr. The Sunset Four Jubilee Singers made the first commercial recording of "Wade in the Water" in 1925, released by Paramount Records. The song is also associated with songs of the Underground Railroad.

== Fisk Jubilee Singers ==
John Wesley Work Jr. (1871–1925)—also known as John Work II—spent three decades at the historically black college in Nashville, Tennessee, Fisk University, collecting and promulgating the "jubilee song craft" of the original Fisk Jubilee Singers—an African-American a cappella Fisk University student chorus (1871–1878), known for introducing a wider audience to spirituals. In 1901, Work II co-published New Jubilee Songs as Sung by the Fisk Jubilee Singers with his brother, Frederick J. Work, which included "Wade in the Water." Trademarks of the John Work II's Fisk singers included the "closing ritard that showcases the beauty and blending of the voices", the "solo call and unison response, overlapping layers, and spine-tingling falsetto humming."

Ella Sheppard, one of the original Fisk Jubilee Singers—who also composed and arranged music—explained how slave songs were not part of the Singers' repertoire at first because they, "were sacred to our parents, who used them in their religious worship and shouted over them." Shephard said that, "It was only after many months that gradually our hearts were opened to the influence of these friends and we began to appreciate the wonderful beauty and power of our songs." Frederick Douglass described slave songs as telling a "tale which was then altogether beyond my feeble comprehension; they were tones, loud, long and deep, breathing the prayer and complaint of souls boiling over with the bitterest anguish. Every tone was a testimony against slavery, and a prayer to God for deliverance from chains… Those songs still follow me, to deepen my hatred of slavery, and quicken my sympathies for my brethren in bonds." In his seminal 1903 book, The Souls of Black Folk, W. E. B. Du Bois dedicated a chapter to what he called the "Sorrow Songs"—describing them as African America's "greatest gift" and the "singular spiritual heritage of the nation."

The original Fisk Jubilee Singers had toured to raise funds for the university, with its first tour taking place on what is now called Jubilee Day—October 6, 1871. The first audiences were small, local, and skeptical, but by 1872, they performed at Boston's World Peace Festival and at the White House, and in 1873 they toured Europe. In 1878 the original Fisk Jubilee Singers had disbanded, but in 1890 their legacy was revived when Ella Sheppard Moore returned to Fisk and began to coach new jubilee vocalists, including Work II. In 1899, Fisk University president E. M. Cravath put out a call for a mixed (male and female) jubilee singers ensemble that would tour on behalf of the university. The full mixed choir became too expensive to tour, and was replaced by John Work II's male quartet. The quartet received "widespread acclaim" and eventually made a series of best-selling recordings for Victor in December 1909, February 1911, for Edison in December 1911, for Columbia is October 1915 and February 1916, and Starr in 1916.

In the year that Work died, 1925, the first commercial recording of the song—performed by the Sunset Four Jubilee Singers—was released by Paramount Records.

In his 1925 book, Crisis, W. E. B. Du Bois mentioned "Wade in the Water" as performed by the Norfolk Jubilee Quartet. DuBois wrote that "You'll never tire of the melodious rich blended voices of the Norfolk Jubilee Quartet, Sunset Four, and Harrod's Jubilee Singers."

== Lyrics ==
The lyrics were first published in 1901 in New Jubilee Songs as Sung by the Fisk Jubilee Singers.

Wade in the water, children
Wade in the water
God's gonna trouble the water
God's gonna trouble the water
Wade, wade, wade, wade, wade, wade,
in the water.

There have been a number of subsequent publications with variations on the lyrics. In James W. Johnson's 1926 The book of American Negro spirituals, the song is entitled, "God's A-gwineter Trouble De Water" and the first line is "Wade in de water, children."

A 1956 version from Kentucky and Tennessee begins with "Oh see that man dressed in white", according to the Roud Folk Song Index. According to Olivia and Jack Solomon's 1991 Honey in the Rock a 1930s version from Sumter County, Alabama, gives the title as "God Gonna Trouble the Water" and the first line as, "I'm er wading, I'm er wading in the water, chillun."

In Alan Lomax and Peggy Seeger's 1960 Folk Songs of North America, the first line of the song is "'Member one thing an' it's certainly sho.'"

Others include Marie Boette's 1971 Singa Hipsy Doodle: And Other Folk Songs of West Virginia, Fred and Irwin Silber's 1973 Folksinger's Wordbook, Patrick Ward Gainer's 1975 anthology Folk Songs from the West Virginia Hills which has been republished in 2017, Hazel Arnett's 1975 I hear America singing!: great folk songs from the revolution to rock, the 1992 Slave Songs of the Georgia Sea Islands under the title "Wade in nuh Watuh Childun", and Gwendolin Warren's 1998 Every Time I Feel The Spirit.

== Interpretations of the lyrics ==
Fisk University was founded by the American Missionary Association. Many of the songs in the original Fisk Jubilee Singers songbooks dealt with themes from both the Old and New Testament. According to a 2002 article written by Dave Watermulder, J. Amber Hudlin, and Ellie Kaufman at George Washington University, the song reflects the Israelites' escape out of Egypt as found in Exodus.

According to a 2007 anthology by California State University in Fresno, the singer "warns of the coming signs of the end" but says the "victory of Heaven over Hell" is assured, and "looks forward to future freedom."

Some authorities have connected the lyric "God's gonna trouble the water" to the account of a miraculous healing by Jesus in the New Testament Gospel of John in chapter 5, verses 1-9. In the King James Version of the Bible, a sick man tells Jesus that he is unable to get cured in the pool of Bethesda (or Beth-zatha) because he cannot get into the water quickly enough when it is "troubled," that is, stirred up or agitated (verse 7). Verse 4, now considered an interpolation by many modern scholars, says: "For an angel went down at a certain season into the pool, and troubled the water: whosoever then first after the troubling of the water stepped in was made whole of whatsoever disease he had."

Howard Thurman, American minister, theologian, and professor at Howard University and Boston University, wrote that this New Testament account was the source of the 'troubled waters' lyric in "Wade in the Water": "No one knew precisely when the waters [of Beth-zatha] would be troubled; one could only wait and trust that at the miracle moment there would be someone to ease his tortured body beneath the healing waters. This is in essence the story of the man beside the pool in the fifth chapter of the Gospel according to St. John. [In the song] ...the 'troubled waters' meant the ups and downs, the vicissitudes of life. Within the context of the 'troubled' waters of life there are healing waters, because God is in the midst of the turmoil... This is the message of the spiritual. Do not shrink from moving confidently out into choppy seas. Wade in the water, because God is troubling the water."

== Songs of the Underground Railroad ==
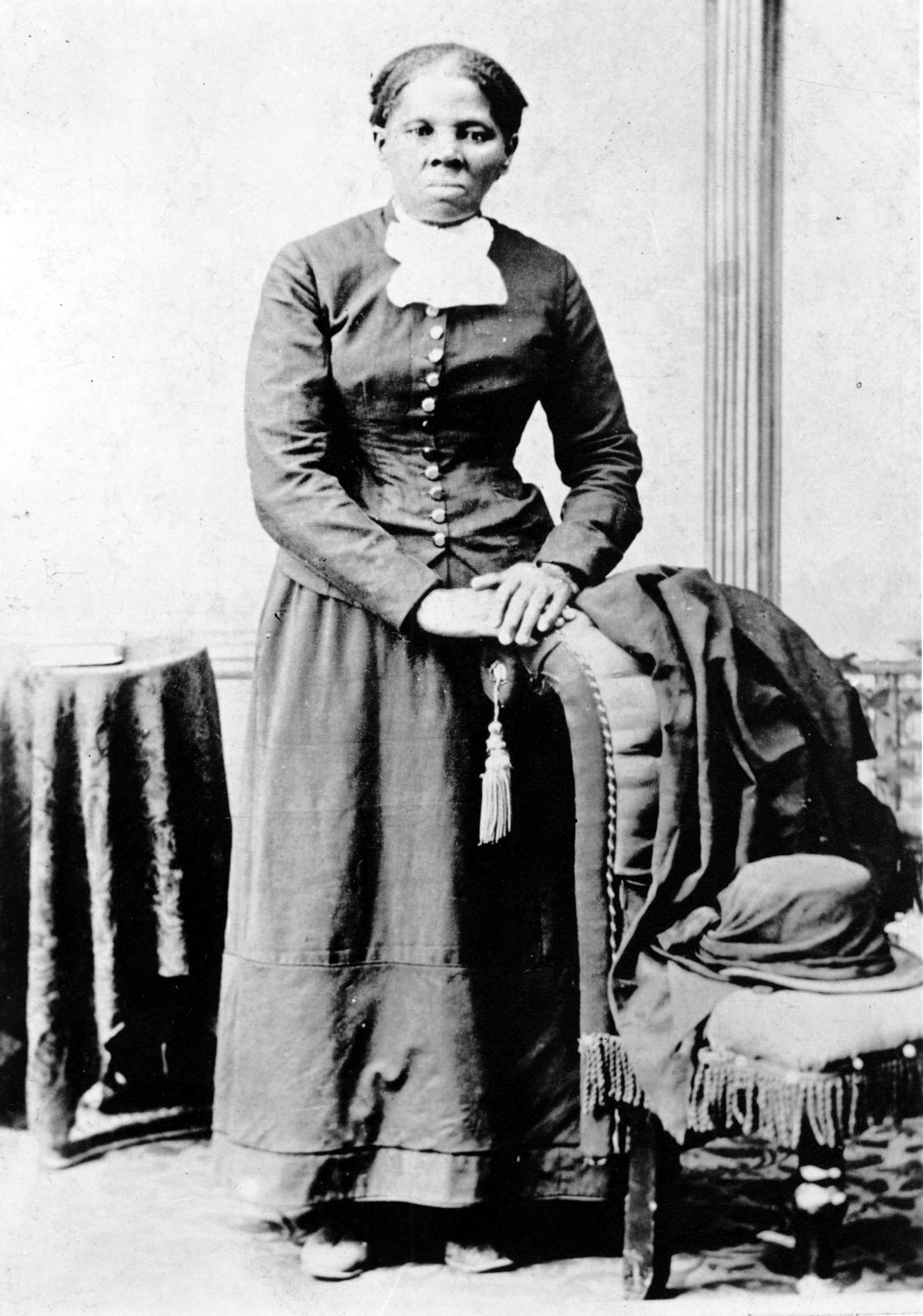
Harriet Tubman c. 1870. Photo by H. B. Lindsley.

According the PBS Newshour—while it "has not been proven, it is believed"—that "Wade in the Water" was one of the songs associated with the Underground Railroad—a network of secret routes and safe houses used by slaves in the United States to find freedom.

It is believed that Harriet Tubman, who made thirteen trips to the South and helped free more than 70 people, used this song to warn slaves to get off the trail and into the water to prevent dogs—used by the slavers—from finding them.

In 1993, Arthur C. Jones—a University of Denver Professor in the Musicology, Ethnomusicology and Theory Department, published the first edition of this book, Wade in the water: the wisdom of the spirituals. Jones established "The Spirituals Project" in 1998 at the university's Lamont School of Music, to preserve and revitalize the "music and teachings of the sacred folk songs called spirituals"—"created and first sung by African Americans in slavery." Jones referenced "Wade in the water" in describing how Harriet Tubman and others improvised on "already existing spirituals", employing them "clandestinely in the multilayered struggle for freedom." The songs reference from God, “troubling the water” comes from Book of John, however the enslaved people created a double meaning that carried both faith and spiritual meaning.

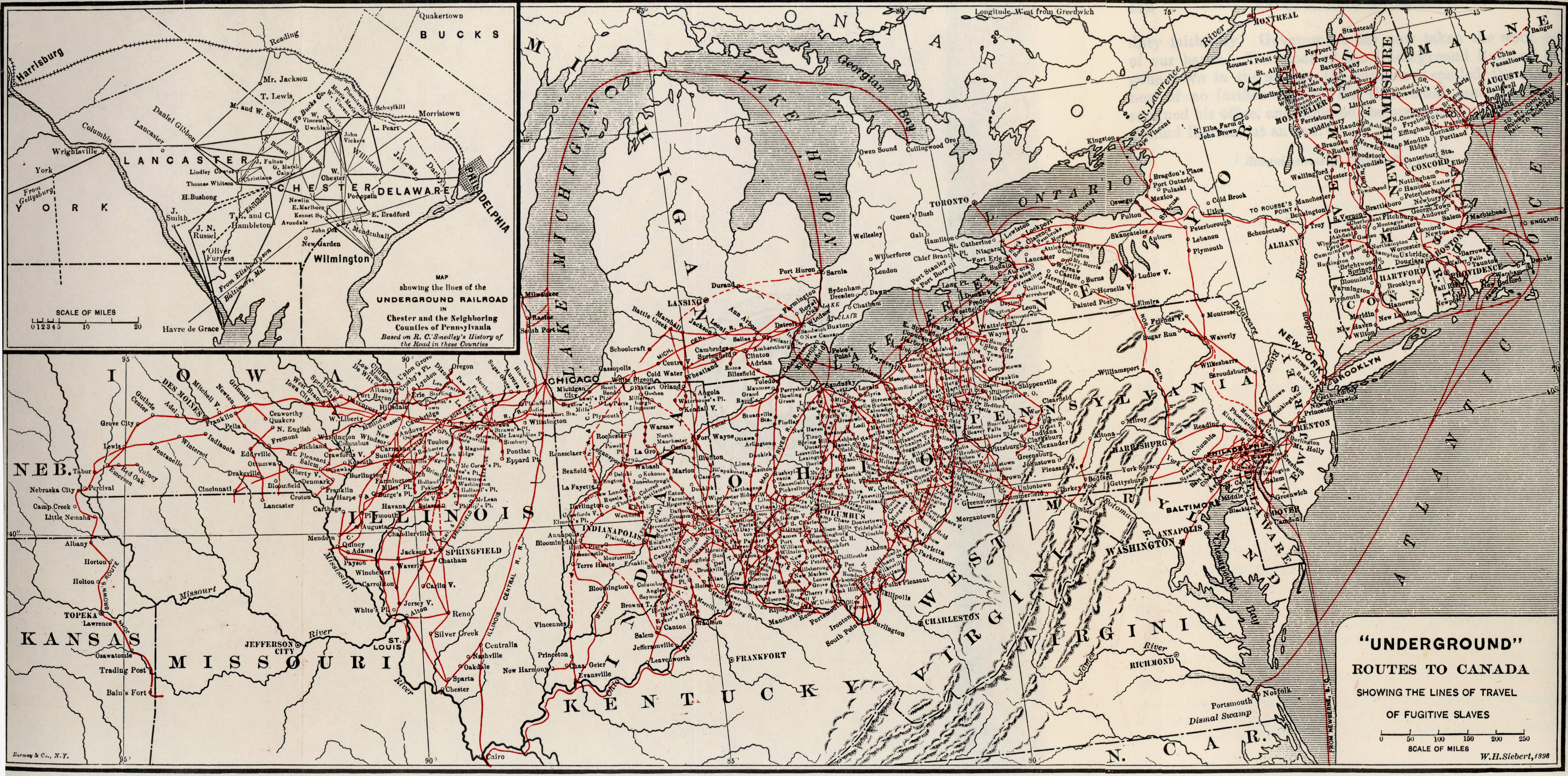
A map of the layout of the Underground Railroad.

In 2002, Maryland Public Television in collaboration with the Maryland Historical Society and Maryland State Archives, produced "Pathways to Freedom: Maryland and the Underground Railroad" as a teaching guide, which included a section on how songs that many slaves knew had "secret meanings" that they could be "used to signal many things." They cited the example of Harriet Tubman using "Wade in the Water" to "tell escaping slaves to get off the trail and into the water to make sure the dogs slavecatchers used couldn’t sniff out their trail. People walking through water did not leave a scent trail that dogs could follow." Certain songs were believed to have contained explicit instructions to fugitive slaves on how to avoid capture and the route to take to successfully make their way to freedom.

The song was included in the 1968 compilation, Freedom is a constant struggle: songs of the freedom movement.

== Performances and recordings ==
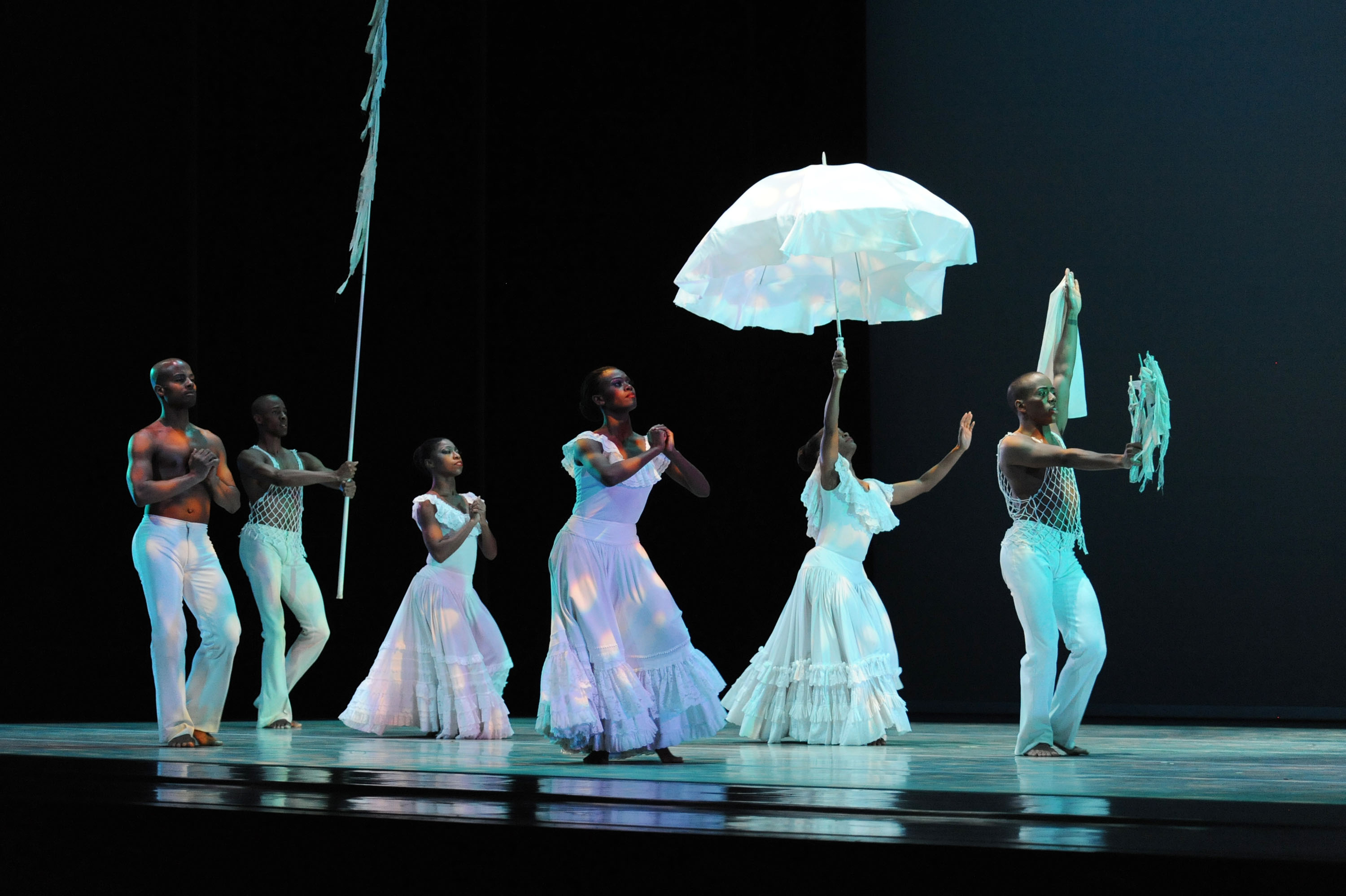
Alvin Ailey American Dance Theater (2011)

Paramount produced a commercial recording of the song by Sunset Four Jubilee Singers in 1925, another by the Lincoln Four Quartette in 1928, a third by Birmingham Jubilee Quartet in 1930, and a fourth by the Famous Blue Jay Singers of Birmingham in 1932. In 1929, the Empire Jubilee Quartet recorded the song with Victor. Fannie Lou Hamer, and Timothy Hays and Group also produced well-known versions of the song according to the University of Tennessee's Library of Music.

In 1960, the Alvin Ailey American Dance Theater performed their signature ballet Revelations, in which "Take me to the Water" was partially set to the spiritual "Wade in the Water" .

The Staple Singers performed their version of song that became a part of the civil rights movement in the United States.

Bob Dylan's Minnesota Hotel Tape (December 22, 1961) performance of the song, likely based on the Staples Singers' rendition, was released as part of the historic 1969 Great White Wonder bootleg.

Folk singer Judy Henske (1937-4/27/2022) sings it in the 1963 film Hootenanny Hoot.

In 1966, Ramsey Lewis Trio's rendition of "Wade in the Water" was a popular instrumental hit, reaching #19 on the Hot 100. In Canada, it reached #32 and #31 in the UK.

In 1967 Herb Alpert and the Tijuana Brass and Billy Preston published their instrumental versions of the song.

In 1969 The Chambers Brothers recorded a combination studio and live from the Fillmore East album - Love, Peace and Happiness. "Wade in the Water" (arr. Joseph Chambers) is the first track on the live side.

In 1970, Clover covered the song for their debut album.

The Black women's a cappella group, Sweet Honey in the Rock, has sung renditions of Wade in the Water, including their 1987 live concert recording at Carnegie Hall in New York City.

The melody was used for the 1988 Tony! Toni! Toné! hit "Little Walter."

Eva Cassidy included a soft, jazz and blues inspired version on her album Songbird. It was released through Blix Street on May 19, 1998, two years after her death in 1996.

In a 1996 album Steal Away by Charlie Haden and Hank Jones, which was reviewed by the New Yorker, Whitney Balliett as the best of the CDs at that time, Balliett said that—while, most of the numbers were "played straight but with the harmonic and rhythmic inflections that separate jazz from the rest of music"—on "Wade in the Water", however, Jones improvise[d] delicately."

The Fisk Jubilee Singers performed at the Apollo Theater in New York—a well-known venue for African-American musicians—to a group of high school students in 2000. Normally the choir, use "few blues inflections or modern gospel melismas", but when they "did allow some in Wade in the Water, there was applause."

In 2001, Mary Mary covered the song for their debut album, Thankful.

A soul-jazz instrumental version of "Wade in the Water" by Hammond organist, James Simpson, appears on his 2003 album, Soul Revival.

Wade in the Water, Children is a 2008 American documentary film directed and produced by Elizabeth Wood and Gabriel Nussbaum. It was filmed by a group of 8th grade students at the first school to reopen in New Orleans in the aftermath of Hurricane Katrina. The film offers a look into life as a child in the ruined city. The film was praised as "scalding stuff" by Newsday, and won the audience award at the New Orleans International Human Rights Film Festival.

The version by Golden Gate Quartet appears on the 2009 compilation album Bad Seeds – Nick Cave: Roots & Collaborations.

The Migration: Reflections on Jacob Lawrence (first performance: 2011) by dance company Step Afrika! includes a Suite ("The Wade Suite") influenced by the song.

Savant released an electronic dance music version of the song on his 2013 album Overkill, sampling Eva Cassidy's cover.

On May 3, 2019, the Fisk Jubilee Singers sang "Wade In the Water" in a live performance at the Grand Ole Opry House in Nashville, Tennessee during the Barbershop Harmony Society Midwinter Convention.

In 2019 Tazewell Thompson presented an cappella musical entitled, Jubilee, that is a tribute to the Fisk Jubilee Singers. The song "Wade in the Water" underscores a scene against the backdrop of a ship returning to America.

"Stand Up" is a song from the 2019 motion picture Harriet, that references the song in the line "I'm wading through muddy waters." That line could also be a reference to Muddy Waters, one of the most famous blues singers.

In February 2020, the Trouble the Water album was released—a full-length album of civil-rights themed music which included "Wade in the Water" performed by Baltimore composer/performer Woody Lissauer, who was at Ground zero during the 2015 Baltimore protests.

Billy Valentine released a version of the song on his 2023 album Billy Valentine & The Universal Truth.

The 2025 Musical Mexodus includes a song titled "Wade in the Water Remix".
