= Desire of My Heart: Live in Detroit =

Desire Of My Heart: Live In Detroit

Live album by Vanessa Bell Armstrong
- Released: 1998
- Genre: Gospel, R&B
- Label: Verity

Vanessa Bell Armstrong chronology
| The Secret Is Out (1995) | Desire Of My Heart: Live In Detroit (1998) | A Brand New Day (2001) |

Professional ratings
Review scores
| Source | Rating |
|---|---|
| AllMusic | 4/5 stars |

Desire Of My Heart is the ninth overall album of gospel singer Vanessa Bell Armstrong. This album continued Armstrong's trend of largely performing traditional gospel songs although she has experienced success as a mainstream gospel artist. Desire features the backing of Pastor Marvin Winans and the Perfecting Praise Choir. An accompanying home video release of the concert was also made available on VHS shortly after the album's release.

== Track listing ==
1. We Sing Glory (5:11)
2. Free (6:56)
3. You Alone Are Worthy (7:58)
4. Desire Of My Heart (6:02)
5. Never Alone (6:58)
6. Grab Hold (4:18)
7. Yes, He Loves Me (6:06)
8. He Is Lord (6:11)
9. Oil of God (10:20)
10. Labor in Vain (3:56)
11. The Classics: Nobody But Jesus/Real/Peace Be Still (Medley) (9:10)
