= Daryl Coley =

American musician (1955–2016)

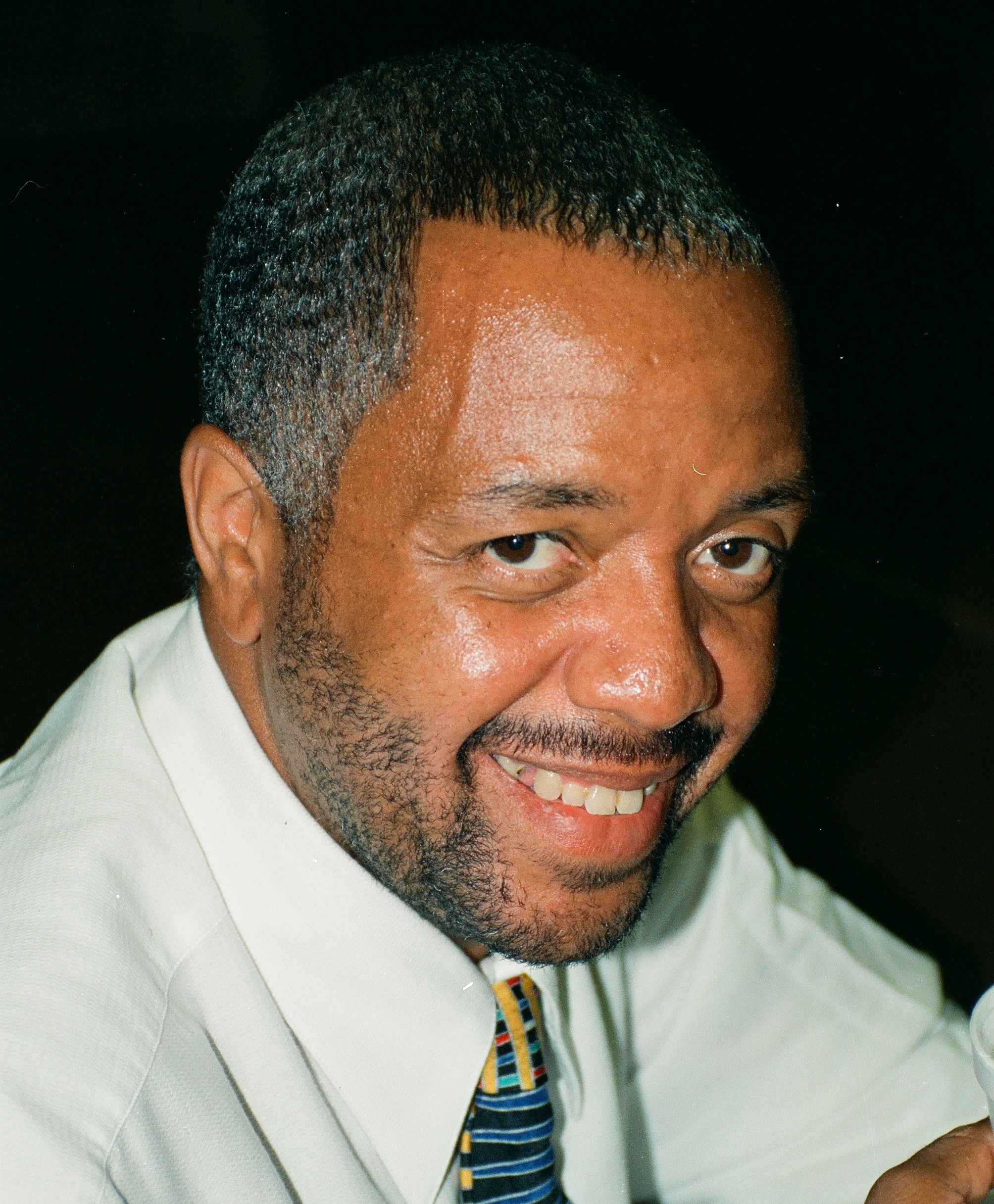
- Coley in 2000

Background information
- Born: Daryl Lynn Coley; October 30, 1955; Berkeley, California, U.S.
- Origin: Oakland, California, U.S.
- Died: March 15, 2016 (aged 60)
- Genres: Gospel, contemporary Christian
- Occupations: Singer, music director, pastor
- Years active: 1977–2016
- Labels: Verity, Sparrow, Light

Daryl Lynn Coley (October 30, 1955 – March 15, 2016) was an American gospel singer, songwriter, musician, and record producer. At 14, Coley was a member of the ensemble "Helen Stephens and the Voices of Christ". He began performing with Edwin Hawkins and the Edwin Hawkins Singers and then worked with James Cleveland, Tramaine Hawkins, Sylvester, Pete Escovedo and others. Albums of his include Just Daryl, He's Right On Time: Live From Los Angeles, When The Music Stops and others.

== Early life ==
Coley was born in Berkeley, California, on October 30, 1955. In his childhood, he sang in the Oakland Children's Chorus, in Oakland, California. His parents separated when he was five years old, with him and his two siblings being raised by his mother in a solid Christian home. Musically, Coley was first influenced by his mother. Daryl stated, "In my house, there was gospel, classical, and jazz. I had that kind of musical influence." During his childhood, he learned to play clarinet and piano.

In 1968, when Edwin Hawkins released "Oh Happy Day", the contemporary arrangement caught Coley's ear. In December 1969, at the age of 13, Coley first heard Helen Stephens And The Voices Of Christ, and by February of the next year he had become a member of the nationally acclaimed ensemble. During his high school years, Coley was a student of Phillip Reeder, Castleers choir director at Castlemont High School. Coley's musical horizons were widened by Reeder, who also encouraged him to enroll in college. As he continued his education in college, Coley's career developed further. He was a top student, was pursuing a business degree, and even helped out with the teaching of college courses.

== Career ==
Coley eventually began performing with Edwin Hawkins in the Edwin Hawkins Singers. He played keyboards for The Hawkins Family from 1977 until he left to collaborate with James Cleveland in 1983. Later, he served as musical director for Tramaine Hawkins when she launched her solo career. Concurrently, Coley branched out in secular circles, singing in jazz clubs, working with artists like Sylvester, Pete Escovedo, and others. He would later collaborate with jazz artists such as Nancy Wilson and Rodney Franklin, and pop artists such as Philip Bailey of Earth, Wind & Fire fame. Coley provided the singing voice of Bleeding Gums Murphy in The Simpsons episode "Dancin' Homer", wherein he performs a comedically over-long version of "The Star-Spangled Banner".

In 1986, Coley released his solo debut album Just Daryl, originally released in 1986 on First Epistle/Plumline Records. The album was nominated for a Grammy award, and was later re-released in 2006. After the success of Just Daryl, he moved to gospel stardom, releasing critically acclaimed albums highlighting his jazz-infused vocal stylings. In 1990, Coley released He's Right On Time: Live From Los Angeles with Sparrow Records, climbing to the #3 spot on the gospel charts. His following album When The Music Stops, released in 1992, reached #1 on the gospel charts.

In 1991, when his albums released under Sparrow Records were achieving national success, Coley fell sick, experiencing flu-like symptoms. When he visited his doctor (more than two weeks later), he was diagnosed with juvenile diabetes, which caused him temporary blindness. He continued to struggle with diabetes.

== Death ==
On March 15, 2016, Daryl Coley succumbed to diabetes and died in hospice care from renal failure. He was 60.

== Discography ==
=== Just Daryl (1986) ===
- Unless otherwise indicated, Information is taken from Allmusic.com

Released in 1986 under the Alliant label, Just Daryl is Coley's debut solo album. It contains Coley's celebrated cover of J.C. White's "II Chronicles," also called This Is the Answer.

1. "Closer" (Jonathan DuBose Jr., Daryl Coley)
2. "II Chronicles" (JC White)
3. "Hang On In There" (Daryl Coley)
4. "Caught Up" (Rickey Grundy)
5. "I've Been Born Again" (Daryl Coley)
6. "Nobody Like the Lord" (Daryl Coley)
7. "Deliverer" (Rev. Quincy Fielding Jr.)
8. "Stand Still and Know" (Walter Hawkins)
9. "Spirit of the Lord (Intro)"
10. "Spirit of the Lord"
11. "Great is Thy Faithfulness"
12. "Hallelujah You're Worthy" (Gary Oliver)

Personnel

- Daryl Coley- Arranger, Lead Vocals, Background Vocals, Grand Piano, Roland Juno 6 Synthesizer
- Gerald Albright- Saxophone Soloist
- Dale Alexander- Background Vocals
- LaShawn N. Baker- Alto Vocals
- Barbara Barrett- Soprano Vocals
- Alisha M. Bass- Soprano Vocals
- Timothy A. Beasley- Choir Director
- D'Wan Bell- Group Member, Tenor Sax
- Beverly Benedict- Tenor Sax
- Shandra Bennett- Soprano Vocals
- Cassandra T. Biles- Soprano Vocals
- Shawana Brown- Alto Vocals
- Dwayne Bryant- Tenor Sax
- Evelyn D. Campbell- Soprano Vocals
- Yvonne Cartwright- Alto Vocals
- Deborah M. Chisom- Alto Vocals
- Erica Chisom- Group Member, Alto Vocals, Tenor Sax
- Shaniqua Chisom- Soprano Vocals
- Paula R. Collick- Alto Vocals
- Deavon Collins- Soprano Vocals
- Renee Craig- Alto Vocals
- Traci M. Craig- Alto Vocals
- Val Craig- Soprano Vocals
- Pamela Crutcher- Alto Vocals
- Leroy Cunningham- Alto Vocals
- Rose Daugherty- Soprano Vocals
- Shawn T. Davis- Tenor Sax
- Wendy Davis- Soprano Vocals
- Donald Dixon- Tenor Sax
- Andy Evans- Tenor Sax
- Rev. Quincy Fielding Jr.- Grand Piano, Hammond Organ
- Typharee Fitzgerald- Alto Vocals
- Rev. Yvette Flunder- Background Vocals
- Kenny Ford- Synthesizer Programming
- Thelma E. Gaskins- Tenor Sax
- Randy D. Gates- Tenor Sax
- Feloy Gibbs- Tenor Sax
- Sheila Gillespie- Alto Vocals
- Carlton Glenn- Tenor Sax
- Andrew Gouche- Bass played by
- Jackie Gouche- Background Vocals
- Felicia Gray- Alto Vocals
- Stephanie A. Green- Alto Vocals
- Rickey Grundy- Grand Piano, Hammond Organ
- James W. Hampton Jr.- Tenor Sax
- Janaar Harbour- Guitar
- Japho Hardin- Tenor Sax
- Henrietta D. Hardin- Soprano Vocals
- Faye Lewis Harper- Soprano Vocals
- Gregory Harris- Tenor Sax
- Walter Hawkins- Background Vocals, Grand Piano,
  Roland Juno 6 Synthesizer
- Harriet M. Hickson- Tenor Sax
- J. J. Hodges- Drums
- James Hodges- Bass played by
- Monica Hollman- Alto Vocals
- Starling Hooks Jr.- Tenor Sax
- Cleshette Hudson- Alto Vocals
- Alma Jackson- Alto Vocals
- Sherrie Kibble- Group Member, Soprano Vocals
- Valencia Knight- Soprano Vocals
- Coreatha Knox- Soprano Vocals
- Priscilla Lewis- Alto Vocals
- Mary Louise L. Lowe- Alto Vocals
- LaVance Madden Jr.- Tenor Sax
- Shawn McClain- Soprano Vocals
- Dietrick McCoy- Tenor Sax
- Erica Miller- Alto Vocals
- Darlena Minor- Alto Vocals
- Kimberly Mont- Alto Vocals
- Samia R. Mosley- Soprano Vocals
- Tiara Murray- Alto Vocals
- Veronica Oatis- Tenor Sax
- Kenny Parker- Background Vocals
- Fran Patterson- Soprano Vocals
- Cheri M. Patton- Soprano Vocals
- Shandra Penix- Group Member, Soprano Vocals
- Rhonda V. Petty- Alto Vocals
- Dawn Pewitt- Alto Vocals
- Wanda Phillips- Tenor Sax
- Celena Pitts- Soprano Vocals
- DeConsalan Polk- Tenor Sax
- Delano Porchia- Tenor Sax
- Grace M. Sawyers- Soprano Vocals
- Lolita Sawyers- Tenor Sax
- Derrick Schoefield- Drums
- Patricia Scott- Soprano Vocals
- Deborah Scruggs- Soprano Vocals
- Ranetta R. Smith- Alto Vocals
- Margaret Steele- Soprano Vocals
- Virgil Straford- Record Producer, Music Director, Piano,
  Organ played by, Strings
- Torria Swanson- Alto Vocals
- Tara Sweat- Alto Vocals
- DeLoris A. Taylor- Soprano Vocals
- Billy Walker Jr.- Tenor Sax
- Nadine D. Walker- Tenor Sax
- Benita Washington- Group Member, Tenor Sax
- Kim Washington- Alto Vocals
- Myron Watkins- Keyboards
- Jomyra Weaver- Tenor Sax
- Antoine Weir- Tenor Sax
- Charles L. Weir- Tenor Sax
- Veronica Whitaker- Alto Vocals
- DeeAnne E. Williams- Alto Vocals
- J. Allen Williams Jr.- Arranger
- Sabrina S. Williams- Soprano Vocals
- Tracy Williams- Alto Vocals
- Latresa Witherspoon- Alto Vocals
- Paul Wright III- Record Producer

=== I'll Be With You (1988) ===
- Information taken from Allmusic.com

Coley's second studio album, I'll Be With You, was released in 1988, originally under the Light Records label and later issued under the CGI label.

1. "The Lord's Name Is To Be Praised" (Daryl Coley)
2. "Worthy Is The Lamb" (Rodney Friend)
3. "That's What You've Done For Me" (Daryl Coley)
4. "Romans 10" (John P. Kee, Daryl Coley)
5. "More Like Jesus" (Daryl Coley)
6. "Jesus Is The Real Thing" (Daryl Coley)
7. "What Moved Him" (Oliver W. Wells)
8. "Hold On Until You Bless Me" (Scott V. Smith, Daryl Coley)
9. "I'll Be With You" (Eric Alphonson, Daryl Coley)

Personnel

- Daryl Coley- Record Producer, Keyboards, Vocal Arrangement,
  Lead Vocals, Background Vocals
- Alex Acuña- Percussion
- Gigi Bailey- Soprano Vocals
- Monica Barker- Production Coordinator
- Darrell Brown- Tenor Vocals
- Meredith Burton-Jeter- Background Vocals
- Roy M. Crayton Jr.- Keyboards
- Charlie Davis- Horn Section
- LaShanna Dendy- Alto Vocals
- Kim Devereaux- Background Vocals
- Delta Dickerson- Background Vocals
- Patricia Finnie- Tenor Vocals
- David Foreman- Guitar
- Rodney Friend- Keyboards
- Ray Fuller- Guitar
- Dean Galbadores- Saxophone Soloist
- Sonya Griffin- Alto Vocals
- Rickey Grundy- Keyboards, Strings
- Victor Harris- Tenor Vocals
- Kim Hutchcroft- Horn Section
- Rhett Lawerence- Synthesizer Programming
- Stephanie Lewis- Alto Vocals
- Debbie McClendon- Background Vocals
- Michelle McNally- Alto Vocals
- Stephen Moore- Tenor Vocals
- Jimmy Neuble- Bass Guitar
- Michael Neuble- Drums
- Nicole Potts- Alto Vocals
- Alfie Silas- Background Vocals
- Shari Simonsen- Strings
- Artis Smith- Soprano Vocals
- Howard Smith- Background Vocals
- Scott V. Smith- Record Producer, Horn Arrangements,
  String Arrangements, Keyboards
- Dayna Stockard- Alto Vocals
- Donald Taylor- Tenor Vocals
- Dorian Taylor- Soprano Vocals
- Ron Taylor- Tenor Vocals
- Felicia Terry- Soprano Vocals
- Lucy Walker- Alto Vocals
- Fred White- Background Vocals
- Roderick White- Background Vocals
- Tony Wilkins- Tenor Vocals

=== He's Right On Time: Live from Los Angeles (1990) ===
- Unless otherwise indicated, Information is based on the Allmusic.com page for this album

Coley's third album, He's Right On Time: Live from Los Angeles, was released under the Sparrow Records label. Notable songs include "I Can't Tell It All," "He's Right On Time" and "I Need Your Spirit".

1. "He Delivered Me (Reprise)" (Rev. Patrick Henderson, Daryl Coley)
2. "The Comforter Has Come" (Scott V. Smith)
3. "By Faith" (Armirris Palmore)
4. "Thy Will Be Done" (Daryl Coley)
5. "I Can't Tell It All" (Rev. Calvin Bernard Rhone)
6. "I Can't Tell It All (Reprise)" (Rev. Calvin Bernard Rhone)
7. "God and God Alone" (Phil McHugh)
8. "He's Right On Time" (Kenny Moore, Rev. Patrick Henderson, Daryl Coley)
9. "Medley: He'll Never Let You Down" (Steve Roberts, Willie Small)
10. "Medley: Keep Moving On/I Need Your Spirit"
  *"Keep Moving On" written by Daryl Coley
  *"I Need Your Spirit" written by Willie Small
11. "You Are My Everything" (Armirris Palmore)
12. "He Delivered Me" (Rev. Patrick Henderson, Daryl Coley)

Personnel

- Daryl Coley- Record Producer, Arranger, Lead Vocals, Clarinet, Piano, Keyboards
- Petra Acrond- Alto Vocals
- Debbie Alexander- Alto Vocals
- Clyde Allen- Baritone Vocals
- Sherron Bennett- Alto Vocals
- Gary Bias- Saxophone
- Jo Bradford Bradley- Soprano Vocals
- Beverly Brown- Soprano Vocals
- Ray Brown- Trumpet
- Vanessa Brown- Acoustic Percussion, Electronic Percussion
- Eric Cayenne Butler- Horn Arrangements, Tenor Vocals,
  Background Vocals
- Roosevelt Christmas III- Tenor Vocals
- Troy Clark- Tenor Vocals
- Larry Coley- (Acoustic) Percussion
- Addie Cox- Soprano Vocals
- Robert Craig- Tenor Vocals
- Roy M. Crayton Jr.- Keyboards
- B. J. Crosby- Additional Vocals
- David Daughtry- Tenor Vocals
- Mittie Dawson-Allen- Soprano Vocals
- Kim Devereaux-Parchman- Alto Vocals, Background Vocals
- Delta Dickerson- Soprano Vocals, Alto Vocals, Tenor Vocals, Background Vocals
- Valerie Doby- Soprano Vocals, Background Vocals
- Debra Edwards- Soprano Vocals
- Dave Foreman- Guitar
- Dave Galbadores- Saxophone
- Mae Gatewood- Alto Vocals
- Rickey Grundy- Synthesizer
- Alexander Hamilton- Choir Director
- Michelle Harris-Watkins- Soprano Vocals
- Cheryl D. Henry- Alto Vocals
- Portia M. Houston- Alto Vocals
- Avon. Hutchinson- Soprano Vocals
- Charles E. Jett II- Tenor Vocals
- Marvin Johnson- Choir Coordinator
- Ray Lamont Jones- Tenor Vocals
- Phil Jordan- Tenor Vocals
- Rickey R. Lee- Tenor Vocals
- Gheri Legree- Alto Vocals
- Stephanie Lewis- Alto Vocals
- Lucretia Massey- Alto Vocals
- Bill Maxwell- Record Producer, Audio Mixing
- Deidre "De De" McRae- Tenor Vocals
- Will Miller- Trumpet
- Tyree Mills- Tenor Vocals
- Phoebe Murray- Alto Vocals
- Jimmy Neuble- Bass played by
- Michael Neuble- Drums
- Jerry Peters- Music Director
- Marlin D. Ricketts- Soprano Vocals
- Hal Sacks- Recording Engineer
- Mark K. Smiley- Tenor Vocals
- Shannon Sterling- Alto Vocals
- Donald W. Taylor- Tenor Vocals
- Dorian Taylor- Alto Vocals
- Ronald B. Taylor- Tenor Vocals
- Derek Turner- Synthesizer
- Le-Morrious Tyler- Choir Coordinator
- Johnetta Williams-Bush- Soprano Vocals
- Reggie C. Young- Trombone

=== When the Music Stops (1992) ===
When the Music Stops is Coley's second live album and his fourth overall. Released in 1992, it is also Coley's second album under Sparrow Records:

1. "You Can Do All Things" (Armirris Palmore)
  *Vocals arranged by Armirris Palmore
2. "Real" (Calvin Bernard Rhone)
  *Flugelhorn: Gary Grant
3. "He'll Make A Way" (Armirris Palmore)
  *Vocals arranged by Armirris Palmore
  *Choir Vocals: Voices of Integrity
  *Choir Coordinator: Keith Washington
  *Music conducted by Alexander Hamilton
4. "Don't Hold Back" (Darnell Givens, Derek Turner)
5. "Jesus Never Fails" (Daryl Coley)
  *Choir Vocals: Voices of Integrity
  *Choir Coordinator: Keith Washington
  *Music conducted by Alexander Hamilton
6. "In Times Like These" (Armirris Palmore)
  *Vocals arranged by Armirris Palmore
7. "When the Music Stops" (V. Michael McKay)
  *Music arranged by V. Michael McKay
8. "It Shall Be Done" (Daryl Coley)
  *Choir Vocals: Voices of Integrity
  *Choir Coordinator: Keith Washington
  *Music conducted by Alexander Hamilton
9. "Integrity" (V. Michael McKay)
  *Music arranged by V. Michael McKay
  *Strings arranged by Mark Gasbarro
  *Choir Vocals: Voices of Integrity
  *Choir Coordinator: Keith Washington
  *Music conducted by Alexander Hamilton

Personnel

- Daryl Coley- Record Producer, Lead Vocals, Vocal arranger
- Bruce Bidlack- Assistant Recording Engineer
- Robert Black- Percussion
- James Brown- Music Director, Keyboards
- Gene Burkert- Saxophone
- Kim Devereaux-Parchman- Background Vocals
- Delta Dickerson- Background Vocals
- Valerie Doby- Background Vocals
- Mark Eshelman- Assistant Recording Engineer
- David Foreman- Guitar
- Dan Fornero- Trumpet
- Ray Fuller- Guitar
- Mark Gasbarro- Keyboards
- Tom Harvey- Assistant Recording Engineer
- Harry Kim- Trumpet
- Jimmy Neuble- Bass played by
- Michael Neuble- Drums
- Donald Patterson- Bass played by
- Robert Reed- Assistant Recording Engineer
- Logan Reynolds- Keyboards
- Hal Sacks- Record Producer, Recording Engineer, Audio Mixing
- Edna Tatum- Narrator
- Efrain Toro- Percussion
- Arturo Velasco- Trombone
- Vine Street Horns- Horns performed by
- Fred C. White- Background Vocals
- Jason White- Keyboards
- Bob Wilson- Horns arranged by

=== In My Dreams (1994) ===
- Information is taken from Allmusic.com

Coley's In My Dreams is fifth studio album. Released under Sparrow Records in 1994:

1. "He That Dwelleth (Psalm 91)" (Armirris Palmore)
2. "Try Me Once Again" (Daryl Coley)
3. "He's Already Forgotten" (Lowell Alexander, Tim Carpenter)
4. "To Live Is Christ" (Kirk Franklin)
5. "Blessed Assurance" (Traditional)
6. "Heart Of The Matter" (Oliver W. Wells, Turner Lawton)
7. "God Is My Strength" (Percy Bady)
8. "You Are The Melody" (Daryl Coley)
9. "You Are My God" (Victor McCoy)
10. "In My Dreams" (V. Michael McKay)

Personnel

- Daryl Coley- Vocals, Clarinet, Piano, Keyboards
- Hal Sacks- Record Producer

=== Beyond the Veil: Live at the Bobby Jones Gospel Explosions XIII (1996) ===
- Information taken from Allmusic.com

Coley's sixth studio album is Beyond the Veil: Live at the Bobby Jones Gospel Explosion XIII. It is also his fourth live album. It was released in 1996 under Sparrow Records, and contains songs such as "Sweet Communion", "Lamb of God", and "Wonderful".

1. "Wonderful" (Daryl Coley)
2. "Lamb of God" (Armirris Palmore)
3. "Sweet Communion" (Daryl Coley)
4. "Standing On The Promises" (Armirris Palmore)
5. "Beyond the Veil" (Daryl Coley)
6. "Nobody Like the Lord" (Armirris Palmore)
7. "So Much" (Armirris Palmore)
8. "We Are One" (Daryl Coley)
9. "What's In Your Name" (V. Michael McKay)
10. "Beyond the Veil (Reprise)" (Daryl Coley)

Personnel

- Daryl Coley- Record Producer, Lead Vocals
- Jenell Alexander- Production Coordinator
- James H. Brown- Music Director, Keyboards
- William Cannon- Choir Vocals
- Denise Chaplin- Choir Vocals
- Mia Clark- Choir Vocals
- Darrell Crooks- Guitar
- Eric Darken- Percussion
- Anthony Davis- Choir Vocals
- Alex Evans- Bass played by
- Carlos Greene- Choir Vocals
- Marc Harris- Organ played by, Horns, Strings
- Wanda Hodge- Choir Vocals
- Stephanie Johnson- Choir Vocals
- Arlando Jones- Choir Vocals
- Denise Jones- Choir Vocals
- Leah Knox- Choir Vocals
- Donald Lawrence- Record Producer
- Bryan Lenox- Overdub Recording Engineer, Overdubs
- Fatina Mallory- Choir Vocals
- Craig Minor- Choir Vocals
- James Moss- Choir Vocals
- Shandra Penix- Choir Vocals
- Chris Randle- Choir Vocals
- Fatima Richardson- Choir Vocals
- Demetria Slayden- Choir Vocals
- Tracey Talley- Choir Vocals
- Evelyn W. Tyler- Choir Vocals
- Fred Vaughn- Keyboards
- Grover Whittington- Choir Vocals
- Jacqueline Whittington- Choir Vocals
- Demetrius A. Williams- Choir Vocals, Valvehorn
- Mark Williams- Recording Engineer, Audio Mixing

=== Live in Oakland-Home Again (1997) ===
- Unless otherwise indicated, Information is taken from Allmusic.com
1. "I Will Bless Your Name" (Daryl Coley)
2. "Don't Give Up On Jesus" (Thomas Whitfield)
3. "Removal of the Mask" (V. Michael McKay)
4. "That Special Place" (Daryl Coley)
5. "His Love" (Russell Watson, Daryl Coley)
6. "Jesus Saves" (James Brown)
7. "I Will Song Glory" (Daryl Coley)
8. "Thank You Lord" (Daryl Coley)
9. "I Can" (Daryl Coley)
10. "What He's Done" (Daryl Coley)
11. "Jesus Loves Me" (Traditional)
12. "Acapella Praise" (Traditional)

Personnel

- Daryl Coley- Record Producer, Clarinet, Piano, Keyboards, Lead Vocals
- Elisa Anderson- Choir Member, Soprano Vocals
- Martha Armstrong- Choir Member, Tenor Vocals
- Cherie Beasley- Choir Member, Tenor Vocals
- Robert Black- Percussion
- William Bolden- Choir Member, Tenor Vocals
- Meryl Borders-Humphrey- Choir Member, Alto Vocals
- Sandy Bradley- Choir Member, Soprano Vocals
- Diane Breaux- Choir Member, Soprano Vocals
- Jeannie Broughton- Choir Member, Soprano Vocals
- James Brown- Record Producer, Keyboards
- Linda Brown- Choir Member, Alto Vocals
- Delores Cannon- Choir Member, Tenor Vocals
- Karen Carter- Choir Member, Alto Vocals
- Jeralyn Crear- Choir Member, Soprano Vocals
- Robin Eldridge- Choir Member, Alto Vocals
- Faye Forney- Choir Member, Soprano Vocals
- Gregory D. Gaines- Choir Member, Tenor Vocals
- Guy Comrad Green- Choir Member, Tenor Vocals
- Derrick Hall- Organ played by
- Harry Hawkins- Choir Member, Tenor Vocals
- Mike Hersey- Recording Engineer
- Thelma Jones- Choir Member, Alto Vocals
- Donald Lawrence- Audio Mixing
- Monique Leonard- Choir Member, Alto Vocals
- Therese Leonard-Young- Choir Member, Soprano Vocals
- Aaron Lopez- Recording Engineer
- DeAnn Lott- Choir Member, Soprano Vocals
- Fredrik Martinsson- Audio Mixing
- Jerry Mitchell- Record Producer, Recording Engineer
- New Generation Singers Reunion Choir- Choir Vocals performed by
- Eunice Parks- Choir Member, Tenor Vocals
- Lillian Parks- Choir Member, Soprano Vocals
- Faith Phifer-Hopkins- Choir Member, Soprano Vocals
- Farnsworth Curtis Reed- Choir Member, Tenor Vocals
- Al Richardson- Recording Engineer
- Joyce Paige Roberson- Choir Member, Soprano Vocals
- Larry Roberson- Choir Member, Tenor Vocals
- Nina Roberson- Choir Member, Alto Vocals
- Frieda Sledge-Glover- Choir Member, Soprano Vocals
- Eric Smith- Bass played by
- Joel Smith- Drums
- John "Jubu" Smith- Guitar
- Marcellos Staples- Choir Member, Tenor Vocals
- Titus Starks- Choir Member, Tenor Vocals
- Donald W. Taylor- Choir Member, Tenor Vocals
- Mildred Holmes Taylor- Choir Member, Soprano Vocals
- Nathaniel Terry- Choir Member, Tenor Vocals
- Rhonda Thompson- Choir Member, Alto Vocals
- Sheila A. Walker-McMullen- Choir Member, Soprano Vocals
- Juanita Waller- Choir Member, Alto Vocals
- Antwon Watson- Choir Member, Soprano Vocals
- O-Keema Watson- Choir Member, Tenor Vocals
- Loretta Watts- Choir Member, Alto Vocals
- Katrina Watts-McFarland- Choir Member, Alto Vocals
- Thaddeus White- Choir Member, Tenor Vocals
- Angela Winding- Choir Member, Alto Vocals
- Marion Witt- Choir Member, Alto Vocals
- Gregory Zeno- Choir Member, Tenor Vocals

=== Christmas is Here (1999) ===
- Information is taken from Allmusic.com
1. "God's Only Son" (Daryl Coley)
2. "It Came Upon a Midnight Clear/Angels We Have Heard on High"
3. "Music Interlude #1" (Daryl Coley)
4. "Emmanuel" (Daryl Coley)
5. "Medley: Carol of the Bells/Silver Bells"
  *"Carol of the Bells" written by Peter J. Wilhousky
  *"Silver Bells" written by Jay Livingston & Ray Evans
6. "Reason for the Season"
7. "Music Interlude #2"
8. "O Come, O Come, Emmanuel/God Rest Ye Merry, Gentlemen"
  (Traditional)
9. "Glory to God" (George Frederick Handel)
10. "Christmas Is Here" (Daryl Coley)
11. "While Shepherds Watched Their Flocks"

Personnel

- Daryl Coley- Record Producer, Lead Vocals
- DeWayne Brown- Tenor Vocals
- Calvin Carter- Drums
- Bill DeLoach- Recording Engineer
- Johnny Dillard- Bass played by
- Jeff Graham- Tenor Vocals
- Ricky Keller- Recording Engineer
- Shelton Morgan- Recording Engineer
- Eric Reed- Keyboards
- Oliver Wells- Keyboards
- Mark Williams- Recording Engineer
- Steve Williams- Tenor Vocals

=== Compositions: A Decade of Song (2000) ===
1. By Faith
2. Wonderful
3. The Comforter Has Come
4. You Are My Everything
5. When Sunday Comes
6. In Times Like These
7. Lamb Of God
8. Standing On The Promises
9. You Can Do All Things

From CD back cover

=== Oh, The Lamb (2001) ===
- Information is taken from Allmusic.com
1. Because He's God (James Brown)
2. (Narration I)
3. II Chronicles (Daryl Coley)
4. He Will Make A Way
5. Lean On Me (Keith Crouch)
6. (Narration II)
7. Exchanged (Daryl Coley)
8. For The Good Of Them (Darius Brooks)
9. Lift Your Name On High
10. (Narration III)
11. Oh, the Lamb (Daryl Coley)
12. Silent Scream
13. I Need You (Daryl Coley)
14. He's Worthy (James Moore, Stephen Williams)
15. He Can Work It Out (Kevin Bond)
16. Praise

Personnel

- Daryl Coley- Record Producer, Lead Vocals
- The Beloved- Additional Music performed by
- Kevin Bond- Record Producer, Music Programming, Keyboards, Background Vocals
- Calvin Carter- Drums
- John Croslan II- Keyboards
- Jeremy Haynes- Drums
- Cynthia Rogers- Background Vocals
- Mark Williams- Recording Engineer

=== Praise & Worship (2006) ===
1. "Thank You Lord" (with New Generation Singers Reunion Choir)
  *Written by Daryl Coley
2. "Because He's God" (James "Razor" Brown)
3. "Nobody Like the Lord" (Daryl Coley)
4. "Praise" (Daryl Coley)
5. "Oh, The Lamb" (Daryl Coley)
6. "He's Worthy" (S. Williams)
7. "God and God Alone" (Phil McHugh)
8. "II Chronicles" (with The Beloved) (Daryl Coley)
9. "Don't Give Up on Jesus" (Thomas Whitfield)
10. "Jesus Saves" (with New Generation Singers Reunion Choir)
  *Written by James "Razor" Brown
11. "The Medley of Praise"
  *Includes "We Exalt Thee", "Welcome into This Place" & "Reign Jesus Reign"
12. "I Will Bless Your Name" (with New Generation Singers Reunion Choir)
  *Written by Daryl Coley
13. "The Lord's Name Is to Be Praised" (Daryl Coley)
14. "Worthy Is the Lamb" (Rodney Friend)

Personnel

- Daryl Coley- Record Producer, Lead Vocals
- The Beloved- Additional Music performed by
- James "Razor" Brown- Record Producer
- Dan Cleary- Record Producer
- Walter Hawkins- Record Producer
- Bill Maxwell- Record Producer
- Jerry Mitchell- Record Producer
- Nedra Olds-Neal- Compilation Producer
- New Generation Singers Reunion Choir-
  Background Vocals performed by
- Scott V. Smith- Record Producer
