= John Wesley Work III =

American classical composer (1901–1967)

- Born: July 15, 1901; Tullahoma, Tennessee, United States
- Died: May 17, 1967 (aged 65)
- Education: Fisk University, Columbia University
- Occupations: Musicologist; composer; educator; choral director; scholar; folklorist
- Known for: Specialist in African American folklore and music
- Parent(s): John Wesley Work, Agnes Haynes Work
- Family: Frederick Jerome Work (uncle), Julian Work (brother)

John Wesley Work III (July 15, 1901 – May 17, 1967) was an American composer, educator, choral director, musicologist and scholar of African-American folklore and music.

== Biography ==
He was born on July 15, 1901, in Tullahoma, Tennessee, to a family of professional musicians. His grandfather, John Wesley Work, was a church choir director in Nashville, where he wrote and arranged music for his choirs. Some of his choristers were members of the original Fisk Jubilee Singers. His father, John Wesley Work, Jr., was a singer, folksong collector and professor of music, Latin, and history at Fisk, and his mother, Agnes Haynes Work, was a singer who helped train the Fisk group. His uncle, Frederick Jerome Work, also collected and arranged folksongs, and his brother, Julian, became a professional musician and composer.

Work began his musical training at the Fisk University Laboratory School, moving on to the Fisk High School and then the university, where he received a B.A. degree in 1923. After graduation, he attended the Institute of Musical Art in New York City (now the Juilliard School of Music), where he studied with Gardner Lamson. He returned to Fisk and began teaching in 1927, spending summers in New York studying with Howard Talley and Samuel Gardner. In 1930 he received an M.A. degree from Columbia University with his thesis American Negro Songs and Spirituals. He was awarded two Julius Rosenwald Foundation Fellowships for the years 1931 to 1933 and, using these to take two years leave from Fisk, he obtained a B.Mus. degree from Yale University in 1933.

Work spent the remainder of his career at Fisk, until his retirement in 1966. He served in a variety of positions, notably as a teacher, chairman of the Fisk University Department of Music, and director of the Fisk Jubilee Singers from 1947 until 1956. He published articles in professional journals and dictionaries over a span of more than thirty years. His best known articles were "Plantation Meistersingers" in The Musical Quarterly (Jan. 1940), and "Changing Patterns in Negro Folksongs" in the Journal of American Folklore (Oct. 1940). In 1953, he was a member of the charter class of the Zeta Rho chapter of Phi Mu Alpha Sinfonia fraternity, the national fraternity for men in music. The Fisk chapter was the third chapter of the Fraternity chartered at a historically black college or university, the first being chartered at Howard University in 1952.

Work began composing while still in high school and continued throughout his career, completing over one hundred compositions in a variety of musical forms—for full orchestra, piano, chamber ensemble, violin and organ—but his largest output was in choral and solo-voice music. He was awarded first prize in the 1946 competition of the Federation of American Composers for his cantata The Singers, and in 1947 he received an award from the National Association of Negro Musicians. In 1963 he was awarded an honorary doctorate from Fisk University.

Following Work's collection Negro Folk Songs, the bulk of which was recorded at Fort Valley, he and two colleagues from Fisk University, Charles S. Johnson, head of the department of sociology (later, in October 1946, chosen as the university's first black president), and Lewis Jones, professor of sociology, collaborated with the Archive of American Folk Song on the Library of Congress/Fisk University Mississippi Delta Collection (AFC 1941/002). This project was a two-year joint field study conducted by the Library of Congress and Fisk University during the summers of 1941 and 1942. The goal of the partnership was to carry out an intensive field study documenting the folk culture of a specific community of African Americans in the Mississippi Delta region. The rapidly urbanizing commercial area of Coahoma County, Mississippi, with its county seat in Clarksdale, became the geographical focus of the study. Some of the correspondence included in this collection between Work and Alan Lomax, then head of the Archive of American Folk Song, touches on both the Fort Valley and the emerging Fisk University recording projects. The legendary Muddy Waters was first recorded as part of this project.

John Wesley Work died on May 17, 1967.

== Musical works ==
- Yenvalou for orchestra (1946)
- Sassafras, pieces for piano (1946)
- Scuppernong (1951)
- Appalachia (1954)
- From the Deep South (1936)
- The Singers, cantatas (1941)
- Isaac Watts Contemplates the Cross (1962)

== Other works ==
Arrangements for S. A. T. B. of several collected Christian folk songs of the 1860s, first appearing in print in the early 1900s, and published in 1948 by Work through 'Galaxy Music Corp', NY. Galaxy Music was sold to E. C. Schirmer Music Company in 1989.

- This Little Light O' Mine with solo unaccompanied
- Jesus, Lay Your Head in the Window for high voice with piano accompaniment
- Done Made My Vow to the Lord for chorus of mixed voices, with tenor
- Go Tell It on the Mountain (Christmas) for mixed voices or junior choir, also versions for treble and male voices
- Little Black Train for chorus of mixed voices, with mezzo-soprano and tenor
- Lord, I'm Out Here on Your Word with tenor voice solo
- Railroad Bill for male chorus
- Listen to the Angels Shouting for women's chorus, with contralto solo

== Other sources ==
- Southern, Eileen. The Music of Black Americans: A History. W. W. Norton & Company; 3rd edition. ISBN 0-393-97141-4
