= Something on the Inside =

Studio album by Vanessa Bell Armstrong
- Released: 1993
- Genre: gospel, R&B
- Length: 43:09
- Label: Jive/Verity
- Producer: Dorsey "Rob" Robinson, Vincent Henry, Vincent Herbert, Carvin Winans, Thomas Whitfield

Vanessa Bell Armstrong chronology
The Truth About Christmas (1990)	Something on the Inside (1993)	The Secret Is Out (1995)

Singles from Something on the Inside
- 1. "Something on the Inside"

Professional ratings
Review scores
Source	Rating
Allmusic	3/5 stars

Something on the Inside is the seventh overall album by gospel singer Vanessa Bell Armstrong, and fourth for major label Jive Records. The title track was released as a single. Something on the Inside reunites Armstrong with longtime collaborator and pacesetting gospel producer Thomas Whitfield. This was Armstrong's last release for the Jive label before being shifted to its gospel sister label Verity Records for 1995's more traditional gospel release The Secret Is Out.

== Track listing ==
1. Something On The Inside (featuring John P. Kee) (4:59)
2. Don't You Give Up (6:59)
3. Everlasting Love (5:48)
4. Ounce Of Your Love (4:39)
5. You Can't Take My Faith Away (4:59)
6. Thank Ya (4:23)
7. Father, I Stretch (5:56)
8. Story Of Calvary (5:26)
