= Vanessa Bell Armstrong =

American gospel singer

- Born: Vanessa Bell; October 2, 1953 (age 72); Detroit, Michigan, U.S.
- Occupation: Gospel singer
- Instruments: Vocals
- Years active: 1968–present

Vanessa Bell Armstrong (née Bell; born October 2, 1953) is an American R&B and gospel singer who released her debut album Peace Be Still in 1983. She is a 7-time Grammy Award nominee, Stellar Award winner, and she won a Soul Train Award. She has worked with many in the industry including Mattie Moss Clark (who helped Armstrong with her career), Daryl Coley, The Clark Sisters, Rance Allen, James Cleveland, and many others. Armstrong (a Detroit native), has an honorary doctorate degree in theology from Next Dimension University, received at the West Angeles Cathedral in Los Angeles in 2017.

== Career ==
When I started out, I was a contemporary vocalist however the late Thomas Whitfield mixed it up with a traditional feel and since then I never went far from that... I love the contemporary and I love the traditional... to me the time-honored sounds of Gospel music is our medicine... it gives us hope... it encourages, but the contemporary-up tempo stuff is what lifts us up. It all works together.

— Vanessa Bell Armstrong

Her father was the pastor at Greater Mount Everett Church of God in Christ in Detroit Michigan Ferndale south of Royal Oak, Michigan. Vanessa directed the choir and sang in it.

Vanessa Armstrong made her solo debut on Onyx/Muscle Shoals Sound Records in 1983 with the album Peace Be Still. The title track became one of Armstrong's signature songs. Her second album Chosen was number one on the US Billboard Top Gospel Albums chart. She performed on the 1st Annual Soul Train Awards ceremony. Her 1986 album Following Jesus won a Soul Train Music Award for Best Gospel Album – Solo in 1988. She is also a seven time Grammy Award-nominee.

Armstrong enjoyed a bit of mainstream success in the late 1980s. Her self-titled 1987 Jive Records debut had the Billboard-charting hit "You Bring Out The Best in Me," as well as the club favorite "Pressing On." In the next year a follow-up album Wonderful One featured a cover of the Labi Siffre anti-Apartheid anthem "Something Inside So Strong." Armstrong along with Shirley Caesar, Fred Hammond, Tramaine Hawkins, Yolanda Adams, and other gospel artists remade the song in 1995 as a tribute to Rosa Parks, the civil rights activist. The song was sent to radio stations to play on the 40th anniversary of Parks' arrest. Armstrong appeared on Broadway in 1991 in a production of Don't Get God Started. "Always," a Marvin Winans composition which is a key song in the play, appeared on Armstrong's 1987 self-titled album. The Broadway role lead to a cameo appearance in the Oprah Winfrey TV special The Women of Brewster Place. Armstrong was chosen to record the theme for the popular 1980s NBC sitcom Amen. Armstrong took a three-year self-imposed hiatus from recording before releasing A Brand New Day under a new deal with Tommy Boy Gospel in 2001. She was presented with a lifetime achievement award during 2004's Gospel Superfest.

Her 2007 album, Walking Miracle, is her first release in 6 years, and blends traditional gospel fare like "So Good To Me" (produced by Smokie Norful) with contemporary songs such as "Til The Victory's Won" (produced by Fred Jerkins III) and the title track (produced by Rodney Jerkins). The latter song was inspired by Armstrong's son who was diagnosed with multiple sclerosis at about the same time of the album's release.

In June 2024, Armstrong released her first studio album in 15 years, titled ‘Today’.

=== Collaborations ===
Armstrong recorded a stand out duet "Choose Ye" with gospel act The Winans on their major label debut Let My People Go for Qwest Records. She also sang the theme song for the 1980s NBC sitcom Amen. She was a frequent musical guest of the early projects of John P. Kee & The New Life Community Choir, and her voice is featured on several songs which include "We Walk By Faith" and "We Glorify".

== Personal life ==
Armstrong has five children.

== Discography ==
=== Albums ===
Peace Be Still

- Released: 1983
- Format: LP/CS
- Label: Onyx/Muscle Shoals Sound

Chosen (ONYXD3825)

- Released: 1984
- Format: LP/CS/CD
- Label: Onyx/Muscle Shoals Sound

Following Jesus

- Released: 1986
- Format: LP/CS
- Label: Muscle Shoals Sound

Vanessa Bell Armstrong

- Released: 1987
- Format: LP/CS/CD
- Label: Jive

Wonderful One

- Released: 1989
- Format: LP/CS/CD
- Label: Jive

The Truth About Christmas

- Released: 1990
- Format: LP/CS/CD
- Label: Jive

Something on the Inside

- Released: 1993
- Format: LP/CS/CD
- Label: Jive

The Secret Is Out

- Released: 1995
- Format: CS/CD
- Label: Verity

Desire of My Heart: Live In Detroit

- Released: 1998
- Format: CS/CD
- Label: Verity

A Brand New Day

- Released: 2001
- Format: CD
- Label: Tommy Boy
- Certification:

Walking Miracle

- Released: 2007
- Format: CD
- Label: EMI Gospel

The Experience

- Released: 2009
- Format: LP/CS/CD
- Label: EMI Gospel

=== Compilations ===
Greatest Hits

- Released: 1990
- Format: CD
- Label: Muscle Shoals Sound Gospel

The Best of Vanessa Bell Armstrong

- Released: 1999
- Format: CD
- Label: Verity

Sing To Glory

- Released: 2005
- Format: CD
- Label: Sony BMG Special Markets

Praise & Worship

- Released: 2006
- Format: CD
- Label: Verity/Legacy

=== Singles ===
"You Bring Out The Best in Me b/w Always" from the album Vanessa Bell Armstrong

- Released: 1987
- Format: 7"
- Label: Jive

"Pressing On b/w Don't Turn Your Back" from the album Vanessa Bell Armstrong

- Format: 7"/12"
- Label: Jive
- Producer: Timmy Allen

"Something Inside So Strong" from the album Wonderful One

- Released: 1988
- Format: 7"/12"/CD
- Label: Jive

"I'm Coming Back" from the album Wonderful One

- Released: 1989
- Format: 12"
- Label: Jive

"Something on the Inside" from the album Something on the Inside

- Released: 1993
- Format: CS/CD
- Label: Jive
- Producer: John P. Kee

"So Good To Me" from the album Walking Miracle

- Released: 2006
- Format: CD/Digital Download
- Label: EMI Gospel
- Producer: Smokie Norful

== Awards and nominations ==
=== Dove Awards ===
The Dove Awards are awarded annually by the Gospel Music Association. Bell Armstrong has received 2 nominations.

Year	Award	Nominated work	Result
1984	Traditional Black Gospel Album	Peace Be Still	Nominated
1985	Traditional Black Gospel Album	Chosen'	Nominated

=== Grammy Awards ===
The Grammy Awards are awarded annually by the National Academy of Recording Arts and Sciences. Bell Armstrong has received 7 nominations.

Year	Award	Nominated work	Result
1984	Best Soul Gospel Performance, Female	Peace Be Still	Nominated
1986	Best Soul Gospel Performance, Female	Chosen	Nominated
1987	Best Soul Gospel Performance By A Duo, Group, Choir Or Chorus	"Chosen Ye" (with The Winans)	Nominated
1989	Best Soul Gospel Performance, Female	"Pressing On"	Nominated
1992	Best Traditional Gospel Album	The Truth About Christmas	Nominated
1994	Best Contemporary Soul Gospel Album	Something On The Inside	Nominated
2011	Best Traditional Gospel Album	The Experience	Nominated

=== Soul Train Awards ===
The Soul Train Music Awards are awarded annually. Bell Armstrong has received 1 award.

Year	Award	Nominated work	Result
1988	Best Gospel Album – Solo	Following Jesus	Won

=== Stellar Awards ===
The Stellar Awards are awarded annually by SAGMA. Bell Armstrong has received 3 awards from 6 nominations.

Year	Award	Nominated work	Result
1989	Contemporary Female Artist of the Year	Vanessa Bell Armstrong	Won
1994	Contemporary Female Artist of the Year	Something On the Outside	Won
2008	Female Vocalist of the Year	Walking Miracle	Nominated
2011	Traditional Female Vocalist of the Year	The Experience	Nominated
2011	Traditional CD of the Year	The Experience	Nominated
2013	Traditional Female Artist of the Year	Timeless	Won

=== Miscellaneous honors ===
Year	Organization	Award	Nominated work	Result
2025	Missouri Gospel Music Hall of Fame		Herself	Inducted
