= Wonderful One (album) =

Studio album by Vanessa Bell Armstrong
- Released: 24 August 1989
- Genre: gospel music, R&B
- Length: 43:59
- Label: Jive/Verity
- Producer: Loris Holland

Vanessa Bell Armstrong chronology
Vanessa Bell Armstrong (1987)	Wonderful One (1989)	The Truth About Christmas (1990)

Wonderful One is the fifth overall album of gospel singer Vanessa Bell Armstrong, and second for major label Jive Records.

Having penetrated the mainstream market with the previous year's singles "You Bring Out The Best In Me" and "Pressing On," the artist continued the trend with the singles "I'm Coming Back" and a cover of the Labi Siffre anti-Apartheid anthem "Something Inside So Strong." Armstrong would later reprise her performance on the song as part of a multi-artist tribute to civil rights activist Rosa Parks.

Professional ratings
Review scores
Source	Rating
Allmusic	link

== Track listing ==
1. Something Inside So Strong (4:51)
2. Tell The World (4:32)
3. True Love Never Fails (duet with Jonathan Butler) (4:49)
4. Wonderful One (4:32)
5. I'm Coming Back (4:45)
6. Count On Your Love (4:44)
7. You Make Me Wanna Love Again (4:47)
8. Without You (4:47)
9. What Shall I Render (5:25)
