= Walking Miracle =

Studio album by Vanessa Bell Armstrong
- Released: 2007
- Genre: Gospel; R&B; urban contemporary gospel
- Label: EMI Gospel
- Producer: Rodney Jerkins; Fred Jerkins III; J. Moss; Smokie Norful

Vanessa Bell Armstrong chronology
A Brand New Day (2001)	Walking Miracle (2007)

Walking Miracle is the eleventh studio album by gospel singer Vanessa Bell Armstrong, release in 2007 on EMI Gospel. The album peaked at No. 14 on the US Billboard Top Gospel Albums chart.

== Critical reception ==
Professional ratings
Review scores
Source	Rating
AllMusic	3.5/5 stars

AllMusic's Andree Farias, in a 3.5/5 star review, remarked "Vanessa Bell Armstrong's Walking Miracle is a comeback in every sense of the term. Walking Miracle is best described as an urban AC disc with strong contemporary R&B elements, not unlike the material the songstress recorded during her much-maligned Jive years, except unabashedly spiritual in content...As it stands, Walking Miracle is just a comeback -- a very good one, at that, but one that still needs a little extra to really push it over the top."

== Track listing ==
1. "Walking Miracle" (3:44)
2. "Seasons" (3:37)
3. "So Good to Me" (4:27)
4. "Wait" (4:54)
5. "Fall in Love Again" (3:57)
6. "Watch Me" (4:30)
7. "Til the Victory's Won" (3:51)
8. "Just Hold On" (4:35)
9. "It's Over Now" (4:06)
10. "I Just Love You" (3:58)
