= Peace Be Still (Vanessa Bell Armstrong album) =

Studio album by Vanessa Bell Armstrong
- Released: 1983
- Recorded: RNJ Studios, Detroit, MI
- Genre: Gospel
- Label: Onyx International/The Benson Company
- Producer: Thomas Whitfield; Walter Hawkins

Vanessa Bell Armstrong chronology
Peace Be Still (1983)	Chosen (1984)

Peace Be Still is the debut studio album from gospel singer Vanessa Bell Armstrong, released in 1983 on Onyx International/The Benson Company. The album peaked at No. 2 on the US Billboard Top Spiritual LPs chart.

== Critical reception ==
Professional ratings
Review scores
Source	Rating
AllMusic	4.5/5 stars

AllMusic's Bill Carpenter, in a 4.5/5 star review, noted "Traditional hymns that are given 'Holiness' treatment."

== Accolades ==
Armstrong received a Grammy nomination in the category of Best Soul Gospel Performance, Female for the album.

== Track listing ==
Side A:

1. Peace Be Still (6:28)
2. Labor In Vain (2:59)
3. I Have Surrendered (3:14)
4. He's Real (5:00)

Side B:

1. He Looked Beyond My Faults
2. Any Way You Bless Me
3. God So Loved The World
4. God, My God
