= Julian Work =

American classical composer

- Born: Julian Cassander Work; September 25, 1910; Nashville, Tennessee
- Died: June 15, 1995 (aged 84); Tolland, Massachusetts
- Education: Fisk University
- Occupations: arranger, composer
- Employer: CBS
- Parent: John Wesley Work Jr. (father)
- Relatives: John Wesley Work (grandfather), John Wesley Work III (brother)

Julian Cassander Work (September 25, 1910—June 15, 1995) was an arranger and composer.

Work was born in Nashville, Tennessee, to a family of professional musicians. His grandfather, John Wesley Work (1848–1923) was a composer and arranger for the Fisk Jubilee Singers; his father, John Wesley Work Jr. (1871–1925) was the first African-American collector of folk songs and spirituals, and also a choral director, educator and songwriter; his brother John Wesley Work III (1901–1967) was a composer, educator, choral director, musicologist and scholar of African-American folklore and music; his mother, Agnes Hayes Work, was a singer who also helped train the Fisk Jubilee Singers.

Work studied music with local teacher Mary E. Chamberlain and was involved in musical activities from an early age, participating in neighborhood musical groups and performing as a jazz pianist. He studied composition with his brother John Wesley Work III while attending Fisk University, where he majored in sociology. By 1929 he had moved to New York City and was playing piano on the radio. He became a staff arranger for CBS Radio, becoming one of the first Black American composers to write music for radio and television. He was also the sole music arranger for the Voice of Firestone on radio and television. Work was also a member of the American Society of Music Arrangers and served on its national board in the mid-1940s.

Work married Kathryn Holliday in 1953. Upon his retirement they moved to Tolland, Massachusetts, where he died.

== Partial list of compositions ==
- Wanderlust (1938)
- Myriorama by Night (orchestra, ca. 1946)
- Portraits from the Bible (1956)
- Autumn Walk (wind band, 1957)
- Processional Hymn (arrangement of "Gaudeamus Igitur" for chorus with band or piano accompaniment, 1957)
- Driftwood Patterns (wind band, 1961)
- Stand the Storm (1963)
- Reflections, Poems of Praise
- Forest Images
