= The Secret Is Out =

Studio album by Vanessa Bell Armstrong
- Released: 1995
- Studio: White Room Studio
- Genre: gospel, R&B
- Length: 1:05:48
- Label: Jive/Verity
- Producer: John P. Kee

Vanessa Bell Armstrong chronology
Something on the Inside (1993)	The Secret Is Out (1995)	Desire of My Heart: Live in Detroit (1998)

The Secret Is Out is the eighth studio album by gospel singer Vanessa Bell Armstrong, released in 1995 on Verity Records. This album peaked at No. 8 on the US Billboard Top Gospel Albums chart.

== Critical reception ==
Professional ratings
Review scores
Source	Rating
AllMusic	3/5 stars

AllMusic's Stephen Thomas Erlewine, in a 3/5 star review, commented "Vanessa Bell Armstrong turns in one of her most straightforward gospel recordings".

== Track listing ==
No.	Title	Writer(s)	Length
1.	"I'm Encouraged"	John P. Kee	3:41
2.	"Good News Blues"	John P. Kee	4:45
3.	"I Really Love You"	John P. Kee	5:43
4.	"Vanessa's Medley: 'What Shall I Render'/'Faith That Conquers'/'Nobody But Jesus'/'For God So Loved The World'/'Peace Be Still'/'The Denied Stone'"	Steve Roberts, Traditional, Marvin Winans, Lanny Wolfe	6:00
5.	"Tear"	John P. Kee	4:25
6.	"Choose Again" (with John P. Kee)	John P. Kee	4:40
7.	"The Secret Is Out"	John P. Kee	3:00
8.	"Love Lifted Me"	John P. Kee	4:35
9.	"I Am Determined"
10.	Untitled	John P. Kee	5:15
11.	"Little Sister"	John P. Kee	4:55
12.	"There Is Nothing"	John P. Kee	4:40
13.	"Ninth Month"	John P. Kee	5:13
14.	"The Secret Is Out" (Interlude)		1:30
15.	"Love Lifted Me" (Remix)	John P. Kee	7:26
