= Frederick J. Work =

American songwriter (1879–1942)

Frederick Jerome Work (c. 1879 - 1942) was a collector, arranger ("harmonizer"), and composer of songs in the United States. He was part of a family of musicians and published a collection of African-American spirituals with his brother John Wesley Work.

He worked at Fisk University and with its Jubilee Singers and toured with another singing group he conducted. He played the piano. He was photographed at Albert Coombs Barnes home in 1940.

He was born in Nashville, Tennessee.

== Books ==
- New Jubilee Songs, as sung by the Fisk Jubilee Singers of Fisk University 2nd ed. Collected and Harmonized by Frederick J. Work (1904)
- Folk songs of the American Negro with John Wesley Work with John Wesley Work II

== Songs ==
- "Wade in the Water"
- "Out of the Depths"

== See also ==
- Julian Work
- Monroe Work
