= Negro Universities Press =

U.S. specialty/academic publisher, est. 1968

Negro Universities Press (NUP) was an American publishing house that "published many reprints and original works related to the Black experience." Per the company's 1969 catalog, NUP was an incorporated company that was designed to behave as a university press for the historically black colleges and universities of the United States, and "to publish original books written by scholars and specialists affiliated with the more than one hundred American colleges and universities that are predominantly Negro in enrollment. Negro Universities Press also publishes a wide range of facsimile reprints of highly significant books and periodicals related to Negro history and culture."

The company was organized in 1968 and initially headquartered on 43rd Street in New York City. In 1959, Marguerite Cartwright mentioned in her newspaper column that she had met with Alan Angoff about his proposal for a Negro Universities Press. Angoff wrote about the lack of a Negro university press.

Circa 1970, the Press had a partnership with New American Library. NUP was a division or affiliate of Greenwood Press.

Among the company's publications was a 125-volume history of slavery in the U.S., composed primarily of 1000-copy reprints of books from the late 19th century to the 1930s. They also reprinted whole runs of historical African-American periodicals, including the National Anti-Slavery Standard (1840–1870), Colored American magazine (1900–1909), and the NAACP's The Crisis. The Reprints of Negro Periodicals series was "the first complete facsimile reproduction of any of these periodicals. Many of the titles are unavailable in complete form in any one library and have been completed only by drawing upon the holdings of several libraries. In some cases the only existing copy in the world has been used for reproduction purposes. These periodicals present a broad history of Black culture and thought during the nineteenth and early twentieth centuries."

== See also ==
- HBCU Library Alliance
- Monroe Work
