= A Brand New Day (album) =

Studio album by Vanessa Bell Armstrong
- Released: 2001
- Genre: gospel, R&B
- Length: 54:19
- Label: Tommy Boy Gospel
- Producer: Deitrick Haddon, Gerald Haddon

Vanessa Bell Armstrong chronology
Desire Of My Heart: Live In Detroit (1998)	A Brand New Day (2001)	Walking Miracle (2007)

Professional ratings
Review scores
Source	Rating
AllMusic	3/5 stars

A Brand New Day is the tenth overall album of gospel singer Vanessa Bell Armstrong, and first for Tommy Boy Gospel, a then-recently started imprint of the Tommy Boy Records label. Though relegated to traditional gospel production on her last two releases for Jive/Verity, New Day sees Armstrong return to the urban contemporary R&B sound that marked her mainstream gospel hits such as "You Bring Out The Best In Me" and "Pressing On."

"Jesus I'll Never Forget" was released to radio as the initial single from the set. The album also provided an opportunity for Armstrong to duet with her daughter Melody on "No Failure." Melody Armstrong previously made a recorded appearance on "Anybody Here" from Deitrick Haddon's Supernatural album with resident choir Voices Of Unity.

== Critical reception ==
AllMusic's Tim A. Smith, in a 3/5 star review, exclaimed "Contemporary gospel music veteran Vanessa Bell Armstrong sports a new musical attitude on her debut project for the Tommy Boy Gospel label, entitled A Brand New Day....The Haddon brothers give Armstrong a vibrant, more youthful feel through their production, which can be readily noticed through the rock-flavored, guitar-dominated, Tina Turner-sounding track "He's Real" and the hip-hop-juiced "Make a Way...Overall, this recording ushers in a brand new day for a reborn Vanessa Bell Armstrong."

== Track listing ==
1. "Jesus I'll Never Forget" (3:54)
2. "New Day" (2:45)
3. "Make a Way" (4:00)
4. "Do What He Said" (5:17)
5. "You've Been Good" (3:59)
6. "Somebody Prayed" (feat. Deitrick Haddon) (4:53)
7. "Somebody Prayed (Remix)" (2:21)
8. "He's Real" (4:11)
9. "Holding On" (4:23)
10. "No Failure" (Interlude) (1:11)
11. "No Failure" (4:25)
12. "Promise" (4:34)
13. "Shall Not Be Moved" (4:33)
14. "Say Goodbye" (3:53)
