= Chosen (album) =

Studio album by Vanessa Bell Armstrong
- Released: 1984
- Genre: Gospel music
- Length: 39:16
- Label: Muscle Shoals Sound Records

Vanessa Bell Armstrong chronology
Peace Be Still (1983)	Chosen (1984)	Following Jesus (1986)

Chosen is the second album by gospel singer Vanessa Bell Armstrong. This album hit number one on the US Billboard Top Gospel Albums chart. The track "Nobody But Jesus" became a signature hit for the artist.

== Critical reception ==
AllMusic gave Chosen a 3/5 star rating.

== Accolades ==
Chosen received a Grammy nomination in the category of Best Soul Gospel Performance, Female.

== Track listing ==
1. What He's Done For Me (4:01)
2. Nobody But Jesus (6:58)
3. There's A Brighter Day (3:31)
4. Teach Me Oh Lord (5:06)
5. Walk With Me (5:22)
6. Waitin' (featuring Earl Buffington) (4:42)
7. I Feel Jesus (4:05)
8. Faith That Conquers (3:40)
9. Nobody But Jesus (Reprise) (1:04)
10. He's So Real (0:47)
