= Lewis Wade Jones =

Lewis Wade Jones (March 13, 1910 – September 1979) was a sociologist and teacher.

He was born in Cuero, Texas, the son of Wade E. and Lucynthia McDade Jones. A member of the Omega Psi Phi fraternity, he received his AB degree from Fisk University in 1931, and followed it with postgraduate study as a Social Science Research Council Fellow at the University of Chicago in 1931–1932.

Jones returned to Fisk, where he continued to work closely with Charles S. Johnson, as a research assistant, supervisor of field studies, and instructor in the Department of Social Sciences from 1932 to 1942. In 1949 the two co-wrote A Statistical Analysis of Southern Counties; Shifts in the Negro Population of Alabama.

Jones was a Julius Rosenwald Foundation Fund Fellow at Columbia University, where he was awarded an MA degree in 1939 with the thesis "Occupational Stratification Among Rural and Small Town Negroes before the Civil War and Today." He earned his PhD in 1955.

Before the recording project at Fort Valley, where he was a member of the summer faculty, Jones, along with Johnson and John Wesley Work III collaborated with the Archive of American Folk Song on the Library of Congress/Fisk University Mississippi Delta Collection (AFC 1941/002). This project was a two-year joint field study conducted by the Library of Congress and Fisk University during the summers of 1941 and 1942. The goal of the partnership was to carry out an intensive field study documenting the folk culture of a specific community of African Americans in the Mississippi Delta region. The rapidly urbanizing commercial area of Coahoma County, Mississippi, with its county seat in Clarksdale, became the geographical focus of the study.

Almost immediately following Jones's March 1943 recordings at Fort Valley, he served for three years in the United States Army, and became a reports analyst for the domestic branch of the Bureau of Special Services, Office of War Information. He was associate editor of the Negro Yearbook in 1952 and contributed articles to journals.

Jones spent much of the remainder of his career at Tuskegee Institute School of Education, as assistant professor of sociology, director of research for the Rural Life Council, research coordinator, and professor. He was a consultant to a variety of organizations, including the Opportunities Industrialization Centers, the Bureau of Social Science Research, and the U.S. Department of Labor.

On August 13, 1966, he married Queen E. Shootes, a home economist.

At the time of his death, Lewis Jones was a professor of sociology and director of the Tuskegee Institute Rural Development Center.
