= Following Jesus =

Studio album by Vanessa Bell Armstrong
- Released: 1987
- Recorded: Different Fur (Oakland, CA); RMJ Studios (Detroit, MI)
- Genre: Gospel
- Label: Muscle Shoals Sound/Malaco Records
- Producer: Thomas Whitfield, Walter Hawkins

Vanessa Bell Armstrong chronology
Chosen (1984)	Following Jesus (1987)	Vanessa Bell Armstrong (1987)

Following Jesus is the third solo album from Detroit-native gospel singer Vanessa Bell Armstrong, released in 1987 on Muscle Shoals Sound/Malaco Records. The album peaked at No. 5 on the US Billboard Top Gospel Albums chart. Following Jesus won a Soul Train Music Award in the category of Best Solo Gospel Album.

== Track listing ==
=== Side A ===
No.	Title	Writer(s)	Length
1.	"Real Soon"	Walter Hawkins	3:57
2.	"I'm Going Through"	Rudolph Stanfield	4:24
3.	"Following Jesus"	Howard McCrary, Walter Hawkins	3:54
4.	"He's Real"	Charles Nicks	6:38

=== Side B ===
No.	Title	Writer(s)	Length
1.	"Searching"	Walter Hawkins	3:32
2.	"He's My Everything"	Rudolph Stanfield	4:46
3.	"There's A Brighter Day"	Derrick Lee, Thomas A. Whitfield	3:31
4.	"God My God"	Howard McCrary	5:57
