= Vanessa Bell Armstrong (album) =

Studio album by Vanessa Bell Armstrong
- Released: 1987
- Genre: gospel music, R&B
- Length: 37:05
- Label: Jive/Verity
- Producer: Timmy Allen, Loris Holland, Marvin Winans

Vanessa Bell Armstrong chronology
Following Jesus (1986)	Vanessa Bell Armstrong (1987)	Wonderful One (1988)

Professional ratings
Review scores
Source	Rating
Allmusic	link

Vanessa Bell Armstrong is the 4th overall album and 1st major-label album of gospel singer Vanessa Bell Armstrong. Though the artist had garnered Grammy- and Stellar-award nominations previously for her work as an independent artist, this album was the gospel artist's first foray into the mainstream market. The album was produced by Loris Holland as well as Marvin Winans of The Winans.

The album yielded a pair of singles, "Pressing On" and "You Bring Out The Best In Me." The former was also remixed and released in both 7" and 12" formats conducive to crossover into the dance-music market. This was notable as the crossover potential of gospel music was still not widely accepted.

== Track listing ==
1. Pressing On (4:50)
2. You Bring Out The Best In Me (4:24)
3. Learn To Love (4:19)
4. The Denied Stone (5:38)
5. I Wanna Be Ready (4:35)
6. Always (4:15)
7. Living For You (4:25)
8. Don't Turn Your Back (4:39)
