= Go Tell It on the Mountain (song) =

African-American spiritual song

- by unknown
- Genre: Christmas, spiritual
- Related: "Tell It on the Mountain" by Peter, Paul and Mary (1963)
- Published: 1909

A recording of an arrangement of "Go Tell It on the Mountain" for congregational singing (2008)

"Go Tell It on the Mountain" is an African-American spiritual song and Christmas carol which was most likely derived from the oral tradition, but was first printed in an early-1900s compilation of African-American folk songs. It has been sung and recorded by many gospel and secular performers.

== Lyrics ==
The song is considered a Christmas carol, as its original lyrics celebrate the Nativity of Jesus:

Go tell it on the mountain, over the hills and everywhere;
go tell it on the mountain, that Jesus Christ is born.

An alternative final line omits the reference to the birth of Christ, instead declaring that "Jesus Christ is Lord".

Due to the oral tradition of the song, "Go Tell It on the Mountain" has also been used as an Easter song, with the refrain taking the variant of:

Go, tell it on the mountain,

Over the hills and everywhere; Go, tell it on the mountain

That Jesus lives again

—

== Publication history ==
The earliest known publication of the song is attributed to John Wesley Work, Jr. (1871-1925). Work grew up in Nashville where he garnered a love for music from his father who was a choir director. He earned his Master’s in Latin and went on to teach Latin and ancient Greek. However, his first love continued to be music, and he became the first African-American collector of Negro spirituals. Most African-American spirituals originated in oral tradition, but Work, through his extensive research, was able to compile many songs into the New Jubilee Songs as Sung by the Fisk Jubilee Singers. While many books and websites attribute the New Jubilee Songs to John Wesley Work, Jr. in 1901, some sources argue the origins lie with Frederick Jerome Work in 1902. The earliest printed version of "Go Tell" appeared in Thomas P. Fenner's Religious Songs of the Negro as Sung on the Plantations (new edition, 1909).

== Biblical references ==
"Go Tell It on the Mountain" references the Annunciation to the Shepherds described in the Gospel of Luke, hence the alternate title of "While shepherds kept their watching". The Nativity is also referenced in the final verse of the song:

Down in a lowly manger,

the humble Christ was born, and God sent us salvation, that blessed Christmas morn.

Verses: Luke 2:8-20 and Matthew 28:19

— https://hymnary.org/text/while_shepherds_kept_their_watching/compare

== Recording artists ==
In 1963, the musical team Peter, Paul and Mary, along with their musical director Milt Okun, adapted and rewrote "Go Tell It on the Mountain" as "Tell It on the Mountain", their lyrics referring specifically to Exodus and using the phrase "Let my people go", but referring implicitly to the civil rights struggle of the early 1960s which is when it was recorded. This version became a moderately successful single for them (US No. 33 pop, 1964). Cash Box described it as "a rhythmic, updating of the folk oldie with a plaintive message-song motif".

According to religious studies professor and civil rights historian Charles Marsh, it was African-American civil rights leader Fannie Lou Hamer who combined this song with the spiritual "Go Down Moses", taking the last line of the chorus, "let my people go" and substituting it in the chorus of "Go Tell It on the Mountain". Marsh does not document this claim, but notes that Hamer was highly active in civil rights work beginning in the 1950s, and that the use of the Exodus story and the singing of spirituals played a central role in her activities.

In 1964, Simon & Garfunkel released their first studio album, Wednesday Morning, 3 A.M., which contains an arrangement by the duo. In 1964 also, the French singer Marie Laforêt released her French version, Viens sur la montagne, whose lyrics are largely secularized.

The song was a favorite of Jamaican musician, Peter Tosh, who had sung it in church in his youth. According to Bunny Wailer, he and Bob Marley, they first encountered Tosh in 1962 when he was singing this song in the street. Impressed with his voice, they asked him to join their harmony group, which would later be known as Bob Marley & The Wailers. In 1970, The Wailers recorded the song with Tosh on vocals, which was released on The Best Of The Wailers album the following year.

Little Big Town's 2006 non-album single version reached No. 35 on the Hot Country Songs chart.

Popular African-American Contemporary Christian music band Maverick City Music recorded and published their own version of “Go Tell it On the Mountain” in 2021.

American lo-fi and rap/hip-hop musician Forrest Frank released a lo-fi edition of the song, and it was later included on his 2023 studio album New Hymns.

== See also ==
- List of Christmas carols
