= Monroe Work =

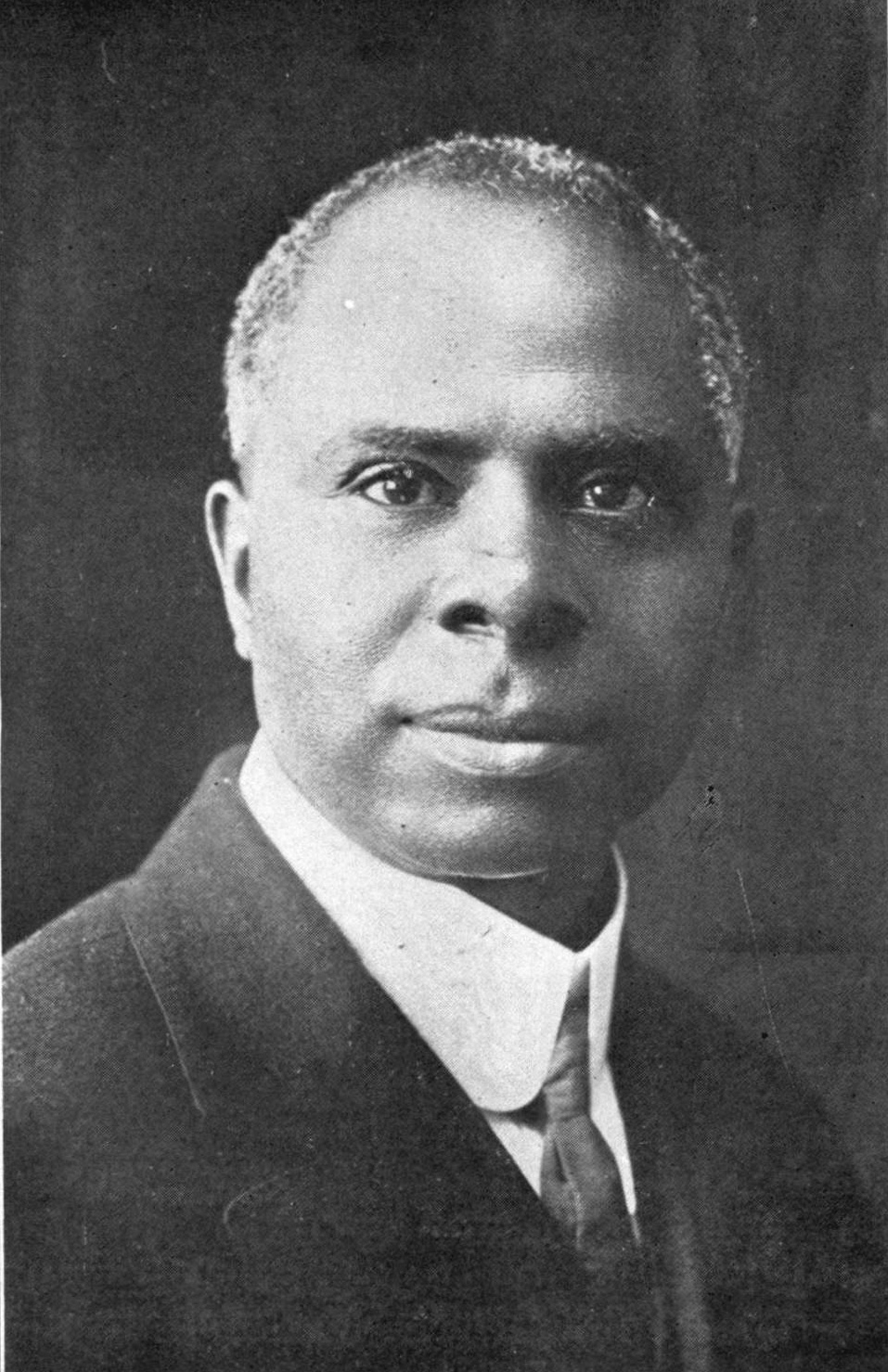
- Born: Monroe Nathan Work; August 15, 1866; Iredell County, North Carolina, U.S.
- Died: May 2, 1945 (aged 78); Tuskegee, Alabama, U.S.
- Education: University of Chicago (B.A. and M.A.)
- Occupation: Sociologist
- Known for: Department of Records and Research at the Tuskegee Institute
- Notable work: Negro Year Book; A Bibliography of the Negro in Africa and America
- Spouse: Florence E. Hendrickson
- Awards: Harmon Award in Education (1928)

Monroe Nathan Work (August 15, 1866 – May 2, 1945) was an African-American sociologist who founded the Department of Records and Research at the Tuskegee Institute in 1908. His published works include the Negro Year Book and A Bibliography of the Negro in Africa and America, a bibliography of approximately seventeen thousand references to African Americans.

He helped expand Tuskegee Institute's national reputation. worked to advance anti-lynching campaigns, and promoted the National Negro Health Week movement. His Negro Year Books and A Bibliography of the Negro in Africa and America—a bibliography of 17,000 references on African Americans, were the largest of their kind in an era when scholarship by and about black Americans was highly inaccessible, and overlooked or ignored by most academics in the US. Jim Crow laws were increasing and there was periodic violence against African Americans at the time.

== Life ==
Work was born to formerly enslaved parents in Iredell County, North Carolina, and moved in 1867 to Cairo, Illinois, where his father pursued farming. At the age of 23, Work entered Arkansas City High School (Kansas), an integrated high school in Arkansas City, Kansas. He graduated 3rd in his class, and after undergoing training at the Chicago Theological Seminary, he enrolled in the University of Chicago to become a sociologist. He did research on the correlation between the highest crime rates among blacks and the large proportion living in slums. His paper on the subject would become the first article published in the American Journal of Sociology by an African American. He finished school in Chicago with a Bachelor of Arts degree in Philosophy and a Master of Arts degree in Sociology.

After graduating in 1903, Work moved to Savannah, Georgia, to become a professor at Georgia State Industrial College. He married Florence E. Hendrickson of Savannah on December 27, 1904. In July 1905, Work attended the conference of the Niagara Movement at the invitation of W. E. B. Du Bois.

In 1908, he accepted a proposal by Booker T. Washington to found the Department of Records and Research at the Tuskegee Institute. While there, he would begin the Negro Year Book, a publication that incorporated his periodic summation of lynching reports, which resulted in the Tuskegee Institute becoming one of the most quoted and undisputed sources on this form of racial violence. According to Work's biographer, these resources were the largest of their kind in an era when scholarship by and about black Americans was highly inaccessible, and overlooked or ignored by most academics in the US.

Work received the Harmon Award in Education in 1928 for his research and involvement in the Negro Year Book and his work on A Bibliography of the Negro in Africa and America.

In 1918, he was elected to the American Negro Academy, which was the earliest major African-American learned society. It brought together scholars, activists, and editors to refute racist scholarship, promote black claims to individual, social, and political equality, and publish the history and sociology of African American life.

Work and his wife had no children. He died of natural causes in Tuskegee in 1945.

== Negro Yearbook ==
The Negro Yearbook is an annual encyclopedia of African American history published at the Tuskegee Institute. Work served as its editor for many years. Lewis Wade Jones was an associate editor. publication that compiled facts, sociological data, and directories of distinguished people surrounding the current state of black progress in the US since emancipation. The Negro Year Book also for a time incorporated his periodic summation of lynching reports, which were so thoroughly compiled that the Tuskegee Institute became one of the most quoted and undisputed sources on this form of racial violence.

== Selected works ==
- Work, Monroe Nathan (September 1900). "Crime Among the Negroes in Chicago". American Journal of Sociology. VI: 204–223. doi:10.1086/210962.
- Work, Monroe Nathan, ed. (1912). "Negro Year Book; An Annual Encyclopedia of the Negro". Negro Year Book. Nashville, TN: Sunday School Union: 2 v.
  - Annual editions: Second: 1913; Third: 1914–1915; Fourth: 1916–1917; Fifth: 1918–1919; Sixth: 1921–1922; Seventh: 1925–1926; Eighth: 1931–1932; Ninth: 1937–1938
- Work, Monroe Nathan. Fifty Years Progress: Negro Business, 1867–1917. [Tuskegee, Ala.] : Tuskegee Institute, [1918?]
- Work, Monroe Nathan, ed. (1998) [1928]. A Bibliography of the Negro in Africa and America. New York: Martino. ISBN 978-1578980314.

== See also ==
- Negro Universities Press
