= Rickey Grundy =

- Also known as: Ricky R. Grundy (birthname)
- Born: January 30, 1959; Los Angeles, California, United States
- Died: July 27, 2015 (aged 56) Los Angeles, California, United States
- Genres: Gospel, traditional Black gospel, urban contemporary gospel
- Occupations: Singer, songwriter
- Instruments: Vocals, singer-songwriter
- Years active: 1988–2015
- Label: Sparrow
- Formerly of: The Rickey Grundy Chorale

Ricky R. Grundy (January 30, 1959 – July 27, 2015), who went by the stage name Rickey Grundy, was an American gospel musician and leader of The Rickey Grundy Chorale. He started his music career in 1988, with Sparrow Records releasing Spirit Come Down, and they released two albums that placed on the Billboard magazine Gospel Albums chart. Grundy died on July 27, 2015, after a season of health complications.

== Early life ==
Grundy was born in Los Angeles, California, United States graduated from high school at fifteen, and went on to the University of Southern California to study at their conservatory of music.

== Music career ==
His music recording career started in 1979 when he wrote "Call Him Up" for Keith Pringle and the Pentecostal Community Choir. He served as a pianist and wrote several songs for Pringle and was the lead vocalist on Pringle's 1988 song "I'm So Grateful."

Grundy struck out on his own in 1988 with the release of Spirit Come Down by Sparrow Records, and this charted on the Billboard magazine Gospel Albums chart at No. 22. The subsequent album, The Rickey Grundy Chorale, was released in 1990, and placed at No. 10 on the aforementioned chart. Grundy portrayed the choir leader in the 2004 motion picture The Ladykillers by the Coen brothers.

== Discography ==
List of studio albums, with selected chart positions
Title	Album details	Peak chart positions
Title	Album details	US Gos
Spirit Come Down	Released: 1988; Label: Sparrow; CD, digital download	22
The Rickey Grundy Chorale	Released: 1990; Label: Sparrow; CD, digital download	10
