= Thomas Whitfield (singer) =

- Born: Thomas Anthony Whitfield; April 30, 1954; Detroit, Michigan
- Origin: Detroit, Michigan, U.S.
- Died: June 20, 1992 (aged 38) Southfield, Michigan
- Genre: Gospel
- Instruments: Vocals, piano, organ, keyboards
- Years active: 1971–1992
- Labels: Sound Of Gospel; Onyx; Benson
- Formerly of: Thomas Whitfield Company

Thomas Anthony Whitfield (April 30, 1954 – June 20, 1992) was an American gospel singer, songwriter, arranger, pianist, choir director and producer. He was best known for helping to shape the fabric of contemporary gospel music with his elaborate choral arrangements and the merging of musical styles, ranging from jazz to classical, into traditional black gospel foundations.This style earned him the title of "Maestro" from many of his colleagues and supporters.

Whitfield was best known for organizing one of the popular contemporary gospel choirs of all time, the Thomas Whitfield Company, and for producing best-selling records for Vanessa Bell Armstrong, Shirley Caesar, Yolanda Adams, Douglas Miller, Keith Pringle, Paul Morton and Aretha Franklin.

== Biography ==
=== Early years and career ===
Thomas Whitfield, the eldest of five boys, was born in Detroit, Michigan, to Thomas and Jacqueline Whitfield. He took to music at a very early age and was inspired by his great-grandmother to take piano lessons at the age of five and would advance to playing the organ by the age of ten. His influences remained some of Detroit's greatest musicians including renowned organist Herbert Pickard and Timothy Beard. After graduating from Detroit's Central High School, he attended the Detroit Conservatory of Music and ended up sharing his expertise and knowledge as a music instructor at Finney High School.

In 1977, along with his good friend Tyrone Hemphill, Whitfield established The Thomas Whitfield Company, a local music ministry featuring some of Detroit's singers and musicians. This institution remained the apparent incubator for most of Whitfield's most popular creations and would forever be attached to his musical legacy and recording career.

Sound of Gospel, a local Detroit gospel music subsidiary of Westbound Records operated by music guru Armen Boladian, took notice in Whitfield's fresh sound and approach to gospel music and signed him and the group thereafter; resulting in the debut release of "Brand New" in 1978.

=== The big break: Hallelujah Anyhow ===
After getting local attention with the releases of "Brand New" and "Things That We Believe, Vol. I" and "Things That We Believe, Vol. II" during the years of 1978–1980, Whitfield recorded his first live recording session (a popular trend in modern gospel music) with the Company at the St. Paul Church of God In Christ in Detroit. The album was finally released in 1983. At the same time, Whitfield began his association with Onyx International Records (a black gospel subsidiary of Benson Records) and also released "Hold Me"; a solo project that seemed to be threatening towards SOG's current contract with the Whitfield Company. While "Hold Me" was released on a more recognized label and was by far one of Whitfield's state-of-the-art productions to date, it also help increased the popularity and exposure of "Hallelujah Anyhow" and kept the album on Billboard's Gospel Music charts for over a year.

The understanding of the agreement with both music labels was that Whitfield recorded "Hold Me" as a solo entry while SOG was mainly interested in Whitfield being attached to the choir; feeling that his choir was the "selling card". SOG continued to record them as: Min. Thomas Whitfield & the Thomas Whitfield Company. Whitfield wrote most of the songs (except for "Soon As I Get Home" and "There's Not A Friend" – written by Roscoe Corner) and produced both projects. Songs like "God Wants Our Praises", "There's Not A Friend", "Walk In The Light", the infectious arrangement of "Oh, How I Love Jesus" and the brilliant ballad "Hallelujah Anyhow" were standouts.

Whitfield began a line of notable achievements in producing for both established and fresh talent. In 1984, Whitfield produced the historic debut project Peace Be Still, for a virtual unknown singer at the time by the name of Vanessa Bell Armstrong; earning him his first of three GRAMMY nominations. That year, he also wrote "Time To Come Back Home" for Shirley Caesar's GRAMMY and Dove Award winning "Sailin" album. Whitfield's popularity and demand continued to escalate – possibly pointing that he may have reached the beginning of his recording zenith. Production on projects from the Soul Children of New Orleans, Keith Pringle, Douglas Miller, the Winans, the Michael Fletcher Chorale and Paul S. Morton followed. In 1986, "I'm Encouraged" was released; a live recording session held at the Civic Auditorium in Cleveland, Ohio. The project climbed to the #1 spot on Billboard's Top Gospel Album charts.

During Whitfield's final years with Sound of Gospel, Whitfield discovered Texas native Yolanda Adams and produced her first project Just As I Am for the Detroit label in 1988 which skyrocketed up Billboard's Gospel charts.

An opportunity of a lifetime was awarded to Whitfield when the Queen of Soul Aretha Franklin confronted him with the task to head the musical direction for her upcoming live recording – a project that the media labeled the sequel to her best-selling and award-winning "Amazing Grace" LP. In 1989, Aretha Franklin took home a GRAMMY Award for Best Soul Gospel Performance, Female for "One Lord, One Faith, One Baptism" and a Dove Award for Traditional Gospel Album of the Year – an album that featured musical and choral arrangements from Thomas A. Whitfield. Some of the album's serious highlights include the moving opener of "Walk In The Light" and Aretha Franklin being serenaded by Whitfield's entrancing piano accompaniment on "Ave Maria".

=== Later years ===
In 1989, Teresa Hairston (head of Benson Music Group's black gospel department) contacted Whitfield and expressed interest in signing him, along with the Whitfield Company to her label. SOG released two successful projects ("The Annual Christmas Services", "...And They Sang A Hymn") in 1990, while Whitfield went into the studio to record "My Faith" for Benson. The project contained the Edwin Hawkins' composition "Glorify The Lord" and featured musical appearances from Vanessa Bell Armstrong and Karen Clark-Sheard (from the renowned Clark Sisters).

In 1992, Benson released what would be Whitfield's last recording, "Alive And Satisfied". The album, to so many gospel music historians, felt like a prophecy and a "love letter" to Whitfield's presence in the gospel music industry. The album featured the moving praise-and-worship ballad "Precious Jesus", "Let Everything Praise Him" (which features the popular sampled vamp used in a number of recent gospel selections) and the reflective "We Remember (Medley)". The medley featured some of Whitfield's most treasured classics strung together in one song. By this time, Whitfield had already been contacted by Paramount Pictures to appear in the motion picture Leap of Faith, starring Steve Martin. He eventually turned down the offer and began work with music mogul Quincy Jones' "Handel's Messiah: A Soulful Celebration".

=== Death ===
On June 20, 1992, after a lengthy choir rehearsal, Whitfield went with four of the choir members to Elias Brother's Big Boy; a popular local restaurant on Telegraph Road. At the table, he started to clutch his chest and began to gasp for air. After being administered CPR by his dinner companions and arriving at Garden City Hospital, Whitfield died on June 20, 1992, from a heart attack.

=== Legacy ===
Whitfield's work has had a lasting influence on a number of prominent contemporary gospel artists, including protégé Rudolph Stanfield, Donald Lawrence, Fred Hammond, John P. Kee, Byron Cage, Ricky Dillard, J.J. Hairston & Youthful Praise, Walter Hawkins, Richard Smallwood, Big Jim Wright, Edward Dawson and others. He is recognized for his innovations during the 1980s and early 1990s, particularly his early adoption of MIDI sequencing and synthesizers in gospel music, which contributed to the development of a distinctive style that became associated with his name.

In 1993, Benson Records released a tribute album dedicated to the memory of Thomas Whitfield. It featured new arrangements from Whitfield hits and featured a list of musical guests and musicians including Donald Lawrence, the Clark Sisters, Fred Hammond, Kevin Bond, Larry & David Whitfield and the Whitfield Company.

Thomas Whitfield was honored posthumously with the 1999 James Cleveland Award at the 14th Annual Stellar Music Awards held in Atlanta, Georgia.

The Thomas Whitfield Company has continued to perform and record since their founder passed and are ensuring to keep Whitfield's legacy alive. They have recorded "Still", a Top Ten gospel album, and featured new and rare selections from Whitfield, along with music from former Whitfield musician Rudolph Stanfield. The song, "Don't Give Up On Jesus", sung by Daryl Coley and Vanessa Bell Armstrong also appeared on the best-selling WOW Gospel 1999 compilation.

Larry and David Whitfield, brothers of the "Maestro", decided to organize the Whitfield Group (not to be confused with the Whitfield Company) in January 1994. Since their inception, the music troupe has recorded one project and have opened for artists including Yolanda Adams, Vanessa Bell Armstrong, Men of Standard and Kim Burrell.

There have been a number of artists that have sung Whitfield's praises and have re-recorded his music. Some of the most memorable tributes include:

- Shirley Murdock "We Need A Word From The Lord" ("Home")
- Vickie Winans "We Need A Word From The Lord" ("Bringing It All Together")
- Edwin Hawkins Music and Arts Seminar Mass Choir "Precious Jesus" ("Dallas")
- Bishop Paul S. Morton "Down At The Cross" and "Nothing But The Blood"("Still Standing")
- Tarralyn Ramsey "Saved" ("Tarralyn Ramsey")
- Donald Lawrence/Tri-City Singers "The Little Drummer Boy" ("Hello Christmas")
- Byron Cage "Still Say Yes" ("Prince Of Praise")
- Byron Cage "In Case You've Forgotten" ("An Invitation To Worship")
- The Clark Sisters "You Can't Take My Faith Away" ("A Tribute To The Maestro")
- Earnest Pugh "Wrapped Up, Tied Up, Tangled Up" ("A Worshipper's Perspective")
- Donald Vails featuring Yvette Flunder and Shirley Miller "Just Knowing Jesus" ("My Soul Love Jesus")
- Rodney Posey "Dear Jesus" ("Live In Praise & Worship with the Whitfield Company")
- Mark S. Hubbard & the Voices "Lift Those Hands And Bless Him" (featuring Ted & Sheri) ("Blessin' Waitin' On Me)
- Dr. Ed Montgomery/ALC "With My Whole Heart" (Total Live Experience")

Benson Records released a rare VHS "Alive And Satisfied" video of Thomas Whitfield and the Whitfield Company. The video also features an award presentation to Whitfield for his record going gold and also an emotional tribute from Fred Hammond. BMG Heritage Records has also re-released a double-CD of Aretha Franklin's "One Lord, One Faith, One Baptism" (1987) in 2003. The album featured four new bonus cuts including a previously unreleased version of Walter Hawkins' classic "Be Grateful".

== Discography ==
Albums:

- Brand New (1978)
- Things That We Believe, Vol. I (1979)
- Things That We Believe, Vol. II (1980)
- Hold Me (1983)
- Halleujah Anyhow (1984) #15
- I'm Encouraged (1986) #1
- The Annual Christmas Services (1988)
- ...And They Sang A Hymn (1989) #2
- My Faith (1990) #30
- Alive And Satisfied (1992) #2
- Hold On (2000) #8

Compilations:

- The Unforgettable Years, Vol. One (1992)
- The Unforgettable Years, Vol. Two (1992)
- The Best Of Thomas Whitfield (1999)
