= John Wesley Work Jr. =

American musicologist (1871–1925)

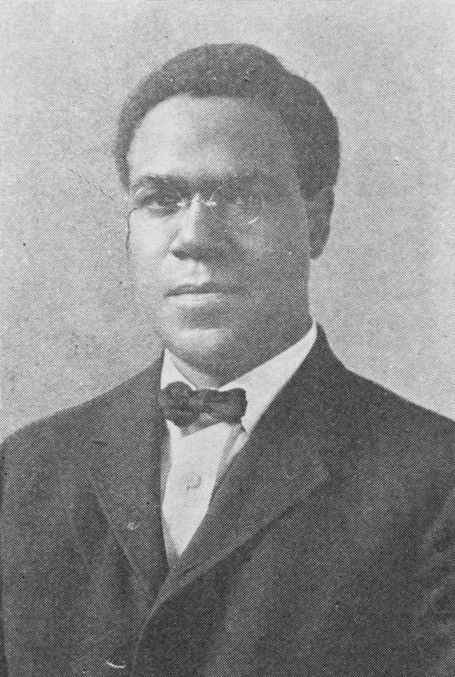
- Born: August 6, 1871; Nashville, Tennessee, U.S.
- Died: September 7, 1925 (aged 54); Nashville, Tennessee, U.S.
- Education: Fisk University; Harvard University
- Occupations: Musicologist; folklorist; choral director; singer; songwriter; publisher; educator
- Known for: Collector of Folk songs and spirituals, published in New Jubilee Folk Songs as Sung by The Fisk Jubilee Singers (1901), New Jubilee Songs and Folk Song of the American Negros (1907)
- Spouse: Agnes Haynes Work
- Children: 6, including John III
- Relatives: Frederick Jerome Work (brother)

John Wesley Work Jr. (August 6, 1871 – September 7, 1925) was an American musicologist choral director, educationalist singer and songwriter. He was the first African American collector of folk songs and spirituals.

== Early life and education ==
Work was born on August 6, 1871, in Nashville, Tennessee, to Samuella and John Wesley Work Sr., who was director of a church choir, some of whose members were also in the original Fisk Jubilee Singers. Work attended Fisk University, where he organized singing groups and studied Latin and history, graduating in 1895. He also studied at Harvard University.

== Career ==
Work taught in Tullahoma, Tennessee and worked in the library at Fisk University, before taking an appointment as a Latin and history instructor at Fisk in 1904. His colleague, instructor and registrar Minnie Lou Crosthwaite, later commented on his deep interest in the "progress and welfare of his students", though he had conflicts with others in the Fisk music department.

With his wife and his brother, Frederick Jerome Work, Work began collecting slave songs and spirituals, publishing them as New Jubilee Songs as Sung by the Fisk Jubilee Singers (1901) and New Jubilee Songs and Folk Songs of the American Negro (1907). The latter book included the first publication of "Go Tell It on the Mountain", which he may have had a hand in composing. His other songs included "Song of the Warrior", "If Only You Were Here", "Negro Lullaby", and "Negro Love Song". He also established the music publishing company, Work Brothers and Hart.

As the director of the Fisk Jubilee Singers, he was responsible for taking them on tour each year. Because of negative feelings toward black folk music at Fisk, he was forced to resign his post there in 1923. He then served as president of Roger Williams University in Nashville, until his death in 1925.

== Personal life and death ==
Work married Agnes Haynes in 1899. They had six children, with John III going on to become a composer.

Work died on September 7, 1925, aged 54, in Nashville.
