= Work song =

Piece of music closely connected to a form of work

A work song is a piece of music closely connected to a form of physical labor, either one sung while conducting a task (usually to coordinate timing) or one linked to a task that may be a connected narrative, description, or protest song. An example is "I've Been Working on the Railroad".

== Definitions and categories ==
Records of work songs are as old as historical records, and anthropological evidence suggests that most agrarian societies tend to have them.

When defining work songs, most modern commentators include songs that are sung while working, as well as songs that are about work or have work as the main subject, since the two categories are often interconnected. Norm Cohen divided collected work songs into the following categories: domestic, agricultural or pastoral, sea shanties, African-American work songs, songs and chants of direction, and street cries. Ted Gioia built on these categories by dividing agricultural and pastoral songs into subsections: hunting, cultivation and herding songs. Gioia also highlighted the industrial or proto-industrial songs of cloth workers (see Waulking song), factory workers, seamen, longshoremen, mechanics, plumbers, electricians, lumberjacks, cowboys and miners. He also added prisoner songs and modern work songs.

=== Hunting and pastoral songs ===
In societies without mechanical timekeeping, songs for mobilisation–calling members of a community together for a collective task–were extremely important. Both hunting and the keeping of livestock tended to involve small groups or individuals, usually boys and young men, who would spend long hours working, away from the centers of settlement. As a result, these activities tended to produce long narrative songs, often sung individually, which might dwell on the themes of pastoral activity or animals, designed to pass the time in the tedium of work.

Hunting songs, such as those of the Mbuti of the Congo, often incorporated distinctive whistles and yodels so that hunters could identify each other's locations and the locations of their prey. The melodic patterns and call-and-response structures also provided emotional comfort, cultural meaning, and a sense of unity in distant areas.

=== Agricultural work songs ===
Most agricultural work songs were rhythmic, a cappella songs intended to increase productivity while reducing feelings of boredom. Rhythms of work songs, similar to an African drum beat, served to synchronize physical movement in groups, coordinating sowing, hoeing, and harvesting. The usage of verses in work songs were sometimes improvised and sung differently each time. Improvisation provided singers with a subversive form of expression. Enslaved people sang improvised verses to mock their overseers, express frustrations, and share dreams of escaping. Many work songs served to create connection and familiarity between workers.

Yankee Doodle is thought to have started out as a harvest song, its words possibly originating from farmers in 15th century Holland. It contained mostly nonsensical and out-of-place words that were presumably sung to a similar—if not the same—tune: "Yanker, didel, doodle down, Diddle, dudel, lanther, Yanke viver, voover vown, Botermilk und tanther." Farm laborers in Holland at the time received as their wages "as much buttermilk (Botermilk) as they could drink, and a tenth (tanther) of the grain". Music researchers pointed out that these songs highlighted how people spoke, the gender roles, and how workers migrated to different parts of the world.

=== African-American work songs ===
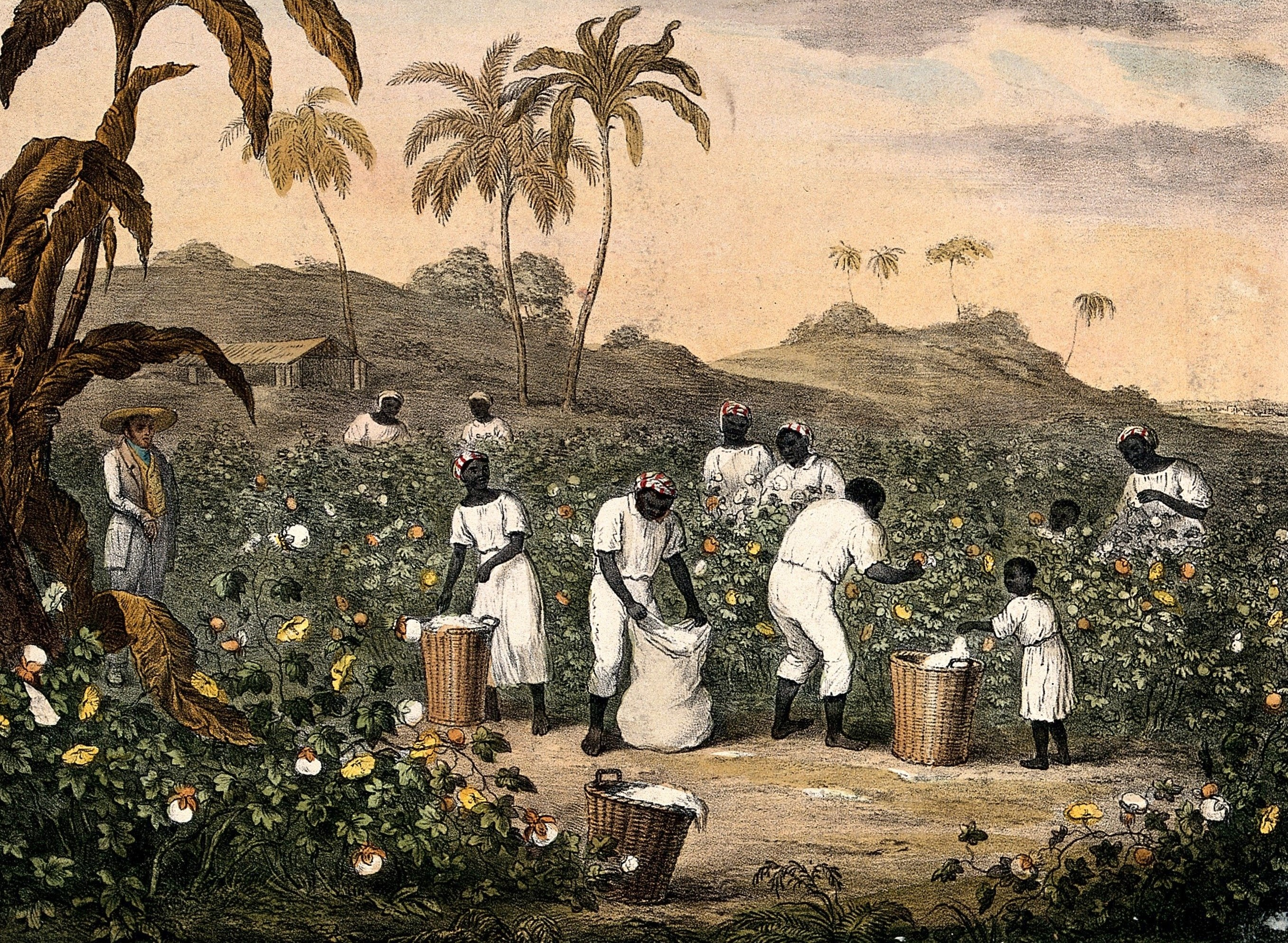
Slaves picking cotton in the United States, 1840.

African-American work songs originally developed in the era of slavery, between the seventeenth and nineteenth centuries. Because they were part of an almost entirely oral culture, they had no fixed form and only began to be recorded as the era of slavery came to an end after 1865. Slave Songs of the United States was the first collection of African-American "slave songs". It was published in 1867 by William Francis Allen, Charles Pickard Ware, and Lucy McKim Garrison. Though this text included many songs by slaves, other texts have also been published that include work songs. Many songs sung by slaves have their origins in African song traditions, and may have been sung to remind the Africans of home, while others were instituted by the captors to raise morale and keep Africans working in rhythm. They have also been seen as a means of withstanding hardship and expressing anger and frustration through creativity or covert verbal opposition. Similarly, work songs have been used as a form of rebellion and resistance. Specifically, African-American women work songs have a particular history and center on resistance and self-care. Work songs helped to pass down information about the lived experience of enslaved people to their communities and families.

A common feature of African-American songs was the call-and-response format, where a leader would sing a verse or verses and the others would respond with a chorus. This came from African traditions of agricultural work song and found its way into the spirituals that developed once Africans in bondage began to convert to Christianity and from there to both gospel music and the blues. The call and response format showcases the ways in which work songs foster dialogue. The importance of dialogue is illuminated in many African-American traditions and continues on to the present day. Particular to the African call and response tradition is the overlapping of the call and response. The leader's part might overlap with the response, thus creating a unique collaborative sound. Similarly, African-American folk and traditional music focuses on polyphony rather than a melody with a harmony. Often, there will be multiple rhythmic patterns used in the same song "resulting in a counterpoint of rhythms." The focus on polyphony also allows for improvisation, a component that is crucial to African-American work songs. As scholar Tilford Brooks writes, "improvisation is utilized extensively in Black folk songs, and it is an essential element especially in songs that employ the call-and-response pattern." Brooks also notes that often in a work song, "the leader has license to improvise on the melody in [their] call, while the response usually repeats its basic melody line without change." Also evident were field hollers, shouts, and moans, which may have been originally designed for different bands or individuals to locate each other and narrative songs that used folk tales and folk motifs, often making use of homemade instruments. In early African captivity drums were used to provide rhythm, but they were banned in later years because of the fear that Africans would use them to communicate in a rebellion; nevertheless, Africans managed to generate percussion and percussive sounds, using other instruments or their own bodies. In the 1950s, there are very few examples of work songs linked to cotton picking.

Corn, however, was a very common subject of work songs on a typical plantation. Because the crop was the main component of most Africans' diet, they would often sing about it regardless of whether it was being harvested. Often, communities in the south would hold "corn-shucking jubilees", during which an entire community of planters would gather on one plantation. The planters would bring their harvests, as well as their enslaved workers, and work such as shucking corn, rolling logs, or threshing rice would be done, accompanied by the singing of Africans doing work. The following is an example of a song Africans would sing as they approached one of these festivals. It is from ex bonded African William Wells Brown's memoir " My Southern Home".

All them pretty gals will be there,
Shuck that corn before you eat;
They will fix it for us rare,
Shuck that corn before you eat.
I know that supper will be big,
Shuck that corn before you eat;
I think I smell a fine roast pig,
Shuck that corn before you eat.

— Slaves in the Antebellum South

These long, mournful, antiphonal songs accompanied the work on cotton plantations, under the driver's lash.

— Tony Palmer, All You Need is Love: The Story of Popular Music.

Work songs were used by African-American railroad work crews in the southern United States before modern machinery became available in the 1960s. Anne Kimzey of the Alabama Center For Traditional Culture writes: "All-black gandy dancer crews used songs and chants as tools to help accomplish specific tasks and to send coded messages to each other so as not to be understood by the foreman and others. The lead singer, or caller, would chant to his crew, for example, to realign a rail to a certain position. His purpose was to uplift his crew, both physically and emotionally, while seeing to the coordination of the work at hand. It took a skilled, sensitive caller to raise the right chant to fit the task at hand and the mood of the men. Using tonal boundaries and melodic style typical of the blues, each caller had his own signature. The effectiveness of a caller to move his men has been likened to how a preacher can move a congregation."

Another common type of African-American work song was the "boat song". Sung by slaves who had the job of rowing, this type of work song is characterized by "plaintive, melancholy singing." These songs were not somber because the work was more troublesome than the work of harvesting crops. Rather, they were low-spirited so that they could maintain the slow, steady tempo needed for rowing. In this way, work songs followed the African tradition, emphasizing the importance of activities being accompanied by the appropriate song.

The historian Sylviane Diouf and ethnomusicologist Gerhard Kubik identify Islamic music as an influence on field holler music. Diouf notes a striking resemblance between the Islamic call to prayer (originating from Bilal ibn Rabah, a famous Abyssinian African Muslim in the early 7th century) and 19th-century field holler music, noting that both have similar lyrics praising God, melody, note changes, "words that seem to quiver and shake" in the vocal cords, dramatic changes in musical scales, and nasal intonation. She attributes the origins of field holler music to African Muslim slaves who accounted for an estimated 30% of African slaves in America. According to Kubik, "the vocal style of many blues singers using melisma, wavy intonation, and so forth is a heritage of that large region of West Africa that had been in contact with the Arabic-Islamic world of the Maghreb since the seventh and eighth centuries." There was particularly a significant trans-Saharan cross-fertilization between the musical traditions of the Maghreb and the Sahel.

=== Sea shanties ===
Work songs sung by sailors between the eighteenth and twentieth centuries are known as sea shanties. These songs were typically performed while adjusting the rigging, raising anchor, and other tasks where men would need to pull in rhythm. These songs usually have a very punctuated rhythm precisely for this reason, along with a call-and-answer format. Well before the nineteenth century, sea songs were common on rowing vessels. Such songs were also very rhythmic in order to keep the rowers together. Because many cultures used slaves to row, some of these songs might also be considered slave songs. Improvised verses sung by sailors spoke of ills with work conditions and captains. These songs were performed with and without the aid of a drum.

=== Cowboy songs ===
Western music was directly influenced by the folk music traditions of immigrants in the nineteenth century as they moved west. They reflected the realities of the range and ranch houses where the music originated, played a major part in combating the loneliness and boredom that characterised cowboy life and western life in general. Such songs were often accompanied on portable instruments of guitars, fiddles, concertina and harmonica. In the nineteenth century cowboy bands developed and cowboy songs began to be collected and published from the early twentieth century with books like John Lomax's Cowboy Songs and Other Frontier Ballads (1910). As cowboys were romanticised in the mid-twentieth century they became extremely popular and played a part in the development of country and western music.

=== Industrial folk song ===
Industrial folk song emerged in Britain in the eighteenth century, as workers took the forms of music with which they were familiar, including ballads and agricultural work songs, and adapted them to their new experiences and circumstances. Unlike agricultural work songs, it was often unnecessary to use music to synchronise actions between workers, as the pace would be increasingly determined by water, steam, chemical and eventually electric power, and frequently impossible because of the noise of early industry.

As a result, industrial folk songs tended to be descriptive of work, circumstances, or political in nature, making them amongst the earliest protest songs and were sung between work shifts or in leisure hours, rather than during work. This pattern can be seen in textile production, mining and eventually steel, shipbuilding, rail working and other industries. As other nations industrialised their folk song underwent a similar process of change, as can be seen for example in France, where Saint-Simon noted the rise of 'Chansons Industriale' among cloth workers in the early nineteenth century, and in the USA where industrialisation expanded rapidly after the Civil War.

A.L. Lloyd defined the industrial work song as 'the kind of vernacular songs made by workers themselves directly out of their own experiences, expressing their own interest and aspirations...'. Lloyd also pointed to various types of song, including chants of labour, love and erotic occupational songs and industrial protest songs, which included narratives of disasters (particularly among miners), laments for conditions, as well as overtly political strike ballads. He also noted the existence of songs about heroic and mythical figures of industrial work, like the coal miners the 'Big Hewer' or 'Big Isaac' Lewis.

This tendency was even more marked in early American industrial songs, where representative heroes like Casey Jones and John Henry were eulogised in blues ballads from the nineteenth century.

=== Folk revival ===
In the 1930s, Lead Belly (Huddie Ledbetter) was recorded in prison by the folklorist Alan Lomax. Lead Belly knew hundreds of work hollers and traditional songs from the cotton fields, railroads and prison gangs. In the 1940s he toured widely on college campuses and folk music venues, popularising songs including "Take This Hammer", "John Henry" "Boll Weevil" and "Midnight Special". His repertoire was a major influence on the Folk Revival of the 1950s and 1960s. Mining songs written in the late 1940s by country artists Merle Travis ("Sixteen Tons" and "Dark as a Dungeon") and Billy Edd Wheeler ("Coal Tattoo") also became fireside standards.

The working class was glorified in Marxist theory and practice, and a strong link between work songs and activism developed in the USA and elsewhere. The "dustbowl balladeer" Woody Guthrie wrote and performed work-related songs such as "Deportee" and "Talking Hard Work" in the 1940s and 1950s. Guthrie and other politically active performers, especially the Weavers with Pete Seeger, continued the Union Songs movement that had begun with Joe Hill in the early 1900s. From that time, most topical and activist singers including Joan Baez, Bob Dylan and Phil Ochs performed work-related songs. Rock performers with working-class leanings such as Bruce Springsteen have also been influenced by the genre.

In Britain, Ewan MacColl and Peggy Seeger produced hundreds of albums of political and traditional songs, writing many songs referring to industrial and working conditions. Folk or folk-rock performers including Steeleye Span, Fairport Convention, The Watersons, Dick Gaughan, Capercaillie, Billy Bragg, James Fagan and Nancy Kerr have featured work songs in their performances.

In Australia, shearing songs and droving songs featured strongly in the first traditional songs to be collected in the field in the 1950s. Merv Lilley and Dorothy Hewett wrote work poems that were set to music during the early 1960s folk revival and became standards, such as the call-and-reply canecutting song "Cane Killed Abel" and one of the first songs about the social and environmental damage caused by industrialisation, "Weevils in the Flour". Alternative rock bands like Midnight Oil and Goanna passed the tradition to a broader audience.

With the end of the folk boom in the 1970s and the rise of the introspective singer-songwriter, the genre lost its wide public appeal, but work songs have continued to be very popular throughout the folk scene, at protest gatherings and with union choirs.

=== Women's work songs ===
Waulking songs from Scotland are a traditional genre performed while women communally beat and felted cloth.

Lacemakers in the English East Midlands, Flanders, and Saxony chanted lace tells—catchy rhymes about lace manufacture and morbid subjects—to the rhythm of their work. The surviving corpus of English lace tells make up a substantial proportion of surviving English women's work songs.

Some women's work songs have been created within modern genres. There are several women's songs titled "9 to 5". Cher's "Working Girl" is also an office work anthem. Donna Summer's "She Works Hard for the Money" is disco/techno and refers to the working class and middle class women.

== See also ==
- Military cadence
- Waulking song
- The Volga Boatmen's Song
- Gandydancer
- Ranz des Vaches
