= Roll, Jordan, Roll =

American folk song and spiritual

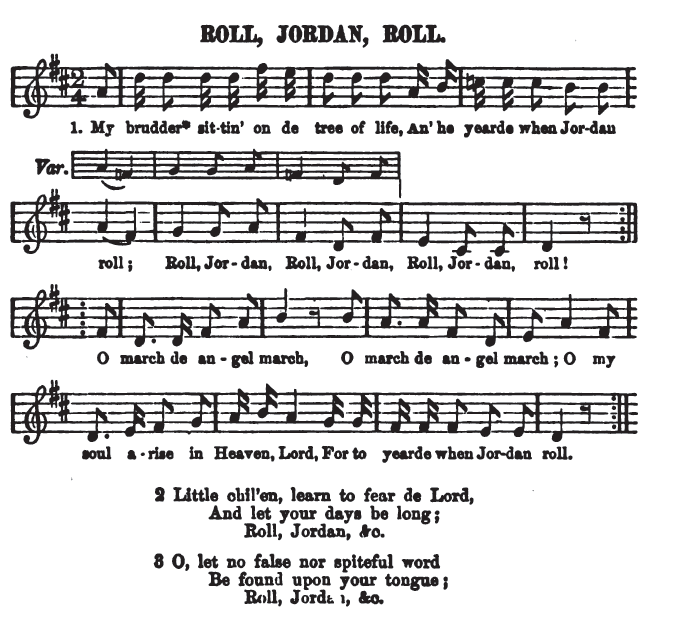
- Version of the song included in Slave Songs of the United States (1867)
- Genre: Spiritual

"Roll, Jordan, Roll" (Roud 6697), also "Roll, Jordan", is a spiritual created by enslaved African Americans, developed from a song written by Isaac Watts in the 18th century which became well known among slaves in the United States during the 19th century. Appropriated as a coded message for escape, by the end of the American Civil War it had become known through much of the eastern United States. In the 19th century, it helped inspire blues, and it remains a staple in gospel music.

== History ==
The tune known as "Roll, Jordan, Roll" may have its origins in the hymn "There is a Land of Pure Delight" written by Isaac Watts in the 18th century. It was introduced to the United States by the early 19th century, in states such as Kentucky and Virginia, as part of the Second Great Awakening, and often sung at camp meetings.

The song soon became popular with enslaved people. According to Ann Powers of NPR, it became a "primary example of slaves' claiming and subverting a Christian message to express their own needs and send their own messages". The River Jordan of the song became a coded message for escape, calling to mind the Mississippi or Ohio Rivers, both of which led to the slave-free northern United States and thus freedom. The song was collected and arranged by Lucy McKim in 1862. In the same year, she sent a letter with some recordings from her trip to St. Helena Island to Dwight's Journal of Music, where it was published in 1863.

The American war journalist Charles Carleton Coffin, who heard a performance of the song in Blythewood, South Carolina, in 1863, described "Roll, Jordan, Roll" as already having become a favourite song, with many versions to be found. A year later, a version was published in Slave Songs of the United States (compiled by abolitionists William Francis Allen, Lucy McKim Garrison, and Charles Pickard Ware). The editors, who positioned the song "in a place of honor" as the first entry in the book, noted that the song could be found from South Carolina down to Florida, and described it as "one of the best known and noblest" of Black spirituals. By 1920 over fifty publications had reproduced or referenced the song.

"Roll, Jordan, Roll" influenced a variety of songs. The refrain of Stephen Foster's "Camptown Races", for instance, is considerably similar to the spiritual, and the melodies likewise have parallels. By the early 20th century, Stephen Calt writes, "Roll, Jordan, Roll" had influenced the creation of a new genre, blues, though likely through an undocumented secular version of the song. He finds compositional similarities in "Roll, Jordan, Roll" and all blues songs. Early blues songs, such as "Bad-luck Blues" (1927) and "Cool Drink of Water" (1928), used a similar structure to that of "Roll, Jordan, Roll". "Roll, Jordan, Roll", meanwhile, became a standard of the Fisk Jubilee Singers and has remained a staple of gospel music.

Bing Crosby included the song in a medley on his album 101 Gang Songs (1961).

In 1962 Eugene D. Genovese began writing his book Roll, Jordan, Roll. In the book, he took a stance between ideology and idealism in regards to historical and literary studies of slavery. His work critiqued ideology. He adapted Antonio Gramsci's notion of cultural hegemony to reinterpret the master-slave relationship, and he focused on slave culture, ignoring economic determinism.

The song and its melody are a principle theme of Alan Plater's three-part radio play The Devil's Music (2001) (comprising Roll Jordan Roll, The Great Pork Pie Mystery, and Beacons), which is based on stories from the Women's Jazz Archive (now called Jazz Heritage), particularly that of the Fisk Jubilee Singers.

The song was adapted, together with several other Black spirituals, by Nicholas Britell for the 2013 film 12 Years a Slave, Steve McQueen's adaptation of the memoir by Solomon Northup. Britell, in an interview with The Hollywood Reporter, stated that he felt compelled to rearrange the song because "it was very important to create a world that was very unique", and the original lyrics were already well known. Powers found that the film's use of "Roll, Jordan, Roll" served as a counterpoint to "Run, Nigger, Run", a song of warning appropriated by the White overseer John Tibeats (portrayed by Paul Dano): where "Run, Nigger, Run" is used as a "taunt" to break the slaves' spirits, "Roll, Jordan, Roll" serves to reaffirm the character Northup's desire to not just survive, but live.

== Composition, contents, and performance ==
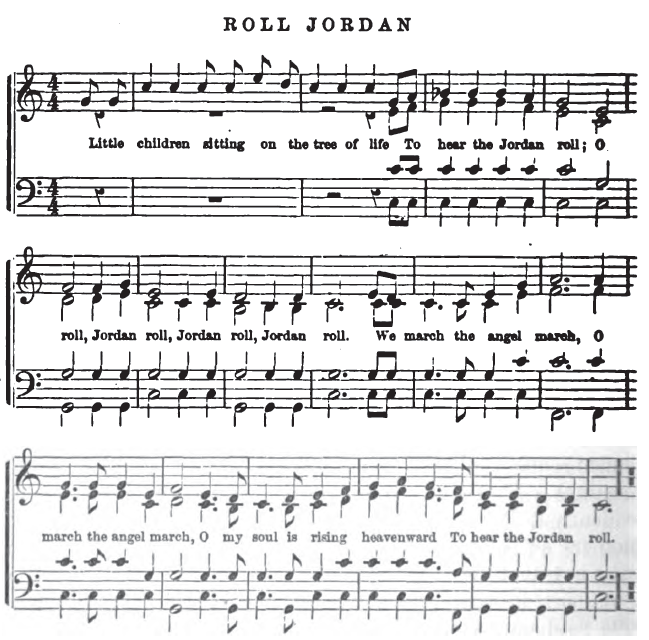
Version of the song included in Four Years of Fighting (1866)

"Roll, Jordan, Roll" is constructed as four-bar phrases, with a ten-beat line followed by a six-beat refrain. The first two phrases close with a keynote, and the lyrics are presented with an AABB rhyme scheme. This construction, according to Calt, was reflected in the construction of blues songs in the early 20th century.

The Jordan of the song's lyrics is a reference to the River Jordan, which in Biblical tradition the Israelites crossed to enter the Promised Land. As such, by crossing the Jordan River, the singers are expected to be able to set down their burdens and live life without trouble. Owing to this symbolism, songs related to the River Jordan were not uncommon; Newman Ivey White, writing in 1928, noted that several writers had commented on slaves' fondness for including the river in their spirituals.

Coffin recorded performances of the song as substituting the names of audience members or participants as sitting on the Tree of Life, for instance a Mr. Jones, with each progressive rendition of the song substituting a different individual. Elizabeth Kilham, who listened to the song in a church, noticed a similar trend. However, rather than name members of the congregation, the version sung by the church went through a number of Biblical figures, including Jesus, the archangel Gabriel, and the prophet Moses. This was followed by friends and relatives, including "my fader" and "my mudder", before ultimately culminating with a number of people respected by the congregation, including former president Abraham Lincoln and Union general Oliver O. Howard. As the performance continued, it became more enthusiastic. Coffin describes the performance:

They [the performers] beat time, at first, with their hands, then their feet. ... They go round in a circle, shuffling, jerking, shouting louder and louder, while those outside of the circle responds with increasing vigor, all stamping, clapping their hands, and rolling out the chorus. William [a performer] seems to be in a trance, his eyes are fixed, yet he goes on with a double-shuffle, till the perspiration stands in beads upon his face. Every joint seems hung on wires. Feet, legs, arms, head, body, and hands swing and jump like a child's dancing Dandy Jim. ... Thus it went on till nature was exhausted.

== See also ==
- Roll, Jordan, Roll, a photographic collaboration showing the lives of former slaves and their descendants on a plantation in the Gullah coastal region of South Carolina

== Works cited ==
- Allen, William Francis; Garrison, Lucy McKim; Ware, Charles Pickard, eds. (1867). Slave Songs of the United States. New York: Peter Smith. OCLC 220782519.
- Calt, Stephen (2008). I'd Rather Be the Devil: Skip James and the Blues. Chicago: Chicago Review Press. ISBN 978-1-56976-996-6.
- Chase, Gilbert (1992). America's Music: From the Pilgrims to the Present. Chicago: University of Illinois Press. ISBN 978-0-252-06275-9.
- Coffin, Charles Carleton (1866). Four Years of Fighting: A Volume of Personal Observation with the Army and Navy, from the First Battle of Bull Run to the Fall of Richmond. Boston: Ticknor and Fields. OCLC 3351438.
- Girkout, Alexa (9 December 2013). "'12 Years a Slave' Composer Reveals the Challenges of Re-Creating Authentic Slave Songs". The Hollywood Reporter. Archived from the original on 12 December 2013.
- Hudson, Cheryl; Namusoke, Eva (2017). Roll, Jordan, Roll: The World the Slaves Made. CRC Press. p. 100. ISBN 9781351351058.
- Kilham, Elizabeth (1870). "Sketches in Color". Putnam's Magazine: 31–38, 205–10, 304–11.
- Powers, Ann (13 November 2013). "'12 Years A Slave' Is This Year's Best Film About Music". NPR. Archived from the original on 17 March 2014.
- Pruett, Laura Moore (2007). Louis Moreau Gottschalk, John Sullivan Dwight, and the Development of Musical Culture in the United States, 1853-1865 (Thesis). Florida State University. OCLC 234444031.
- Southern, Eileen; Wright, Josephine, eds. (1990). African-American Traditions in Song, Sermon, Tale, and Dance, 1600s–1920: An Annotated Bibliography of Literature, Collections, and Artworks. New York: Greenwood Press. ISBN 978-0-313-24918-1.
- White, Newman Ivey (1928). American Negro Folk-Songs. Cambridge: Harvard University Press. ISBN 9780674012592. OCLC 411447.
