= Dem Bones =

American traditional spiritual song

"Dem Bones" (also called "Dry Bones" and "Dem Dry Bones") is a spiritual song. The melody was composed by author and songwriter James Weldon Johnson (1871–1938) and his brother, J. Rosamond Johnson. It was first recorded by The Famous Myers Jubilee Singers in 1928. Both a long and a shortened version of the song are widely known. The lyrics are inspired by Ezekiel 37:1–14, in which the prophet Ezekiel visits the Valley of Dry Bones and prophesies that they will one day be resurrected at God's command, picturing the realization of the New Jerusalem.

== The song ==
The chorus and verses are noted for many variations among performers, but fall into the following style. The second verse reverses the first in a pattern similar to:

The neck bone (dis)connected from the head bone
... etc...

Intro 1
Dem bones Dem bones Dem dry bones
Dem bones Dem bones Dem dry bones
Dem bones Dem bones Dem dry bones,
Hear the word of the Lord.

Verse 1
Toe bone connected to the foot bone
Foot bone connected to the heel bone
Heel bone connected to the ankle bone
Ankle bone connected to the leg bone
Leg bone connected to the knee bone
Knee bone connected to the thigh bone
Thigh bone connected to the hip bone
Hip bone connected to the back bone
Back bone connected to the shoulder bone
Shoulder bone connected to the neck bone
Neck bone connected to the head bone
Hear the word of the Lord.

Chorus
Dem bones, dem bones gonna walk around.
Dem bones, dem bones gonna walk around.
Dem bones, dem bones gonna walk around.
Now hear the word of the Lord.

Intro 2
Dem bones Dem bones Dem dry bones
Dem bones Dem bones Dem dry bones
Dem bones Dem Bones Dem dry bones,
Hear the word of the Lord.

Verse 2
Head bone (dis)connected from the neck bone
Neck bone connected from the shoulder bone
Shoulder bone connected from the back bone
Back bone connected from the hip bone
Hip bone connected from the thigh bone
Thigh bone connected from the knee bone
Knee bone connected from the leg bone
Leg bone connected from the ankle bone
Ankle bone connected from the heel bone
Heel bone connected from the foot bone
Foot bone connected from the toe bone
Hear the word of the Lord.

Chorus
Dem bones, dem bones gonna walk around.
Dem bones, dem bones gonna walk around.
Dem bones, dem bones gonna walk around.
Hear the word of the Lord.

Finale
Dem bones, dem bones, dem dry bones.
Dem bones, dem bones, dem dry bones.
Dem bones, dem bones, dem dry bones.
Hear the word of the Lord.

== See also ==
- "Ezekiel Saw the Wheel"
- Christian child's prayer § Spirituals
- "Drinkin' Bone", country song whose lyrics allude to “Dem Bones”
