= Spirituals =

Black American music genre

Spiritual
- Stylistic origins: Work songs; Field holler; African music; Christian hymns
- Cultural origins: African Americans
- Derivative forms: Blues; Black gospel music

Fusion genres
- CCM

Spirituals (also known as Negro spirituals, African American spirituals, Black spirituals, or spiritual music) is a genre of Christian music that is associated with African Americans, which merged varied African cultural influences with the experiences of being held in bondage in slavery, at first during the transatlantic slave trade and for centuries afterwards, through the domestic slave trade. Spirituals incorporate the "sing songs", work songs, and plantation songs that evolved into the blues and gospel songs in church. In the nineteenth century, the word "spirituals" referred to all these subcategories of folk songs. While they were often rooted in biblical stories, they also described the extreme hardships endured by African Americans who were enslaved from the 17th century until the 1860s, the emancipation altering mainly the nature (but not continuation) of slavery for many. Many new derivative music genres such as the blues emerged from the spirituals songcraft. These songs were used to share coded messages, unite people, express feelings and emotions, and to keep their culture alive throughout the generations. They eventually were performed in churches, schools, and concerts. This form of African-American heritage influenced music around the world.

Beyond their musical significance, spirituals played a crucial role in encouraging and uplifting African Americans throughout history. These songs provided hope, comfort, and resilience during the darkest periods of slavery and segregation. Singing together allowed enslaved individuals to build solidarity, maintain a sense of community, and draw strength from shared struggles. Spirituals often incorporated biblical themes of deliverance and liberation, resonating with listeners who longed for freedom and justice. By turning to stories such as the Exodus, African Americans found inspiration and a spiritual framework to endure hardship and keep faith in the possibility of a better future.

The tradition of spirituals began in the early 1700s among enslaved Africans in the American South, particularly on plantations where communal singing was both a survival strategy and a subtle form of resistance. This genre emerged from the blending of African musical traditions with Christian hymns introduced by missionaries and slaveholders. Spirituals first flourished in secret worship meetings, also known as “hush harbors,” where enslaved people gathered away from the eyes of overseers. Over time, spirituals spread to camp meetings and revivals, becoming central to African American religious and cultural expression. Through these songs, generations found the encouragement and unity needed to persevere and eventually challenge the institution of slavery.

Not only did African Americans have to mask their singing, they also had to worship in secret. The “invisible church” refers to the secret religious gatherings formed by enslaved African Americans when they were denied the freedom to worship openly or express their own spiritual practices. These hidden meetings took place in remote areas such as woods, cabins, or secluded clearings and allowed enslaved people to combine Christian teachings with African traditions in ways that were not permitted under the watchful eyes of enslavers. Within these gatherings, participants could pray, sing, and testify without fear of punishment, creating a spiritual community rooted in shared struggle and hope. The musical practices that developed in the invisible church—especially call-and-response singing, ring shouts, and improvised spirituals—became essential foundations of African American sacred music. These songs carried layered meanings, offering both religious comfort and coded messages of resistance or escape. The invisible church ultimately provided emotional strength, cultural preservation, and a sense of collective identity, shaping African American musical and religious life for generations.

Prior to the end of the US Civil War and emancipation, spirituals were originally an oral tradition passed from one slave generation to the next. Biblical stories were memorized then translated into song. Following emancipation, the lyrics of spirituals were published in printed form. Ensembles such as the Fisk Jubilee Singers—established in 1871—popularized spirituals, bringing them to a wider, even international, audience.

At first, major recording studios were only recording white musicians performing spirituals and their derivatives. That changed with Mamie Smith's commercial success in 1920. Starting in the 1920s, the commercial recording industry increased the audience for the spirituals and their derivatives.

Black composers Harry Burleigh and R. Nathaniel Dett created a "new repertoire for the concert stage" by applying their Western classical education to the spirituals. While the spirituals were created by a "circumscribed community of people in bondage", over time they became known as the first "signature" music of the United States.

== Terminology ==
The New Grove Dictionary of Music and Musicians—one of the largest reference works on music and musicians—itemized and described "spiritual" in its electronic resource, Grove Music Online, an important part of Oxford Music Online, as a "type of sacred song created by and for African Americans that originated in oral tradition. Although its exact provenance is unknown, spirituals were identifiable as a genre by the early 19th century." The term was generally employed without the descriptor "African American".

"Negro spirituals" is a 19th-century term that according to writer Arthur Evans was "used for songs with religious texts created by African Enslaved in America". The first published book of slave songs referred to them as "spirituals".

In musicology and ethnomusicology in the 1990s, the single term "spirituals" is used to describe "The Spirituals Project".

The US Library of Congress uses the phrase "African American Spirituals" for the numbered and itemized entry. In the introductory phrase, the singular form is used without the adjective "African American." Throughout the encyclopedia entry, the singular and plural forms of the term are used without the "African American" descriptor. The Library's introductory sentence observes that "A spiritual is a type of religious folksong that is most closely associated with the enslavement of African people in the American South. The songs proliferated in the last few decades of the eighteenth century leading up to the abolishment of legalized slavery in the 1860s. The African American spiritual (also called the Negro Spiritual) constitutes one of the largest and most significant forms of American folksong."

== Context ==
The transatlantic slave trade is described by a United Nations report as the largest forced migration in recorded human history. As a direct result of the transatlantic slave trade, the greatest movement of Africans was to the Americas—with 96 percent of the captives from the African coasts arriving on cramped slave ships at ports in South America and the Caribbean Islands. From 1501 to 1830, four Africans crossed the Atlantic for every one European, making the demographics of the Americas in that era more of an extension of the African diaspora than a European one. The legacy of this migration is evident today, with large populations of people of African descent living throughout the Americas.

From 1501 through 1867, approximately "12.5 million Africans" from "almost every country with an Atlantic coastline" were kidnapped and coerced into slavery, according to the 2015 Atlas based on about 35,000 slaving voyages. Roughly 6% of all enslaved Africans transported via the trans-Atlantic slave trade arrived in the United States, both before and after the colonial era; the remainder went to Brazil, the West Indies or other regions. The majority of these Africans came from the West African slave coast.

The Portuguese Empire transported the first African enslaved peoples to the New World in the 1560s, and until the 1700s Mexico was the primary destination for those captives under Spanish control. The first African enslaved people in what is now the United States arrived in 1526, making landfall in present-day Winyah Bay, South Carolina in a short-lived colony called San Miguel de Gualdape under control of the Spanish Empire. They were also the first enslaved Africans in North Americas to stage a slave rebellion. In 1619, the first slave ship had carried twenty people from the west central African kingdom of Kongo—to a life of enslavement in what is now Mexico. The Kingdom of Kongo, at that time stretched over an area of 60,000 miles (97,000 km) in the watershed of the Congo River—the second longest river in Africa—and had a population of 2.5 million—was one of the largest African kingdoms. For a brief period, King João I of Kongo, who reigned from 1470 to 1509, had voluntarily converted to Catholicism, and for close to three centuries—from 1491 to 1750—the kingdom of Kongo had practiced Christianity and was an "independent [and] cosmopolitan realm." The descendants of the rice-plantation enslaved Gullah people—whose country of origin is Sierra Leone—were unique because they had been much more isolated on the islands off the coast of South Carolina. Gullah spirituals are sung in a Creole language that was influenced by African American Vernacular English with the majority of African words coming from the Akan, Yoruba and Igbo. The institution of slavery in the United States ended with the conclusion of the US Civil War in 1865 (aside from the exception in the Thirteenth Amendment allowing slavery for prisoners).

The domestic slave trade that emerged after the United States Congress outlawed the international slave trade in 1808 and lasted until the U.S. Civil War destroyed generations of African American families. Slavery in the United States differed from the institution in other regions of the Americas, such as the West Indies, Dutch Guiana and Brazil.The U.S. system was unique because it became a self-sustaining factory of human misery. Survival did not equate to better treatment, it meant the system was efficient at keeping people alive long enough to reproduce and work. There is no evidence of better treatment in the U.S. During that period, "approximately 1.2 million men, women, and children, the vast majority of whom were born in America," were displaced—spouses were separated from one another, and parents were separated from their children. By 1850, most enslaved African Americans were "third-, fourth-, or fifth-generation Americans." In the 1800s, the majority of enslaved people in the British West Indies and Brazil had been born in Africa, whereas in the United States, they were "generations removed from Africa."

== Overview ==
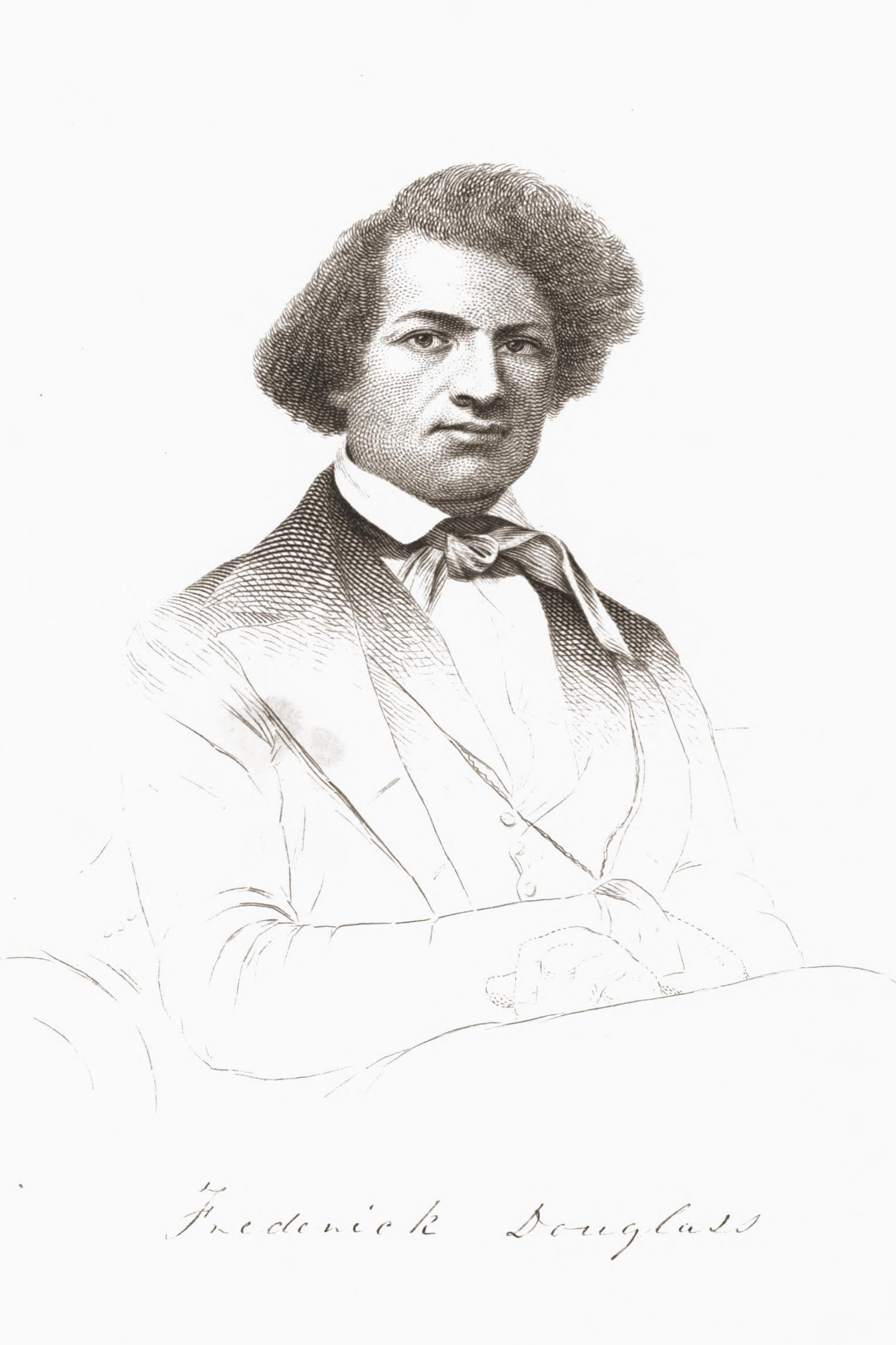
Engraving of Douglass from his 1845 narrative

In his 1845 Narrative of the Life of Frederick Douglass, an American Slave, an essay on abolition and a memoire, Frederick Douglass (1818–1895)—a great orator—described slave songs as telling a "tale which was then altogether beyond my feeble comprehension; they were tones, loud, long and deep, breathing the prayer and complaint of souls boiling over with the bitterest anguish. Every tone was a testimony against slavery, and a prayer to God for deliverance from chains… Those songs still follow me, to deepen my hatred of slavery, and quicken my sympathies for my brethren in bonds." His Narrative, which is the most famous of the stories written by former enslaved at that time, is one of the most influential pieces of literature that acted as a catalyst in the early years of the American abolitionist movement, according to the OCLC entry. Slave songs were called "Sorrow songs" by W.E.B. Du Bois in his 1903 book, The Souls of Black Folk.

Hansonia Caldwell, the author of African American music, spirituals: the fundamental communal music of Black Americans and African American music: a chronology : 1619–1995, said that spirituals "sustained Africans when they were enslaved." She described them as "code songs" that "would announce meetings, as in "Steal Away", and describe the path for running away, as in "Follow the Drinkin' Gourd". "Go Down Moses" referred to Harriet Tubman – that was her nickname—so that when they heard that song, they knew she was coming to the area...I often call the spiritual an omnibus term, because there are lots of different [subcategories] under it. They used to sing songs as they worked in the fields. In the church, it evolved into the gospel song. In the fields, it became the blues." Hansonia Caldwell, who was a professor of music at California State University, Dominguez Hills (CSUDH) from 1972 to 2011, also oversaw an Archive of Sacred Music at CSUDH—an extensive collection of music, books, periodicals, documents, audio & visual materials, and oral histories."

"The African American spiritual (also called the Negro Spiritual) constitutes one of the largest and most significant forms of American folksong," according to a Library of Congress 2016 article.

Spirituals were originally oral, but by 1867 the first compilation, entitled "Slave Songbook", was published. In the book's preface, one of the co-compilers, William Francis Allen, traced the "development of Negro Spirituals and cultural connections to Africa." The 1867 publication included spirituals that were well-known and regularly sung in American churches but whose origins in plantations, had not been acknowledged. Allen wrote that, it was almost impossible to convey the spirituals in print because of the inimitable quality of African American voices with its "intonations and delicate variations", where not "even one singer" can be "reproduced on paper". Allen described the complexity of songs such as "I can't stay behind, my Lord", or "Turn, sinner, turn O!" which have a "complicated shout" where there are no singing parts, and no two singers "appear to be singing the same thing." The lead "singer starts the words of each verse, often improvising, and the others, who "base" him, as it is called, strike in with the refrain, or even join in the solo, when the words are familiar."

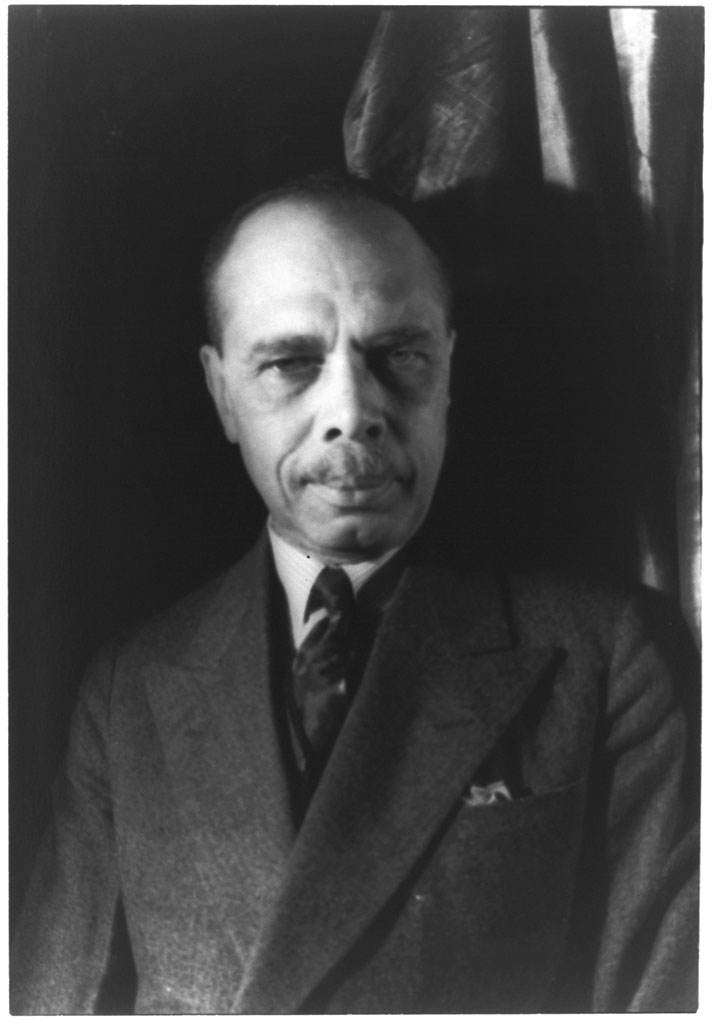
Portrait of James Weldon Johnson in 1932

In their 1925 book, The Books of American Negro Spirituals, James Weldon Johnson and Grace Nail Johnson said that spirituals, which are "purely and solely the creation" of African Americans, represent "America's only type of folk music...When it came to the use of words, the maker of the song was struggling under his limitations in language and, perhaps, also under a misconstruction or misapprehension of the facts in his source of material, generally the Bible." The couple were active during the Harlem Renaissance James Weldon Johnson was the leader of the National Association for the Advancement of Colored People (NAACP).

Arthur C. Jones, a professor in the Musicology, Ethnomusicology and Theory Department at the Lamont School of Music at the University of Denver, founded "The Spirituals Project" to preserve and revitalize the "music and teachings of the sacred folk songs called spirituals," "created and first sung by African Americans in slavery". Spirituals were created by a "circumscribed community of people in bondage", over time they became known as the first "signature" music of the United States. Forbidden to speak their native languages, they generally converted to Christianity. With narrow vocabularies, they used the words they did know to translate biblical information and facts from their other sources into song.

== Cultural origins ==
=== African foundation ===
J.H. Kwabena Nketia (1921–2019), described by the New York Times in 2019 as a "pre-eminent scholar of African music", said in 1973 that there is an important, interdependent, dynamic, and "unbroken conceptual relationship between African and African American music".

Enslaved African Americans "in the plantation South drew on native rhythms and their African heritage." According to a May 2012 PBS interview, "spirituals were religious folks songs, often rooted in biblical stories, woven together, sung, and passed along from one slave generation to another". (Note: PBS correspondent Bob Faw said this in a Religion & Ethics Newsweekly May 2012 interview with members of the Morehouse College Glee Club—the official choral group of the historically black Morehouse College, in Atlanta, Georgia) (Note: Spirituals originated with the enslaved Africans who were brought to British North America and the United States in the 17th, 18th and 19th centuries. Slavery was not abolished in the U.S. until 1865 through the enactment of the Thirteen Amendment when all enslaved people were legally emancipated. See History of slavery in the United States.) (Note: According to a Library of Congress 2016 article, music was central to and permeated every aspect of everyday life and major life events in Africa. Enslaved Africans in America were no longer permitted to worship as Christian colonialists feared "African-infused way of worship". Gatherings had to be conducted in a clandestine manner. During these meetings, worshipers would sing, chant, dance and sometimes enter ecstatic trances. Along with spirituals, shouts also emerged in the Praise Houses. Shouts begin slowly with the shuffling of feet and clapping of hands (but the feet never cross because that was seen as dancing, which was forbidden within the church). Drums were used as they had been in Africa, for communication. When the connection between drumming, communication, and resistance was eventually made, drums were forbidden.)

According to Walter Pitts' 1996 book Old Ship of Zion, spirituals are a musical form that is indigenous and specific to the religious experience of African slaves and their descendants in the United States. Pitts said that they were a result of the interaction of music and religion from Africa with music and religion of European origin.

In a May 2012 PBS interview, Uzee Brown Jr. said that spirituals were the "survival tools for the African slave". Brown said that while other similarly oppressed cultures were "virtually wiped out", the African slave survived because of spirituals by "singing through many of their problems", by creating their own "way of communicating". Enslaved people introduced a number of new instruments to America: the bones, body percussion, and an instrument variously called the bania, banju, or banjar, a precursor to the banjo but without frets. They brought with them from Africa long-standing religious traditions that highlighted the importance of storytelling.

Evidence of the vital role African music has played in the creation of African American spirituals exists, among other elements, in the use of "complex rhythms" and "polyrhythms" from West Africa.

=== Religion in everyday life ===
According to the beliefs of slave religion, the "material and the spiritual are part of an intrinsic unity". Music, religion, and everyday life are inseparable in the spirituals, and through them, religious ideals were infused into the activities of everyday life. The spirituals provided some immunity protecting the African American religion from being colonized, and in this way preserved the "sacred as a potential space of resistance". A 2015 article in the Journal of Black Studies said that it was not surprising therefore that "spirituals were sung primarily as rowing songs, field songs, work songs, and social songs, rather than exclusively within the church." The article described how, "through the use of metonymy (substituting associated words to ostensibly alter the semantic content), spirituals acted as a form of religious education, able to speak simultaneously of material and spiritual freedom", for example in the spiritual, "Steal Away to Jesus".

In William Eleazar Barton's (1899–1972) Old Plantation Hymns, the author wrote that African American "hymns seldom make allusion to the Bible as a source of inspiration. They prefer "heart religion" to "book religion". Barton, who attended services with African Americans, said that they did not sing the "ordinary" hymns that strengthened "assurance by a promise of God in Holy Scripture"; rather, in the African-American hymns, they appeal to a more personal "revelation from the Lord." He cites the examples of "We're Some of the Praying People" and a hymn from Alabama—"Wear a starry crown". He also notes that both these songs have a "threefold repetition and a concluding line." In the latter, we find the "familiar swing and syncopation" of the African American.

Spirituals were not simply different versions of hymns or Bible stories, but rather a creative altering of the material; new melodies and music, refashioned text, and stylistic differences helped to set apart the music as distinctly African-American.

The First Great Awakening, or "Evangelical Revival"—a series of Christian revivals in the 1730s and 1740s swept Great Britain and its North American colonies, resulted in many enslaved people in the colonies being converting to Christianity. During that time northern Baptist and Methodist preachers converted African Americans, including those who were enslaved. In some communities African Americans were accepted into Christian communities as deacons. From 1800 to 1825 enslaved people were exposed to the religious music of camp meetings on the ever-expanding frontier. As African religious traditions declined in America in the 18th and 19th centuries, more African Americans began to convert to Christianity. In a 1982 "scathing critique" of Awakening scholars, Yale University historian, Jon Butler, wrote that the Awakening was a myth that has been constructed by historians in the 18th century who had attempted to use the narrative of the Awakening for their own "religious purposes".

=== Biblical themes ===
By the 17th century, enslaved Africans were familiar with Christian biblical stories, such as the story of Moses and Daniel, seeing their own stories reflected in them. An Africanized form of Christianity evolved in the slave population with African American spirituals providing a way to "express the community's new faith, as well as its sorrows and hopes."

As Africans were exposed to stories from the Bible, they began to see parallels to their own experiences. The story of the exile of the Jews and their captivity in Babylon, resonated with their own captivity.

The lyrics of Christian spirituals reference symbolic aspects of Biblical images such as Moses and Israel's Exodus from Egypt in songs such as "Michael Row the Boat Ashore". There is also a duality in the lyrics of spirituals. They communicated many Christian ideals while also communicating the hardship that was a result of being an enslaved. The river Jordan in traditional African American religious song became a symbolic borderland not only between this world and the next. It could also symbolize travel to the north and freedom or could signify a proverbial border from the status of slavery to living free.

Syncopation, or ragged time, was a natural part of spiritual music. Songs were played on African-inspired instruments.

== Collections of spiritual lyrics ==
African-American spirituals have associations with plantation songs, slave songs, freedom songs, and songs of the Underground Railway, and were oral until the end of the US Civil War. Following the Civil War and emancipation, there has been "extensive collection and preservation of spirituals as folk song tradition". The first collection of Negro spirituals was published in 1867, two years after the war had ended. Entitled Slave Songs of the United States, it was compiled by three northern abolitionists—Charles Pickard Ware (1840–1921), Lucy McKim Garrison (1842–1877), William Francis Allen (1830–1889) (Note: Part I of the collection included songs from the South-Eastern Slave States, including South Carolina, Georgia and the Sea Islands. Of these Charles Pickard Ware collecting songs from the Gullah people of Port Royal Islands, South Carolina. These songs including "Roll, Jordan, Roll", "Jehovah, hallelujah, "I hear from heaven to-day", "Blow your trumpet", "Gabriel", "Praise, member", "Wrestle on, Jacob", "The lonesome valley", "I can't stay behind", "Poor Rosy", "The trouble of the world", "There's a meeting here tonight", "Hold your light", "Happy morning", "No man can hinder me", "Lord, remember me", "Not weary yet", "Religion so sweet", "Hunting for the Lord", "Go in the wilderness", "Tell my Jesus" "Morning", "The graveyard, "John, John, of the holy order", "I saw the beam in my sister's eye", "Hunting for a city", "Gwine follow", Lay this body down", "Heaven bell a ring", "Jine 'em", "Rain fall and wet Becca Lawton", "Bound to go", "Michael row the boat ashore", "Sail, o believer", "Rock o' jubilee", "Stars begin to fall", "King Emanuel", "Satan's camp a-fire", "Give up the world", "Jesus on the water-side", "I wish I been dere", "Build a house in paradise", "I know when I'm going home", "I'm a-trouble in de mind", and "Travel on". William Francis Allen collected these songs on Port Royal Islands: "Archangel open the door", "My body rock 'long fever", "Bell da ring", "Pray all de member", "Turn, sinner, turn o'", "My army cross over", "Join the angel band", "I an' Satan had a race" ROUD # 11993, "Shall I die?", "When we do meet again", "The white marble stone", "I can't stand the fire", "Meet, o Lord", "Wait, Mr. Mackright", "Early in the morning", "Hail Mary", "No more rain fall for wet you", "I want to go home", "Good-bye brother", "Fare ye well", "Many thousand go", "Brother Moses gone", "The sin-sick soul", "Some valiant soldier", "Hallelu, hallelu", "Children do linger", "Good-bye", "Lord, make me more patient", "The day of judgement", "The resurrection morn", "Nobody knows the trouble I've had", "Who is on the Lord's side", "Hold out to the end", "Come go with me", "Every hour in the day", "In the mansions above", "Shout on, children", "Jesus, won't you come by-and-bye!", and "Heave away". Part II included songs from the Northern Seaboard Slave States, including Delaware, Maryland, Virginia, and North Carolina, such as "Wake up, Jacob", "On to glory", "Just new", "Shock along, John", "Round the corn, Sally", "Jordan's mills", "Sabbath has no end", "I don't feel weary", "The hypocrite and the concubine", "O shout away", "O'er the crossing", "Rock o' my soul", "We will march through the valley", "What a trying time", "Almost over", "Don't be weary, traveller", "Let God's saints come in", "The golden altar", "The winter", and "The heaven bells". Part III includes songs from the Inland Slave States, including Tennessee, Arkansas, and the Mississippi River, such as "The gold band", The good old way", I'm going home", Sinner won't die no more", "Brother, guide me home", "Little children, then won't you be glad?", "Charleston gals", "Run, n*, run", "I'm gwine to Alabamy". Part IV includes songs from the Gulf States, including Florida and Louisiana: Miscellaneous: "My father, how long?", "I'm in trouble", "O Daniel", "O brothers, don't get weary", "I want to join the band", "Jacob's ladder", "Pray on", "Good news, member", "I want to die like-a Lazarus die", "Away down in Sunbury", "This is the trouble of the world", "Lean on the Lord's side", "There are all my father's children", "The old ship of Zion", "Come along, Moses", "The social band", "God got plenty o' room", "You must be pure and holy", "Belle Layotte", "Remon", "Caroline", "Calinda", "Lolotte", and "Musieu Bainjo.") The 1867 compilation built on the entire collection of Charles P. Ware, who had mainly collected songs at Coffin's Point, St. Helena Island, South Carolina, home to the African-American Gullah people originally from West Africa. Most of the 1867 book consisted of songs gathered directly from African Americans. By the 1830s at least, "plantation songs", "genuine slave songs", and "Negro melodies", had become extraordinarily popular. Eventually, "spurious imitations" for more "sentimental tastes" were created. The authors noted that "Long time ago", "Near the lake where drooped the willow", and "Way down in Raccoon Hollow" were borrowed from African-American songs. There had been a renewed interest in these songs through the Port Royal Experiment (1861– ), where newly freed African American plantation workers successfully took over operation of Port Royal Island plantations in 1861, where they had formerly been enslaved. Northern abolitionist missionaries, educators and doctors came to oversee Port Royal's development. The authors noted that, by 1867, the "first seven spirituals in this collection" were "regularly sung at church".

In 1869, Colonel Thomas Wentworth Higginson, who commanded the first African-American regiment of the Civil War, the 1st South Carolina Volunteers—"recruited, trained, and stationed at Beaufort, South Carolina" from 1862 to 1863. Higginson admired the former slaves in his regiment saying, "It was their demeanor under arms that shamed the nation into recognizing them as men." He mingled with the soldiers and in published his 1869 memoir Army Life in a Black Regiment in which he included the lyrics of selected spirituals. During the Civil War, Higginson wrote down some of the spirituals he heard in camp. "Almost all their songs were thoroughly religious in their tone, ...and were in a minor key, both as to words and music."

Starting in 1871, the Fisk Jubilee Singers began touring, creating more interest in the "spirituals as concert repertory". By 1872, the Jubilee Singers were publishing their own books of songs, which included "The Gospel Train".

"Swing Low, Sweet Chariot"
"Swing Low, Sweet Chariot" performed by the Fisk Jubilee Singers

Reverend Alexander Reid had attended a Fisk Jubilee Singers' performance in 1871, and suggested they add several songs to their repertoire. Reid, who had been a superintendent at the Spencerville Academy in Oklahoma in Choctaw Nation territory in the 1850s, had heard two workers enslaved by the Choctaw people,—an African-American family—father Wallace Willis and daughter Minerva Willis—singing "their favorite plantation songs" from their cabin door in the evenings. They had learned the songs in "Mississippi in their early youth." Reid provided the Jubilee Singers with the lyrics of "Swing Low, Sweet Chariot", Roll, Jordan, Roll, "The Angels are Coming", "I'm a Rolling", and "Steal Away To Jesus", and others that Willis and his wife had sung. The Jubilee Singers popularized Willis' songs.

== Popularization ==
=== Fisk Jubilee Singers popularized spirituals ===
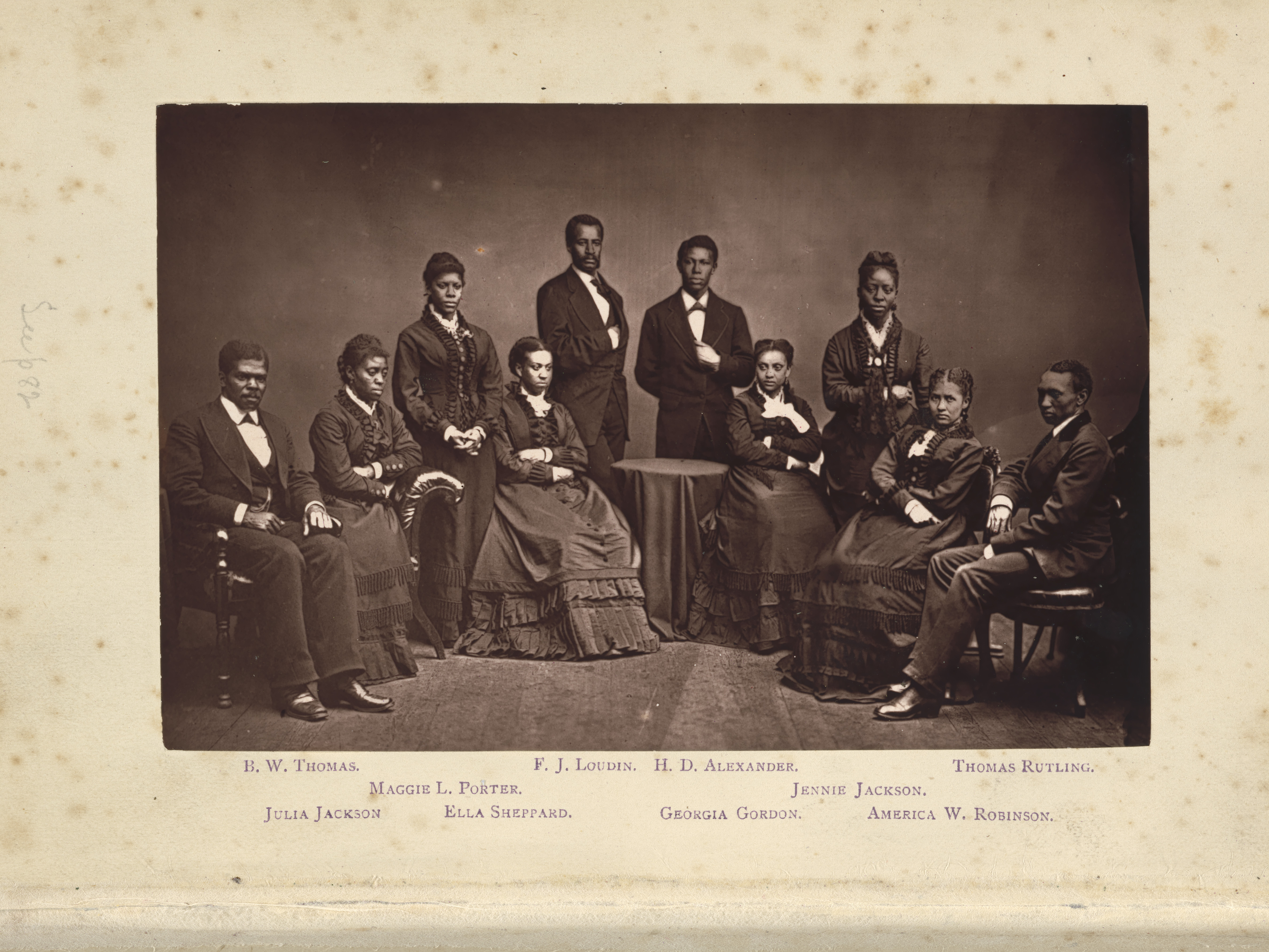
Fisk Jubilee Singers, 1875

The original Fisk Jubilee Singers, a touring a cappella male and female choir of nine students of the newly established Fisk school in Nashville, Tennessee who were active from 1871 to 1878, popularized Negro spirituals. The name "jubilee" referred to the "year of jubilee" in the Old Testament—a time of the emancipation of slaves. On January 9, 1866, shortly after the end of the American Civil War (1861 to May 9, 1865), the American Missionary Association founded the Fisk University in Nashville, Tennessee, the historically black college. As a school-fundraiser, the Fisk Jubilee Singers had their first tour on what is now called Jubilee Day—October 6, 1871. The first audiences were small, local, and skeptical, but by 1872, they performed at Boston's World Peace Festival and at the White House, and in 1873 they toured Europe.

In their early days, the Jubilee Singers did not sing the slave songs. Sheppard—who also composed and arranged music—explained how slave songs, like those published in the 1867 Slave Songs, had not initially been part of the Singers' repertoire because the songs, "were sacred to our parents, who used them in their religious worship and shouted over them." Shephard said that, "It was only after many months that gradually our hearts were opened to the influence of these friends and we began to appreciate the wonderful beauty and power of our songs." Eventually their repertoire began to include these songs.

By 1878 the Singers had disbanded. In 1890 the Singers legacy was revived when Ella Sheppard, Moore—one of the original nine Fisk Jubilee Singers—returned to Fisk and began to coach new jubilee vocalists, including John Wesley Work Jr. (1871–1925). In 1899, Fisk University president E. M. Cravath put out a call for a mixed (male and female) jubilee singers ensemble that would tour on behalf of the university. The full mixed choir became too expensive to tour, and was replaced by John Work II's male quartet. The quartet received "widespread acclaim" and eventually made a series of best-selling recordings for Victor in December 1909, February 1911, for Edison in December 1911, for Columbia is October 1915 and February 1916, and Starr in 1916. John Work Jr.—also known as John Work II—spent three decades at Fisk University, collecting and promulgating the "jubilee songcraft" of the original Fisk Jubilee Singers and in 1901 he co-published New Jubilee Songs as Sung by the Fisk Jubilee Singers with his brother, Frederick J. Work.

From 1890 through 1919, "African Americans made significant contributions to the recording industry in its formative years", with recordings by the Fisk Jubilee Singers and others.

=== Hampton Singers ===
In 1873, the Hampton Singers formed a group in Hampton, Virginia at what is now known as Hampton University. They were the first ensemble to "rival the Jubilee Singers". With Robert Nathaniel Dett (1882–1943) as conductor until 1933, Hampton Singers "earned an international following."

=== Tuskegee Institute Quartet ===
The first formal a cappella Tuskegee Quartet was organized in 1884 by Booker T. Washington, who was also the founder of the Tuskegee Institute. Since 1881, Washington had insisted that everyone attending their weekly religious services should join in singing African American spirituals. The Quartet was formed to "promote the interest of Tuskegee Institute". In 1909 a new quartet was formed. The singers travelled intermittently until the 1940s. Like the Fisk Jubilee Singers, the Tuskegee Institute Singers sang spirituals in a modified harmonized style.

=== The concert spiritual tradition ===
African American composers—Harry Burleigh, R. Nathaniel Dett, and William Dawson, created a "new repertoire for the concert stage" by applying their Western classical education to the spirituals. They brought spirituals to concert settings and mentored the next generation of professional spirituals musicians starting in the early 20th century.

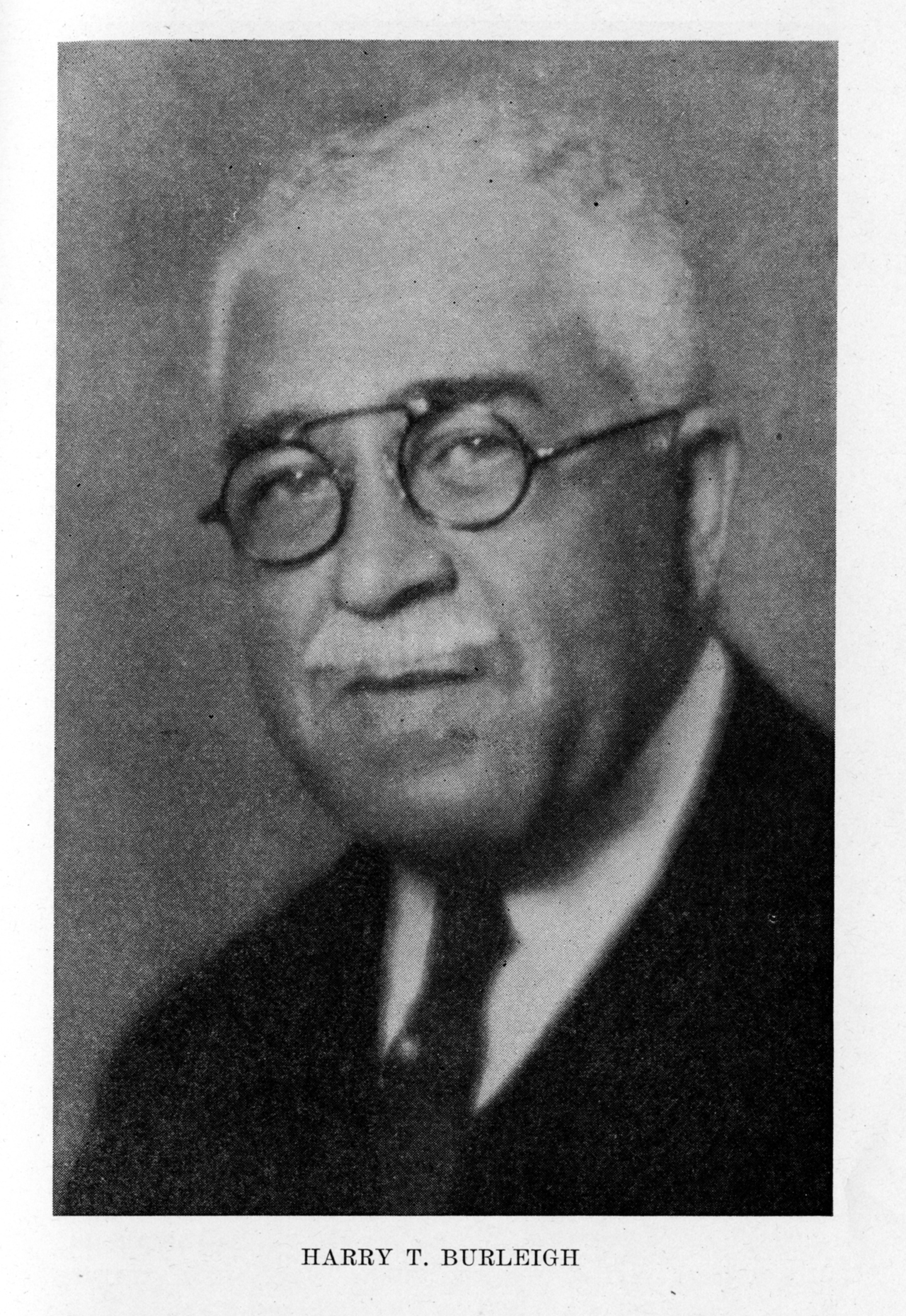
Photograph of Harry T. Burleigh, 1936

Harry Burleigh's (1866–1949)—an African-American classical composer and baritone performed in many concert settings published Jubilee Songs of the United States in 1929, which made "spirituals available to solo concert singers as art songs for the first time". Burleigh arranged spirituals with a classical form. He was also a baritone, who performed in many concert settings. He introduced classically trained artists, such as Antonín Dvořák to African-American spirituals. Some believe that Dvorak was inspired by the spirituals in his Symphony From the New World. He coached African-American soloists, such as Marian Anderson, as solo classical singers. Others, such as Roland Hayes and Paul Robeson continued his legacy.

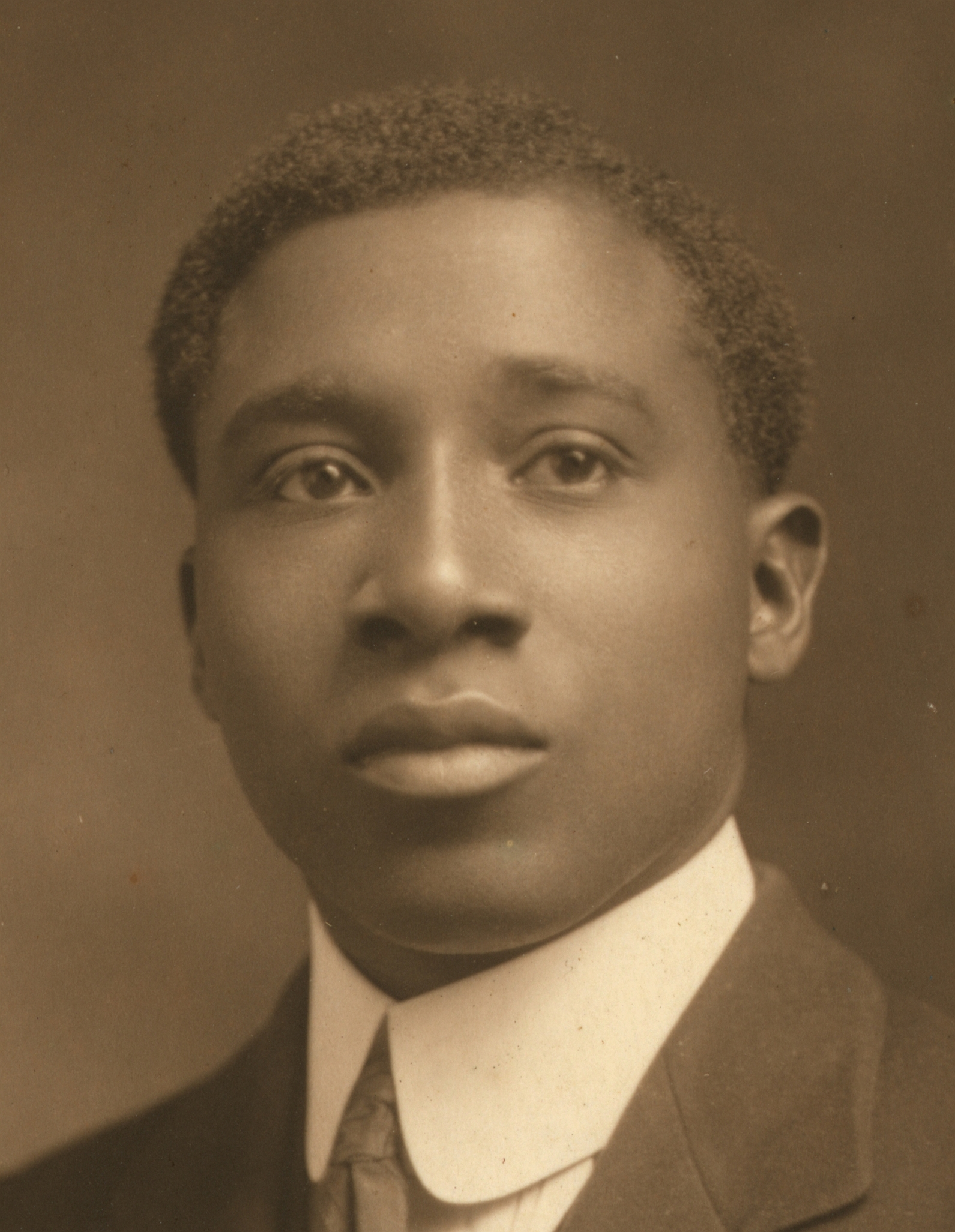
Robert Nathaniel Dett in the 1920s

R. Nathaniel Dett (1882–1943) is known for his arrangements that incorporated the music and spirit of European Romantic composers with African-American spirituals. In 1918, he said, "We have this wonderful store of folk music—the melodies of an enslaved people" but it will be of no value if it is not used. We must treat spirituals "in such manner that it can be presented in choral form, in lyric and operatic works, in concertos and suites and salon music". R. Nathaniel Dett was a mentor to Edward Boatner (1898–1981), an African American composer who wrote many popular concert arrangements of the spirituals. Boatner and Willa A. Townsend published Spirituals triumphant old and new in 1927. Boatner "maintained the importance of authenticity regarding the collection and transcription of spirituals, but also clearly identified with the new, stylized and polished ways in which they were arranged and performed".

William L. Dawson (1876 – 1938), a composer, choir director, music professor, and musicologist, is known, among other accomplishments, for the world premiere by the Philadelphia Orchestra of his 1934 Negro Folk Symphony which was revised with added African rhythms in 1952 following Dawson's trip to West Africa. One of his most popular spirituals is "Ezekiel Saw the Wheel".

== Spirituals in contemporary life ==
The Fisk Jubilee Singers continue to maintain their popularity in the 21st century with live performances in locations such as Grand Ole Opry House in 2019 in Nashville, Tennessee. In 2019 Tazewell Thompson presented an cappella musical entitled Jubilee, which is a tribute to the Fisk Jubilee Singers.

Spirituals remain a mainstay particularly in small black churches, often Baptist or Pentecostal, in the deep South.

The latter half of the 20th century saw a resurgence of the spiritual. This trend was impacted strongly by composers and musical directors such as Moses Hogan and Brazeal Dennard.

Arthur Jones founded "The Spirituals Project" at the University of Denver in 1999 to help keep alive the message and meaning of the songs that had moved from the fields of the South to the concert halls of the North.

Everett McCorvey founded The American Spiritual Ensemble in 1995, a group of about two dozen professional singers who tour performing spirituals in the United States and abroad. The group has produced several CDs, including "The Spirituals", and is the focus of a public broadcasting documentary.

== Stylistic origins and qualities ==
Qualities of the spirituals include mastery of the blending of voices, timing, and intonation.

Spirituals were originally unaccompanied monophonic songs. The tempo in some songs may be slowed down at times—ritardando—as in the case of "sorrow songs" and/or to showcase the "beauty and blending of the voices".

Along with the "solo call and unison response", songs may include "overlapping layers, and spine-tingling falsetto humming."

Stylistic origins include African music, Christian hymns, work songs, field holler,. Historian Jonathan Curiel also noted possible influences from Islamic music. According to a McGraw Hill publication for grade school, "Spirituals were sung as lullabies and play songs. Some spirituals were adapted as work songs.

Black spirituals "use of microtonally flatted notes, syncopation and counter-rhythms marked by handclapping in black spiritual performances." It "stands out for the singers' striking vocal timbre that features shouting, exclamations of the word "Glory!" and raspy and shrill falsetto tones".

Numerous rhythmical and sonic elements of spirituals can be traced to African sources, including prominent use of the pentatonic scale (the black keys on the piano).

In his 1954 book Studies in African Music, Arthur Morris Jones (1889–1980), a missionary and ethnomusicologist, said that in African music, the "complex interweaving of contrasting rhythmic patterns" was central to African music, just as harmonies were valued in European music. Jones described the drum is the highest expression of rhythms, but they can also be produced through hand-clapping, stick-beating, rattles, and the "pounding of pestles in a mortar". (Note: A.M. Jones' (1889–1980) experience was in Zambia during the early 1900s. He was a missionary and musicologist.)

Over time "formal concert tradition has evolved," which included the work of the Hampton Singers under composer R. Nathaniel Dett.

In the 20th century, composers, such as Moses Hogan, Roland Carter, Jester Hairston, Brazeal Dennard and Wendell Whalum transformed the "cappella arrangements of spirituals for choruses" beyond its "traditional folk song roots".

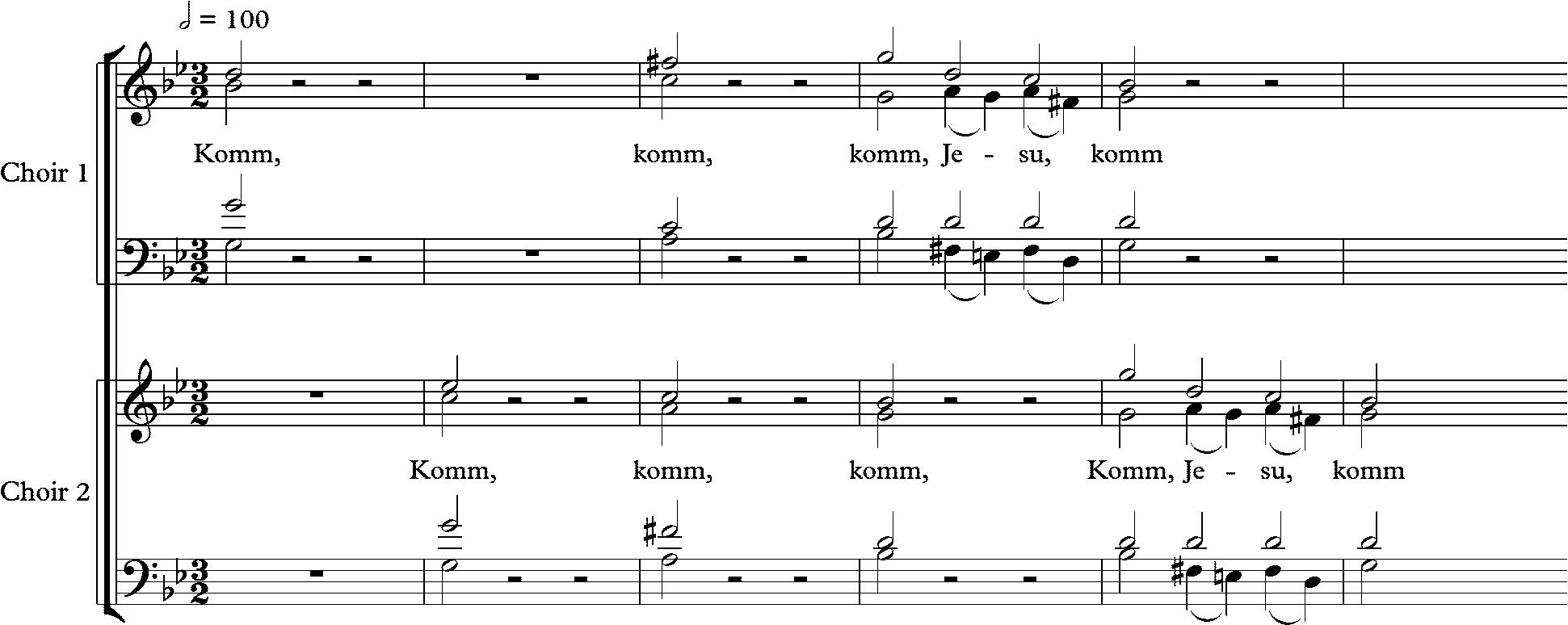

=== Call and response ===
University of Denver professor, Arthur Jones, who established "The Spirituals Project in 1998, out of the university's Lamont School of Music, described how coded words could be introduced in the call and response overlap, which only insiders aware of the encrypted message could understand. He described "already existing spirituals" were employed "clandestinely" as one of the many ways people used in their "multilayered struggle for freedom."

=== Sorrow songs ===
Slave songs were called "Sorrow Songs" by W.E.B. Du Bois in his book, 1903 book, The Souls of Black Folk. Sorrow songs are spirituals, such as, "Sometimes I Feel Like a Motherless Child", and "Nobody Knows the Trouble I've Seen"—songs that are intense and melancholic—are sung at a slower pace.

=== Jubilee songs ===
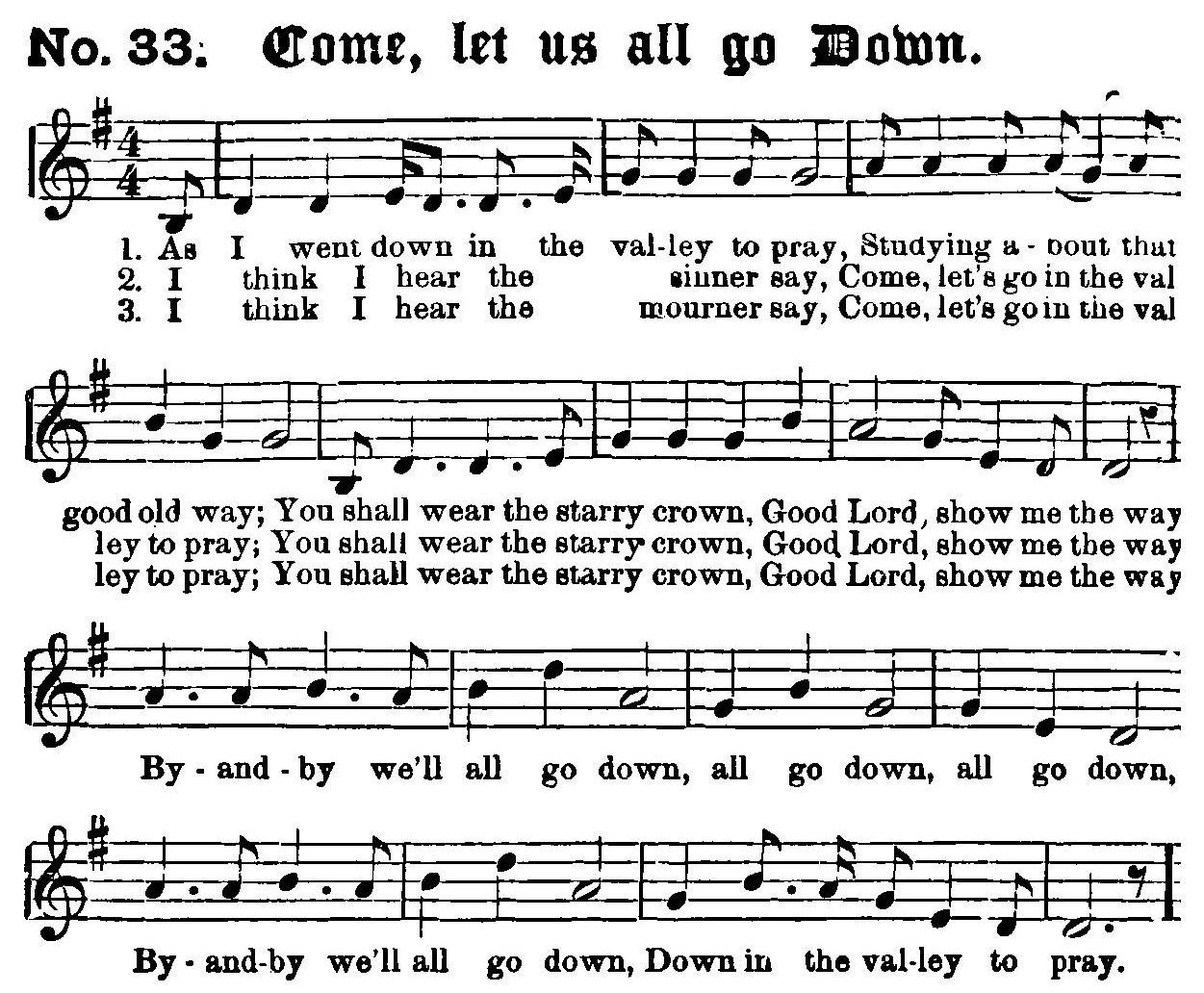

The Fisk Jubilee Singers had been so successful that other groups were created to perform similar music. Over time the term "jubilee" was used to refer to other ensembles who sang the original group's repertoire. In the early 1900s jubilee singers also referred to singers who performed gospel music, and hymns as well as spirituals. Examples of these early nineteenth century groups include the Norfolk Jubilee Quartet, the Utica Jubilee Singers, and the Tuskegee Institute Singers.

Jubilee songs, also known as "camp meeting songs," such as and "Fare Ye Well" and "Rocky my soul in the bosom of Abraham" are fast-paced, "rhythmic and often syncopated". Spiritual songs which looked forward to a time of future happiness, or deliverance from tribulation, were often known as 'jubilees.

In some churches, such as the Pentecostal church in the 1910s and 1920s in New Orleans, there was no organ or choir and music was louder, more exuberant and included up tempo spirituals called "jubilees". They "used the drum, the cymbal, the tambourine, and the steel triangle. Everybody in there sang, and they clapped and stomped their feet, and sang with their whole bodies. They had a beat, a rhythm we held on to from slavery days, and their music was so strong and expressive."

=== Freedom songs ===
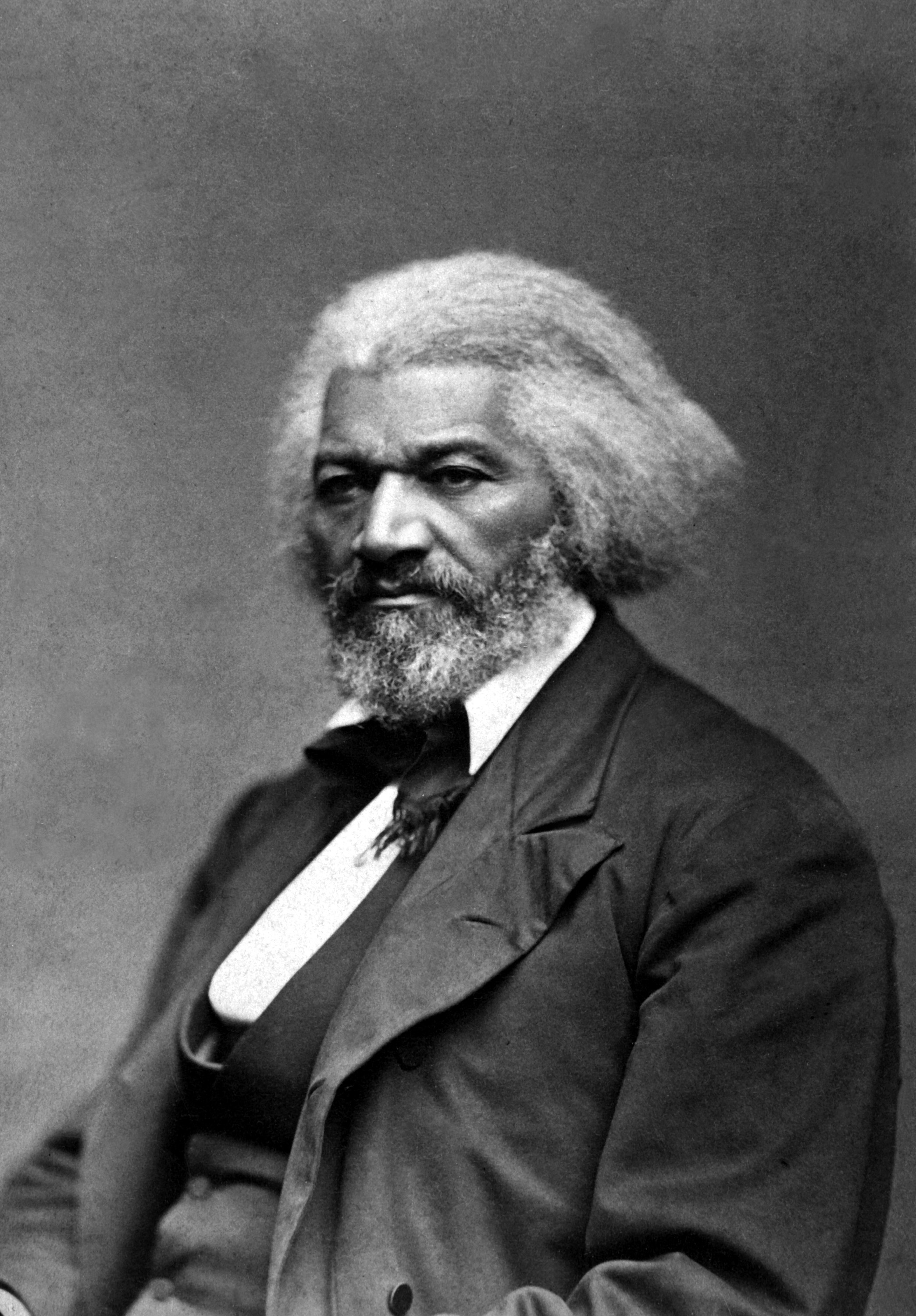
Frederick Douglass

Frederick Douglass, an abolitionist and a former slave said that slave songs awakened him to the dehumanizing character of slavery, "The mere recurrence, even now, afflicts my spirit, and while I am writing these lines, my tears are falling. To those songs I trace my first glimmering conceptions of the dehumanizing character of slavery. I can never get rid of that conception. Those songs still follow me, to deepen my hatred of slavery, and quicken my sympathies for my brethren in bonds.

In a 2017 PBS Newshour, segment entitled "Singing in Slavery: Songs of Survival, Songs of Freedom" said that, while it is "has not been proven, it is believed"—that "Wade in the Water" was one of the songs associated with the Underground Railroad—a network of secret routes and safe houses used by slaves in the United States to find freedom. warn slaves to get off the trail and into the water to prevent bloodhounds—used by the slavers—from following their trail.

Jones described how during the years of the Underground Railroad "already existing spirituals" were employed "clandestinely" as one of the many ways people used in their "multilayered struggle for freedom." He described how coded words could be introduced in the call and response overlap, which only insiders aware of the encrypted message.

A collaborative production by Maryland Public Television, Maryland Historical Society, and Maryland State Archives entitled "Pathways to Freedom: Maryland and the Underground Railroad" had included a section on how songs that many slaves knew had "secret meanings" that they could be "used to signal many things". Certain songs were believed to have contained explicit instructions to fugitive slaves on how to avoid capture and the route to take to successfully make their way to freedom. Other spirituals that some believe have coded messages include "The Gospel Train", "Song of the Free", and "Swing Low, Sweet Chariot", "Follow the Drinking Gourd". James Kelley in his 2008 article said that there is a lack of corroborating sources to prove that there is a coded message in "Follow the Drinking Gourd".

One 1953 article by Sterling Brown said that there are scholars who "believe that when the Negro sang of freedom, he meant only what the whites meant, namely freedom from sin." Brown said that, to an enslaved person freedom would also mean freedom from slavery. When the enslaved person sings, "I been rebuked, I been scorned; done had a hard time sho's you bawn," he is not only referring to freedom from sin but from physical bondage. Brown cited Douglass, saying that Canaan stood for Canada; and "over and beyond hidden satire the songs also were grapevines for communications. Harriet Tubman, herself called the Moses of her people, has told us that "Go Down Moses" was tabu in the slave states, but the people sang it nonetheless."

A 2016 Library of Congress article said that Freedom songs and protest songs, such as, Bob Marley's "Redemption Song" and Billy Bragg's "Sing their souls back home'" were based on African American spirituals, and that became the musical backdrop of the call for democracy around the globe. Many of the freedom songs, such as "Oh, Freedom!" and "Eyes on the Prize," that defined the Civil rights movement (1954–1968) were adapted from some of the early African American spirituals. Some such as, "We Shall Overcome," combined the gospel hymn "I'll Overcome Someday" with the spiritual "I'll Be all right."

=== Work songs ===
In the 1927 anthology, The American Songbag, compiled by Carl Sandburg (1878–1967), the American poet and folklorist, he wrote that "Ain' Go'n' to Study War No Mo'" was an example of a spiritual that African Americans used as work songs. He said, that, "As the singers go on, hour by hour, they bring in lines from many other spirituals. The tempo is vital. Never actually monotonous. Never ecstatic, yet steady in its onflow, sure of its pulses. It is a work song-spiritual. War is pronounced "wah" or "waw" as if to rhyme with "saw." Horse is "hawss." And so on with Negro economy of vocables in speech and song."

=== Field hollers ===
Field holler music, also known as levee camp holler music, was an early form of African American music, described in the 19th century. Field hollers laid the foundations for the blues, spirituals, and eventually rhythm and blues. Field hollers, cries and hollers of the enslaved people and later sharecroppers working in cotton fields, prison chain gangs, railway gangs (gandy dancers) or turpentine camps were the precursor to the call and response of African American spirituals and gospel music, to jug bands, minstrel shows, stride piano, and ultimately to the blues, rhythm and blues, jazz and African American music in general.

== Derivatives ==
Blues and gospel music are derivatives of African American spirituals.

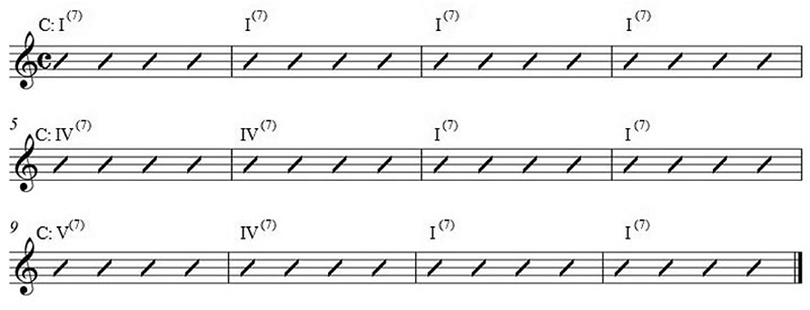

=== The blues ===
In the early 1960s, Blues People by Amiri Baraka—the chosen name for LeRoi Jones (1934–2014)—provided a history of African Americans through their music, beginning with the spirituals to the blues. By 1967, Jones had become the main spokesperson for African American intellectuals, displacing James Baldwin, according to a 1965 review of Blues People.

The blues form originated in the 1860s in the Deep South—South Carolina, Mississippi, Florida, Alabama, Georgia, Louisiana, Tennessee, and Texas—states that were most dependent on the slave labor on plantations and that held the largest number of enslaved people. The form was collectively developed by generations and communities of enslaved African Americans starting as "unaccompanied work-songs of the plantation culture". The historical roots of the blues have been traced farther back to West African sources by scholars such as Paul Oliver and Gerhard Kubik—with elements such as the "responsorial 'leader-and-chorus' form". The blues became the "most extensively recorded of all traditional music types" and since the "early 1960s,—the "most important single influence on the development of Western popular music," and are now widespread. (Note: According to Paul Oliver in The New Grove Dictionary of Music and Musicians, "From obscure and largely undocumented rural American origins...Influential in its development were the collective unaccompanied work-songs of the plantation culture, which followed a responsorial 'leader-and-chorus' form that can be traced not only to pre-Civil War origins but to African sources. Responsorial work-songs diminished when the plantations were broken up, but persisted in the southern penitentiary farms until the 1950s. After the Reconstruction era, black workers either engaged in seasonal collective labour in the South or tended smallholdings leased to them under the system of debt-serfdom known as sharecropping. Work-songs therefore increasingly took the form of solo calls or 'hollers', comparatively free in form but close to blues in feeling. The vocal style of the blues probably derived from the holler... Blues instrumental style shows tenuous links with African music. Drumming was forbidden on slave plantations, but the playing of string instruments was often permitted and even encouraged, so the musicians among slaves from the savanna regions, with their strong traditions of string playing, predominated. The jelli, or griots—professional musicians who also acted as their tribe’s historians and social commentators—performed roles not unlike those of the later blues singers, while the banjo is thought to be a direct descendant of their banza or xalam. One musical influence that can be traced back to African sources is that of the plantation work songs with their call-and-response format, and more especially the relatively free-form field hollers of the later sharecroppers, which seem to have been directly responsible for the characteristic vocal style of the blues.")

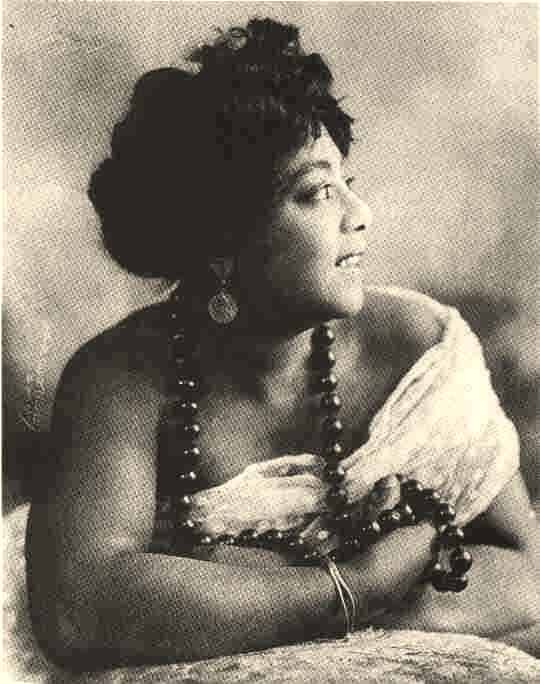
Mamie Smith

When Mamie Smith's August 10, 1920, Okeh recording of the composer Perry Bradford's (1893–1970) New York City Crazy Blues became a commercial success, it opened the commercial record market for music for an African American audience. Prior to the success of this recording, commercial recording companies featured non-African American musicians playing African-American music. Bradford's African-American band, the Jazz Hounds, "played live, improvised", "unpredictable", "breakneck" music that was a "refreshing contrast to the buttoned-up versions of the blues interpreted by white artists across the 1910s".

A 1976 book, Stomping the Blues by Albert Murray, said that this interaction between Christianity and African-American spirituals occurred only in the United States. Africans who converted to Christianity in other parts of the world, even in the Caribbean and Latin America, did not evolve this particular form.

=== Gospel songs ===
Sacred music includes both spirituals and gospel music, which "originated in the black church and has become a globally recognized genre of popular music. In its earliest manifestations, gospel music functioned as an integral religious and ceremonial practice during worship services. Now, gospel music is also marketed commercially and draws on contemporary, secular sounds while still conveying spiritual and religious ideas."

Well-known gospel singer Mahalia Jackson (1911–1972) was one of Gospel music's most prominent defenders. She said that, "Blues are the songs of despair. Gospel songs are the songs of hope. When you sing gospel you have a feeling there is a cure for what's wrong. When you're through with the blues you've got nothing to rest on." Horace Clarence Boyer traced the emergence of Gospel music as a "discrete musical style" to the Deep South in 1906 in Pentecostal churches. Through the Great Migration of African American from the south to the north, especially in the 1930s, gospel songs entered the "mainstream of American popular culture". Gospel music had its heyday from 1945 to 1955—the "Golden Age of Gospel."

Gospel Quartets, like the Golden Jubilee Quartet and the Golden Gate Quartet, changed the style of spirituals with their innovative, jubilee style which included new harmonies, syncopation with sophisticated arrangements. An example of their music was their performance of "Oh, Jonah!" The Golden Gate Quartet—who were active from 1934 to the late 1940s—performed in the concert From Spirituals to Swing at Carnegie Hall in the late 1930s. Zora Neale Hurston, in her 1938 book The Sanctified Church, criticized what she called "Glee Club style" of the Fisk Jubilee Singers, Tuskegee Institute Quartet, and Hampton Singers in the 1930s. She said they were using a style" that was "full of musicians' tricks" that were not authentic to their roots in the original African American spirituals. The authentic spirituals could only be found in the "unfashionable Negro church".

=== White spirituals ===
In his 1938 book, White Spirituals in the Southern Uplands, Vanderbilt University's George Pullen Jackson in Nashville drew attention to the existence of a white spiritual genre which differed in many aspects from African American spirituals. The core of Jackson's argument, however, supported by many musical examples, is that African-American spirituals draw heavily on textual and melodic elements found in white hymns and spiritual songs. Jackson extended the term "spirituals" to a wider range of folk hymnody but this does not appear to have been widespread usage previously. The term, however, has often been broadened to include subsequent arrangements into more standard European-American hymnodic styles, and to include post-emancipation songs with stylistic similarities to the original African American spirituals.

== Possible Islamic influences ==
The historian Sylviane Diouf and ethnomusicologist Gerhard Kubik identify Islamic music as an influence. Diouf notes a resemblance between the Islamic call to prayer (originating from Bilal ibn Rabah, a famous Abyssinian African Muslim in the early 7th century) and 19th-century field holler music, noting that both have similar lyrics praising God, melody, note changes, "words that seem to quiver and shake" in the vocal chords, dramatic changes in musical scales, and nasal intonation. She attributes the origins of field holler music to African Muslim slaves who accounted for an estimated 30% of African slaves in America. According to Kubik, "the vocal style of many blues singers using melisma, wavy intonation, and so forth is a heritage of that large region of West Africa that had been in contact with the Arabic-Islamic world of the Maghreb since the seventh and eighth centuries." There was particularly a significant trans-Saharan cross-fertilization between the musical traditions of the Maghreb and the Sahel.

There was a difference in the music performed by the predominantly Muslim Sahelian slaves and the predominantly non-Muslim slaves from coastal West Africa and Central Africa. The Sahelian Muslim slaves generally favored wind and string instruments and solo singing, whereas the non-Muslim slaves generally favored drums and group chants. Plantation owners who feared revolt outlawed drums and group chants, but allowed the Sahelian slaves to continue singing and playing their wind and string instruments, which the plantation owners found less threatening. According to Curiel stringed instruments these string instruments may have the precursor to the banjo. While many were pressured to convert to Christianity, the Sahelian slaves were allowed to maintain their musical traditions, adapting their skills to instruments such as the fiddle and guitar. Some were also allowed to perform at balls for slave-holders, allowing the migration of their music across the Deep South.

== See also ==
- African-American music
- Deep River Boys
- Gospel music
- History of slavery in the United States
- Original Nashville Students
- Religious music
- Songs of the Underground Railroad

=== Notable songs ===
These notable spirituals were written or widely adopted by African Americans:

- All God's Chillun Got Wings
- Bosom of Abraham
- Children, Go Where I Send Thee
- Deep River
- Dem Bones
- Didn't It Rain
- Do Lord Remember Me
- Down by the Riverside
- Down in the River to Pray
- Every Time I Feel the Spirit
- Ezekiel Saw the Wheel
- Follow the Drinkin' Gourd
- Go Down Moses
- Go Tell It on the Mountain
- Golden Slippers
- Gospel Plow
- The Gospel Train
- He's Got the Whole World in His Hands
- I Shall Not Be Moved
- I'm So Glad
- Joshua Fit the Battle of Jericho
- Kumbaya
- Lord, I Want to Be a Christian
- Michael Row the Boat Ashore
- Nobody Knows the Trouble I've Seen
- Roll, Jordan, Roll
- Satan, Your Kingdom Must Come Down
- Sometimes I Feel Like a Motherless Child
- Song of the Free
- Steal Away
- Swing Low, Sweet Chariot
- There Is a Balm in Gilead
- This Little Light of Mine
- Wade in the Water
- We Are Climbing Jacob's Ladder
- Were You There
- We Shall Overcome
- When the Chariot Comes
- When the Saints Go Marching In
