= 101 Gang Songs =

Studio album by Bing Crosby
- Released: 1961
- Recorded: December 20–28, 1960
- Genre: Vocal
- Length: 1:21:52
- Label: Warner Bros.
- Producer: Simon Rady

Bing Crosby chronology
Songs of Christmas (1960)	101 Gang Songs (1961)	El Señor Bing (1961)

101 Gang Songs is the twenty-seventh solo studio album by American singer and actor Bing Crosby, recorded in December 1960 for his own company, Project Records, and distributed by Warner Bros. (W 2R-1401) and the RCA Victor Record Club in 1961 with lyric sheets to help the listener join in with the singing. Spread over two records, the album consists of 24 medleys of 101 old songs (hence the album's title) in a sing-along format. ("Gang" is meant in the sense of a group of friends, not a street gang or work gang.) Crosby sings on most of the tracks. Those that are not are marked with an asterisk. The chorus and orchestra accompaniment, arranged and conducted by Jack Halloran, was pre-recorded with Crosby over-dubbing his vocals.

This original double LP was released as two separate albums under the titles Join Bing in a Gang Song Sing Along in September 1961 and Join Bing and Sing Along-51 Good Time Songs in January 1962.

The albums were released on CD in 2017 by Sepia Records.

Selected tracks from the albums and from the earlier Join Bing and Sing Along record later were re-dubbed over a children's chorus, arranged and conducted by Halloran, which was recorded on May 17–19, 1961. It was issued later to children's camps as Sing Along with Bing.

== Reception ==
Variety reviewed the album by writing "Bing Crosby is slowly moving into Mitch Miller's territory. Crosby's first sing along package did quite well in the market and this compilation of 50 faves has a good chance to do even better. The formula is light and simple and with Crosby leading the way the sing-along is easy to follow."

High Fidelity Magazine wrote "Mitch Miller may have started (or at least resurrected) the 'sing-along' craze, but it has taken the Old Master to supply the definitive triumph of this genre. He's in his jauntiest form here, leading a usually robust chorus, backed by a vigorously steady rhythm section in performances which imperiously demand participation."

== Track listing ==
Part One – Side One
No.	Title	Writer(s)	Length
1.	"Shine On, Harvest Moon" "That's Where My Money Goes" "Harrigan" "Listen to the Mocking Bird"	Nora Bayes, Jack Norworth; R.P. Lilly, Walter Daniels; George M. Cohan; Alice Hawthorne, Richard Milburn	3:36
2.	"Flow Gently, Sweet Afton" "Believe Me, if All Those Endearing Young Charms" "Drink to Me Only with Thine Eyes"	Robert Burns, Jonathan E. Spilman; Thomas Moore; Ben Jonson	3:45
3.	"Sweet Rosie O'Grady" "My Sweetheart's the Man in the Moon" "Forty-Five Minutes from Broadway" "Goodbye, My Lover, Goodbye*"	Maude Nugent; James Thornton; George M. Cohan; T. H. Allen	2:56
4.	"When the Saints Go Marching In" "Little David, Play on Your Harp "Joshua Fit the Battle of Jericho" "Hand Me Down My Walking Cane" "Ezekiel Saw the Wheel"	Katharine Purvis, James Milton Black; Traditional; Traditional; James A. Bland; Traditional	3:12
5.	"While Strolling Through the Park One Day" "Today Is Monday" "Big Rock Candy Mountain" "Oh Dear! What Can the Matter Be?" "Oh Where, Oh Where Has My Little Dog Gone?"	Ed Haley; Traditional; Harry McClintock; Traditional; Septimus Winner	3:31
6.	"Annie Laurie" "Loch Lomond" "Bluebells of Scotland" "Comin' Thro' the Rye"	William Douglas; Traditional; Dora Jordan; Robert Burns	3:01
Total length:			20:01

Part One – Side Two
No.	Title	Writer(s)	Length
1.	"Hello! Ma Baby" "The Girl I Left Behind Me" "(Won't You Come Home) Bill Bailey" "Wait for the Wagon" "Row, Row, Row Your Boat*"	Joseph E. Howard, Ida Emerson; Traditional; Hughie Cannon; Traditional; Traditional	3:19
2.	"Sweet Adeline" "On Top of Old Smoky" "Down in the Valley" "In the Good Old Summer Time*"	Richard H. Gerard, Harry Armstrong; Traditional; Traditional; George Evans, Ren Shields	3:36
3.	"This Old Man" "Schnitzelbank" "Pop Goes the Weasel" "Careless Love"	Traditional; Traditional; Traditional; Traditional	3:11
4.	"Li'l Liza Jane" "Cindy" "Where Did You Get That Hat?" "So Long Mary" "Three Blind Mice"	Traditional; Traditional; Joseph J. Sullivan; George M. Cohan; Traditional	3:22
5.	"Anchors Aweigh" "Tramp! Tramp! Tramp!" "Blow the Man Down" "For He's a Jolly Good Fellow"	Charles A. Zimmermann, Alfred Hart Miles; George F. Root; Traditional; Traditional	2:46
6.	"Love's Old Sweet Song" "Kathleen Mavourneen*" "Juanita"	James Lynam Molloy, G. Clifton Bingham; Frederick Crouch, Marion Crawford; Caroline Norton	3:51
Total length:			20:05

Part Two – Side One
No.	Title	Writer(s)	Length
1.	"My Wild Irish Rose" "Come Back to Erin" "Killarney" "The Minstrel Boy"	Chauncey Olcott; Claribel; Michael William Balfe, Edmund Falconer; Thomas Moore	3:42
2.	"In the Gloaming" "Stars of the Summer Night"* "Come Where My Love Lies Dreaming"	Annie Fortescue Harrison, Meta Orred; Isaac B. Woodbury; Stephen Foster	3:35
3.	"Little Annie Rooney" "Du, du liegst mir im Herzen" "Ach Du Lieber Augustine" "Lovely Evening" "Goodnight to You All"	Michael Nolan; Theobald Boehm; Marx Augustin; Traditional; Traditional	3:25
4.	"She'll Be Coming 'Round the Mountain" "Our Boys Will Shine Tonight" "The Gospel Train" "Walk Together Children" "The Nut-Brown Maid"	Traditional; Traditional; Traditional; Traditional; Traditional	3:23
5.	"Casey Jones" "Polly Wolly Doodle" "The Man Who Broke the Bank at Monte Carlo" "I've Been Working on the Railroad" "Asleep in the Deep"	Eddie Newton, Wallace Saunders, T. Lawrence Seibert; Traditional; Fred Gilbert; Traditional; Arthur J. Lamb, Henry W. Petrie	3:55
6.	"The Battle Hymn of the Republic" "America" (chorus only) "When Johnny Comes Marching Home" "America the Beautiful"	William Steffe, Julia Ward Howe; Samuel Francis Smith; Louis Lambert; Katharine Lee Bates, Samuel A. Ward	3:16
Total length:			21:16

Part Two – Side Two
No.	Title	Writer(s)	Length
1.	"There Is a Tavern in the Town" "Oh! Susanna" "Maryland, My Maryland" "Carry Me Back to Old Virginny" "The Bear Went Over the Mountain"	Traditional; Stephen Foster; James Ryder Randall; James A. Bland; Traditional	3:12
2.	"Gumtree Canoe" "Dear Evelina" "Sweet and Low* (chorus only)"	A.F. Winnemore, S.S. Steele; Traditional; Joseph Barnby, Alfred, Lord Tennyson	3:13
3.	"My Gal Sal" "I Don't Want to Play in Your Yard" "School Days"* "Abdul Abulbul Amir"	Paul Dresser; Henry W. Petrie, Philip Wingate; Will Cobb, Gus Edwards; Percy French	3:25
4.	"Heaven, Heaven" "Mary, Don't You Weep" "Jacob's Ladder"* "Nobody Knows the Trouble I've Seen" "Roll, Jordan, Roll"	Traditional; Traditional; Traditional; Traditional; Charles Wesley	3:24
5.	"O Sole Mio" "Funiculì, Funiculà" "My Grandfather's Clock" ""Keemo Kimo"	Giovanni Capurro, Eduardo di Capua; Luigi Denza, Edward Oxenford; Henry Clay Work; Traditional	3:43
6.	"Sweet Genevieve" "Santa Lucia" "In the Evening by the Moonlight" "Goodnight, Ladies"	Henry Tucker; Teodoro Cottrau; James A. Bland; Edwin Pearce Christy	3:33
Total length:			20:30

*Non-Bing – orchestra and chorus only
