= The Gospel Train =

Negro spiritual

"The Gospel Train (Get on Board)"
- The Jubilee Singers (1873)

Song by Fisk Jubilee Singers (earliest attested)
- Published: 1872
- Genre: Negro spiritual
- Songwriter: Unknown

"The Gospel Train"
"The Gospel Train" published by the Fisk Jubilee Singers in 1872 and performed by the United States Navy Band's Sea Chanters ensemble

"The Gospel Train (Get on Board)" is a traditional African-American spiritual first published in 1872 as one of the songs of the Fisk Jubilee Singers. A standard Gospel song, it is found in the hymnals of many Protestant denominations and has been recorded by numerous artists.

The first verse, including the chorus is as follows:

The gospel train is coming
I hear it just at hand
I hear the car wheels moving
And rumbling thro' the land
Get on board, children (3×)
For there's room for many a more

Although "The Gospel Train" is usually cited as traditional, several sources credit a Baptist minister from New Hampshire, John Chamberlain, with writing it. Captain Asa W. Bartlett, historian for the New Hampshire Twelfth Regiment, reported Chamberlain as singing the song on April 26, 1863, during Sunday services for the regiment.

== History ==
"The Gospel Railroad" (1867).

The source for the melody and lyrics is unknown but developed out of a tradition which resulted in a number of similar songs about a "Gospel Train". One of the earliest known is not from the United States, but from Scotland. In 1853, Scotsman John Lyon published a song in Liverpool titled "Be in Time", the last verse of which mentions that the Gospel train is at hand. Lyon's book was written to raise funds for the Mormon emigration of the 1840s and 50s. In 1857, an editor for Knickerbocker magazine wrote about visiting a "Colored Camp-Meeting" in New York where a song called "The Warning" was sung which featured an almost identical last verse. "The Warning" used the melody from an old dance song about captain William Kidd.

In 1948, the American born (British by marriage) jazz vocalist Adelaide Hall appeared in a British movie filmed in London called A World is Turning, intended to highlight the contribution of black men and women to British society at a time when they were struggling for visibility on our screens. Filming appears to have been halted due to the director's illness and only six reels of rushes remain, including scenes of Hall rehearsing songs such as "The Gospel Train" and "Swing Low, Sweet Chariot".

Bing Crosby included the song in a medley on his album 101 Gang Songs (1961).

=== "Be in Time" ===
The last verse from "Be in Time" is:

Now the Gospel train's at hand, be in time, be in time
Now the Gospel train's at hand, be in time
Crowds at the station stand, with passport in their hand
To start for Zion's land, be in time, be in time
To start for Zion's land

=== "The Warning" ===
The last verse of "The Warning" is:

The Gospel train's at hand
Be in time, be in time!
The Gospel train's at hand
Be in time
Behold your station there
JESUS has paid your fare
Let's all engage in prayer
Be in time, be in time!
Let's all engage in prayer
Be in time!

=== "The Gospel Railroad" ===
"The Gospel Railroad" is another one of the early "Gospel Train" songs from Britain. Written sometime before 1867, its last verse is:

Come, sinner! join the Gospel-train
Would you the Holy City gain
That you the journey may begin—
The train is waiting—O step in!

== See also ==
- List of train songs
- People Get Ready

== Bibliography ==
- Bartlett, A.W., Capt. History of the Twelfth Regiment, New Hampshire Volunteers in the War of the Rebellion. Concord, NH: Ira C. Evans, Printer (1897).
- Carter, N.F., Rev. The Native Ministry of New Hampshire: The Harvesting of More Than Thirty Three Years. Concord, NH: Rumford Printing Co. (1906).
- Editors. The Knickerbocker, Vol. L November, 1857 No. 6., from The Knickerbocker: Or, New-York Monthly Magazine, Samuel Hueston, 1857.
- "Gospel Railroad, The" pp 360-361, The Christian Sentinel: or Soldiers' Magazine. London: Army Scripture Readers' and Soldiers' Friend Society. No. 131 (November 1, 1867) (Reprinted from Our Children's Magazine, E.J.H).
- Lyon, John. The Harp of Zion, A Collection of Poems &c. Liverpool: J. Sadler, 1853.
- Pike, G.D. The Jubilee Singers and Their Campaign for Twenty Thousand Dollars, Lee And Shepard, Publishers, 1873.
- Waltz, Robert B; David G. Engle. "Get On Board, Little Children". The Traditional Ballad Index: An Annotated Bibliography of the Folk Songs of the English-Speaking World. Hosted by California State University, Fresno, Folklore, 2007.
