= Roland Carter (composer) =

African-American choral composer and conductor

- Born: May 4, 1942 (age 84)
- Occupation: Conductor

Academic background
- Education: Hampton University; New York University

Academic work
- Discipline: Music
- Institutions: Hampton University; University of Tennessee at Chattanooga

Roland Marvin Carter (born May 4, 1942) is an American composer and conductor, largely of choral music. A native of Chattanooga, Tennessee, Carter studied music education at Hampton University, from which he received a BA, and New York University, from which he received his MA; he studied piano, choral music, and composition. From 1965 until 1989 he taught music at Hampton University, chairing the department of music and leading the choir. In 1989 he moved to the University of Tennessee, Chattanooga, where he directed the choir and continued to teach until his 2013 retirement.

Carter is best known for his work as composer, conductor, arranger, and publisher to promote the choral music of African-American composers. He served as president of the National Association of Negro Musicians from 2003 until 2009, and publishes choral music, especially arrangements of spirituals, through his publishing company MAR-VEL; as a composer, he has created numerous spiritual arrangements himself, as well as composing new choral compositions on a variety of texts. At Carnegie Hall he conducted the first concert in the African-American Music Series. Much of his output has been recorded. As a conductor, Carter has said that he believes in performing spiritual arrangements much as he would the work of Johannes Brahms or Franz Schubert, rather than bringing a more folk-based sensibility to them.

Carter has received numerous awards throughout his career, including an honorary doctorate from Shaw University and an honorary membership in Phi Mu Alpha Sinfonia, granted in 2006. In 2022 the city of Chattanooga named a street for him.

Carter donated his archive to the University of Tennessee at Chattanooga in 2021.
