= Nobody Knows the Trouble I've Seen =

African-American spiritual song

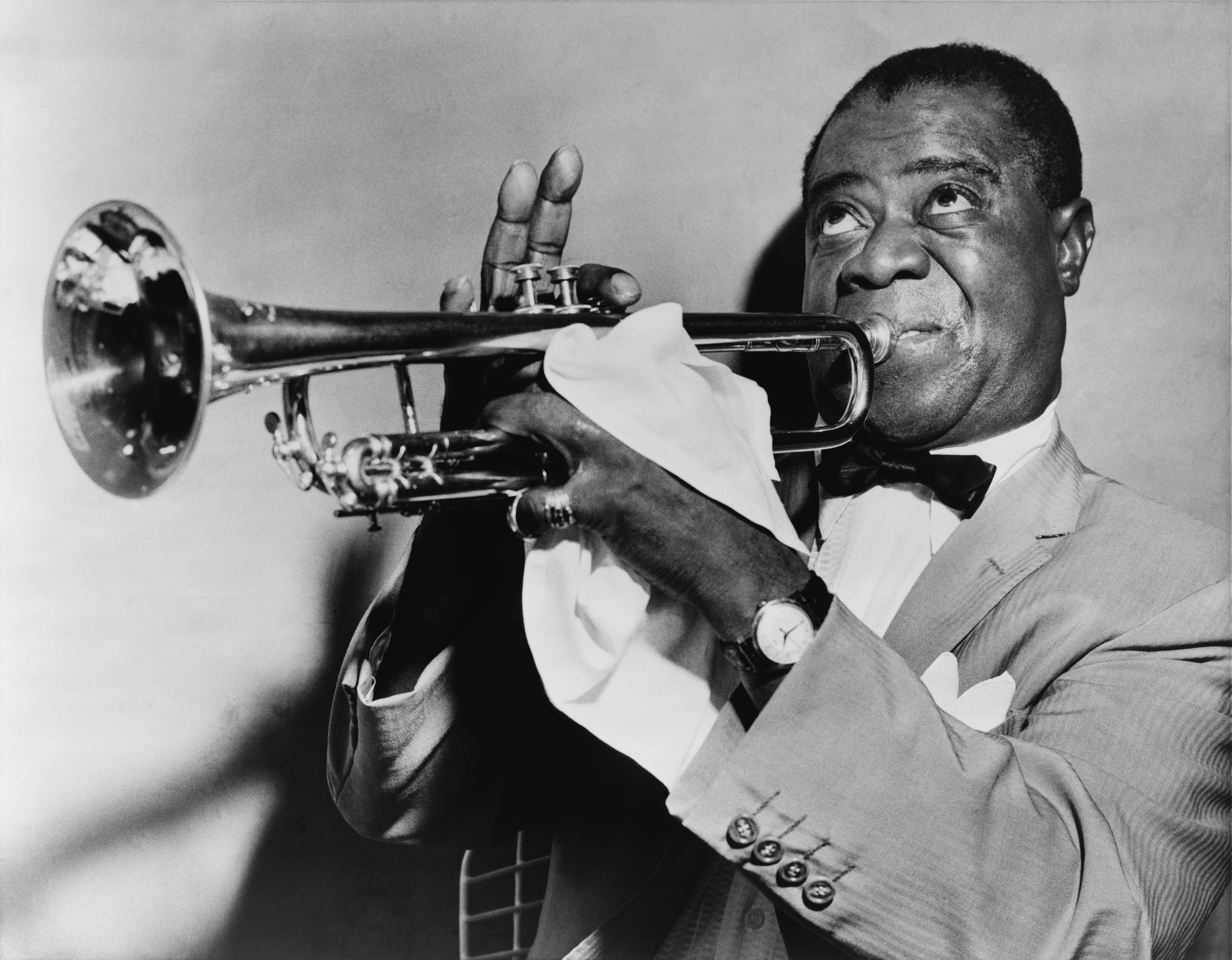
Louis Armstrong recorded his own cover of this song

"Nobody Knows the Trouble I've Seen" is an African-American spiritual song that originated during the period of slavery but was not published until 1866. The song is well known and many cover versions of it have been recorded by artists such as Mahalia Jackson, Louis Armstrong, Lena Horne, Marian Anderson, Harry James, Paul Robeson, and Sam Cooke among others.

== Traditional lyrics ==
Nobody knows the trouble I've been seen
Nobody knows my sorrow
Nobody knows the trouble I've seen
Glory hallelujah!

Sometimes I'm up, sometimes I'm down
Oh, yes, Lord
Sometimes I'm almost to the ground
Oh, yes, Lord

Although you see me going 'long so
Oh, yes, Lord
I have my trials here below
Oh, yes, Lord

Nobody knows the trouble I've been through
Nobody knows but Jesus
Nobody knows the trouble I've seen
Glory hallelujah!

If you get there before I do
Oh, yes, Lord
Tell all-a my friends I'm coming to Heaven!
Oh, yes, Lord

== Variations ==
- The song was published as "Nobody Knows" with seven verses in April 1866 in The Child at Home by the American Tract Society, Boston. It was described as "a specimen of the hymns sung by the freedmen of the South. The hymn was sent to us by one of the teachers who has been for some time engaged at Charleston, S. C., in instructing these poor people." The chorus reads "Nobody knows de trubble I see, Nobody knows but Jesus; Nobody knows de trubble I see, Sing, Glory, Halleloo!"
- The song was reportedly sung in a school near Beaufort, South Carolina, in May 1866, as reported in the The Pennsylvania Freedmen's Bulletin, with text "Nobody knows de trubble I seen, (x3) Nobody knows but Jesus."
- The song appeared as "Nobody Knows The Trouble I've Had" in 1867 in Slave Songs of the United States with four verses. Arranger Hugo Frey used this version in his 1924 collection Famous Negro Spirituals published by Robbins Music.
- The Jubilee Singers sang a song with a similar chorus but with different tune and lyrics, entitled "Nobody Knows the Trouble I See, Lord", first published in 1872.
- The second line ("Nobody knows my sorrow") is rendered in the earliest known versions as "Nobody knows but Jesus"; it is found as such most often in American church hymnals.

== Notable variations and recordings ==
In the late 19th century African-American music began to appear in classical music art forms, in arrangements made by Black composers such as Samuel Coleridge-Taylor, Henry Thacker Burleigh and J. Rosamond Johnson. Johnson made an arrangement of "Nobody Knows the Trouble I See" for voice and piano in 1917, when he was directing the New York Music School Settlement for Colored People.

The song was released on the extended play Negro Spirituals Vol. 1 (His Master's Voice 7EGN 27), and the song was arranged by Harry Douglas.

American contralto Marian Anderson had her first successful recording with a version of the song on the Victor label in 1925.

Singer Lena Horne recorded a version of the song in 1946.

Florence Price incorporates "Nobody Knows the Trouble I've Seen" in her Mississippi River Suite of 1934. The second section especially quotes directly from the spiritual; and it dominates the texture of the fourth section.

American violinist Maud Powell was the first white solo concert artist to perform classical arrangements of spirituals in concerts, and that is where she also interpreted classical and contemporary pieces by composers like Dvorak and Sibelius. After Powell's suggestion, J. R. Johnson made an arrangement of "Nobody Knows the Trouble I See" for piano and violin in 1919. Powell got to play this in a fall program she organized, and then she died that November. Recent interpretations of the classical version of this spiritual have been made by a Chicago violinist, Rachel Barton Pine, who has been working along the lines of Powell's legacy.

The Deep River Boys recorded their version in Oslo on August 29, 1958.

Bing Crosby included the song in a medley on his album 101 Gang Songs (1961).

Georgia Lee (singer), the first Indigenous Australian artist to record blues songs with her album, Georgia Lee Sings the Blues Down Under (1962), features the song.

Dr. John covered the song on his album Ske-Dat-De-Dat: The Spirit of Satch (2014).

== In popular culture ==
- This song is sung by Dick Foran and Peggy Ryan in Private Buckaroo 1942, war musical.
- The song is one of the five spirituals included in the oratorio A Child of Our Time, first performed in 1944, by the classical composer Michael Tippett.
- The song is sung by an offscreen chorus in the 1944 race film Go Down, Death!.
- An African American soldier during the second episode of Roberto Rossellini's Paisan (1946) sings this song to a little Italian boy.
- In the movie Young Man with a Horn (1950), the song is played at the memorial service for the character Art Hazzard.
- The first Indigenous Australian artist to record blues songs with her album, Georgia Lee (singer) Sings the Blues Down Under (1962), sang "Nobody Knows the Trouble I've Seen".
- In his Jazz album of 1978, Ry Cooder added the couplet "Nobody knows the trouble I see, Nobody knows but me" based on the song, as an opening to his version of Nobody, originally composed and sung by Bert Williams.
- The song is sung by Lieutenant Carl Proctor in the 1987 movie Police Academy 4: Citizens on Patrol.
- In the 1987 film Spaceballs, Princess Vespa sings the chorus of the song while in prison.
- A 1988 issue of Boys Life had a comic strip about a Boy Scout called Pee Wee Harris. In it, the Scouts are doing a community project for Eagle Scout in which they are cleaning up an old jailhouse in order for it to be converted into a museum. The title character, Pee Wee Harris, thanks the other Scouts for their hard work and says he can finish up. However, as he is about to quit one of the cells shuts on him. The final panel shows nighttime on the old jailhouse, and "Nobody knows the trouble I've seen" being sung from one window.
- In the Wee Sing video "Wee Sing in the Big Rock Candy Mountains" (1991), the song is sung by Little Bunny Foo Foo to express his sorrow after he is turned into a goon. He sings a verse of the song again in "Wee Singdom: The Land of Music and Fun " (1996) when he temporarily forgets the next part of his performance.
- In the episode of The Muppet Show featuring John Denver, Denver responds to some mushroom-shaped Muppets by singing "Nobody knows the truffles I've seen!"
- In the 1994 movie The Lion King, Zazu sings the first two lines of the song while imprisoned in Scar’s cave.
- Rich Hall's BBC Four documentary Rich Hall's the Dirty South (2010) features the song sung by The Dixie Hummingbirds.
- In a 2011 episode of The Big Bang Theory (Season 4, Episode 12. The Bus Pants Utilization) Sheldon Cooper chooses this song to practice on a theremin as he sings along, expressing his dejection.
- A rendition of the song by Pastor T.L. Barrett & the Youth For Christ Choir is played at the end of episode two of Boiling Point.
- In June 2026, CBS News included the song in its list of the 250 essential American songs of the past 250 years.
