= Slave Songs of the United States =

Collection of African-American spirituals

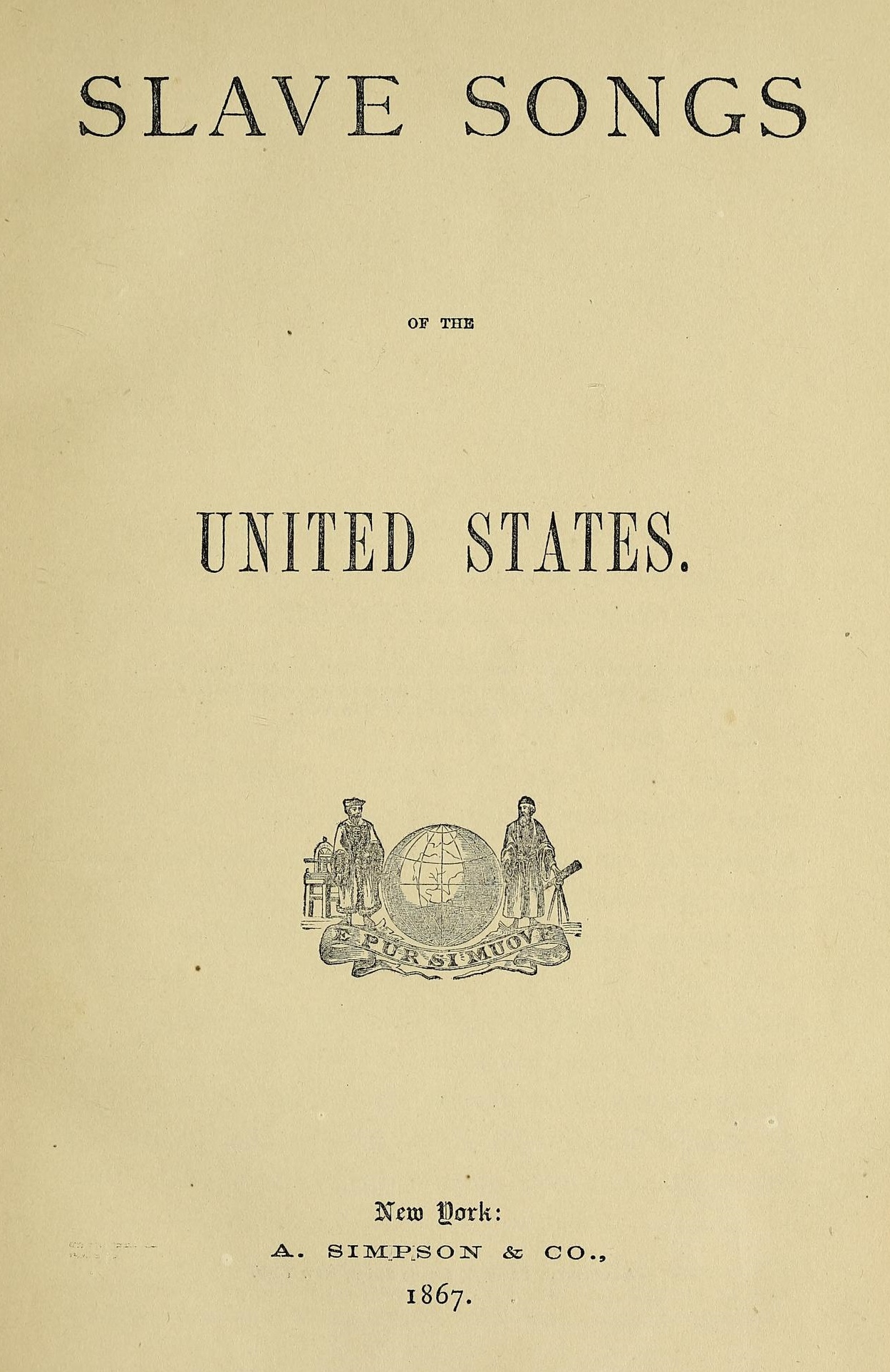
Slave Songs of the United States, title page

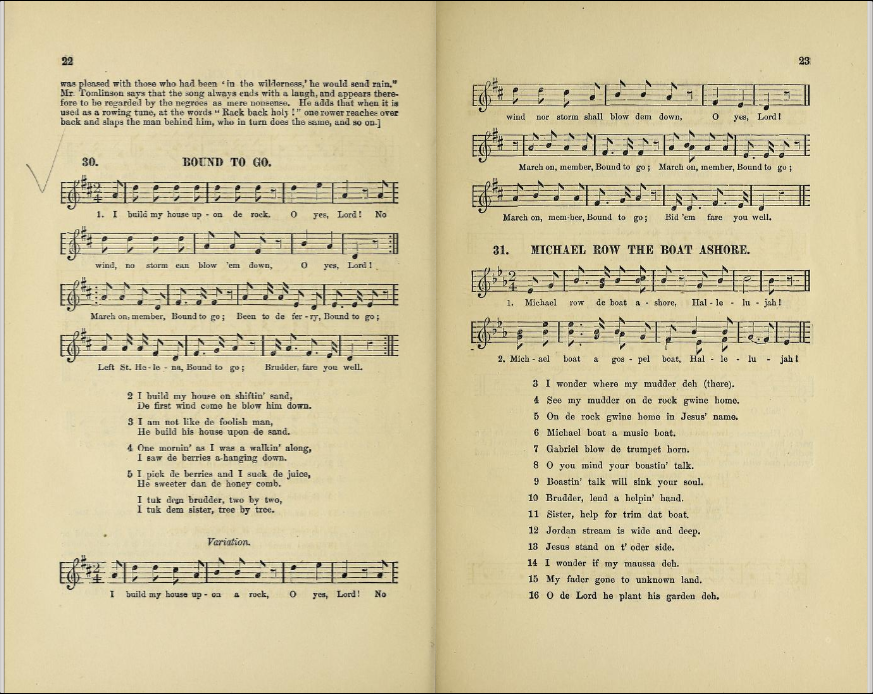
Michael Row the Boat Ashore

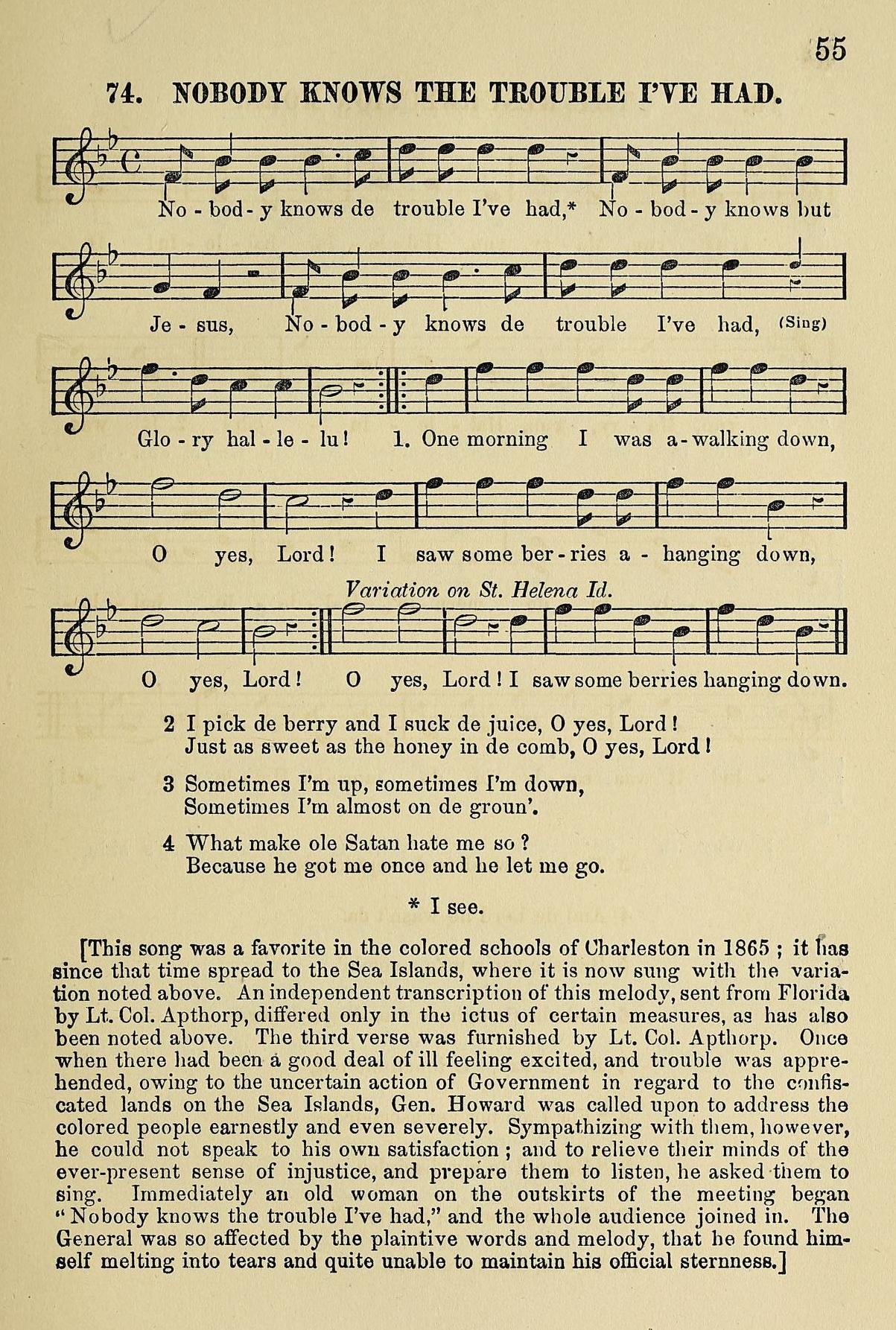
Nobody Knows the Trouble I've Seen

Slave Songs of the United States is a collection of African American music consisting of 136 songs. Published in 1867, it was the first, and most influential, collection of spirituals to be published. The collectors of the songs were Northern abolitionists William Francis Allen, Lucy McKim Garrison, and Charles Pickard Ware. The group transcribed songs sung by the Gullah Geechee people of Saint Helena Island, South Carolina. These people were newly freed slaves who were living in a refugee camp when these songs were collected. It is a "milestone not just in African American music but in modern folk history". It is also the first published collection of African-American music of any kind.

The making of the book is described by Samuel Charters, with an emphasis on the role of Lucy McKim Garrison. A segment of History Detectives explored the book's history and significance.

== Notable Songs ==
Several notable and popular songs in the book include:

- "Roll, Jordan, Roll" (#1)
- "Michael Row the Boat Ashore" (#31)
- "Bosom of Abraham" (#94 as "Rock My Soul")
- "Down in the River to Pray" (#104 as "The Good Old Way")
- "Jehova"
- "Hallelujah"
- "I hear from Heaven to-day"
- "Turn sinner"
- "Turn O"
- "Nobody knows the trouble I've had"
- "No Man can hinder me"
- "Heave away"
- "Charleston Gals"
- "I'm gwine to Alabamy"
- "I want to die like-a Lazarus die"
- "Belle Layotte"
- "On to Glory Jacob's Ladder"
- "My father, how long?"
- "Musieu Bainjo"
- "Lean on the Lord's side"
- "God got plenty o' room"

The book provides instructions for singing, which is accompanied by a discussion of the history of each song, with potential variations, interpretations of key references, and other related details. In the Dover edition, Harold Courlander contributes a new preface that evaluates the book's significance in both American musical and cultural history.

== See also ==
- "Nobody Knows the Trouble I've Seen"
- Songs of the Underground Railroad
- "Jimmy Crack Corn"
- Port Royal Experiment
- Port Royal Island
- Saint Helena Island (South Carolina)
- Coffin Point Plantation
- "Wade in the Water"
