= Ezekiel Saw the Wheel =

African American spiritual

"Ezekiel Saw the Wheel", often given as "Ezekiel Saw de Wheel" is an African American spiritual. The song's music and text has no known author, but originated among enslaved African Americans on Plantation complexes in the Southern United States sometime in the early 19th century. The lyrics to the song are based on Chapter I of the Book of Ezekiel. These lyrics were published in the poetry anthology American Poetry: The Nineteenth Century: Volume One, Freneau to Whitman. The song was part of the original repertoire of the Fisk Jubilee Singers when they began performing in the early 1870s, and was utilized on the vaudeville and concert stage during the latter part of 19th century. By 1900 the song was well known among white audiences throughout the United States as well as among black ones.

Ezekiel Saw the Wheel has been published in numerous song anthologies and hymnals. It has also been arranged by many different people over time. One notable arrangement for solo voice was made by Lawrence Benjamin Brown, a celebrated arranger of ethnographic music, which was first recorded by the singer Paul Robeson. Numerous choral arrangements have been created; including those by William L. Dawson, Harry Burleigh, Gerre Hancock, Moses Hogan, and Norman Luboff.

The spiritual has been recorded by such artists as Woody Guthrie, Louis Armstrong, John Lee Hooker, the Dixie Hummingbirds, the Tillers, the Fisk Jubilee Singers, The Charioteers, Gold City and George Beverly Shea. The song recounts the Old Testament prophet Ezekiel's divine vision, described at the start of the eponymous book.

Bing Crosby included the song in a medley on his album 101 Gang Songs (1961).

== Lyrics ==
Ezekiel saw the wheels;
Way in the middle of the air.
Ezekiel saw the wheels;
Way in the middle of the air.

Chorus

And the big wheel run by Faith, good Lord;
And the little wheel run by the Grace of God;
In the wheel in the wheel good Lord;
Way in the middle of the air.

Who's that yonder dressed in white?
Way in the middle of the air.
It must be the children of the Israelites:
Way in the middle of the air.

Chorus

And the big wheel run by Faith, good Lord;
And the little wheel run by the Grace of God;
In the wheel in the wheel in the wheel good Lord;
Way in the middle of the air.

Who's that yonder dressed in red?
Way in the middle of the air.
It must be the children that Moses led:
Way in the middle of the air.

Ezekiel saw the wheel;
Way up in the middle of the air.
Now Ezekiel saw the wheel in a wheel;
Way in the middle of the air.

Who's that yonder dressed in black?
Way in the middle of the air.
It must be the children running' back:
Way in the middle of the air.

Chorus

And the big wheel run by Faith, good Lord;
And the little wheel run by the Grace of God;
In the wheel in the wheel in the wheel good Lord;
Way in the middle of the air,
Way in the middle of the air.

== See also ==
- Christian child's prayer § Spirituals
