= We Are Climbing Jacob's Ladder =

Spiritual song

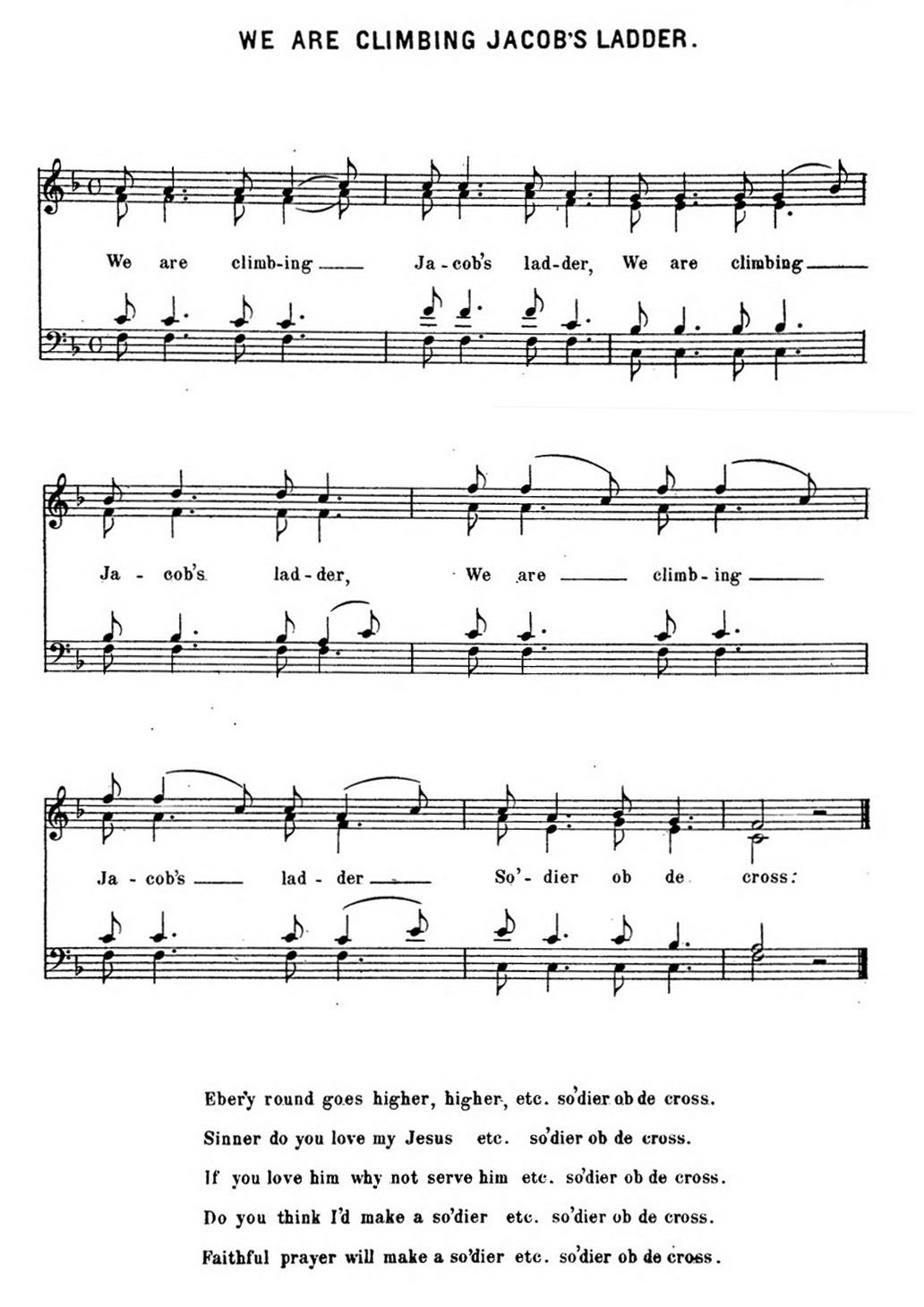
- Sheet music to 1907 version

Song
- Written: circa 1750 CE to 1825 CE
- Genre: Spiritual

We Are Climbing Jacob's Ladder (also known as Jacob's Ladder) is an African American spiritual based in part on the Biblical story of Jacob's Ladder. It was developed some time before 1825, and became one of the first slave spirituals to be widely sung by white Christians. A number of artists have recorded notable versions of it, and it was used as one of the main themes in the critically praised documentary The Civil War.

== About the song ==
African American slaves in the United States created a vibrant culture of resistance and dissent, despite attempts by slaveowners to indoctrinate them into passivity. Slaves were not permitted to speak while working in the fields, but were permitted to sing and chant in order to alleviate tedium and to impose a rhythm on repetitive motions. This generated two distinctive African American slave musical forms, the spiritual (sung music usually telling a story) and the field holler (sung or chanted music usually involving repetition of the leader's line).

We Are Climbing Jacob's Ladder is a spiritual. As a folk song originating in a repressed culture, the song's origins are lost. Some academics believe it emerged as early as 1750, and definitely no later than 1825, and was composed by American slaves taken from the area now known as Liberia. The spiritual utilizes the image of Jacob's ladder, and equates it with the body of Christ (in ways quite similar to the teachings of Catherine of Siena). The song is in the form of call and response, and although lyrics vary from place to place and over time, they generally emphasize spiritual growth, increasing one's knowledge about God, and a call to discipleship. The striving nature of this "climb" toward God is depicted as a series of tests, and draws heavily on the New Testament tradition of the Christian as warrior—in this case, overcoming the slave-owner. The traditional lyrics hold out hope that the slave can rise up and escape slavery, and the nature of the call-and-response asks both the singing respondents and the listener for greater sacrifice to reach the next level. The spiritual implies that God's promise to the Biblical patriarch Jacob will also lead the slave to freedom.

The song became one of the first African American spirituals to become popular among white Christians.

== Important recordings ==
Paul Robeson sang and later recorded an a cappella version, and the American labor movement used the song in the 1930s (sometimes altering the lyrics to reflect the industry being organized). Noted American folk singer Pete Seeger began singing the song some time in the 1930s or 1940s, and in the mid to late 1960s added a new verse ("We are dancing Sarah's circle") to reflect, as he saw it, a more feminist, less hierarchical, less restrictive, and more joyful meaning. These lyrics were publicly sung at least as early as 1969. Completely revised feminist lyrics were copyrighted in 1975 by Carole Etzler. Folk singer Arlo Guthrie recorded Seeger's version in 1996, with Seeger assisting with music and vocals, for Guthrie's two-record set, More Together Again. In 2006, rock musician Bruce Springsteen recorded Seeger's version of Jacob's Ladder for his album We Shall Overcome: The Seeger Sessions.

Dr. Bernice Johnson Reagon recorded an a cappella version of the song for her 1987 album River of Life: Harmony One (Flying Fish Records). It was later included on the soundtrack of the 1990 PBS miniseries The Civil War, which was directed by Ken Burns. Stephen Holden of The New York Times called it a "powerful rendition", while Jimmy Wolfe, host on WGTB radio in Washington, D.C., called Reagon's recording "a gem". Scott Alarik of The Boston Globe said Reagon's version is a "...passionate understanding of the pain the courage that fueled American spirituals. If there are still listeners who perceive this tune as a campfire singalong, or who have until now failed to feel the misery, longing and pride that pulses through such songs of slavery, they can't miss the point here."

== Lyrics ==
We Are Climbing Jacob's Ladder is sung as a call-and-response. The first two lines ("We are / climbing") are call-and-response, while the third line ("Jacob's ladder") is sung together. The first three lines are repeated, followed by a new call-and-response seventh line ("Soldier"), and then an eighth line ("of the cross") sung together. As a folk song, lyrics to We Are Climbing Jacob's Ladder varied widely, but one 1907 version listed the lyrics (with response in parentheses) as:

We are (we are)
Climbing (climbing)
Jacob's ladder
We are (we are)
Climbing (climbing)
Jacob's ladder
Soldier (soldier)
of the cross

Ev'ry round goes higher higher (x2) / soldier of the cross
Sinner do you love my Jesus (x2) / soldier of the cross
If you love Him why not serve Him (x2) / soldier of the cross
Do you think I'd make a soldier (x2) / soldier of the cross
Faithful prayer will make a soldier (x2) / soldier of the cross
