= Charles Pickard Ware =

American abolitionist and slave song transcriber (1840–1921)

Charles Pickard Ware (c. 1840–1921) was an American educator and music transcriber. An abolitionist, he served as a civilian administrator in the Union Army, where he was a labor superintendent of freedmen on plantations at Port Royal, South Carolina, during the American Civil War. This included Seaside Plantation. It is here that he transcribed many slave songs with tunes and lyrics, later published in Slave Songs of the United States, which he edited with William Francis Allen and Lucy McKim Garrison. It was the first published collection of American folk music.

Ware was also an educator in Boston, Massachusetts.
