= Sarah McKim =

American abolitionist

Sarah McKim (née Speakman) (1813 – 1891) was an American abolitionist.

== Early life ==
McKim was born Sarah Allibone Speakman on March 1, 1813, in Concordville, Pennsylvania. She was the youngest child of Micajah and Phoebe (Smith) Speakman, and was raised in a Quaker family. Her family moved to Highland Farm in Chester County, Pennsylvania, in 1826.

== Abolitionist activity ==
McKim was a member of Philadelphia Female Anti-Slavery Society. Together, she and her husband campaigned for the abolition of slavery and became influential supporters of the underground railroad organization that was centered in Philadelphia, also assisting in many emerging court cases after the passage of the Fugitive Slave Law. during the Civil War. In 1859, she and her husband escorted Mary Brown, the wife of abolitionist John Brown, to Virginia after his failed raid on Harpers Ferry.

== Personal life ==
Her engagement to James Miller McKim, a prominent abolitionist and Presbyterian minister, was announced in Philadelphia in June 1838. They married on October 1, 1840. Following her marriage, Sarah McKim was expelled from her Quaker assembly but continued to consider herself a Quaker.

The McKims initially lived in Philadelphia and moved to Germantown in 1855. They had two children, Charles Follen McKim (1847-1909) and Lucy McKim Garrison (1842-1877). In June 1866, Sarah and James McKim established a joint household with Lucy and Wendell Phillips Garrison in Llewellyn Park, New Jersey.

== Death ==
McKim died on January 9, 1891, in Llewellyn Park.
