= Hendon Chubb =

- Born: March 19, 1874; Brooklyn, New York
- Died: September 3, 1960 (aged 86); South Dartmouth, Massachusetts
- Education: Sheffield Scientific School
- Spouse(s): Alice Margaret Lee (m. 1898; died 1955) Marian Knight Garrison (m. 1959; died 1960)
- Children: 3
- Parent(s): Thomas Caldecot Chubb; Victoria Edds

Hendon Chubb (March 19, 1874 – September 3, 1960) was an American insurance executive who established the Chubb Fellowship at Yale.

== Early life ==
Chubb was born in Brooklyn, New York on March 19, 1874. He was the youngest son of Thomas Caldecot Chubb and Victoria Edds (1833–1917), a daughter of William Edds. His parents were both born in England and emigrated to the United States. His older siblings included Sidney Caldecot Chubb (who married Mary Eugenia Ely), Percy Chubb (who married Helen Low), and Mabel Ada Victoria Chubb (who married Dr. Robert Holmes Greene).

His paternal grandparents were John and Sarah Chubb of St Pancras, Soper Lane, London.

He was educated at Dearborn Morgan School in Orange, New Jersey before graduating from the Sheffield Scientific School at Yale University in 1895.

== Career ==
In 1882, his father elder brother, Percy, opened a marine underwriting business in the seaport district of New York City. They collected $1,000 each from 100 prominent merchants to start their venture, initially focusing on insuring ships and cargoes. After his father died in 1887, brother Percy took over as head of the firm. Hendon became a partner in 1895. After Percy's death in 1930, Hendon became senior partner, serving in that role until his retirement in 1959. Upon his brother's death in 1930, he inherited Percy's "Springwood" estate, a ten-thousand-acre plantation in Thomasville, Georgia.

Chubb also founded, and was serving as chairman emeritus, of Federal Insurance Company, which had assets of more than $220,000,000, at the time of his death. He was involved in the development of the American Institute of Marine Underwriters and the Board of Underwriters of New York. During World War I, he served as a Director of War Risk Insurance (serving as chairman from 1914 to 1918), and an Insurance Advisor to the United States Shipping Board and the American Red Cross.

In 1924, he established the Victoria Foundation, named in honor of his mother, which makes grants for medical research. In 1936, he endowed the Chubb Fellowship at Yale for "…the encouragement and aid of students interested in government and public affairs."

== Personal life ==
On June 6, 1898, Chubb was married to Alice Margaret Lee (1874–1955) at Grace Episcopal Church in Orange, New Jersey. The service was read by Rev. Alexander Mann, Archdeacon of Newark, and the marriage ceremony was performed by Rev. Dr. Anthony Schuyler, rector of the church. She was the daughter of Samuel Lee and Annie (née Vanderhoof) Lee. They lived in Llewellyn Park in West Orange, New Jersey. Before her death in 1955, they were the parents of:

- Thomas Caldecot Chubb (1899–1972), a writer and poet who married Caroline (née Parker) Smith, a daughter of John Dwight Parker who was the former wife of Walton Hall Smith, in 1929. They divorced in 1938 shortly before her death from amebic dysentery. He married Edith Rosine Onions in 1938.
- Alice "Margaret" Chubb (1901–1976), who married J. Russell Parsons, a partner with Chubb & Son who was the son of diplomat James Russell Parsons, in 1921.
- Percy Chubb II (1909–1982), who married Corinne Roosevelt Alsop, a daughter of Corinne (née Robinson) Alsop Cole, and Joseph Wright Alsop IV.

After her death, he married Marian (née Knight) Garrison, the widow of Philip McKim Garrison and daughter-in-law of Wendell Phillips Garrison and Lucy McKim Garrison.

Chubb died on September 3, 1960 at his summer home on Mishaum Point in South Dartmouth, Massachusetts. He was buried at the Holy Innocents Cemetery in West Orange, New Jersey. His widow lived until July 1974, dying in her 101st year.

=== Descendants ===
Through his daughter Margaret, he was a grandfather of James Russell Parsons IV (1922–1943), who was killed in Italy during World War II; Frances Dorothea Parsons (1926–1999), who married Dr. René A. Pingeon; Victoria Parsons (1928–2013), who married lawyer Robert Morgan Pennoyer (a grandson of J. P. Morgan Jr.); and Margaret Hendon Parsons, who married lawyer Franklin E. Parker III.
