= Garrison Norton =

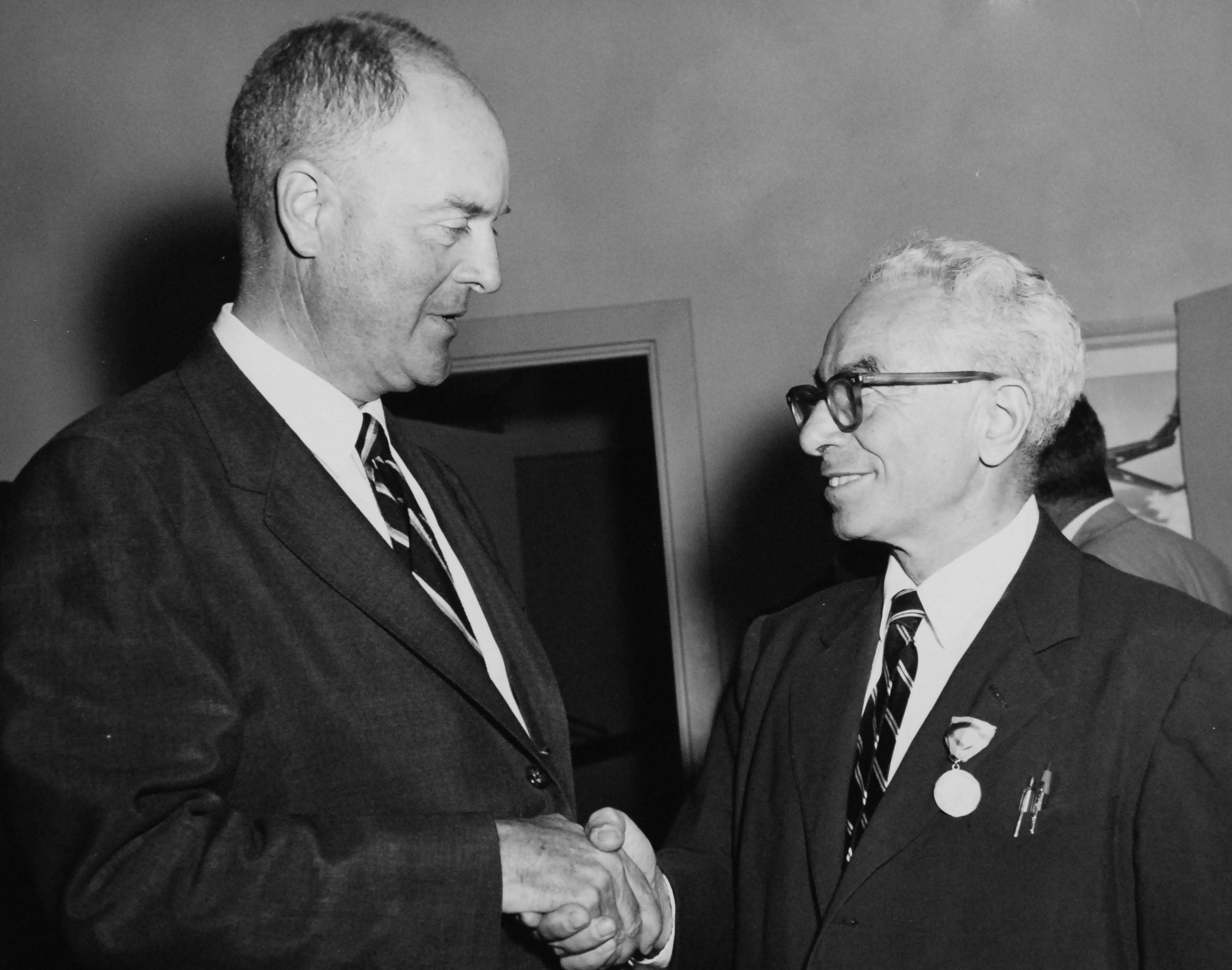
- Norton (left)

Assistant Secretary of the Navy
- In office July 7, 1956 – February 5, 1959
- Preceded by: James H. Smith Jr.
- Succeeded by: James H. Wakelin Jr. (as Assistant Secretary of the Navy (Research and Development))

Personal details
- Born: October 9, 1900 Chicago, Illinois, U.S.
- Died: September 9, 1995 (aged 94)
- Party: Republican
- Spouse: Emily McMullan (m. 1943)
- Relations: Wendell Phillips Garrison (grandfather); Lucy McKim Garrison (grandmother); Lloyd K. Garrison (cousin)
- Children: 2
- Parent(s): Charles D. Norton; Katherine McKim Garrison
- Education: Groton School
- Alma mater: Harvard College

Garrison Norton (October 9, 1900 – September 9, 1995) was Assistant Secretary of the Navy (AIR) from 1956 to 1959.

== Early life ==
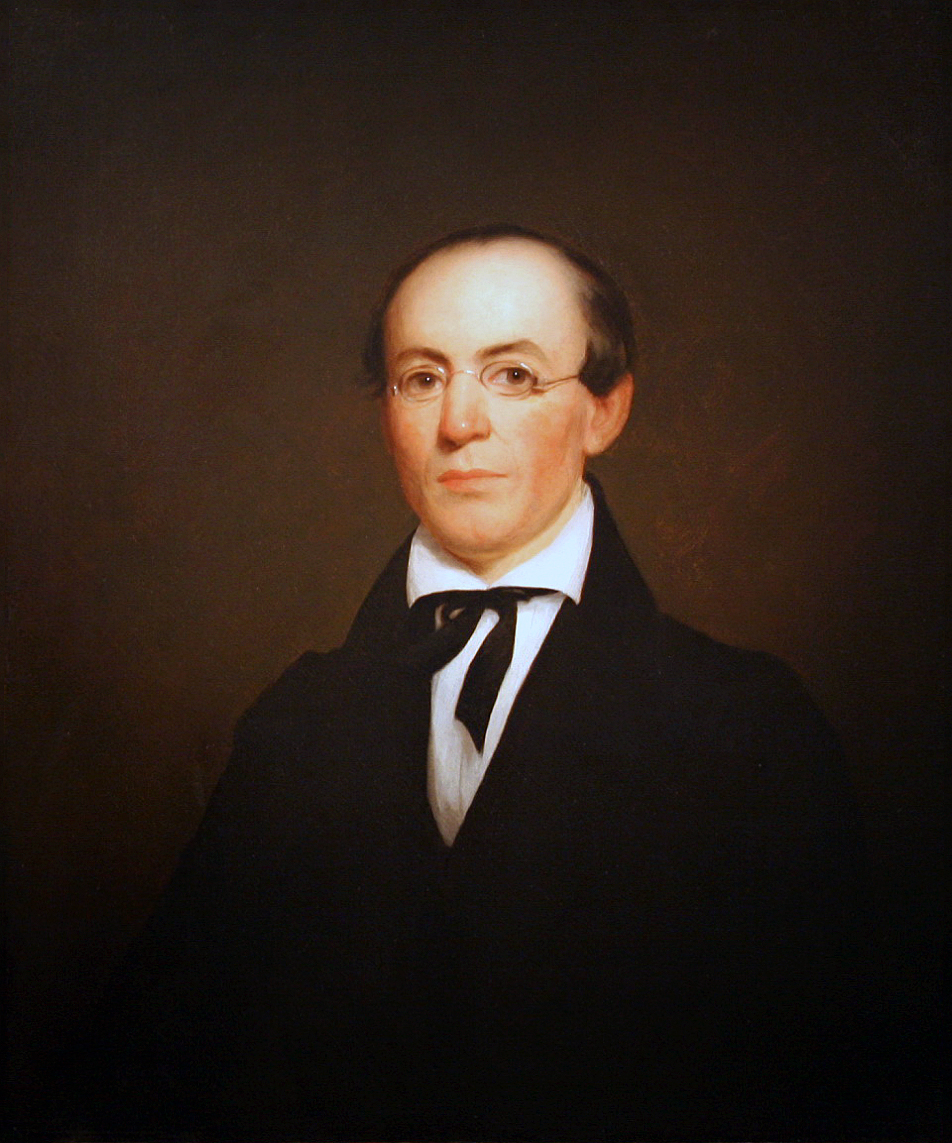
1833 Portrait of his great-grandfather, William Lloyd Garrison, by Nathaniel Jocelyn which Norton bequeathed to the National Portrait Gallery, Smithsonian Institution.

Garrison Norton was born in Chicago on October 9, 1900, the son of banker Charles Dyer Norton and the former Katherine McKim Garrison. His father was a "man of impeccable London tailoring and equally impeccable conservatism" who served as Assistant Secretary of the Treasury and Secretary to President Taft. Garrison, however, was described as "receptive to new ideas and as liberal as his father was conservative" even though he was also a Republican.

His maternal grandparents were editor Wendell Phillips Garrison (a son of the Civil War abolitionist William Lloyd Garrison) and the poet Lucy McKim Garrison (a daughter of Presbyterian minister James Miller McKim and sister to architect Charles Follen McKim).

He was raised in Washington, D. C. and Manhattan and attended the Groton School. He was educated at Harvard College, receiving a bachelor's degree cum laude in 1923. While at Harvard, he was a member of the school's first 150-pound varsity crew team.

== Career ==
After college, Norton joined the accounting firm of Arthur Young & Company. During this period, Norton became interested in aviation and received his Private Pilot License. This brought him in contact with several figures in the aviation industry, some of whom became his clients. He was made a partner of Arthur Young & Company in 1932.

=== Government service ===
Norton first joined the government in 1934, when he became deputy general manager of the Home Owners' Loan Corporation. He later went on to serve as assistant to the chairman of the Civil Aeronautics Authority and director of the Office of Transport and Communications in the State Department.

With the outbreak of World War II, Norton enlisted in the United States Navy serving as a Navy flight instructor and with the Bureau of Aeronautics, ultimately attaining the rank of captain by the war's end in 1945. In 1947, President of the United States Harry S. Truman nominated Norton as an Assistant Secretary of State, with responsibility for international transportation and communications. He held this office until 1949.

He served as a director of the Export-Import Bank and as an alternate governor of the World Bank and the International Monetary Fund before leaving the State Department in 1949. In the early 1950s, he worked for Donald A. Quarles, the Secretary of the Air Force, in research and development. In 1956, President Dwight D. Eisenhower nominated Norton to succeed James H. Smith Jr. as Assistant Secretary of the Navy (AIR), and he would serve in this office from July 7, 1956, until February 5, 1959. His primary goal as Assistant Secretary of the Navy was with expanding the Navy's research and development capabilities. He was the last Assistant Secretary of the Navy (AIR), as the post was re-designated Assistant Secretary of the Navy (Research and Development) in 1959.

=== Later life ===
Norton left government in 1959, becoming president of the Institute for Defense Analyses, succeeding Gen. James McCormack, who became vice president of MIT. He served as president until his retirement in the 1960s. He also went on to serve as chairman of the Carnegie Institution for Science.

== Personal life ==
In 1943, Norton was married to Emily McMullan, who trained as a surgical nurse and served in World War II. Together, they had a home in Georgetown and a farm in North Haven, Maine. They were the parents of a son and daughter:

- Glenavie Norton, the Chair of Americans for Democratic Action in Southeast, Pennsylvania.
- Charles Dyer Norton II (d. 1970)

He died on September 9, 1995, at the age of 94 in his home in Washington, D. C.

Government offices
Preceded by James H. Smith Jr.	Assistant Secretary of the Navy (AIR); July 7, 1956 – February 5, 1959	Succeeded by James H. Wakelin Jr. (as Assistant Secretary of the Navy (Research and Development))
