= James Russell Parsons =

American diplomat (1861–1905)

James Russell Parsons Jr. (February 20, 1861 – December 5, 1905) was an American educator, writer, and diplomat who served as consul general in Mexico City.

== Early life ==
Parsons was born on February 20, 1861 in Hoosick Falls, Rensselaer County, New York. He was one of five sons of James Russell Parsons (1830–1899) and Eliza Edgerton (née Hinsdill) Parsons (1835–1896). Among his siblings were Willard Pope Parsons (who married Lillian Tompkins), and Hinsdill Parsons, the general counsel for General Electric who also died in an automobile accident (he married Jessie Mary Burchard, a sister of Anson Wood Burchard).

He attended Trinity College in Hartford, Connecticut, graduating as valedictorian of his class. Two years later the degree of A.B. was conferred on him and in, 1902, he was made an LLB.

== Career ==
From 1882 to 1883, he served as private secretary to Bishop John Williams of Connecticut, before he became School Commissioner of the First District, Rensselaer County from 1884 to 1887. At the same time, he was created Inspector of Teachers' Training Classes under the New York State Department of Public Instruction. In 1891, he became Inspector of Secondary Schools for the University of the State of New York.

When Theodore Roosevelt, a close friend of Parsons, became Governor of New York in 1899, he appointed him to the New York State Board of Regents.

=== Diplomatic career ===
Parsons was known to be "extremely bright, and fluent in Greek and Hebrew". From 1888 to 1890, he was American consul to Aix-la-Chapelle (also known as Aachen) in Germany.

When Roosevelt became president in 1904, he made Parsons consul general to Mexico. In 1905, not long after the family had moved from Elk Nest, Albany, to Mexico City, he was killed when his carriage collided with a streetcar. His wife and son were with him during the accident. His son emerged unscathed but his wife sustained minor injuries.

== Personal life ==
On February 8, 1896 Parsons was married to author Frances Theodora (née Smith) Dana (1861–1952), the daughter of New York tea merchant Denton Smith and widow of naval officer William Starr Dana (who died during the 1890 flu epidemic). Before his early death, they were the parents of two children:

- James Russell Parsons III (1896–1970), who married Alice "Margaret" Chubb, a daughter of Hendon Chubb and granddaughter of Thomas Caldecot Chubb, founder of Chubb & Son.
- Dorothea Parsons (1900–1902), who died young.

Following his death in an automobile accident on December 5, 1905 in Mexico City, his body was returned to the United States, where he was buried at Albany Rural Cemetery in Menands, New York. His widow lived until 1952.
