= Halcyon Park, Bloomfield, New Jersey =

Populated place in Essex County, New Jersey, US

Coordinates: 40.784026°N 74.187745°W

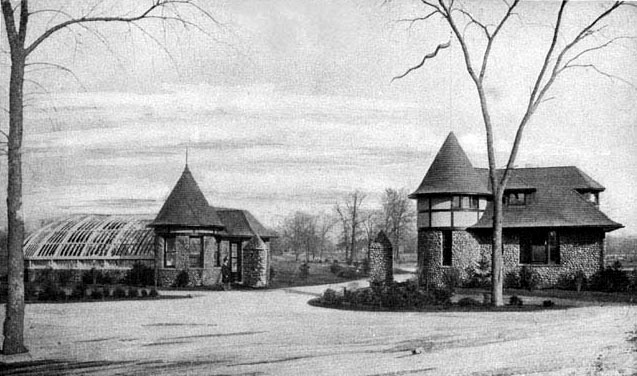
Halcyon Park Gatehouse, circa 1895

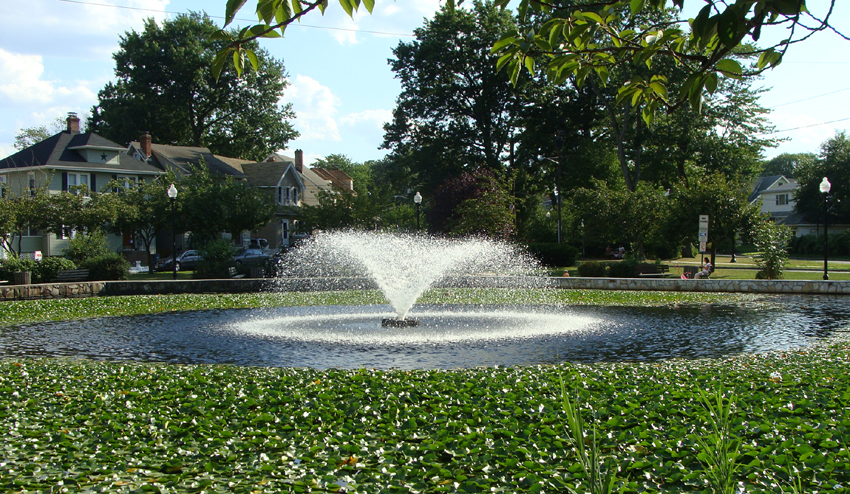
Halcyon Park, August 2011

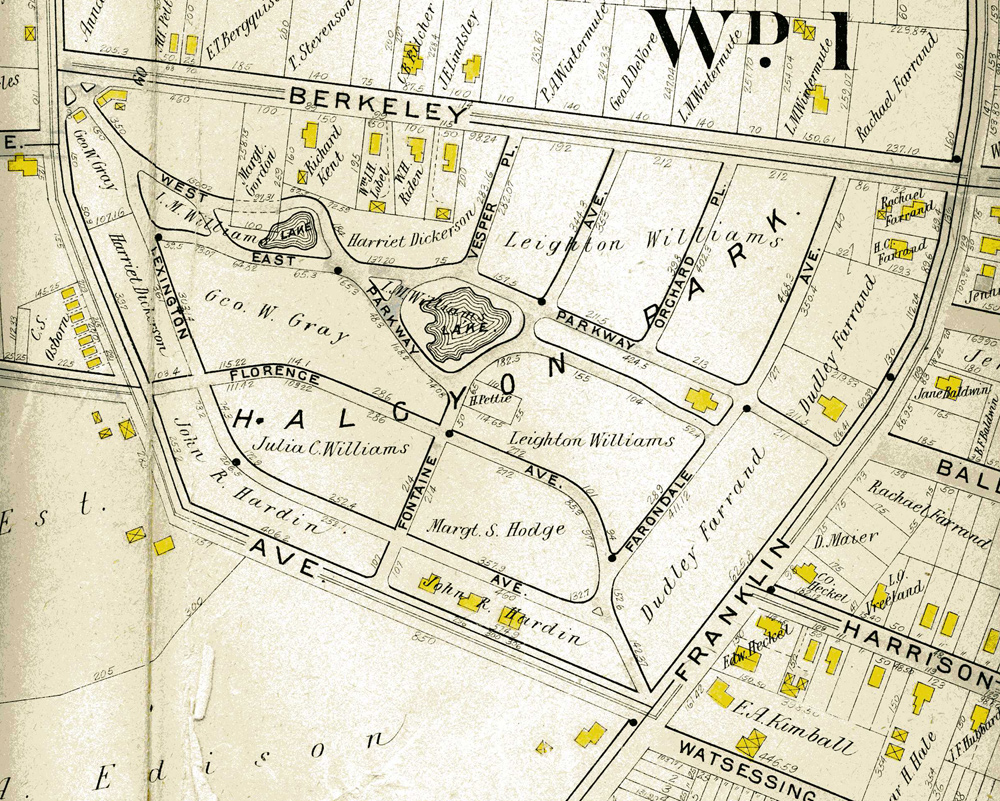
Map of Halcyon Park from 1906 Atlas of Essex County

Halcyon Park is an unincorporated community that was developed by Reverend Cyrus Kemper Capron in Bloomfield, in Essex County, in the U.S. state of New Jersey, in 1895 as a planned community of homes with trees and shrubs, picturesque cottages, ponds and common grounds to be maintained by a caretaker and gardener. It is believed that Halcyon Park was inspired by Llewellyn Park, the first planned garden suburb about three miles away. Capron envisioned a private residential park for individuals of moderate means to offer all the advantages of the city (proximity to two railroads and a trolley for access to Newark and New York City, water, gas, sewer and paved streets) and the country (trees, ponds, picturesque landscape). The original plan laid out 182 lots and common grounds to include a club house and tennis courts for common use by a lot-owners association. The Club House contained a bowling alley, billiard table, library and stage. The common grounds included a gate house, a conservatory, and two ponds. The land was developed with water, sewer and gas lines and paved streets, innovative at the time.

In the early 1900s most of the lots remained vacant. Development was halted in 1907 due to the Financial panic of 1907. The common properties fell into disrepair and the Clubhouse burned down in 1910. Capron declared bankruptcy.

The property was sold to Philip Bowers in 1907. By 1914 there were still many vacant lots, but by 1932, almost every available plot of ground was occupied by a "well appointed home of diversified architecture."

== Halcyon Park today ==
In 1995, Halcyon Park was added to the New Jersey Register of Historic Places and the National Register of Historic Places as eligible as an "intact collection of early twentieth century residential housing in a planned setting reflecting attention to open space and neighborhood character." A report commissioned by NJ Transit in 1995 in preparation for planning the Newark Light Rail Extension into Bloomfield, stated that "Houses within Halcyon Park, built between 1905 and 1930 include a number of well-preserved examples of early-twentieth century residential architecture in Bungalow, American Foursquare, Colonial Revival, Tudor, and Queen Anne styles" and that "Halcyon Park Historic District is eligible for the National Register under Criterion C as an intact twentieth century planned middle-class residential community with a cross-section of the vernacular architectural styles from that period."
