= Lord Frederick =

Lord Frederick may refer to:

- Lord Frederick Beauclerk (1773–1850), noted English cricketer
- Lord Frederick Cambridge (1907–1940), descendant of the British Royal Family
- Lord Frederick Campbell (1729–1816), Scottish nobleman and politician
- Lord Frederick Cavendish (1836–1882), English Liberal politician
- Lord Frederick Cavendish (British Army officer) (1729–1803), British field marshal and Whig politician
- Lord Frederick FitzClarence (1799–1854), Knight Grand Cross of the Royal Guelphic Order
- Lord Frederick Spencer Hamilton (1856–1928), United Kingdom politician
- Lord Frederick Windsor (born 1979), British financial analyst

== See also ==
- Frederick Lord (disambiguation)
