= Charles D. Norton =

American banker (1871–1923)

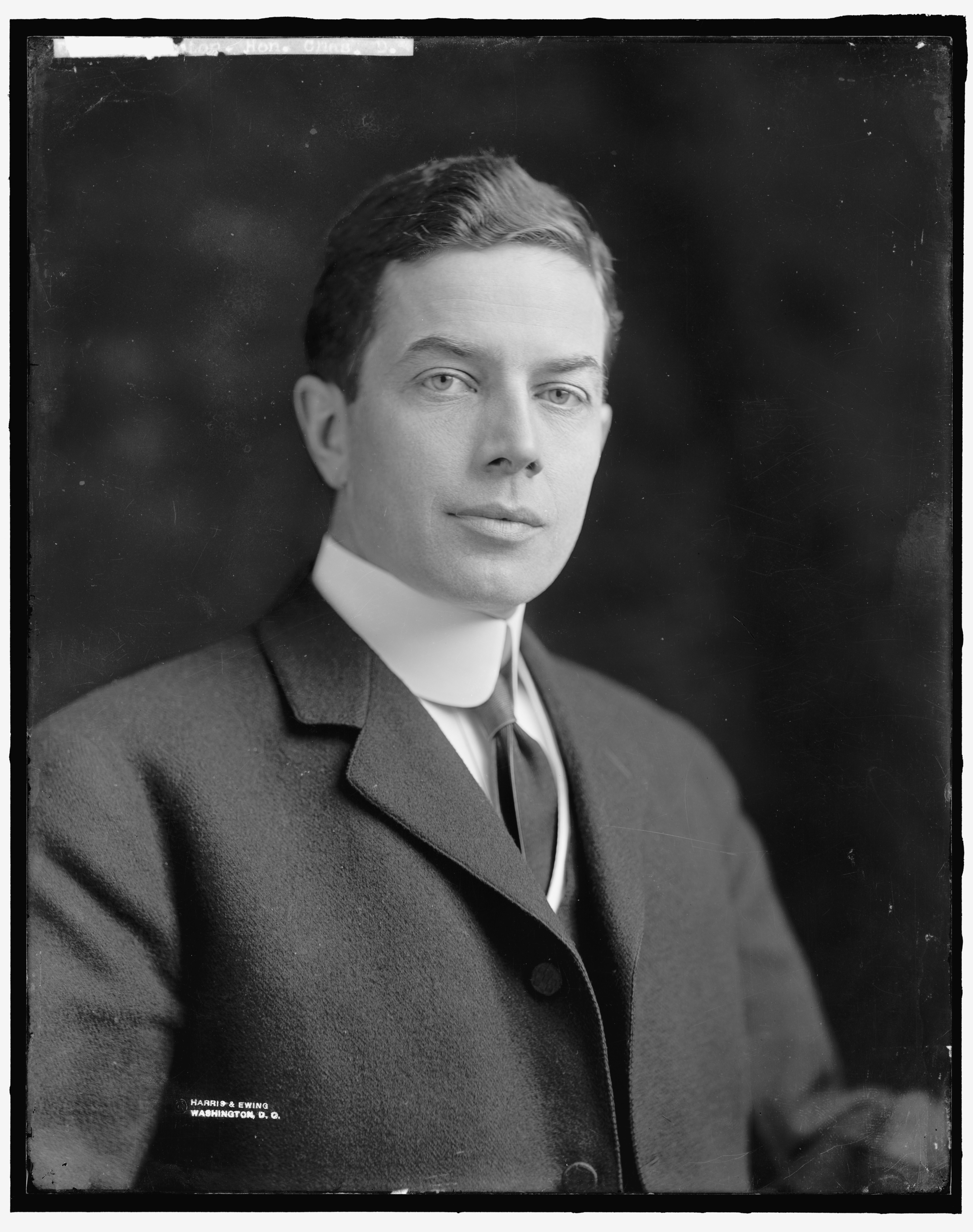
- Norton while Assistant Secretary of the Treasury, 1910

Secretary to the President
- In office 1910–1911
- President: William Howard Taft
- Preceded by: Fred W. Carpenter
- Succeeded by: Charles D. Hilles

United States Assistant Secretary of the Treasury
- In office 1909–1910
- Preceded by: Louis A. Coolidge
- Succeeded by: A. Piatt Andrew

Personal details
- Born: Charles Dyer Norton; March 12, 1871 Oshkosh, Wisconsin, U.S.
- Died: March 6, 1923 (aged 51) New York City, New York, U.S.
- Party: Republican
- Spouse: Katherine McKim Garrison (m. 1897)
- Children: 3
- Parent(s): Franklin Burroughs Norton; Harriet Arvilla Dyer
- Education: Amherst College

Charles Dyer Norton (March 12, 1871 – March 6, 1923) was an American banker who served as the Assistant Secretary of the Treasury and Secretary to President William Howard Taft.

== Early life ==
Norton was born on March 12, 1871, in Oshkosh, Wisconsin. He was a son of the Rev. Franklin Burroughs Norton (1833–1895) and Harriet Arvilla (née Dyer) Norton (1846–1921). Through his mother, he was a direct descendant of Mary Dyer, the Quaker martyr, and of Roger Williams, founder of Rhode Island.

He graduated from Amherst College with the class of 1893. His father had graduated from Amherst in 1856.

== Career ==
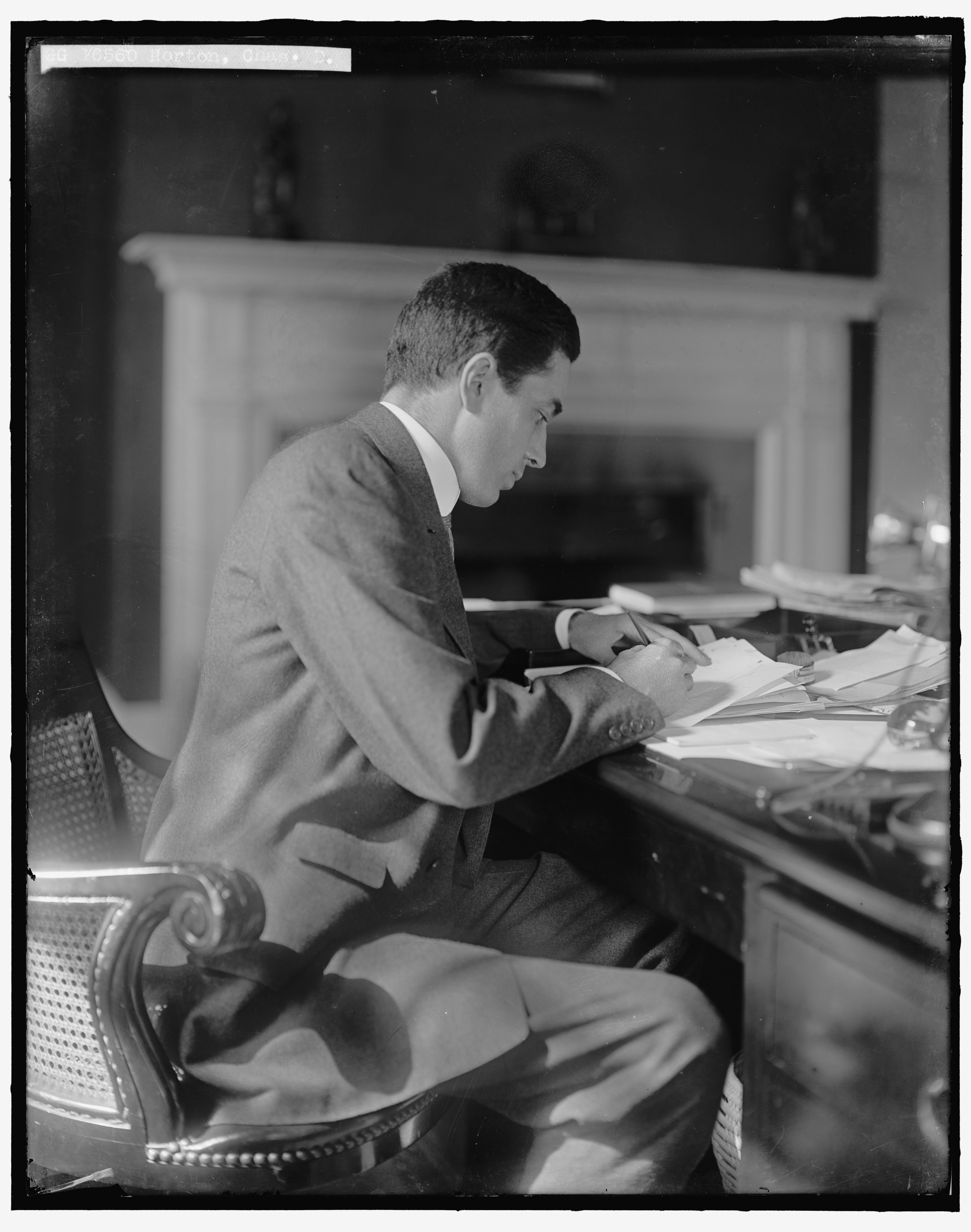
Norton working at his desk, 1910

Norton spent several years with Scribner's Magazine before becoming associated with the Northwest Mutual Life Insurance Company, eventually becoming general agent for the company in Chicago. He stayed with Northwest Mutual until 1909 when he became Assistant Secretary of the Treasury under President Taft's Secretary Franklin MacVeagh, replacing Louis A. Coolidge who served under President Roosevelt's Secretary George B. Cortelyou. In 1910, Norton left the Treasury Department (and was succeeded by A. Piatt Andrew) to become Secretary to President William Howard Taft, where he "organized the Commission on Economy and Efficiency which prepared the Government estimates on a budge basis for the first time." He worked for Taft for one year and was succeeded by fellow former Assistant Secretary of the Treasury, Charles D. Hilles.

In 1911, he left the White House to become Vice President of the First National Bank of New York (which later became Citibank). He replaced Thomas W. Lamont, who left to become a partner at J. P. Morgan & Co. In 1918, Norton retired as vice president of the Bank, and became president of the First Security Company, an affiliated institution, succeeding George Fisher Baker who became chairman of the board.

Norton was president of the Coal and Coke Railway Company, the New Gauley Coal Corporation and a vice president of the West Virginia Coal and Coke Company. He was a trustee of the Adams Express Company and a director of the American Railway Express Company, the First National Bank, Equitable Life Assurance Society, Montgomery Ward & Co., Delaware, Lackawanna and Western Coal Co., American Telephone and Telegraph Company among others.

=== Philanthropy and volunteer efforts ===
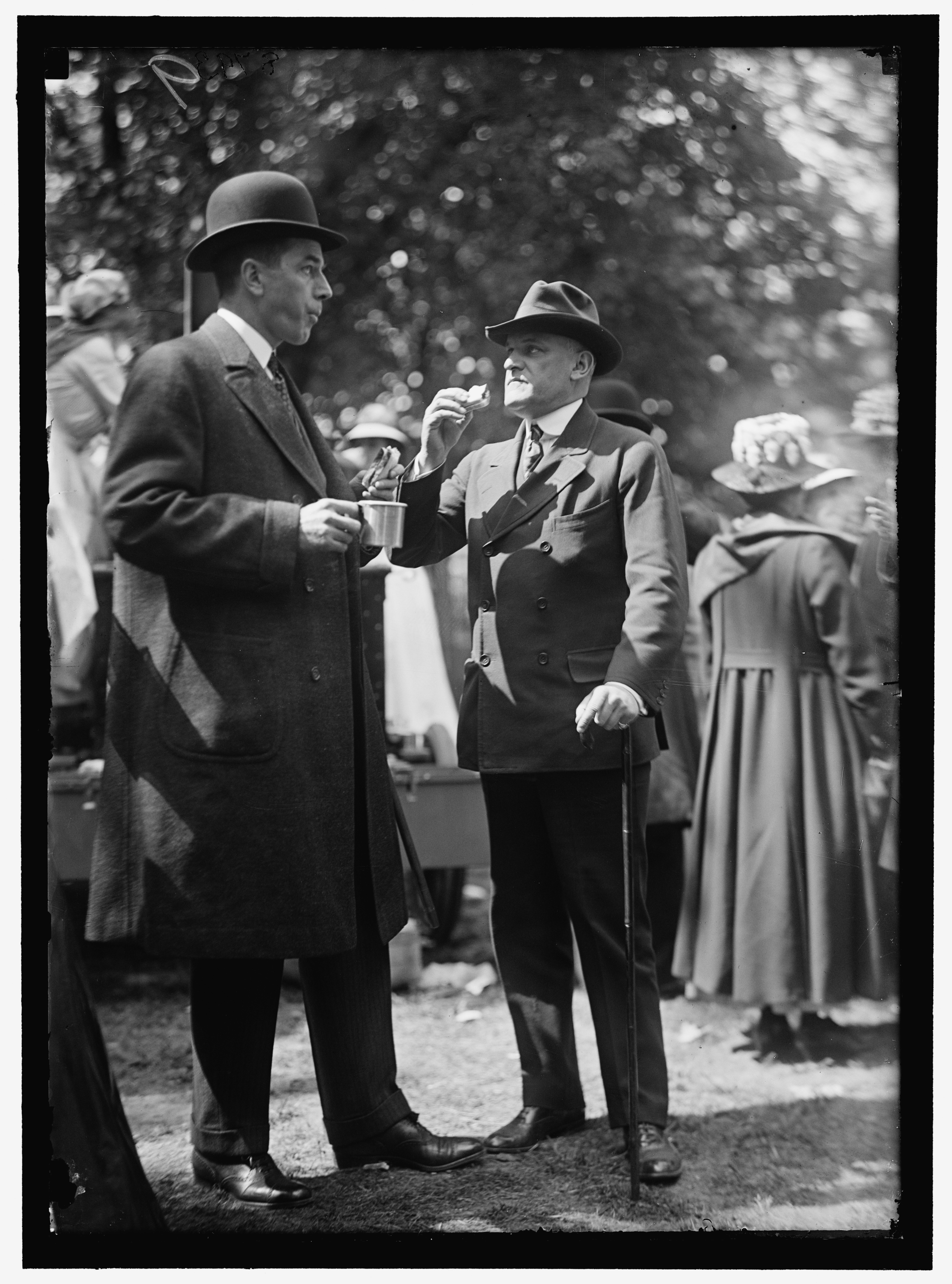
Norton at a Red Cross Luncheon on General Scott's Lawn, 1917

While at the Treasury, Norton became a member of the Executive Committee and Treasurer of the American Red Cross as well as a trustee. In 1917, President Woodrow Wilson appointed him one of the five members of the Red Cross War Council, which assumed the management of the Red Cross in its war work. He also served as a trustee of the Russell Sage Foundation and was chairman of the Special Committee on Plan of New York and its Environs as well as the Metropolitan Museum of Art, the American Academy in Rome, and a trustee and treasurer of the American Federation of Arts.

== Personal life ==
In 1897, Norton was married to Katherine McKim Garrison (1873–1948) of Llewellyn Park in West Orange, New Jersey. She was a daughter of prominent editor and author Wendell Phillips Garrison and the poet Lucy (née McKim) Garrison. Katherine's grandfather was the prominent abolitionist William Lloyd Garrison and among her family were aunt Fanny Garrison Villard (wife of railroad tycoon Henry Villard) and maternal uncle Charles Follen McKim, the prominent New York architect. They were the parents of three children:

- Garrison Norton (1900–1995), the Assistant Secretary of the Navy who married Emily McMullan.
- Lucia Garrison Norton (1902–1992), who married Alan C. Valentine in 1928.
- Charles McKim Norton (1907–1991), who married pianist Martha Chipman Hutcheson (d. 1988) in 1939.

Norton died of complications from influenza on March 6, 1923, at 4 East 66th Street, his home in New York City. At the time of his death, his eldest son was a senior at Harvard, his daughter was a senior at Smith, and his younger son was at Groton. He was buried at Rosedale Cemetery in New Jersey. His widow, who never remarried, died in New York on February 8, 1948.

Government offices
Preceded by Louis A. Coolidge	Assistant Secretary of the Treasury; 1909 – 1910	Succeeded by A. Piatt Andrew
