= Wendell Phillips Garrison =

American poet

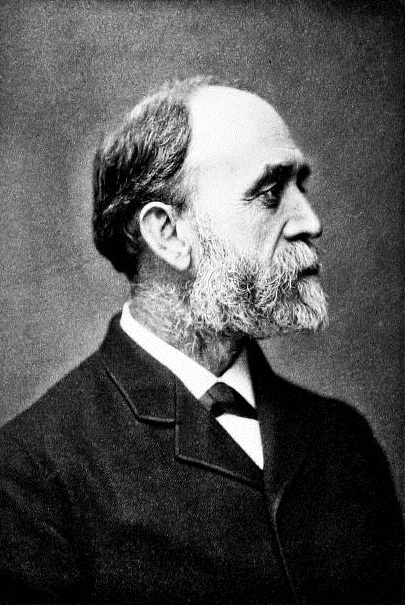
- Born: June 4, 1840; Cambridgeport, Massachusetts, U.S.
- Died: February 7, 1907 (aged 66); South Orange, New Jersey, U.S.
- Education: Harvard College
- Occupations: Journalist, editor
- Spouse: Lucy McKim (m. 1865; died 1877)
- Children: 3
- Parent(s): William Lloyd Garrison; Helen Eliza Benson
- Relatives: Garrison Norton (grandson); Lloyd K. Garrison (grandson); Fanny Garrison Villard (sister)

Wendell Phillips Garrison (June 4, 1840 – February 27, 1907) was an American editor and author.

== Early life ==
Garrison was born on June 4, 1840, at Cambridgeport, Massachusetts. He was the third son of the abolitionist William Lloyd Garrison and Helen Eliza (née Benson) Garrison. Among his three siblings were brother William Lloyd Garrison Jr. (a prominent advocate of the single tax) and sister Helen Frances Garrison (a suffragette who married railroad tycoon Henry Villard).

He graduated from Harvard in 1861 and his father's abolitionist newspaper, The Liberator, ended in 1865, after passage of the Thirteenth Amendment to the U.S. Constitution. Very much a successor was The Nation, which began in 1865 and of which he was Literary Editor, but backed up by his father's vast network of contacts.

== Career ==
As a young man, Garrison had adopted pacifist and anti-imperialist beliefs. He had assisted E. L. Godkin in establishing the magazine. Henry Villard, who merged The Nation with the New York Evening Post, was Garrison's brother-in-law. Garrison also wrote several books, including What Mr. Darwin Saw, an abridged and illustrated version of Darwin's The Voyage of the Beagle for children.

== Personal life ==
In 1865, Garrison was married to Lucy McKim (1842–1877), daughter of Presbyterian minister James Miller McKim and Sarah Allibone (née Speakman) McKim. Her younger brother was Charles Follen McKim, a prominent architect with the firm of McKim, Mead & White. Together, Wendell and Lucy lived in Llewellyn Park in West Orange, New Jersey, and were the parents of three children, one daughter and two sons:

- Lloyd McKim Garrison (1867–1900), who married Alice Kirkham in 1896. After his death she married Frederic Wait Lord.
- Philip McKim Garrison (1869–1935), who married Marian Knight. After his death, she married Hendon Chubb, son of Thomas Caldecot Chubb.
- Katherine McKim Garrison (1873–1948), who married banker Charles Dyer Norton, Assistant Secretary of the Treasury and Secretary to President William Howard Taft, in 1897.

Garrison died on February 27, 1907, at Dr. Runyon's Sanitarium in South Orange, New Jersey.

== Works ==
W. P. Garrison contributed to periodicals, compiled Bedside Poetry: A Parents' Assistant (1887), and wrote:

- What Mr. Darwin Saw in his Voyage Round the World in the Ship "Beagle", Harper & Bros., 1880 [1st Pub. 1879].
- William Lloyd Garrison, Vol. 2, Vol. 3, Vol. 4, Houghton, Mifflin Company, 1885-1889 [with his brother, F. J. Garrison, a life of their father].
- The Reform of the Senate, Reprinted from the Atlantic Monthly, 1891.
- Parables for School and Home, Longmans, Green & Co., 1897.
- The New Gulliver, The Marion Press, 1898 [a satire on Calvinism].
- Memoirs of Henry Villard, Vol. 2, Houghton, Mifflin & Company, 1904.
- Letters and Memorials of Wendell Philips Garrison, Houghton Mifflin Company, 1909 [1st Pub. 1908].

=== Articles ===
- "William Lloyd Garrison," The Century Magazine, August 1885.
- "William James Stillman," The Century Magazine, September 1893.
