= Frothingham =

Frothingham is a surname, which may refer to:

- Alice Wilson Frothingham (1902–1976), ceramics curator at the Hispanic Society of America in New York.
- Arthur Frothingham (1859–1923), an early professor of art history at Princeton University.
- Ellen Frothingham (1835–1902), a translator of German-language works into English.
- Helen Losanitch Frothingham (1885–1972), Serbian humanitarian aid worker, women's rights activist, and nurse
- James Frothingham (1786–1864), an American portrait painter in Massachusetts and New York.
- John Frothingham (1788–1870), a Canadian merchant.
- Louis A. Frothingham (1871–1928), a United States Representative from Massachusetts.
- Nathaniel Langdon Frothingham (1793–1870), an American Unitarian minister and pastor of the First Church of Boston.
- Octavius Brooks Frothingham (1822–1895).
- Richard Frothingham Jr. (1812–1880), a Massachusetts historian, journalist, and politician.

== See also ==
- Frothingham v. Mellon, 262 U.S. 447 (1923), one of two consolidated cases decided by the Supreme Court of the United States in which the court rejected the concept of taxpayer standing.
