= Henry Bedel =

English divine

Henry Bedel (fl. 1571), was an English divine.

== Life ==
Bedel was a native of Oxfordshire. One Henry Bedel took the degree of B.A. at Corpus Christi College, Oxford, on 13 February 1555–6, and M.A. 1566 (Wood, Fasti Oxon. (Bliss), i. 146, 172). Wood is not certain, but it seems probable from the dates, that this graduate was identical with the preacher of the same name. Bedel was collated to the rectorship of St. Pancras, Soper Lane, on 4 October 1561, and preferred to the vicarship of Christ Church, London, on 28 January 1567. The latter living he resigned in 1576 (Newcourt, '"Rep".' i. 320, 519). While vicar of Christ Church he preached "a sermon exhorting to pity of the poor, which treatise may well be called the mouth of the poor". It was delivered on 15 November 1571 and published in 1573. Waterland praises it as "learned and elaborate". This is his only extant work, although Wood says that he was the author of other sermons. (Note: Tanner's Bibliotheca) (Note: Oxford University Register) (Note: Watt's Bibl. British)
