= Lucy McKim Garrison =

American song collector (1842–1877)

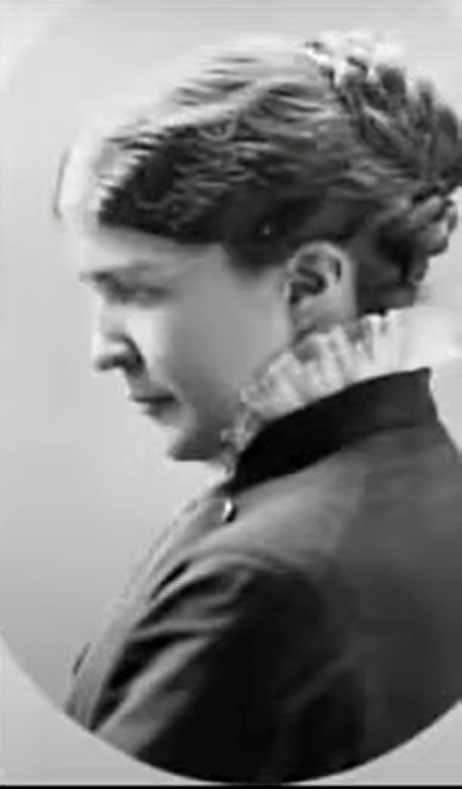
- Born: October 30, 1842; Philadelphia, Pennsylvania, U.S.
- Died: May 11, 1877 (aged 34); West Orange, New Jersey, U.S.
- Spouse: Wendell Phillips Garrison
- Children: 3
- Parent(s): Sarah Allibone (née Speakman) McKim and the Rev. James Miller McKim

Lucy McKim Garrison (October 30, 1842 – May 11, 1877) was an American song collector and co-editor of Slave Songs of the United States, together with William Francis Allen and Charles Pickard Ware.

== Early life ==
Lucy was born in Philadelphia, Pennsylvania, on October 30, 1842. She was a daughter of Sarah Allibone (née Speakman) McKim and the Rev. James Miller McKim, an antislavery lecturer and Presbyterian minister. Her younger brother was Charles Follen McKim, a prominent architect with the firm of McKim, Mead & White, and her maternal grandfather was Micajah Speakman of Chester County, Pennsylvania, whose home was a stop on the Underground Railroad.

== Poetry ==
She traveled to the Sea Islands of South Carolina with her father in 1862 while the Civil War was still raging, serving as his secretary as he gathered information on the conditions for newly freed slaves for the Philadelphia Port Royal Relief Committee. This exposed her to the music of former slaves just after they had been freed, a time of great social change. Her work in Port Royal, South Carolina, constitutes the first attempt to systematically describe the characteristics of African American spirituals. She published two songs, Poor Rosy, Poor and Roll, Jordon, Roll, they were the "earliest slave songs to be published complete with music".

== Personal life ==
On December 6, 1865, Lucy was married to Wendell Phillips Garrison (a son of the abolitionist William Lloyd Garrison) in Philadelphia. Together, they were the parents of:

- Lloyd McKim Garrison (1867–1900), who married Alice Kirkham in 1896. After his death she married Frederic Wait Lord.
- Philip McKim Garrison (1869–1935), who married Marian Knight. After his death, she married Hendon Chubb, son of Thomas Caldecot Chubb.
- Katherine McKim Garrison (1873–1948), who married banker Charles Dyer Norton, Assistant Secretary of the Treasury and Secretary to President William Howard Taft, in 1897.

Garrison died of heart disease after a long illness culminating in paralysis on May 11, 1877, in West Orange, New Jersey. She was survived by her husband and three children. Her story is told in a biography by musicologist Samuel Charters entitled, Songs of Sorrow: Lucy McKim Garrison and 'Slave Songs of the United States' .

== Legacy ==
From June 22, 2022 – March 24, 2025, Lucy McKim Garrison was featured in an exhibit, "Music HerStory: Women and Music of Social Change," at the National Museum of American History.
