= John D. Finnegan =

John D. Finnegan was the chief executive officer and chairman of Chubb Corporation from 2002 to 2016. His retirement occurred on December 31, 2016.

== Education ==
Finnegan attended Princeton University and graduated with a bachelor's degree in political science in 1971. In 1975, he received a law degree from Fordham Law School and a Master's in Business Administration from Rutgers University in 1976.

== Career ==
Finnegan began working at the General Motors Acceptance Corporation (now Ally Financial) in 1976, initially as a member of the tax staff before he transferred to GM's New York treasury office. In 1981, Finnegan held the position of Director of International Banking. By 1985, he had been given the position of Director of Strategic Planning and was transferred to GM's Detroit headquarters. Finnegan served as the president of GMAC from November 1997 to April 1999, and the executive vice president of General Motors until December 2002.

From December 2002 to 2016, Finnegan served as the president and chief executive officer of Chubb Corporation, and he served as its chairman beginning in December 2003.

=== Compensation ===
While CEO of Chubb in 2008, John D. Finnegan earned a total compensation of $12,557,105, which included a base salary of $1,275,000, a cash bonus of $3,357,800, and stocks granted of $7,718,690.
