= James H. Wakelin Jr. =

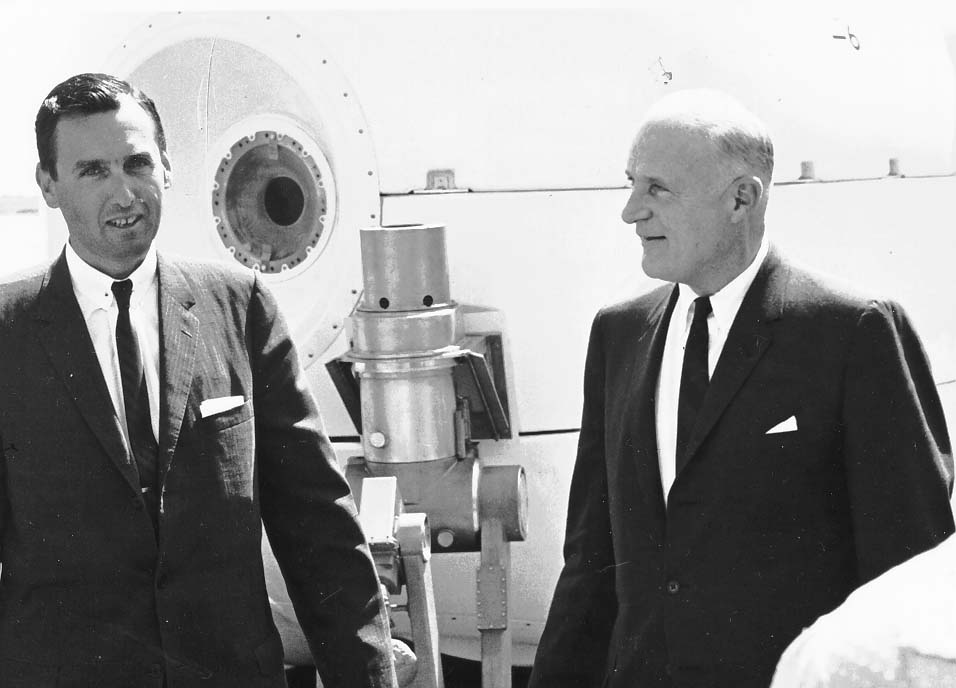
James H. Wakelin Jr. (right) at the commissioning of the DSV Alvin, June 5, 1964.

James Henry Wakelin Jr. (May 6, 1911 – December 21, 1990) was a United States physicist, oceanographer, and businessman who served as Assistant Secretary of the Navy (Research and Development) from 1959 to 1964.

== Early life and education ==
James H. Wakelin Jr. was born on May 6, 1911, in Holyoke, Massachusetts. After graduating from high school in 1928, Wakelin received an AB in physics from Dartmouth College in 1932; a BA in natural sciences from Cambridge University in 1934; an MA, also from Cambridge, in 1939; and a doctorate in physics from Yale University in 1940.

During 1939–1943, he was a senior physicist in the physical research department of the B.F. Goodrich Company in Akron, Ohio. Wakelin's work at B.F. Goodrich focused on the structure and physical properties of natural and synthetic rubber, and with X-ray diffraction and electron microscope studies of high polymers.

In 1943, Wakelin became an ordnance staff officer to the Coordinator of Research and Development of the United States Department of the Navy in Washington, D.C. In 1945, he joined the United States Navy's Office of Research and Inventions as head of the Chemistry, Mathematics, and Mechanics and Materials Sections of the Planning Division. In that role, he was active in the organization of the Office of Naval Research in 1946.

== Later life ==
Following the end of World War II, Wakelin and a number of his research colleagues from the Navy organized Engineering Research Associates, and Wakelin assumed the position of director of research. He also participated in Project SQUID at this time, under contract to Princeton University. In 1948, he left ERA to become associate director of Princeton's Textile Research Institute, and would go on to serve as the institute's director from 1951 to 1954.

In 1954, Wakelin formed a consulting firm, in which capacity he would go on to provide advice to General Electric's Lamp Division; the Stanford Research Institute; the American Radiator and Standard Sanitary Corporation; J.P. Stevens & Co.; the Frenchtown Porcelain Co.; and the Star Porcelain Co. Also in 1954, Wakelin was one of the founders of the Chesapeake Instrument Corporation, set up to conduct research and development for the United States Navy in the field of underwater acoustics.

In 1959, President of the United States Dwight D. Eisenhower appointed Wakelin as the first Assistant Secretary of the Navy (Research and Development) (the position had formerly been known as Assistant Secretary of the Navy (AIR), but that post had been re-tooled to focus on research and development during the tenure of Garrison Norton.) Wakelin served as Assistant Secretary of the Navy (Research and Development) from June 5, 1959, until June 30, 1964. In that capacity, he sought to encourage research into oceanography and attended international forums on the topic as head of the U.S. delegation.

On leaving the government, Wakelin became president of Research Analysis Corporation and served on the Board of Trustees of National Geographic Magazine.

In 1969, Wakelin returned to government service when President Richard Nixon appointed him head of the president's task force on oceanography. He then served for two years as Assistant Secretary of Commerce for Science and Technology.

Wakelin died of prostate cancer at his home in Washington, D.C., on December 21, 1990.

Government offices
Preceded by Garrison Norton (as Assistant Secretary of the Navy (AIR))	Assistant Secretary of the Navy; June 5, 1959 – June 30, 1964	Succeeded by Robert W. Morse
