= Frederick Lord =

Frederick or Frederic Lord may refer to:

- Frederick William Lord (1800–1860), American United States representative from New York
- Frederic Ives Lord (1897–1967), British pilot
- Frederic Lord (composer) (1886–1945), English choir director, teacher, organist, and composer
- Frederick Lord (Queensland politician) (1841–1914), member of the Queensland Legislative Assembly
- Frederick Lord (athlete) (1879–1928), British track and field athlete
- Frederic M. Lord (1912–2000), psychometrician
- Frederic Wait Lord (1871–1951), American energy executive and author
