= Chubb Fellowship =

Fellowship at Yale University

The Chubb Fellowship is a fellowship based and administered through Timothy Dwight College, one of Yale University's fourteen residential colleges, and is one of Yale's highest honors for a visiting lecturer. In 1936, Hendon Chubb established a fund for “…the encouragement and aid of students interested in government and public affairs.” In 1949, Chubb and the Master of Timothy Dwight College collaborated to create a visiting fellowship program as the principal means to achieve this goal.

== Past Fellows ==
There have been many nationally and internationally distinguished personalities who have been named as Chubb Fellows. They include many heads of state, other national and international political leaders, Nobel and Pulitzer prize winners, and a wide range of highly accomplished individuals in business, non-profit management and the arts. Following is the list.

=== 2010s ===
1. Samantha Power
2. Leymah Gbowee
3. Wendell Berry
4. Leonel Fernández
5. Aung San Suu Kyi
6. Shah Rukh Khan
7. Morgan Freeman
8. Nicholas Kristof
9. John DeStefano Jr.
10. Susan Rice
11. Norman Mineta
12. Paul Simon

=== 2000s ===
1. Carlos Fuentes
2. Chinua Achebe
3. Tzipi Livni
4. Robert Farris Thompson
5. Ellen Johnson Sirleaf
6. Wynton Marsalis
7. Ted Sorensen
8. Matt Hughes
9. Cesar Pelli
10. Rita Dove
11. Gloria Steinem
12. Steve Reich
13. Elie Wiesel
14. Christine Brennan
15. Harry Belafonte
16. Sofia Coppola
17. Frank Gehry
18. David Halberstam
19. Richard Pound
20. Mikhail Baryshnikov
21. Richard Leakey
22. Ruth Simmons
23. Edward James Olmos
24. Eddie Palmieri
25. Mel Martinez
26. Gary Locke
27. Tadao Ando
28. George Pataki
29. Yevgeny Yevtushenko
30. George H. W. Bush

=== 1990s ===
1. Tito Puente
2. Judith Rodin
3. George Pataki
4. H.E. Dr. Oscar Arias Sanchez
5. Joseph Lieberman
6. R.W. Apple
7. John G. Rowland
8. Curtis Hanson
9. Phil Gramm
10. Henry Louis Gates
11. Lord David Wilson of Tillyorn
12. Jack Kemp
13. Shimon Peres
14. Dr. Zbigniew Brzezinski
15. Richard Hayward
16. Norman Mailer
17. John Rowland
18. Wilma Mankiller
19. Harry A. Blackmun
20. Walter Cronkite
21. Rudolph Giuliani
22. Christine Todd Whitman
23. Jean Bertrand Aristide
24. David N. Dinkins
25. Sylvia Temkin
26. Dr. Benny Temkin
27. John F. Kerry
28. Cardinal Jean-Marie Lustiger
29. Hans Brunhart
30. Sebastiao Salgado
31. Andre Milongo
32. Lowell P. Weicker
33. Richard M. Daley
34. Willie Colon
35. Octavio Paz
36. Fernando Collor de Mello
37. Chai Ling

=== 1980s ===
1. Toni Morrison
2. Amine Gemayel
3. Robert T. Matsui
4. Mario Vargas Llosa
5. Edward Kennedy
6. Rafael Hernandez Colon
7. Hanif Kureishi
8. Thomas Eagleton
9. Patricia Schroeder
10. Randall Robinson
11. Ntozake Shange
12. David Steel
13. Mieczyslaw Maneli
14. Boleslaw Wierzbianski
15. Joanna Rostropowicz Clark
16. Michael Kaufman
17. William Styron
18. Jerzy Kosinski
19. Irving Kristol
20. Raúl Alfonsín
21. Moshe Arens
22. Henry Cisneros
23. Simon Wiesenthal
24. Peter Ueberroth
25. Bruce Babbitt
26. Richard Thornburgh
27. Betty Frieda
28. Mario Cuomo
29. Nicole Hollander
30. Amhadou Ahidjo
31. Robert McNamara
32. Jesse Jackson
33. Wole Soyinka
34. Jerzy Milewski
35. Bruce Morrison
36. Teddy Kolek
37. Norman Mailer
38. Matodja Gazon
39. Alexander Haig
40. Shirley Ann Williams
41. Buchi Emecheta
42. Paule Marshall
43. Alice Walker
44. Walter Mondale
45. John Lehman
46. Sol Linowitz
47. Lord Killanin
48. Harry A. Blackmun
49. Moshe Dayan
50. John Kenneth Galbraith

=== 1970s ===
1. Robert Redford
2. Moshe Dayan
3. Gary Hart
4. Jack Kemp
5. Shirley Temple
6. Nancy Landon Kassebaum
7. Edward I. Koch
8. Abraham A. Ribicoff
9. Vernon E. Jordan
10. Henry M. Jackson
11. Santiago Carrillo, Secretary General of the Communist Party of Spain, 1977–78
12. Kenneth A. Gibson, Mayor of Newark 1977–78
13. Edward H. Levi, U.S. Attorney General; president, The University of Chicago, 1976–77
14. Gerald R. Ford, President of the U.S.; Vice-President of the U.S.; U.S. Congressman, 1976–77
15. George H.W. Bush, 41st President of the U.S.; Vice-President of the U.S.; CIA Director, 1976–77
16. Morris K. Udall, U.S. Congressman; Charman, Committee of Interior and Insular Affairs, 1976–77
17. Michael Harrington, Socialist Writer, 1976–77
18. Reubin O'D. Askew, Governor of Florida, 1976–77
19. Charles McCurdy Mathias, U.S. Senator, 1975–76
20. Ella T. Grasso, Governor of Connecticut, 1975–76
21. Daniel Patrick Moynihan, U.S. Permanent Representative to the U.N.; U.S. Senator, 1975–76
22. James R. Schlesinger, Secretary of Defense, 1975–76
23. Joseph Biden, U.S. Senator, 1975–76
24. Mario Soares, Secretary General of the Socialist Party of Portugal; Prime Minister of Portugal, 1975–76
25. David L. Boren, Governor of Oklahoma; U.S. Senator, 1975–76
26. Edward Heath, former Prime Minister of the United Kingdom, 1975–76
27. Maynard Jackson, Mayor of Atlanta, 1974–75
28. Hubert H. Humphrey, Vice President of the United States; U.S. Senator, 1974–75
29. F. Bradford Morse, U.S. Congressman; Under Secretary General, The United Nations, 1974–75
30. Jimmy Carter, President of the United States; Governor of Georgia, 1974–75
31. John V. Lindsay, U.S. Congressman; Mayor of New York City, 1974–75
32. Thomas O. Enders, Assistant Secretary of State; Ambassador from the U.S. to Canada, 1974–75
33. Benjamin C. Bradlee, Executive Editor, The Washington Post, 1974–75
34. Samuel Archibald, Conference on Film and Politics, 1973–74
35. Thomas Patterson, Conference on Film and Politics, 1973–74
36. Charles Guggenheim, Conference on Film and Politics, 1973–74
37. Emile de Antonio, Conference on Film and Politics, 1973–74
38. William Taylor, Conference on Film and Politics, 1973–74
39. Elliot Lee Richardson, Secretary, H.E.W.; Secretary of Defense, U.S. Attorney General, 1973–74
40. Jesse Jackson, Civil Rights Leader; Director, Operation PUSH, 1973–74
41. Sam J. Ervin, Jr., U.S. Senator, 1973–74
42. Les Aspin, U.S. Congressman; Chairman, House Armed Services Committee, 1973–74
43. Marya Mannes, Writer, 1973–74
44. Alan S. Paton, Writer; President of the South African Liberal Party, 1972–73
45. Edward R. Roybal, U.S. Congressman, 1972–73
46. Ralph Nader, Consumer Advocate, 1972–73
47. Bob Eckhardt, U.S. Congressman, 1972–73
48. William Benton, U.S. Senator; Publisher of Encyclopædia Britannica, 1972–73
49. Lowell Weicker, U.S. Congressman, Senator, 1972–73
50. Yvonne Brathwaite Burke, U.S. Congresswoman, 1972–73
51. Willard Gaylin, Conference on the Works of B.F. Skinner, 1971–72
52. Andrew Greeley, Conference on the Works of B.F. Skinner, 1971–72
53. Zbigniew Brzezinski, Conference on the Works of B.F. Skinner, 1971–72
54. Alain Enthoven, Conference on the Works of B.F. Skinner, 1971–72
55. D.W. Brogan, Conference on the Works of B.F. Skinner, 1971–72
56. Brand Blanchard, Conference on the Works of B.F. Skinner, 1971–72
57. Paul Ricoeur, Conference on the Works of B.F. Skinner, 1971–72
58. Rollo May, Conference on the Works of B.F. Skinner, 1971–72
59. Stephen Spender, Conference on the Works of B.F. Skinner, 1971–72
60. B.F. Skinner, Conference on the Works of B.F. Skinner, 1971–72
61. Sir John Masterman, Writer, 1971–72
62. Charles D. Diggs, Jr.U.S. Congressman, 1971–72
63. Anthony Lake, Conference on the Presidency, 1971–72
64. Joseph Califano, Conference on the Presidency, 1971–72
65. Arthur Schlesinger, Conference on the Presidency, 1971–72
66. Eugene Rostow, Conference on the Presidency, 1971–72
67. Beth Corona, Civil Rights Leader, 1970–71
68. Kate Millet, Writer, 1970–71
69. George Ball, Undersecretary of State, 1970–71
70. Charles Evers, Mayor of Fayette, Mississippi, 1970–71
71. Bayard Rustin, Civil Rights Leader; Director, A. Phillipe Randolph Institute, 1970–71
72. John Henrik Clark, Conference on the Black Woman, 1970–71
73. Gwendolyn Brooks, Conference on the Black Woman, 1970–71
74. Shirley Graham DeBois, Conference on the Black Woman, 1970–71
75. Maya Angelou, Conference on the Black Woman, 1970–71

=== 1960s ===
1. Sir William Armstrong, Head of the British Civil Service 1969–70
2. Dr. Edwin H. Land, President of Polaroid Corporation 1969–70
3. Richard D. McCarthy, U.S. Congressman 1969–70
4. Carl B. Stokes, Mayor of Cleveland 1968–69
5. James Farmer, Director of Congress Racial Equality; Assistant Secretary, HEW 1968–69
6. George H.W. Bush41st President of the U.S.; Vice-President of the U.S.; CIA Director 1968–69
7. C. N. Annadurai, Chief Minister of Madras 1967–68
8. Theodore R. McKeldin, Mayor of Baltimore 1967–68
9. Robert Taft, U.S. Congressman; U.S. Senator 1967–68
10. Ronald Reagan, President of the U.S.; Governor of California 1967–68
11. John V. Tunney, U.S. Congressman; U.S. Senator 1966–67
12. Jonathan B. Bingham, U.S. Congressman 1966–67
13. Richard C. Lee, Mayor of New Haven 1966–67
14. Robert Smylie, Governor of Idaho 1966–67
15. Lt. General Sir John Bago Glubb 1966–67
16. Robert Wagner, Mayor of New York City 1965–66
17. Lord Head, High Commissioner, Malaysia 1965–66
18. Richard Bolling, U.S. Congressman 1965–66
19. Henry Luce, Publisher, Time Inc. 1964–65
20. John Chafee, Governor of Rhode Island 1964–65
21. Terry Sanford, Governor of North Carolina 1964–65
22. Joseph S. Clark, U.S. Senator 1963–64
23. Thomas Ludlow Ashley, U.S. Congressman 1963–64
24. Robert do Oliveira Campos, Ambassador from Brazil to the U.S. 1963–64
25. John Lindsay, U.S. Congressman; Mayor of New York City 1962–63
26. Sir Richard Allen, Ambassador from United Kingdom to Burma 1962–63
27. Joseph Grimond, M.P., House of Commons; Leader of Liberal Party 1962–63
28. Jess Unruh, Speaker of the California Assembly 1962–63
29. Barry Goldwater, U.S. Senator; Republican candidate for president, 1964 1961–62
30. Arnold D. P. Heeney, Ambassador from Canada to the U.S. 1961–62
31. John Sherman Cooper, U.S. Senator 1961–62
32. Sir Charles P. Snow, Novelist, Educator and Scientist 1961–62
33. Dr. Hastings Banda, Chairman, Malawi Congress Party; President of Malawi 1960–61
34. Sir Henry Willink, Master, Magdalene College, Cambridge 1960–61
35. Ralph McGill, Publisher and Editor, The Atlanta Constitution 1960–61
36. Herbert Matthews, New York Times correspondent 1960–61

=== 1950s ===
1. Koichiro Asakai, Ambassador from Japan to the U.S., 1959–60
2. Sir Leslie Munro, Permanent Representative of New Zealand to the U.N., 1959–60
3. Edmund S. Muskie, U.S. Senator, 1959–60
4. Herbert Brownell Jr., U.S. Attorney General, 1959–60
5. Stephen M. Young, U.S. Senator, 1959–60
6. Adlai E. Stevenson Governor of Illinois; Democratic candidate for president, 1952 & 1956, 1958–59
7. Sir Harold Caccia, Ambassador from United Kingdom to U.S., 1958–59
8. John Martin Vorys, U.S. Congressman, 1958–59
9. Dr. Najib-Ullah, Ambassador from Afghanistan to U.S., 1958–59
10. Prescott Bush, U.S. Senator, 1958–59
11. G. Mennen Williams, Governor of Michigan, 1957–58
12. Harry S. Truman, President of the United States, 1957–58
13. Raymond E. Baldwin, U.S. Senator; Justice of Supreme Court of Errors, Connecticut, 1957–58
14. Walter J. Kohler, Governor of Wisconsin, 1957–58
15. Dennis W. Brogan, British Political Scientist, 1957–58
16. Chester Bowles, Governor of Connecticut, 1956–57
17. Clement Richard, Earl Attlee, Prime Minister, United Kingdom, 1956–57
18. Harry P. Cain, U.S. Senator, 1956–57
19. Hermini Portell-Vila, Historian, 1956–57
20. William A. Robson, British Political Scientist, 1956–57
21. Charles M. Spofford, Chairman, NATO Council of Ministers, 1955–56
22. John A. Costello, Prime Minister of Ireland, 1955–56
23. Frank P. Graham, U.S. Senator; United Nations Mediator, 1955–56
24. Arthur H. Dean, U.S. Ambassador to Korea, 1954–55
25. Roger N. Baldwin, Chairman, National Committee of American Civil Liberties Union, 1954–55
26. Dean Acheson, U.S. Secretary of State, 1954–55
27. Hugh Gregg, Governor of New Hampshire, 1954–55
28. Brendan Gill, Editor, The New Yorker, 1954–55
29. Leslie C. Stevens, Vice-Admiral (USN), Naval Attach, 1953–54
30. T.V. Smith, U.S. Congressman, 1953–54
31. Stephen K. Bailey, Mayor of Middletown, CT, 1953–54
32. Abraham A. Ribicoff, U.S. Senator, 1952–53
33. Edward Weeks, Editor, The Atlantic Monthly, 1952–53
34. Richardson Dilworth, Mayor of Philadelphia, 1952–53
35. David Riesman, Social Scientist, 1952–53
36. John Alsop, Connecticut Legislator, 1951–52
37. Arthur Koestler, Writer, 1951–52
38. Ernest K. Lindley, Washington Editor, Newsweek, 1951–52
39. Richard Rovere, Columnist, The New Yorker, 1950–51
40. Paul H. Appleby, Professor, Public Administration, 1950–51
41. James W. Clise, Vice President of National Municipal League of New York City, 1950–51
42. Silliman Evans, Newspaper Publisher, 1950–51
43. Charles W. Eliot, Planning Consultant, 1950–51

=== 1940s ===
1. Newbold Morris, president, New York City Council, 1949–50
2. Russell Lynes, Editor, Harper's Magazine, 1949–50
3. Lewis Mumford, Planner, Writer, 1949–50
4. Louis Brownlow, Public Administration Clearing House, 1949–50
