= Nathaniel Langdon Frothingham =

American Unitarian minister and pastor

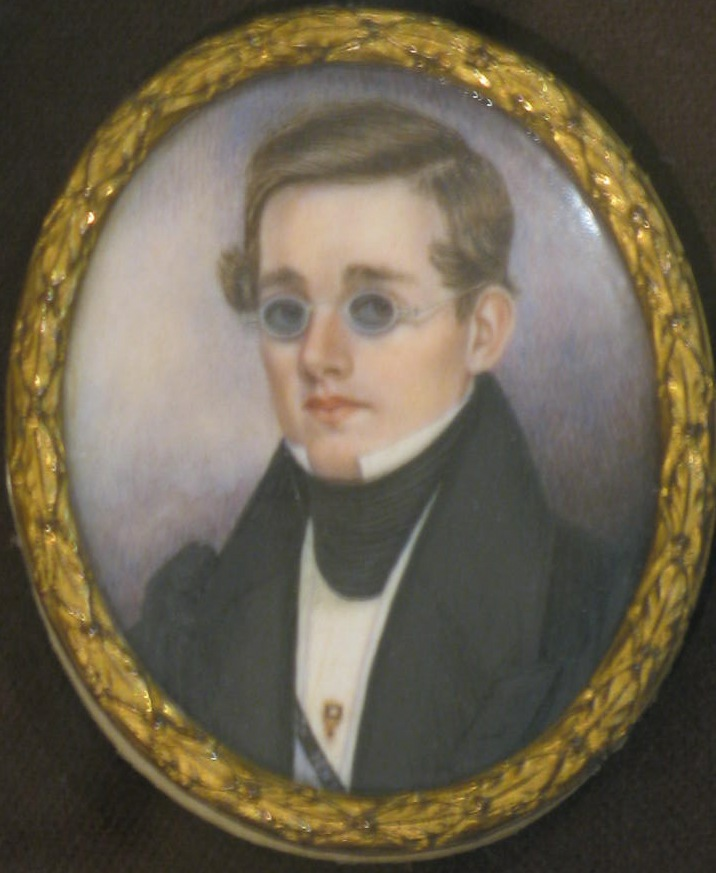

Nathaniel Langdon Frothingham (23 July 1793 – 3 April 1870) was an American Unitarian minister and pastor of the First Church of Boston from 1815 to 1850. Frothingham was opposed to Theodore Parker and the interjection of transcendentalism into the church. He also wrote sermons, hymns, and poetry.

== Early life ==
Nathaniel Langdon Frothingham was born on July 23, 1793, in Boston, Massachusetts the son of Ebenezer Frothingham and Joanna Langdon. He attended Boston Latin School under the charge of Samuel Hunt. He graduated from Harvard College in 1811 at the age of eighteen and gave a commencement speech entitled "The Cultivation of the Taste and Imagination," which was described by Dr. Pierce as "written with purity and pronounced with elegance."

== Career ==
In 1812, Frothingham became the first Instructor of Rhetoric and Oratory at Harvard.

On March 15, 1815, Frothingham became an ordained Minister of the First Church in Boston. He remained there until March 1850.

Frothingham had been five years in the pulpit when the Unitarian controversy broke out. The American Unitarian Association was formed in 1825. In March 1835, the twentieth anniversary of his settlement in the First Church, he preached:

This is known by the name of the Unitarian controversy; and in so Darning it I believe that I am giving utterance, for the first time in this desk, to that party word. This alone is saying not a little in illustration of the spirit with which the offices of religion have been here conducted. ... We remained almost at rest in that earthquake of schism. ... We silently assumed the ground, or rather found ourselves standing upon it, that there was no warrant in the Scriptures for the idea of a threefold personality in the divine nature; or for that of atonement, according to the popular understanding of that word; or for that of man's total corruption and inability; or for that of an eternity of woe adjudged as the punishment of earthly offences; or indeed for any of the peculiar articles in that scheme of faith which went under the name of the Genevan reformer. ... We have made more account of the religious sentiment than of theological opinions.

The dependence was on miracle. Frothingham said, in a sermon on the "Manifestation of Christ":

Is there one there, who thinks he requires no miraculous evidence in support of his religious convictions, who feels satisfied with the proofs that the unaided mind can furnish for itself? I will not assail him, I will not charge him with throwing away all faith, because he is willing to receive it on slighter grounds than we trust it is built on. I will congratulate him that he feels his hope to be so sure ... But let us profess for ourselves, that we needed something more and have found it. We will own all that we love to trace our faith further than to the self-taught dictates of a defined intellect and an elevated heart; even to the Fountain of Inspiration.

In a sermon entitled "The Ruffian Released", preached in 1836, he said:

I am at a loss to account for it, I scarcely know on what principle of human nature it is to be explained, this sympathy of well-meaning persons with those who have outraged every feeling of humanity by their savage force or their cold hearted depravity. I can understand how the Jewish populace in an excited hour should demand the liberation of Barabbas; I can almost enter into the feelings of those who, in a season of great depression, should empty every convict's cell, saying, let us supplicate the holy and frowning heavens together, for we are all transgressors alike. But, in a state of society like our own, with institutions so free from abuse and so full of mercifulness, it is hard to comprehend why there should be such a feverish sensibility in favor of the abandoned, and so intense a wish for something better than the laws.

He disagreed with the philosophy of Les Misérables, Victor Hugo's famous novel, which seemed to imply that a change of outward conditions would effect a change of character, that the social arrangement was radically wrong, and that the "paralysis of the person" was contingent on "the narrowness of the lot", which ran counter to his beliefs.

The following is from Parker's journal:

August, 1857. I had a letter from Dr. Frothingham today. The sight of that man's handwriting is Parnassian. Nothing vulgar is connected with his name, but on the contrary every remembrance of wit and learning and contempt of cant. In our Olympic games we love his fame. But that fame was bought by many years of steady rejection of all that is popular with our society, and a persevering study of books which none else reads, and which he can convert to no temporary purpose. There is a scholar doing a scholar's office.

Frothingham was elected a Fellow of the American Academy of Arts and Sciences in 1856. He corresponded with Ralph Waldo Emerson, and was a thorough student of the German language when such scholarship was rare in America.

== Family ==
In 1818, Frothingham married Ann Gorham Brooks, daughter of Peter Chardon Brooks and sister of the wives of Edward Everett and Charles Francis Adams, Sr.

They had three children, all born in Boston. Octavius Brooks Frothingham was born November 26, 1822, and became an author. Ward Brooks Frothingham was born November 16, 1828, and resided for a time in Burlington, serving in two town offices. Ellen Frothingham was born March 25, 1835, and became a translator (German into English).

Ann Frothingham died on July 4, 1864, in Burlington, Massachusetts.

== Illness ==
In the summer of 1826, Frothingham was afflicted by weekly violent headaches.

In 1859, on a third foreign tour of eighteen months, in Europe with his wife and daughters, Frothingham first became aware of a defect in his vision. He could not enjoy picture-galleries, and saw distorted figures and blurred colors. He consulted oculists in Paris and London, but no disease was visible in his eyes. When he returned home in the autumn of 1860, the dimness had increased.

In 1865, he underwent an unsuccessful operation on his eyes and became totally blind. His disease was of the nature of glaucoma and was incurable.

== Work ==
=== Sermons ===
- Deism Or Christianity? Four Discourses, Kessinger Publishing, LLC, (1845) reprint (March 4, 2009), ISBN 978-1-104-11612-5
- Two Hundred Years Ago: A Sermon Preached to the First Church, on the Close of Their Second Century, 1830, Printed for the Society
- God with the Aged: A Sermon Preached to the First Church, Jan. 7, 1849, J. Wilson, 1849.
- Christian Patriotism: A Sermon, on the Occasion of the Death of John Adams, Munroe and Francis, 1826.
- Sermons in the Order of a Twelvemonth, 1852.

=== Hymns ===
- "60R O You Whose Presence Glows In All", Hymns of the Spirits Three

=== Poetry ===
In the introduction to a translation of the first of the Elegies of Propertius, a writer in the Augustan Age of Roman poetry, Frothingham says:

The last, which is, indeed, the leading, reason [for presenting the version] is the opportunity that it gives of comparing some of the purest sentiments of classical antiquity respecting the state of the dead, with those of the simplest minds that have the advantage of Christian education.

- Xenia epigram
- "The Crossed Swords", Edmund Clarence Stedman, ed. An American Anthology, 1787–1900, 1900
- Nathaniel Langdon Frothingham (1855). Metrical Pieces: translated and original. Crosby, Nichols.
- "Sartor Resartus", Christian Examiner for September, 1836, N. L. Frothingham.
