= Mishaum Point =

Coordinates: 41°31′25″N 70°57′13″W

Mishaum Point is a peninsula in Bristol County in southeastern Massachusetts. Mishaum Point is a private gated area. It extends about 1 mile into Buzzards Bay.
