= Frederic Wait Lord =

American energy executive and author

- Born: July 3, 1871; Brooklyn, New York
- Died: December 31, 1951 (aged 80); New York Hospital, New York
- Education: Massachusetts Institute of Technology
- Spouse: Alice Kirkham Garrison (m. 1906; died 1951)
- Children: 3
- Parent(s): Joseph Lord; Mary Ann Archer

Frederic Wait Lord (July 3, 1871 – December 31, 1951) was an American energy executive and author.

== Early life ==
Lord was born on July 3, 1871, in Brooklyn, New York. He was a son of Joseph Lord (1832–1880) and Mary Ann (née Archer) Lord (1840–1925). Among his siblings were Dr. Sidney Archer Lord, Ernest Archer Lord, and Genevieve (née Lord) Frothingham (wife of Edgar Vietor Frothingham).

Lord was educated at the Massachusetts Institute of Technology, serving as captain of its track team in 1893.

== Career ==
Although entered in the 110 high metres hurdles, he did not compete at the 1896 Athens Olympics.

Lord established the Lord Electric Company in Boston, Massachusetts in 1895. The company was "known throughout the United States for its important electrical work in great projects such as La Guardia Field and Idlewild." He served as president of Lord Electric, as well as Lord Manufacturing Co. and Lord Construction Co., until his retirement in 1948. The company later expanded to Puerto Rico, where it operated since 1959 as a subsidiary of Lord Electric Company.

An honorary member of the New York Electrical Contractors Association, he was the author of three books, Ethics of Contracting and Stabilizing of Profits, the Selective Method of Letting Contracts, and Contracting as a Profession.

== Personal life ==
On July 29, 1906, Lord was married to Alice (née Kirkham) Garrison (1875–1959) at Hastings-on-Hudson, New York. The widow of Lloyd McKim Garrison (eldest son of Wendell Phillips Garrison), she was a daughter of Augustus Kirkham and Clarinda Harrison (née Dunham) Kirkham. After their marriage, her brother, Edward Kirkham, began working for Lord. From her first marriage, she was the mother of Lloyd Kirkman Garrison (an attorney who represented physicist J. Robert Oppenheimer in the 1950s) and Clarinda Kirkham (née Garrison) Binger (who married Dr. Carl Binger). Together, they lived at 238 East 68th Street, and were the parents of three daughters, including:

- Anne Kirkham Lord (1908–2000), a twin who married landscape architect Wolcott Erskine Andrews, son of Martin Andrews, in 1937.
- Mary Archer "Polly" Lord (1908–1998), a twin who married Charles Merriman Du Puy Reed, son of William Ebenezer Reed. They later divorced.
- Ellen Wait Lord (1909–1984), who married Robert Gordon Pierce, a banker with Dry Dock Savings Bank who was a son of Gordon Pierce, in 1937.

Lord died on December 31, 1951, at New York Hospital in New York City. His widow died at her summer home at Black Point near New London, Connecticut in July 1959.
