= Xenia motif =

Roman mosaic motif

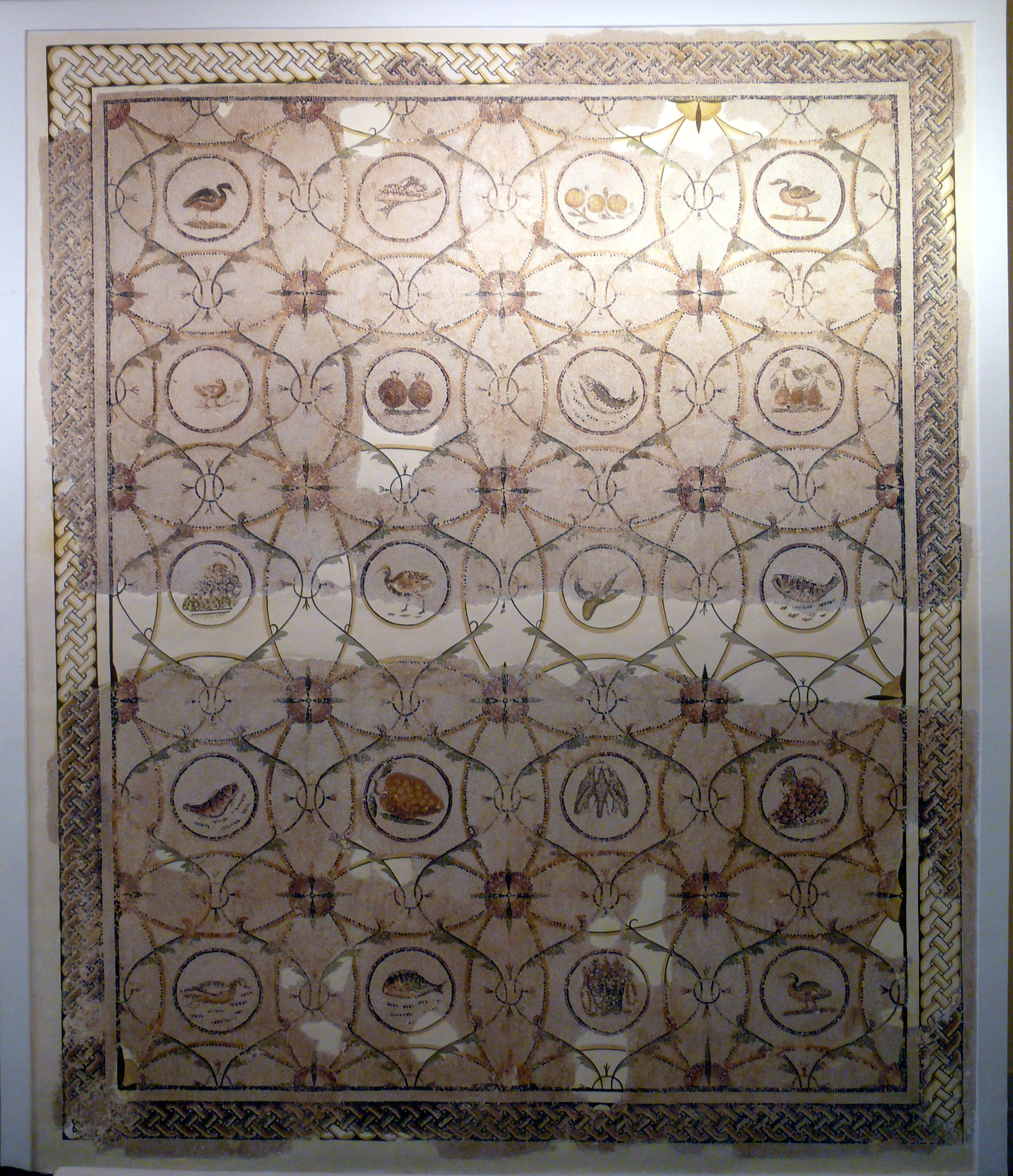
Xenia items in compartments, Sousse Museum

The xenia motif in Roman mosaic and fresco painting is a still life motif consisting of a grouping of various items, mostly edible, representing a generous offering (a xenia) from a wealthy host to guests. The items are often spread across different compartments in floor mosaic schemes. No doubt there were once paintings, but these have been lost.

Typical elements of a xenia motif include game hanging from hooks, fish, baskets of fruit (often overturned), and the like. Vitruvius lists specifically "poultry, eggs, vegetables, and other country produce".

Xenia motifs are typically found in reception rooms.

The word xenia is Greek, and means hospitality; in Latin, it came to mean presents for guests, and later presents in general. It also came to include xenia epigrams.

== Xenia epigrams ==
A xenia epigram is an epigram commemorating hospitality or attached to a gift, sometimes represented in a xenia mosaic. Originally found in Latin literature, it was revived in the nineteenth century.

The 13th book of Martial's epigrams is entitled Xenia, and catalogs the foods that might be given to a departing guest at the Saturnalia.

=== Example ===
Accept and wear this constant flower,

Thus copied out by art.

It blooms in Nature but its hour,--

For ever in the heart.

Affections into habits grown,--

Lives fastened in one lot,--

The flower has strengthened into stone

We name "Forget me not."
