= Thomas Caldecot Chubb =

American businessperson

Thomas Caldecot Chubb (14 November 1834 – 10 August 1887) was an English-born American founder of Chubb & Son.

== Early life ==
Chubb was born on 14 November 1834 in London. He was a son of John and Sarah Chubb of St Pancras, Soper Lane, London.

== Career ==
In 1882 Chubb and his son, Percy, opened a marine underwriting business in the seaport district of New York City. They collected $1,000 each from 100 prominent merchants to start their venture, initially focusing on insuring ships and cargoes. After his death in 1887, Percy took over as head of the firm and his youngest son, Hendon, became a partner in 1895. Percy also founded Federal Insurance Company. His eldest son, Sidney, was also a partner until retiring in 1921 and moving to California, then Paris. After Percy's death in 1930, Hendon became senior partner, serving in that role until his retirement in 1959.

== Personal life ==
In 1855, Chubb married Victoria Edds (1833–1917), a daughter of William Edds. Together, they were the parents of:

- Sidney Caldecot Chubb (1856–1930), who married Mary Eugenia Ely, a daughter of Eugene Ely of Union County, New Jersey, in 1886.
- Percy Chubb (1857–1930), who married Helen Low, a daughter of Charles Adolphe Low of California, in 1888.
- Mabel Ada Victoria Chubb (1862–1930), who married Dr. Robert Holmes Greene, son of Benjamin Greene, a prominent cotton manufacturer in Brunswick, Maine.
- Hendon Chubb (1874–1960), who married Alice Margaret Lee in 1897. After her death, he married Marian (née Knight) Garrison, daughter-in-law of Wendell Phillips Garrison.

Chubb died in Smithtown on Long Island on 10 August 1887. He was buried in the churchyard of the Episcopal church in St. James, New York. His widow died in Manhattan in April 1917. In 1924, his son Hendon created the Victoria Foundation, named in honor of his late mother. Today, it "is one of the oldest private foundations in America."

=== Descendants ===
Through his youngest son Hendon, he was posthumously a grandfather of Thomas Caldecot Chubb (1899–1972); Alice "Margaret" Chubb (1901–1976), who married J. Russell Parsons, a partner with Chubb & Son; and Percy Chubb II (1909–1982), who married Corinne Roosevelt Alsop (a daughter of Corinne (née Robinson) Alsop Cole, and Joseph Wright Alsop IV).
