= Thoughts on African Colonization =

1832 anti-slavery treatise

Thoughts on African Colonization (Note: Full title: Thoughts on African Colonization, or an Impartial Exhibition of the Doctrines, Principles and Purposes of the American Colonization Society, together with the Resolutions, Addresses and Remonstrances of the Free People of Color) is a treatise by William Lloyd Garrison criticizing the American Colonization Society and segregation as immoral and improper.

It was published in 1832 at Garrison's and Knapp's publishing company in Boston's Merchants Hall. It describes the American Colonization Society's goals as being too sympathetic to slavers, and called for immediate emancipation of enslaved people. This later influenced more radical anti-slavery reformers in the United States.

"Whatever may be the result of this great controversy, I shall have the consolation of believing that no efforts were lacking, on my part, to uproot the prejudices of my countrymen, to persuade them to walk in the path of duty and shun the precipice of expediency, to undo the heavy burdens and let the oppressed go free at once, to warn them of the danger of expelling the people of color from their native land, and to convince them of the necessity of abandoning a dangerous and chimerical, as well as unchristian and anti-republican association. For these efforts I have hitherto suffered reproach and persecution, must expect to suffer, and am willing to suffer to the end."
