= Ellen Frothingham =

US translator of German literature

Ellen Frothingham (25 March 1835 – 1902) worked in the United States as a translator of German-language works into English.

== Biography ==
She was born in Boston, the daughter of Nathaniel Frothingham. She studied German literature and was well known for her translations into English of Lessing's Nathan der Weise (Kuno Fischer's edition; New York, 1868), Goethe's Hermann und Dorothea (1870), Berthold Auerbach's Edelweiss (1871), Lessing's Laokoon (1874), and Franz Grillparzer's Sappho (1876).

== Sources ==
- Gilman, D. C.; Peck, H. T.; Colby, F. M., eds. (1906). "Frothingham, Ellen" . New International Encyclopedia (1st ed.). New York: Dodd, Mead.
- Wilson, J. G.; Fiske, J., eds. (1900). "Frothingham, Nathaniel Langdon" . Appletons' Cyclopædia of American Biography. New York: D. Appleton.
- "Frothingham%2C%20Ellen%2C%201835%2D1902 | the Online Books Page".
