= St Pancras, Soper Lane =

Coordinates: 51°30′47.5″N 0°5′31″W

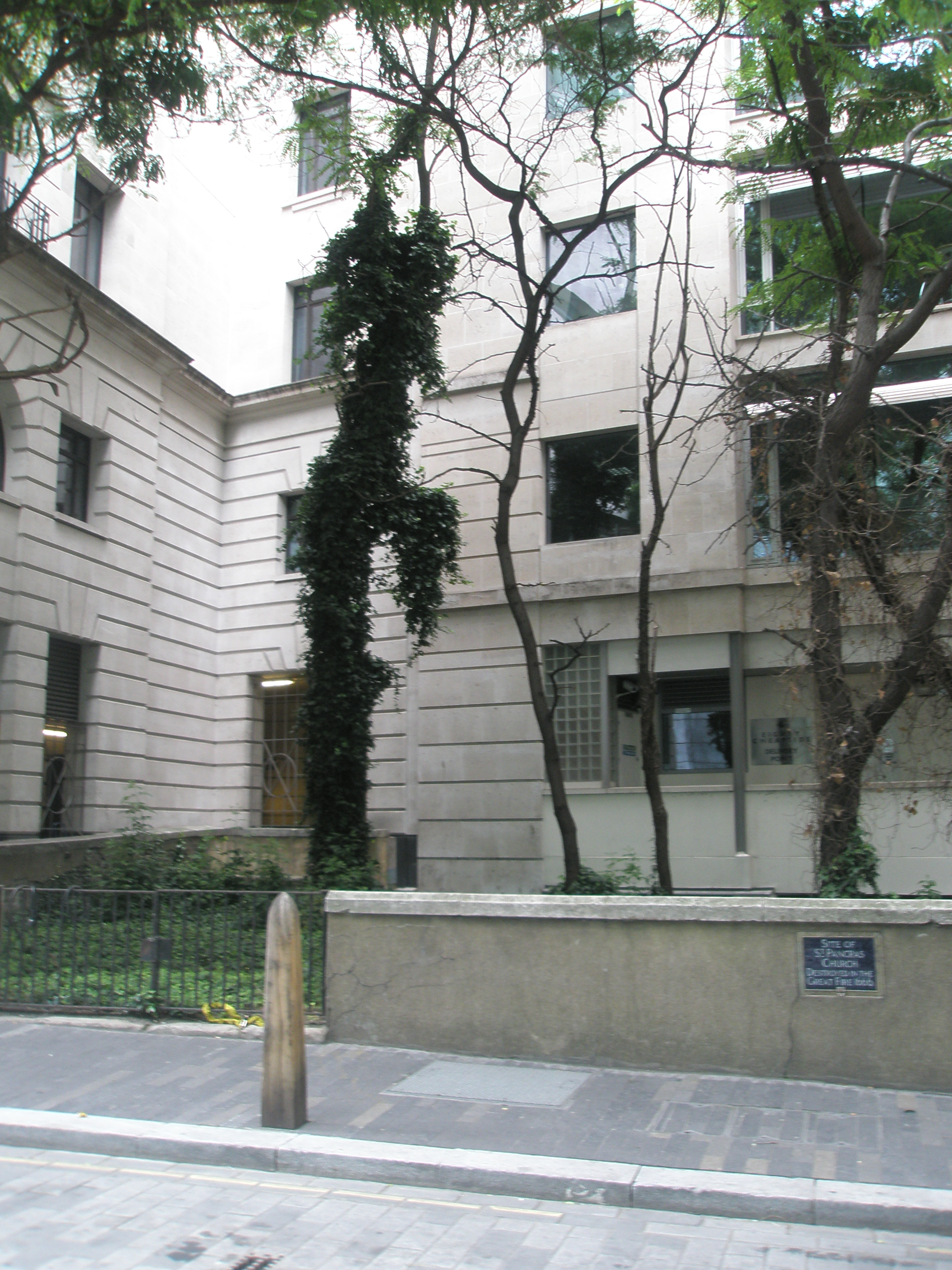
- 2008 photo of site
- St Pancras, Soper Lane
- Location: Pancras Lane
- Country: England
- Denomination: Church of England

Architecture
- Demolished: 1666

St Pancras, Soper Lane, was a parish church in the City of London, in England. Of medieval origin, it was destroyed in the Great Fire of London in 1666 and not rebuilt.

== History ==
St Pancras, Soper Lane, was in the Ward of Cheap, City of London. The street from which it took its name was renamed after the Great Fire, although sources vary as to whether it became Queen Street or Pancras Lane. The church was first built in the twelfth century. It was a small building, with a tower containing five bells. There was a chapel on the north side.

Though small, the parish had some wealthy residents, and the church received various benefactions. In 1617 it was presented with a monument commemorating Elizabeth I by Thomas Chapman. In 1621 the renovation of the building was financed by a group of benefactors, including Chapman, and a porch was added in 1624, paid for by Chapman's son.

The patronage of the church belonged to the prior and chapter of Christ Church, Canterbury, until 1365, when they granted it to the Archbishop of Canterbury. There was a parsonage house on the corner of Pancras Lane and Queen Street; in 1670 it was leased out for 40 years, at an annual rent of £2.

== Destruction ==
Along with the majority of churches in the City, St Pancras, Soper Lane, was destroyed in the Great Fire of London in September 1666. It was not rebuilt; instead the parish was united with those of St Mary-le-Bow and All Hallows, Honey Lane. The rebuilt St Mary-le-Bow served as the church for the united parishes, and the site of St Pancras was retained as a graveyard.
