= Llewellyn Park =

Populated place in Essex County, New Jersey, US

- Census-designated place
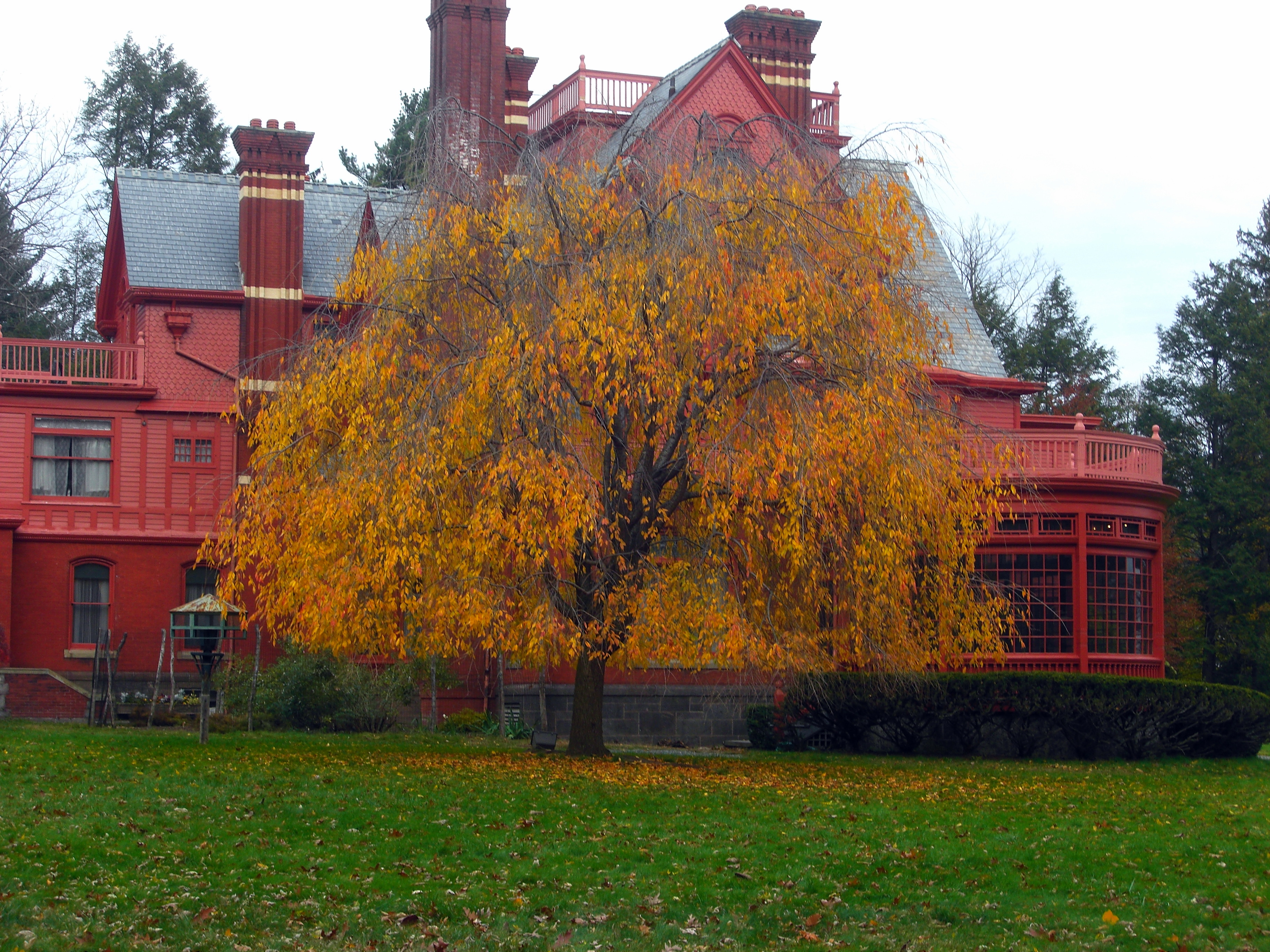
- Glenmont

- Location in Essex County Location in New Jersey Location in the United States
- Coordinates: 40°47′15″N 74°14′29″W
- Country: United States
- State: New Jersey
- County: Essex
- Township: West Orange
- Elevation: 318 ft (97 m)

Population (2020)
  - Total: 821
- Time zone: UTC−05:00 (Eastern)
  - Summer (DST): UTC−04:00
- ZIP Code: 07052
- FIPS code: 34-40990
- GNIS feature ID: 0883314

Llewellyn Park is a historic gated community and census-designated place (CDP) located within West Orange in Essex County, in the U.S. state of New Jersey. Llewellyn Park is thought to be the country's first planned residential community, and the site of the first large-scale naturalization of crocus, narcissus, and jonquils. The community features 175 homes on 425 acres (172 ha) and is located 12 miles (19 km) west of New York City.

Llewellyn Park was one of the first gated communities in the United States, where the natural environment was both carefully cultivated and allowed to remain undisturbed. The landscaping is in the 19th century romantic style of New York's Central Park, and includes winding paths, ornamental trees, shrubs, and flowers.

The Llewellyn Park Historic District was added to the National Register of Historic Places in 1985 and was added to the state register the following year.

== History ==
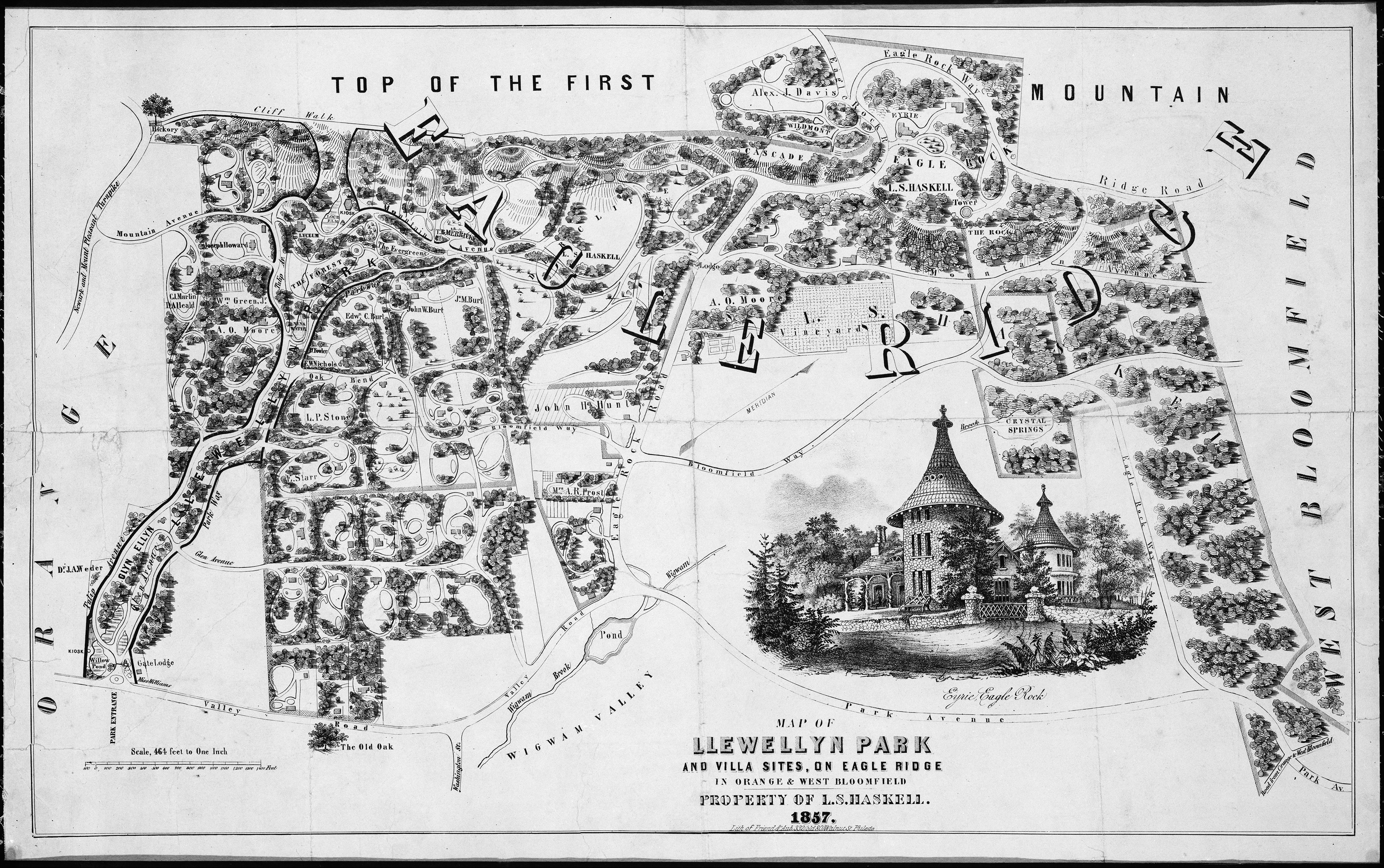
Map of Llewellyn Park and Villa Sites, by Alexander Jackson Davis, 1857

Llewellyn Park was founded in 1853 by the New York City businessman and landscape gardener Llewellyn Solomon Haskell, father of the Civil War Union Army officer, Llewellyn F. Haskell and was designed by Alexander Jackson Davis. Haskell discovered the lush, wooded area on the eastern slope on the first range of the Watchung Mountains which was originally farmland owned by Ira Harrison Condit. Purchasing 100 acres from Condit in 1855, Haskell set out to create a suburban community of country estates. These finely crafted homes would stand amid majestic trees and running streams. The first annual meeting of proprietors was held at the Park's Gatehouse on January 1, 1858, and continues today.

The Park became home to many residents of note, especially Thomas Edison, whose home Glenmont is part of the Thomas Edison National Historical Park. Other residents over the years included abolitionist James Miller McKim, whose charming house contained secret chambers to hide escaped slaves traversing the Underground Railroad, the Merck family (George W. Merck was raised there), and the Colgate family.

Its annual meeting, going on for 158 years, is the longest continuous string of meetings of any residential association in the United States.

A number of Llewellyn Park's homes were designed by prominent American architects including Alexander Jackson Davis, Calvert Vaux, Charles McKim, Stanford White, and Robert A.M. Stern.

== Location ==
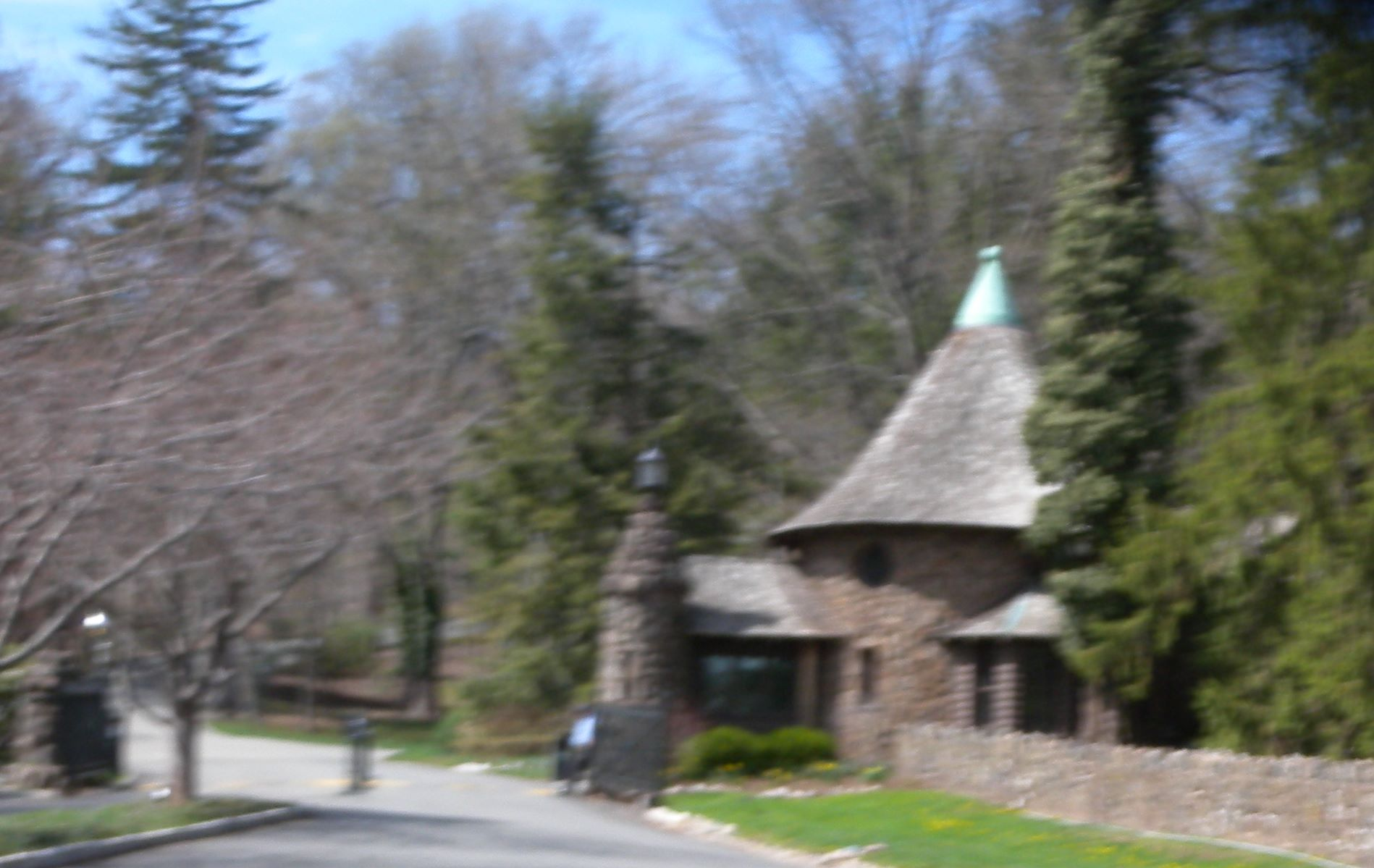
Main Street Gatehouse

The main entrance to Llewellyn Park is located on Main Street in West Orange, near Thomas Edison's factory complex, now a museum and also a part of the Thomas Edison National Historical Park. The entrance is within West Orange's historic district, which is entering a phase of major revitalization. There is a side entrance to Llewellyn Park located on Eagle Rock Avenue that is electronically monitored and activated by the security guards within the Gatehouse on the Main Street entrance.

Llewellyn Park residents enjoy the combination of close proximity to New York City, a relaxed semi-rural lifestyle, and exceptional privacy.

== Demographics ==
Historical population
Census	Pop.	Note	%±
2020	821		—
U.S. Decennial Census; 2020

Llewellyn Park was first listed as a census designated place in the 2020 U.S. census.

Llewellyn Park CDP, New Jersey – Racial and ethnic composition Note: the US Census treats Hispanic/Latino as an ethnic category. This table excludes Latinos from the racial categories and assigns them to a separate category. Hispanics/Latinos may be of any race.
Race / Ethnicity (NH = Non-Hispanic)	Pop 2020	2020
White alone (NH)	366	44.58%
Black or African American alone (NH)	159	19.37%
Native American or Alaska Native alone (NH)	1	0.12%
Asian alone (NH)	67	8.16%
Native Hawaiian or Pacific Islander alone (NH)	0	0.00%
Other race alone (NH)	17	2.07%
Mixed race or Multiracial (NH)	67	8.16%
Hispanic or Latino (any race)	144	17.54%
Total	821	100.00%

As of the 2020, the population was 821.

== Community ==
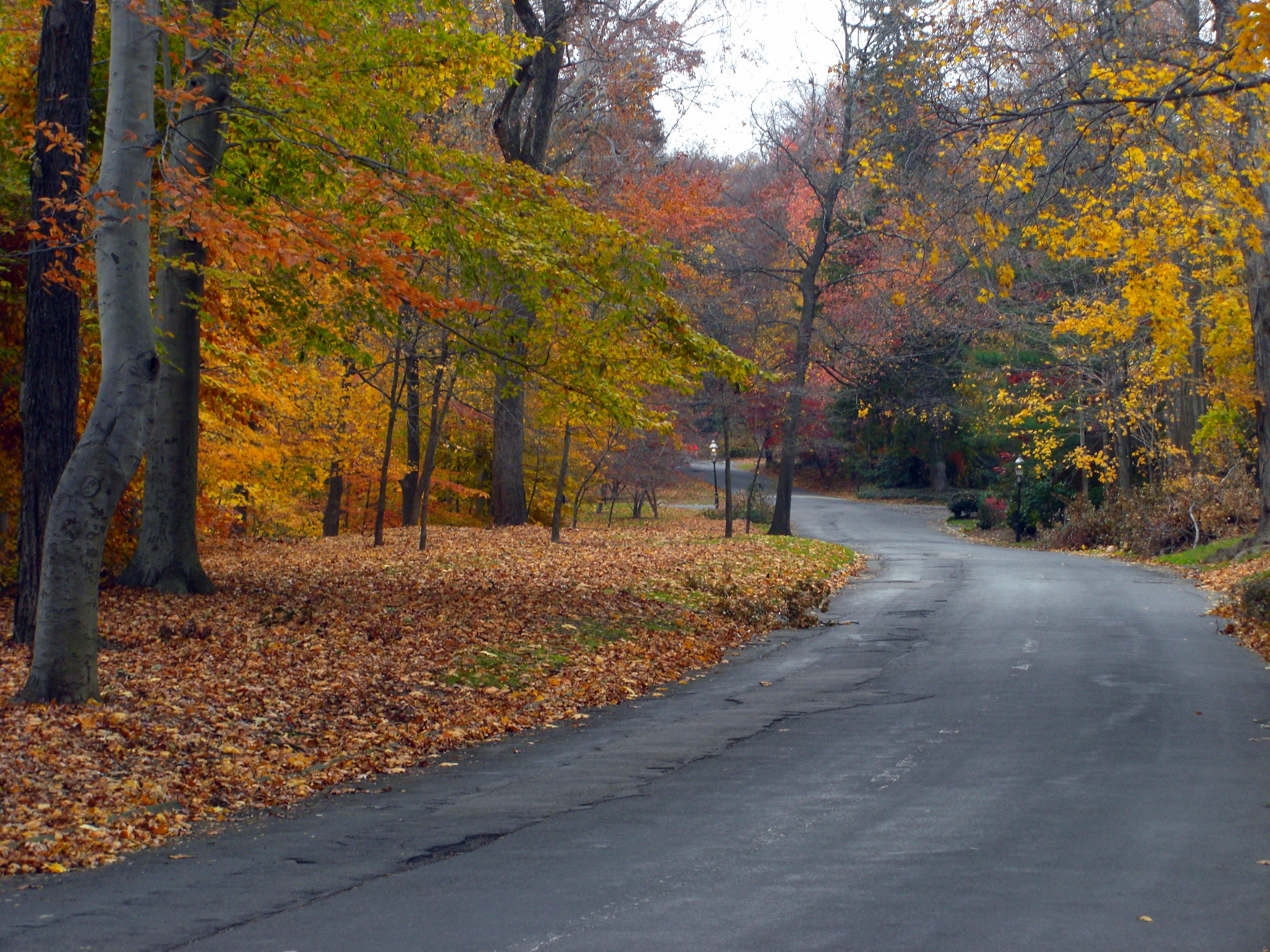
A road in Llewellyn Park

The Ramble is a common area of 50 acres (200,000 m^{2}) landscaped with streams and paths. Period gas lamps line the curving streets of the community. The Llewellyn Park Ladies Association is largely responsible for the beautification of the Park. Its activities include annual plantings; purchasing, and selecting appropriate sites for rustic architecture including gazebos and benches; and directing the Park's maintenance staff to care for the trees, shrubs and flowers.

A major function of the Ladies Association is its commitment to fostering a sense of community among Park residents by planning social activities for adults and children. These activities include a Halloween Party for the children and a Holiday Party for adults. Recently the Ladies Association has also sponsored a barn dance, an Easter egg hunt, a Victorian picnic, and a High Tea. Residents' professions and occupations range widely and include business persons, professionals, academics, and artists.

Residents operate a Llewellyn Park Historical Society dedicated to preserving historic artifacts relating to the creation and history of the Park. The Llewellyn Park Preservation Foundation (an independent 501 c(3) charitable organization) is dedicated to maintaining and restoring the historic character.

== Notable people ==
People who were born in, residents of, or otherwise closely associated with Llewellyn Park include:

- John L. Blake (1831–1899), politician who represented New Jersey's 6th congressional district from 1879 to 1881
- Alexander Jackson Davis (1803–1892), architect who helped create Llewellyn Park
- Charles Edison (1890–1969), United States Secretary of the Navy 1940, Governor of New Jersey 1941 to 1944 and son of Thomas Edison
- Theodore Miller Edison (1898–1992), only child of Thomas Edison who graduated from college; went on to become an inventor with over 80 patents
- Thomas Alva Edison (1847–1931), inventor of the phonograph, the incandescent electric lightbulb, and the first practical motion picture camera whose home was Glenmont Mansion. Edison's Black Maria, the first movie studio, was located in West Orange
- Whoopi Goldberg (born 1955), comedian, actress, talk show host
- Llewellyn F. Haskell (1842–1929), United States Army officer and a Union general during the American Civil War
