= Joseph Allen =

Joseph Allen may refer to:

== Clergy ==
- Joseph Allen (bishop) (1770–1845), Bishop of Bristol and Bishop of Ely
- Joseph Allen (clergyman) (1790–1873), American clergyman
- Joseph Henry Allen (1820–1898), American Unitarian scholar and son of Joseph Allen (1790–1873)

== Politics ==
- Joseph Allen (Massachusetts politician) (1749–1827), American politician from Massachusetts
- Joseph Allen (Maine politician) (fl. 1907–1916), American politician from Maine
- Joseph Allen (Australian politician) (1869–1933), member of the Western Australian Legislative Council
- Joseph B. Allen (1914–2006), American politician from Florida

== Other ==
- Joseph Allen (doctor of medicine) (1714–1796), doctor, circumnavigator, Master of Dulwich College
- Joseph William Allen (1803–1852), English landscape painter and art teacher
- Joseph H. Allen (1821–1884), colonel in the American Civil War and Supervisor of Brunswick, New York
- Joseph G. Allen, public health expert
- Joseph P. Allen (born 1937), NASA astronaut
- Joseph P. Allen (psychologist) (born 1958), American psychologist and academic
- H. Joseph Allen (born 1941), American businessman, racehorse owner and film producer
- Joseph Allen, a fictional character in Call of Duty: Modern Warfare 2

== See also ==
- Joe Allen (disambiguation)
- Joey Allen (sailor), New Zealand sailor
- Jo Allen (disambiguation)
- Joseph Alleine (1634–1668), English Puritan Nonconformist pastor and author
- Joseph Allan (fl. 1932–1933), rugby league footballer
- Allen (surname)
