= Charles Rice (general) =

American politician

Member of the Massachusetts House of Representatives from the Needham, Norfolk district
- In office 1829–1831

Personal details
- Born: December 26, 1787 Brighton, Massachusetts
- Died: November 20, 1863 (aged 75) Needham, Massachusetts
- Party: Democratic
- Spouse(s): Lucy (Mann) Rice (m. 1816; d. 1819); Maria (Jennings) Rice (b. 1800; m. 1820; d. 1887)
- Children: Maria (Rice) Leslie (1821 – c. 1900); Charles Rice (1823 – c. 1910); Sarah Rice (1825 – c. 1900); Lucy (Rice) Seaward (1828 – c. 1910); Zerniah Rice (c. 1831 – c. 1910); Mary Rice (1833–1852)
- Profession: military officer, state legislator, justice of the peace

Military service
- Branch/service: Massachusetts State Militia
- Years of service: 1805–1843
- Rank: Brigadier General
- Commands: 2nd Brigade, 1st Division, Massachusetts Militia
- Battles/wars: War of 1812

Charles Rice (December 26, 1787 – November 20, 1863) was a brigadier general in the Massachusetts Militia, a selectman in Needham, a justice of the peace and a member of the Massachusetts House of Representatives.

== Biography ==
Charles Rice was born in Brighton, Massachusetts on 26 December 1787 to John Rice and Mary (Lee) Rice. He married Lucy Mann of Needham on 23 November 1809, and they had no children. After Lucy Rice's death in 1819, Rice married Maria Jennings of Natick on 8 November 1820 and they had six children.

Rice was an owner of a planing mill and a grist mill in the village of Newton Lower Falls in Needham, Massachusetts and leased lands to other factory owners. Rice served as a selectman in Needham from 1825 to 1833, and was a leader in the Democratic Party in the town. He was elected to the Massachusetts House of Representatives in 1829 and served until 1831. Rice served a militiaman in the War of 1812, and rose through the ranks as lieutenant colonel of the 1st Regiment, 2nd Brigade, 1st Division of the Massachusetts State Militia from 1825 to 1827, and in 1828 became general of the brigade, serving until 1843. He was a prominent freemason, and was a local justice of the peace. General Charles Rice and Emery Fiske are credited with the first proposal (1852) to separate Newton Lower Falls and other villages from Needham to form the town of Wellesley.

Rice died in Needham on 20 Nov 1863, and he was buried at St. Mary's Churchyard in the village of Newton Lower Falls. General Charles Rice's nephew Alexander Hamilton Rice was a governor and congressman from Massachusetts.
