= William F. Allen =

William F. Allen is the name of:

- William Fessenden Allen (1831–1906), American businessman and politician in the Kingdom of Hawaii and Republic of Hawaii
- William F. Allen (New York politician) (1808–1878), American lawyer and politician
- William F. Allen (Delaware politician) (1883–1946), American businessman and politician
- William Francis Allen (1830–1889), American classical scholar
- William F. Allen (engineer), former CEO of Stone & Webster
