= Josiah Gardner Abbott =

American politician (1814–1891)

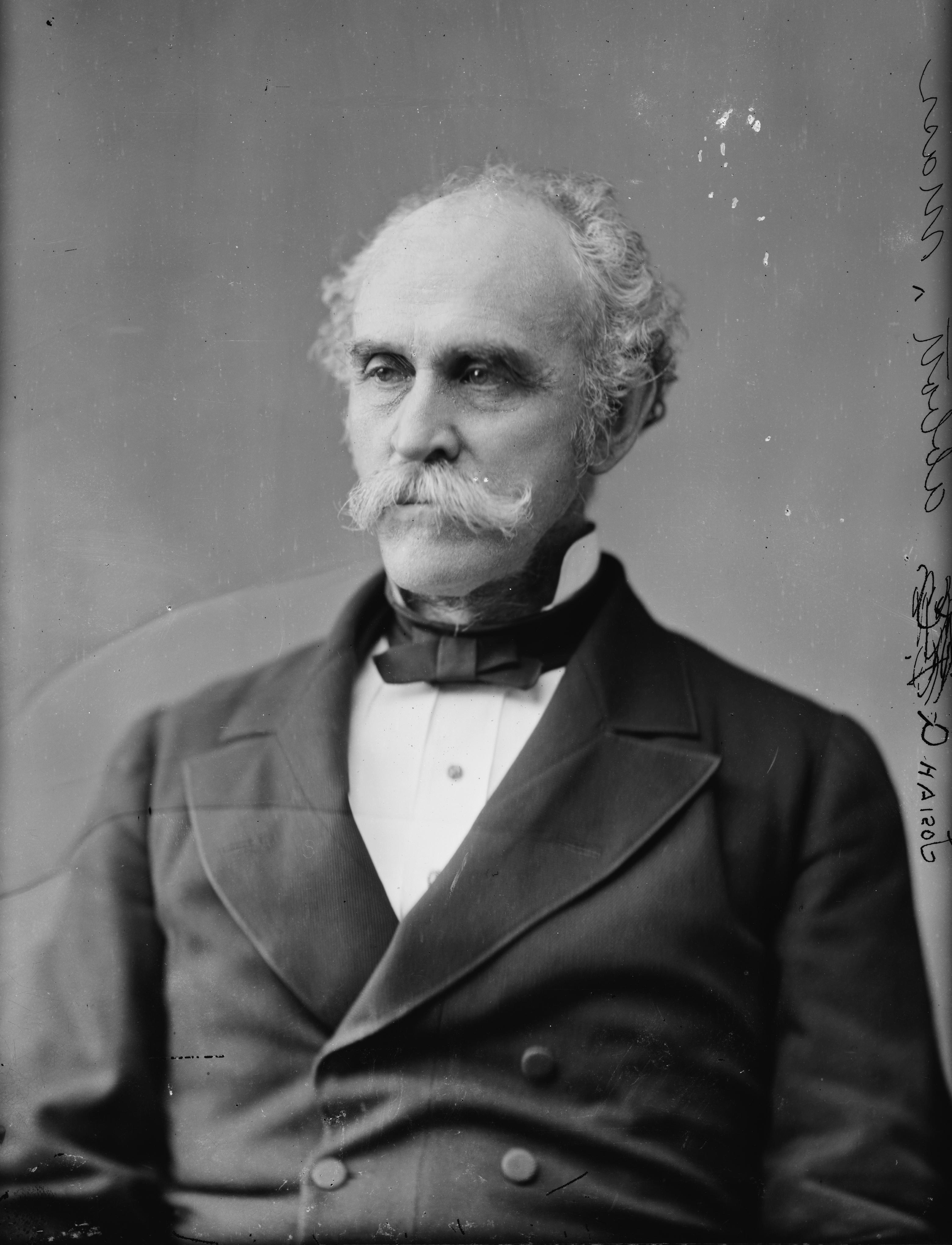
- Abbott c. 1870s

Member of the U.S. House of Representatives from Massachusetts's 4th district
- In office July 28, 1876 – March 3, 1877
- Preceded by: Rufus S. Frost
- Succeeded by: Leopold Morse

Member of the Massachusetts House of Representatives
- In office 1836

Member of the Massachusetts Senate
- In office 1841–1842

Personal details
- Born: November 1, 1814 Chelmsford, Massachusetts, U.S.
- Died: June 2, 1891 (aged 76) Wellesley, Massachusetts, U.S.
- Resting place: St. Mary's Church Cemetery
- Party: Democratic
- Spouse: Caroline Livermore
- Education: Harvard University; Williams College
- Occupation: Teacher, lawyer

Josiah Gardner Abbott (November 1, 1814 – June 2, 1891) was an American politician who served in the Massachusetts General Court and as a member of the United States House of Representatives from Massachusetts.

== Early life ==
Abbott was born in Chelmsford, Middlesex County, Massachusetts on 1 November 1814. He was the son of Caleb Abbott (1779–1846) and Mercy Abbott (1782–1834). His first American ancestors, George Abbott and William Fletcher, were English Puritans, who settled in Massachusetts in 1640 and 1653, respectively.

He attended the Chelmsford Academy in Concord and graduated from Harvard University in 1832 with high honors, the youngest of his class, and then attended Williams College in Williamstown. In 1862, Williams conferred on him the degree of LL.D.

== Career ==
Following his schooling, Abbott worked as a teacher and a lawyer, then became a member of the Massachusetts House of Representatives in 1836. In 1837, he was admitted to the bar and began practice in Lowell, the same year, he was elected to the house of representatives of his state, the youngest member of that body. He became a member of the Massachusetts State Senate from 1841 to 1842. He was an aide to Governor Marcus Morton in 1843. From 1850 to 1855 he was a master in chancery. He also served as a member of the Massachusetts state constitutional convention, justice of the superior court for Suffolk County, an overseer of Harvard University, and several times was the unsuccessful Democratic candidate for United States Senator.

In 1860, Abbott declined an appointment to the Massachusetts Supreme Judicial Court, and in 1861 declined the Democratic nomination for state attorney general. He finally was victorious as a Democratic candidate for the United States House of Representatives, and served from July 28, 1876 to March 3, 1877. He was a member of the Electoral Commission created by the act of Congress approved January 29, 1877, to decide the presidential election of 1876.

Upon leaving the Congress, he returned to the practice of law. His fifty years of active practice as a lawyer connected his name with some of the most celebrated litigations of his time.

== Personal life ==
Abbott was married to Caroline Livermore (1814–1887), the daughter of U.S. Congressman Edward St. Loe Livermore. Both Josiah and Caroline were descended from officers who served in the Continental Army during the American Revolutionary War. Together, they were the parents of:

- Edward Gardner Abbott (1840–1862), who died during the American Civil War.
- Henry Livermore Abbott (1842–1864), a Major in the Union Army during the Civil War who was posthumously awarded the grade of brevet brigadier general.
- Fletcher Morton Abbott (1843–1925)
- William Stackpole Abbott (1844–1846), who died young.
- Samuel Appleton Brown Abbott (1846–1931)
- Sarah Abbott (1850–1933), who married William Pickman Fay.
- Franklin Pierce Abbott (1852–1923)
- Arthur St. Loe Abbott (1853–1863)
- Grafton St. Loe Abbott (1856–1915), who married Mary Ogden Adams, a daughter of Charles Francis Adams Jr. and a descendant of Presidents John Adams and John Quincy Adams.
- Holker Welch Abbott (1858–1930)

He died at his home in Wellesley Hills on 2 June 1891, and was interred in St. Mary's Church Cemetery, in nearby Newton Lower Falls, Massachusetts.

U.S. House of Representatives
| Preceded by Rufus S. Frost | Member of the U.S. House of Representatives from Massachusetts's 4th congressional district July 28, 1876 – March 3, 1877 | Succeeded by Leopold Morse |
