= Death of a Champion =

1939 film by Robert Florey

- Directed by: Robert Florey
- Distributed by: Paramount Pictures
- Release date: August 24, 1939
- Running time: 67 minutes
- Country: United States
- Language: English

Death of a Champion is a 1939 American film starring Lynne Overman, Virginia Dale, Joseph Allen, and Donald O'Connor.

== Plot ==
Detectives attempt to discover who killed a famous show dog.

== Cast ==
- Lynne Overman as Oliver Quade
- Virginia Dale as Patsy Doyle
- Joseph Allen as Richie Oakes
- Donald O'Connor as Small Fry
- Susan Paley]] as Lois Lanyard
- Harry Davenport as Guy Lanyard
- Robert Paige as Alec Temple
- David Clyde as Angus McTavish
- Walter Soderling as Hofnagel
