= Lewis Arnold =

Lewis Arnold may refer to:

- Lewis Golding Arnold (1817–1871), U.S. Army officer
- Lewis Arnold (director), English director
