= Rebecca Lee Crumpler =

American physician (1831–1895)

- Born: Rebecca Davis; February 8, 1831; Delaware, U.S.
- Died: March 9, 1895 (aged 64); Hyde Park, Boston, Massachusetts, U.S.
- Resting place: Fairview Cemetery, Boston, Massachusetts
- Education: New England Female Medical College (Now Boston University)
- Known for: First African-American woman to receive a medical degree
- Spouses: Wyatt Lee (m. 1852; died 1863); Arthur Crumpler (m. 1865)
- Scientific career
- Fields: Medicine

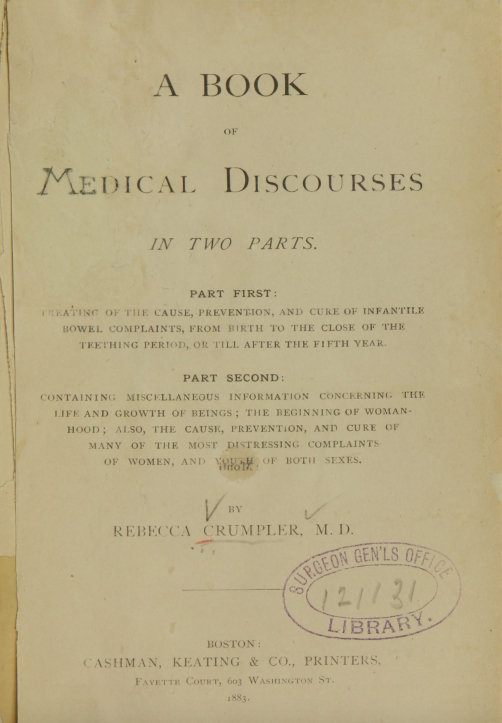
A Book of Medical Discourses (1883) by Rebecca Lee Crumpler, M.D.

Rebecca Lee Crumpler (born Rebecca Davis, February 8, 1831 – March 9, 1895) was an American physician, nurse and author. She was the first African-American female doctor of medicine, qualifying at the New England Female Medical College in 1864. (Note: Rebecca Cole was thought to be the first African American female physician. Subsequent research shows Crumpler was first (1864), Cole second (1867) and Susan McKinney Steward third.) Crumpler was also one of the first female physician authors in the nineteenth century. In 1883, she published A Book of Medical Discourses. The book has two parts that cover the prevention and cure of infantile bowel complaints, and the life and growth of human beings. Dedicated to nurses and mothers, it focuses on maternal and pediatric medical care and was among the first publications written by an African American on the subject of medicine.

Crumpler graduated from medical college at a time when very few African Americans were permitted to attend medical college or publish books. Crumpler first practiced medicine in Boston, primarily serving poor women and children. After the American Civil War ended in 1865, she moved to Richmond, Virginia, believing treating women and children was an ideal way to perform missionary work. Crumpler worked for the Freedmen's Bureau to provide medical care for freedmen and freedwomen.

Crumpler was subject to "intense racism" and sexism while practicing medicine. During this time, many men believed that a nearly immutable difference in average brain size between men and women explained the difference in social, political, and intellectual attainment. Because of this, many male physicians did not respect Crumpler, and would not approve her prescriptions for patients or listen to her medical opinions.

Crumpler later returned to Boston, where she continued to treat women and children. The Rebecca Lee Pre-Health Society at Syracuse University and the Rebecca Lee Society, one of the first medical societies for African-American women, were named after her. Her Joy Street house in Beacon Hill is a stop on the Boston Women's Heritage Trail.

== Early life and education ==
On February 8, 1831, Rebecca Lee Crumpler was born Rebecca Davis in Christiana, Delaware to Matilda Webber and Absolum Davis. She was raised in Pennsylvania by her aunt who cared for ill townspeople. Her aunt acted as the doctor in her community and had a huge influence on Crumpler's decision to pursue a career in medicine. She attended a private school, the West Newton English and Classical School in West Newton, Massachusetts as a “special student.” Crumpler moved to Charlestown, Massachusetts, in 1852.

== Education ==
=== Nursing and medical school ===
From 1855 to 1864, Crumpler was employed as a nurse. (Note: Formal training was not required until nursing schools were established, which did not occur until 1873.) She was accepted into the New England Female Medical College for the 1859–1860 academic year. She received scholarships for all three years at the school, initially from a fund provided by the Commonwealth of Massachusetts and later from the Wade Scholarship Fund, established at the school by a bequest from local businessman and Massachusetts legislator John Wade of Woburn. She was the only African-American student at the school.

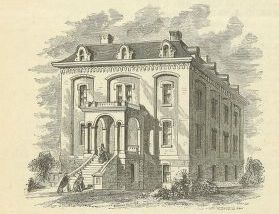
New England Female Medical College in 1860

In the mid-19th century, it was rare for women or black men to be admitted to medical school. In 1860, due to the heavy demands of medical care for American Civil War veterans, opportunities increased for women physicians and doctors. Due to her talent, Crumpler was given a recommendation to attend the school by her supervising physician when she was a medical apprentice. That year, there were 54,543 physicians in the United States, 270 of them were women — all white — and 180 were Black men.

Crumpler graduated from New England Female Medical College in 1864 (Note: Claims have been made that she was "homeopathically trained", and gained a lot of knowledge from other pioneers in her field at the medical college. However, Crumpler and the many other pioneers are not recognized, nor does "history record them as homeopathic practitioners".) after having completed three years of coursework, a thesis, and final oral examinations in February 1864. On March 1, 1864, the school's board of trustees named her a Doctor of Medicine. (Note: The faculty was hesitant to pass Crumpler because they thought she showed slow progress in learning. They ended up passing her. The doctors whom Crumpler worked with while in medical school helped persuade the faculty to pass her.) Married to Wyatt Lee at that time, she was identified as Mrs. Rebecca Lee by the school, where she was the only African-American graduate. She was the country's first African-American woman to become a formally-trained physician. (Note: The school closed in 1873 due to financial issues, without graduating another black woman.)

=== Physician ===
Crumpler first practiced medicine in Boston and primarily cared for poor African-American women and children. After the end of the American Civil War (1861–1865), she moved to Richmond, Virginia, believing it to be an ideal way to provide missionary service, as well as to gain more experience learning about diseases that affected women and children. She said of that time: "During my stay there nearly every hour was improved in that sphere of labor. The last quarter of the year 1866, I was enabled... to have access each day to a very large number of the indigent, and others of different classes, in a population of over 30,000 colored."

Crumpler worked for the Freedmen's Bureau to provide medical care to freedmen and freedwomen who were denied care by white physicians. At the Freedmen's Bureau, she worked under the assistant commissioner, Orlando Brown. Subject to intense racism by both the administration and other physicians, she had difficulty getting prescriptions filled and was ignored by male physicians. Some people heckled that the M.D. behind her name stood for "Mule Driver". (Note: The great need for medical providers encouraged other black people to join the medical profession. Black charitable organizations and white missionary organizations provided funding for the first black medical schools.)

Crumpler moved to 67 Joy Street in Boston, a predominantly African-American community in the North Slope of Beacon Hill. She practiced medicine and treated children without much concern for the parents' ability to pay. Her house is on the Boston Women's Heritage Trail.

=== Education ===
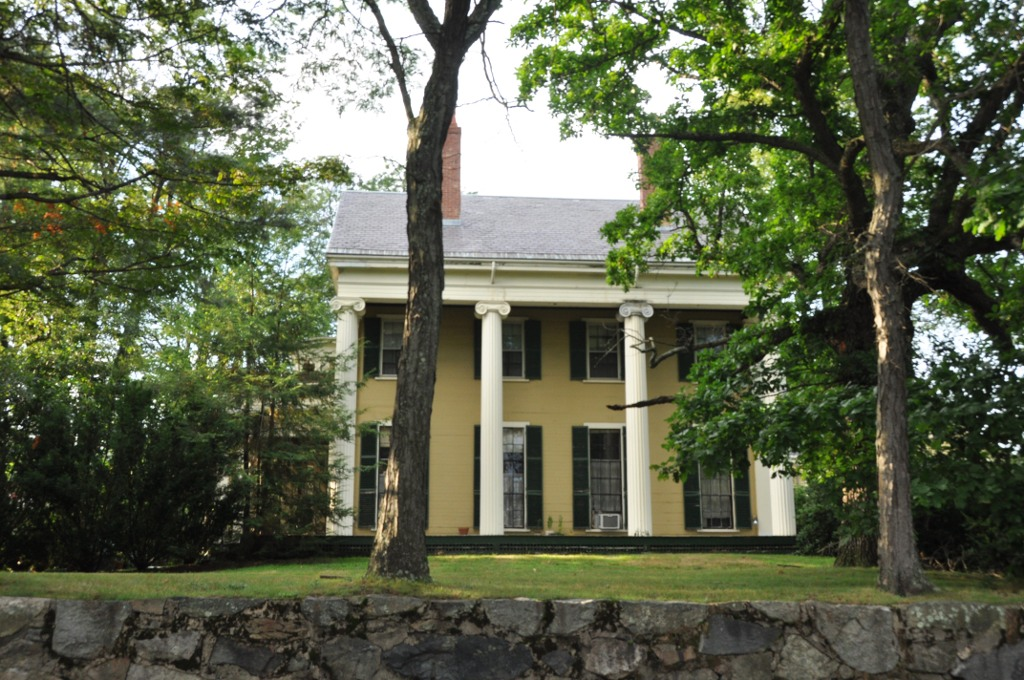
Nathaniel Topliff Allen Homestead, where the West Newton English and Classical School was located beginning 1854

In 1860, bearing letters of recommendation from her physician-employers, Crumpler was accepted into the elite West Newton English and Classical School in Massachusetts, where she was a "special student in mathematics". Crumpler taught in Wilmington, beginning in 1874 and in New Castle, Delaware, beginning in 1876.

=== A Book of Medical Discourses ===
In 1883, Crumpler published A Book of Medical Discourses from the notes she kept over the course of her medical career. Dedicated to nurses and mothers, it focused on the medical care of women and children. Her main desire in presenting this book was to emphasize the "possibilities of prevention". Therefore, she recommended that women should study the mechanisms of human structure before becoming a nurse in order to better enable themselves to protect life. However, Crumpler stated that most nurses did not agree with this and tended to forget that for every ailment, there was a cause and it was within their power to remove it. Although her primary focus was on the health of women and children, which seemed to be influenced by homeopathy, Crumpler recommended courses of treatment without stating that the treatment was homeopathic. She did not mention that medicine could be harmful, but stated the conventional amount of standard medicine usage. Her medical book is divided into two sections: in the first part she focuses on preventing and mitigating intestinal problems that can occur around the teething period until the child is about five years of age; the second part mainly focused on the following areas: "life and growth of beings", the beginning of womanhood and the prevention and cure of most of the "distressing complaints" of both sexes. Although the book was focused on medical advice, Crumpler also ties in autobiographical details that contain political, social, and moral commentary. Specifically in the first chapter, Crumpler gave non-medical advice concerning what age and how a woman should enter into marriage. The chapter also contained advice for both men and women on how to ensure a happy marriage. Crumpler describes the progression of experiences that led her to study and practice medicine in her book:

It may be well to state here that, having been reared by a kind aunt in Pennsylvania, whose usefulness with the sick was continually sought, I early conceived a liking for, and sought every opportunity to relieve the sufferings of others. Later in life I devoted my time, when best I could, to nursing as a business, serving under different doctors for a period of eight years; most of the time at my adopted home in Charlestown, Middlesex County, Massachusetts. From these doctors I received letters commending me to the faculty of the New England Female Medical College, whence, four years afterward, I received the degree of Doctress of Medicine.

She wrote, “Parents should hold onto their children, and children should stand by their parents, until the last strand of the silken cord is broken.”

At the time, many writings and books by African-American authors had prefaces and introductions written in the style of white male writings to give them authentication. Crumpler introduced her own text, and justified her work based on her own authority. She regularly refers to her own experience and opinions in the work, establishing herself as a skilled expert whose advice should be followed, while presenting this advice in a familiar and personal style directly to the women who are intended as its primary audience. An article in 1894 in The Boston Globe described the book as “valuable” and Crumpler as “a very pleasant and intellectual woman” and “an indefatigable church worker.”

== Personal life ==
While living in Charlestown, Rebecca Davis married Wyatt Lee, a laborer from Virginia who was formerly enslaved. They were married on April 19, 1852. This was Wyatt's second marriage, and her first. A year later Wyatt's son, Albert, died at age 7. This tragedy may have motivated Rebecca to begin her study of nursing for the next eight years. Rebecca was a medical student when her husband died of tuberculosis on April 18, 1863. He is buried at Mount Hope Cemetery in Boston.

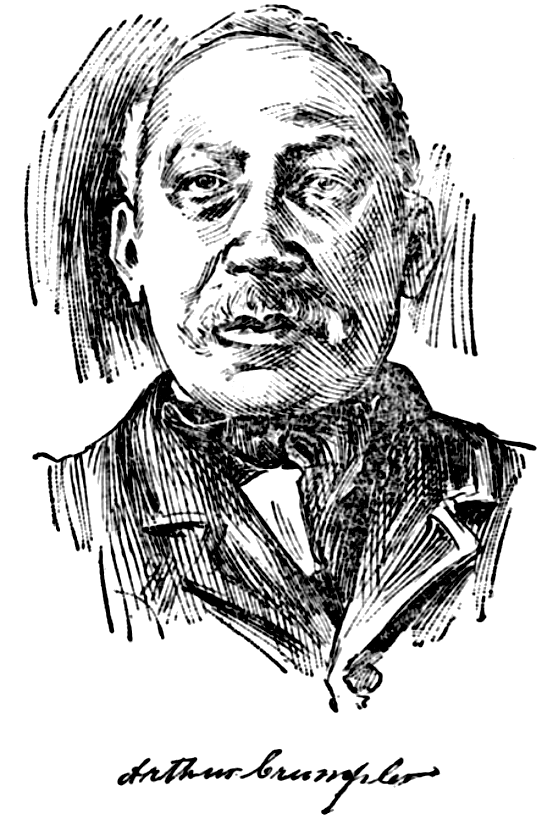
Arthur Crumpler, c.1898

Dr. Rebecca Lee married Arthur Crumpler in Saint John, New Brunswick on May 24, 1865. Arthur was formerly enslaved and escaped bondage from Southampton County, Virginia. Born in 1824, he was the son of Samuel Crumpler, who was enslaved by Benjamin Crumpler. Arthur lived on the neighboring estate of a large landowner, Robert Adams, with his mother and siblings. When Adams died, his family was sold and nine-year-old Arthur was kept by Robert Adams' son, John Adams of Smithfield, Virginia, after Arthur won a wrestling contest with John on the day of the estate auction. Except for one sister, he never found out the whereabouts of the people who continued enslaving and "purchased" his family members. He served with the Union Army at Fort Monroe, Virginia as a blacksmith, based upon his training and experience. He went to Massachusetts in 1862 and was taken in by Nathaniel Allen, founder of the West Newton English and Classical School, also called the Allen School.

Rebecca and Arthur Crumpler were active members of the Twelfth Baptist Church, where Arthur was a trustee. They had a home at 20 Garden Street in Boston. Their daughter Lizzie Sinclair Crumpler was born in mid-December 1870, but as no other records have been found, it is believed the child did not survive infancy. For instance, Crumpler and her husband Arthur lived in Hyde Park, Massachusetts in 1880, but they did not have a child living with them at that time.

Crumpler spoke at a funeral service for Massachusetts Senator Charles Sumner upon his death in 1874. She read a poem that she had written for him, where "she touchingly alluded to his love for the gifted Emerson." By 1880, the Crumplers moved to Hyde Park, Boston.

Although no photographs or other images of Crumpler survive, a Boston Globe article described her as "59 or 60 years of age, tall and straight, with light brown skin and gray hair." About marriage, she said the secret to a successful marriage "is to continue in the careful routine of the courting days, till it becomes well understood between the two."

Rebecca Crumpler died of fibroid tumors on March 9, 1895, in Fairview, Massachusetts, while still residing in Hyde Park. Arthur died in May 1910, and they are both buried at the nearby Fairview Cemetery. Rebecca and Arthur Crumpler were buried in unmarked graves for 125 years, until July 16, 2020, when granite headstones were donated for their gravesite. The granite stone was the result of a fundraising appeal led by the Friends of the Hyde Park Library.

== Legacy ==
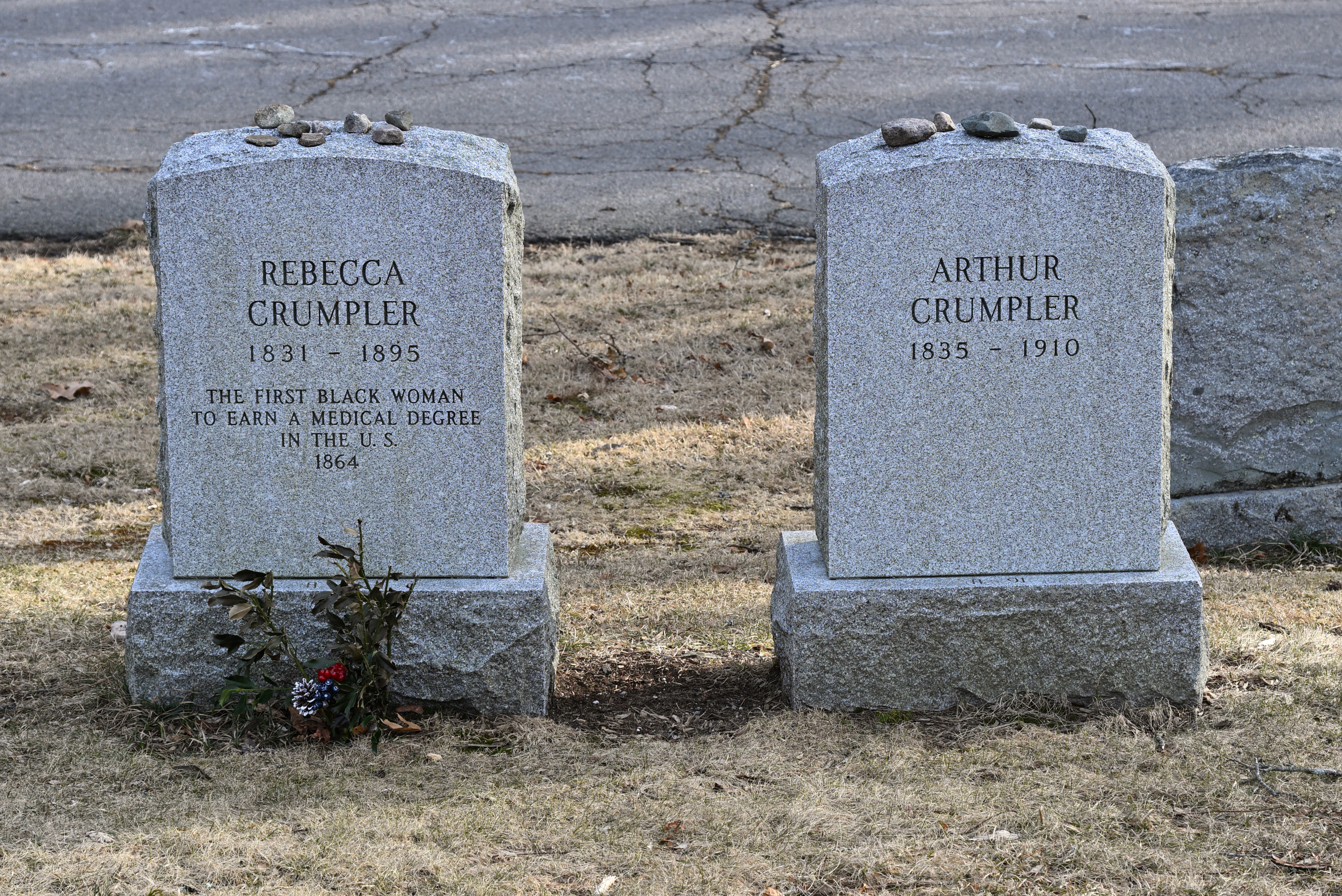
Rebecca's and Arthur's gravestones at Fairview Cemetery in Boston

The Rebecca Lee Society, one of the first medical societies for African-American women, was named in Crumpler's honor. Her home on Joy Street is a stop on the Boston Women's Heritage Trail.

In 2019, Virginia Governor Ralph Northam declared March 30 (National Doctors Day) the Dr. Rebecca Lee Crumpler Day.

At Syracuse University there is a pre-health club named "The Rebecca Lee Pre-Health Society". This club encourages people of diverse backgrounds to pursue health professions. They offer mentors, workshops, and resources to help members succeed.

February 8, 2021, was declared "Dr. Rebecca Lee Crumpler Day" in Boston as part of the 190th anniversary of her birth.

In 2021, poet Jessy Randall honored Crumpler in a poem called "Rebecca Lee Crumpler (1831–1895)", published in the Women's Review of Books and reprinted in her 2022 collection Mathematics for Ladies: Poems on Women in Science.

== See also ==
- List of African-American firsts
- List of Boston University people
