= Lewis Golding Arnold =

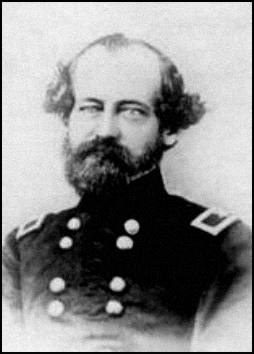
- Brig. Gen. Lewis G. Arnold, 1864
- Born: January 15, 1817; Perth Amboy, New Jersey, U.S.
- Died: September 22, 1871 (aged 54); Boston, Massachusetts, U.S.
- Burial place: St. Mary's Episcopal Church Cemetery; Newton Lower Falls, Massachusetts
- Military career
- Allegiance: United States of America; Union
- Branch: United States Army; Union Army
- Service years: 1837–1864
- Rank: Brigadier General
- Units: 2nd U.S. Artillery; 1st U.S. Artillery
- Commands: New Orleans Garrison
- Conflicts: Second Seminole War; Mexican–American War; Battle of Churubusco (WIA); Third Seminole War; Battle of Big Cypress; American Civil War; Battle of Santa Rosa Island

Lewis Golding Arnold (January 15, 1817 – September 22, 1871) was a career U.S. Army officer and a brigadier general in the Union Army during the American Civil War, primarily noted for his service in Florida.

== Birth and early years ==
Lewis G. Arnold was born in Perth Amboy, New Jersey and graduated from West Point in 1837, placing tenth in his class. He fought in the Second Seminole War and the Mexican–American War, where he was severely wounded at Chuburusco. After the war, he once again commanded troops in Florida, and led a detachment against the Seminole Indians in the April 1856 Battle of Big Cypress.

== Civil War service ==
At the onset of the Civil War, he was promoted to major of the 2nd United States Artillery and was assigned to Fort Jefferson at Dry Tortugas, Florida, in January 1861, leaving his command at Fort Independence, Massachusetts. In October 1861, he helped repulse a Confederate attack on Santa Rosa Island, and defiantly refused to surrender the outpost during three different Confederate artillery bombardments. He remained there until May 1862, having rendered invaluable service in defending the fort, which remained in Union hands through the war. In January 1862, he was promoted to brigadier general, and in October 1862 was transferred to command the city of New Orleans after it fell to Union forces.

On November 10 of that year, he was struck down by a stroke while reviewing troops, and was placed on sick leave for over a year while army officials hoped his condition would improve. When it became obvious he would be permanently disabled, he was retired from the Army in February 1864.

Arnold died 8 years later in Boston, Massachusetts and is buried in St. Mary's Episcopal Church Cemetery in Newton Lower Falls.

== See also ==
- List of American Civil War generals (Union)
