= Sarah Fuller (educator) =

American educator

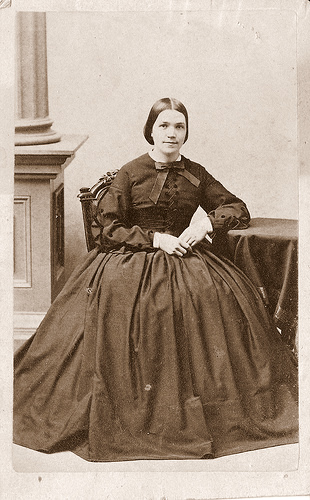
- Fuller circa 1860s. Photo by James Wallace Black
- Born: February 15, 1836; Weston, Massachusetts
- Died: August 1, 1927 (aged 91); Newton Lower Falls, Massachusetts
- Parent(s): Havey Fuller, Celynda Fiske

Sarah Fuller (February 15, 1836 – August 1, 1927) was an American educator.

== Biography ==
Fuller was born in Weston, Massachusetts to Harvey and Celynda (Fiske) Fuller, and was educated at West Newton English and Classical School in Massachusetts. After graduating in 1855, she taught in Newton and Boston. In 1869, she trained at the Clarke School for the Deaf under Harriet B. Rogers, then became principal at the newly formed Boston School for Deaf-Mutes; a school founded on the behest of Rev. Dexter S. King. In 1871, the school staff was trained in the skill of teaching deaf children how to speak by Alexander Graham Bell. Sarah became an advocate of this practice, as well as the promotion of education for deaf children starting at the earliest age possible. She was also present when the first message was sent over the telephone.

In 1890, Fuller applied the methods she learned and developed from Bell in giving the first speech lessons to Helen Keller.

In 1888, she published An Illustrated Primer for teachers of the deaf. She helped found the American Association to Promote the Teaching of Speech to the Deaf in 1890, and became director of that association in 1896. She founded the Home for Little Deaf Children in 1902, and retired as a principal in 1910. Sarah died in Newton Lower Falls, Massachusetts, and is buried in Saint Mary's Cemetery.

== Legacy ==
The Sarah Fuller Foundation for Little Deaf Children (1888–1972) was named after her.
