= William Francis Allen =

American classical philologist (1830–1889)

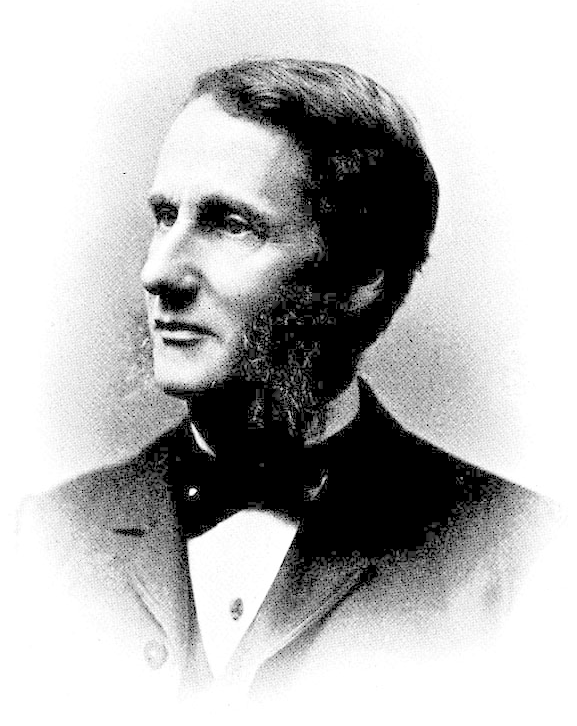
- Allen in 1865
- Born: September 5, 1830; Northborough, Massachusetts
- Died: December 9, 1889 (aged 59)
- Education: Harvard College
- Father: Joseph Allen

William Francis Allen (September 5, 1830 – December 9, 1889) was an American classical scholar and an editor of the first book of American slave songs, Slave Songs of the United States.

Allen was born in Northborough, Massachusetts in 1830, the son of Joseph Allen. He graduated Harvard College in 1851; later he traveled and studied in Europe. A Unitarian, he considered the ministry before deciding to pursue a literary and scholarly career. In 1856, he became assistant principal at the West Newton English and Classical School in Massachusetts, headed by his cousin Nathaniel Topliff Allen. In 1862 he married a former student of the Allen School, Mary Tileston Lambert, daughter of Rev Henry and Catherine Porter Lambert, from West Newton. In 1863–4, during the Civil War, William and his wife Mary ran a school for newly emancipated slaves on the Sea Islands of South Carolina. His detailed journals about their this experience were published in A Yankee Scholar in Coastal South Carolina: William Allen's Civil War Journals. In 1864 and 1865, he worked as a sanitary agent among black war refugees in Arkansas. He returned to the Lambert family home in West Newton, MA in 1865 in time for the birth of their daughter Katherine, followed by the death of his wife Mary one month later.

After the war, he taught at Antioch College, and in 1867, he became professor of ancient languages and history (afterwards Latin language and Roman history) at the University of Wisconsin–Madison. His daughter Katherine Lambert Allen joined him and his new family in Wisconsin: she later earned a bachelor's degree (1887) and PhD (1898) and became an instructor at the university. Allen was elected a member of the American Antiquarian Society in 1888. He died in December 1889.

He wrote prolifically for journals and magazines. His contributions to classical studies chiefly consist of schoolbooks published in the Allen (his brother Joseph Henry Allen) and Greenough series. The Slave Songs of the United States (1867), of which he was joint-editor with Charles Pickard Ware and Lucy McKim Garrison, was inspired by his work among the freedmen and the first book of its kind ever published.
