= Joe Allen (disambiguation) =

Joe Allen (born 1990) is a Welsh international footballer.

Joe Allen may also refer to:

- Joe Allen (footballer, born 1909) (1909–1978), English footballer
- Joe Allen (painter) (born 1955), British artist
- Joe Allen (restaurant), Broadway restaurant opened in 1965
- Joe Allen (basketball) (1945–1997), American basketball player

== See also ==
- Joey Allen (sailor), New Zealand sailor
- Jo Allen (disambiguation)
- Joseph Allen (disambiguation)
