= James Wallace Black =

American photographer (1825–1896)

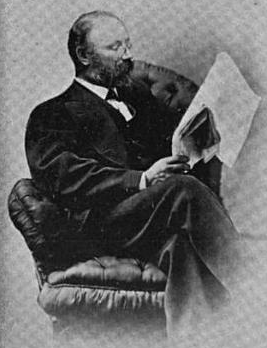
- Born: February 10, 1825; Francestown, New Hampshire, US
- Died: January 5, 1896 (aged 70); Cambridge, Massachusetts, US
- Resting place: Mount Auburn Cemetery

James Wallace Black (February 10, 1825 – January 5, 1896), known professionally as J.W. Black, was an early American photographer whose career was marked by experimentation and innovation.

== Biography ==
He was born on February 10, 1825, in Francestown, New Hampshire.

After trying his luck as a painter in Boston, he turned to photography, beginning as a daguerreotype plate polisher. He soon partnered with John Adams Whipple, a prolific Boston photographer and inventor. Black's photograph of abolitionist John Brown in 1859, the year of his insurrection at Harpers Ferry, is now in the National Portrait Gallery, Smithsonian Institution.

In March 1860, Black took a photograph of poet Walt Whitman when Whitman was in Boston to oversee the typesetting of his 1860 edition of Leaves of Grass. Black's studio at 173 Washington Street was less than a block from the publishing firm of Thayer and Eldridge, who apparently commissioned the photograph to promote the 1860 edition.

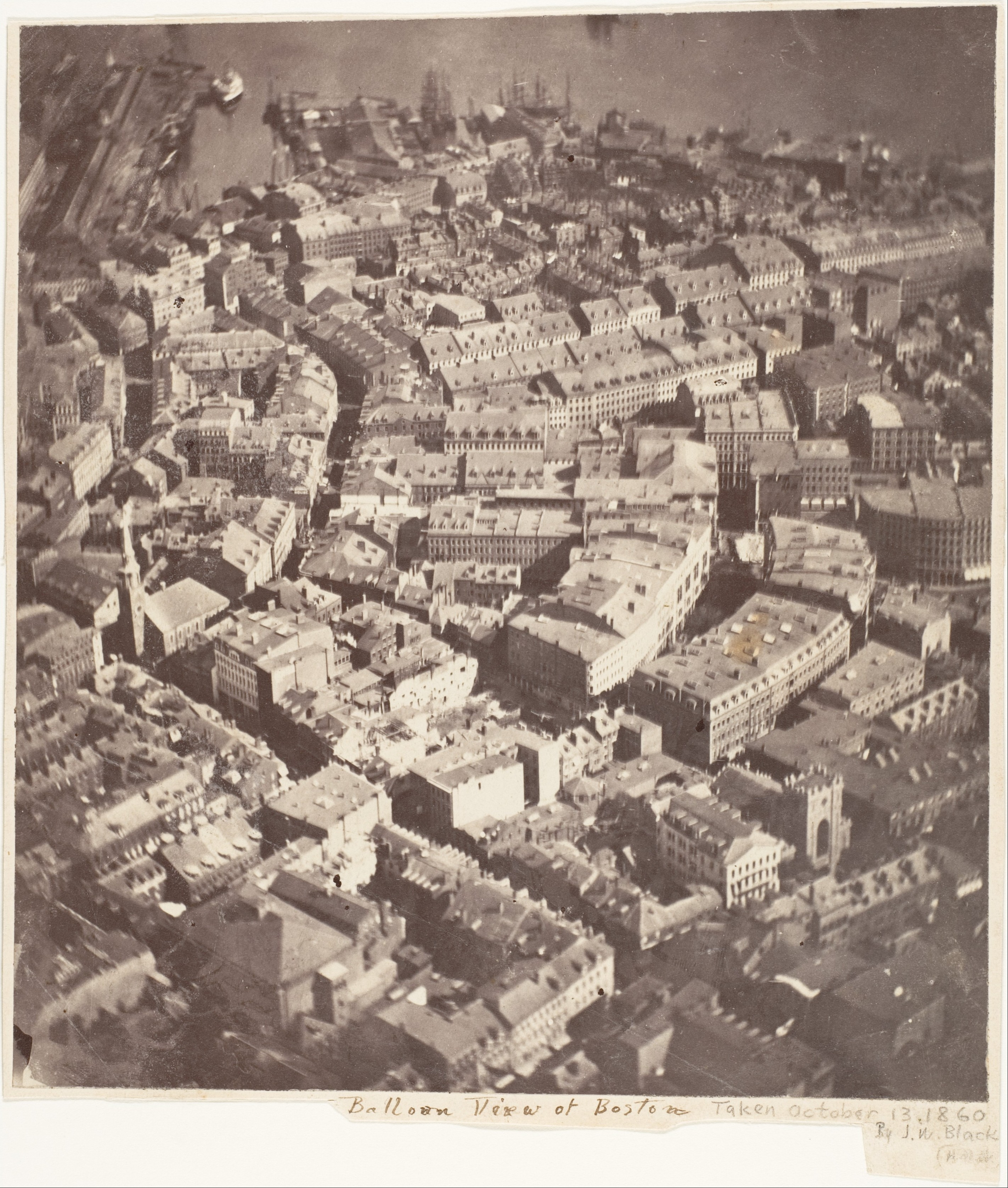
Boston, as the Eagle and the Wild Goose See It

On October 13, 1860, two years after the French photographer Nadar conducted his earliest experiments in balloon flight, Black made the first successful aerial photographs in the United States in collaboration with the balloon navigator Samuel Archer King on King's hot-air balloon, the Queen of the Air. He photographed Boston from a hot-air balloon at 1,200 feet (370 m), taking 8 plates of glass negative measuring 10 1/16 by 7 15/16 inches (256 mm × 202 mm). One good print resulted, which the photographer entitled Boston, as the Eagle and the Wild Goose See It. This was the first clear aerial image of a city.

Almost immediately, aerial reconnaissance would be put to use by the Union and Confederate Armies during the American Civil War, though there is no credible evidence that aerial photography was successful.

Black later became the authority on the use of the magic lantern, a candlelight-powered projector that was a predecessor of today's slide projectors. By the late 1870s Black's business largely consisted of lantern slide production, including his famous images of the Great Boston Fire of 1872, published a photographic album titled Ruins of the Great Fire in Boston, November 1872.

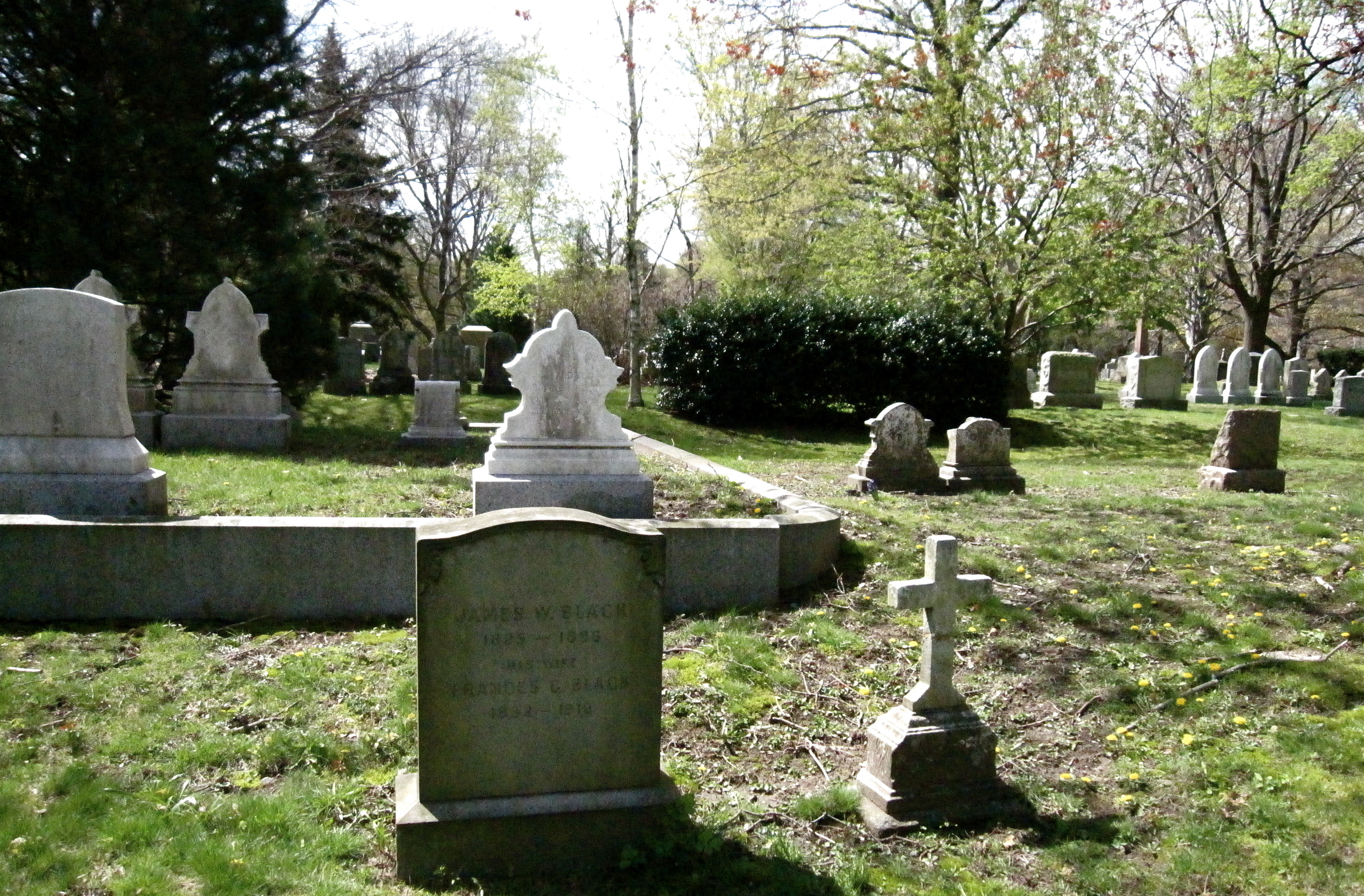
Marker for J.W. Black, Mt. Auburn Cemetery

He died on January 5, 1896, and was buried in Mount Auburn Cemetery in Cambridge, Massachusetts.

== Collections of his work ==
- Boston Athenaeum
- Boston Public Library
- George Eastman House
- Historic New England
- Massachusetts Historical Society
- Metropolitan Museum of Art, New York City

== Image gallery ==
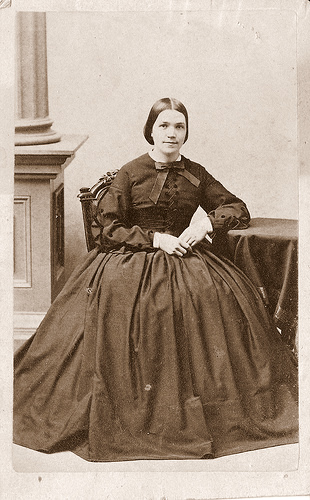
Sarah Fuller, c1860s

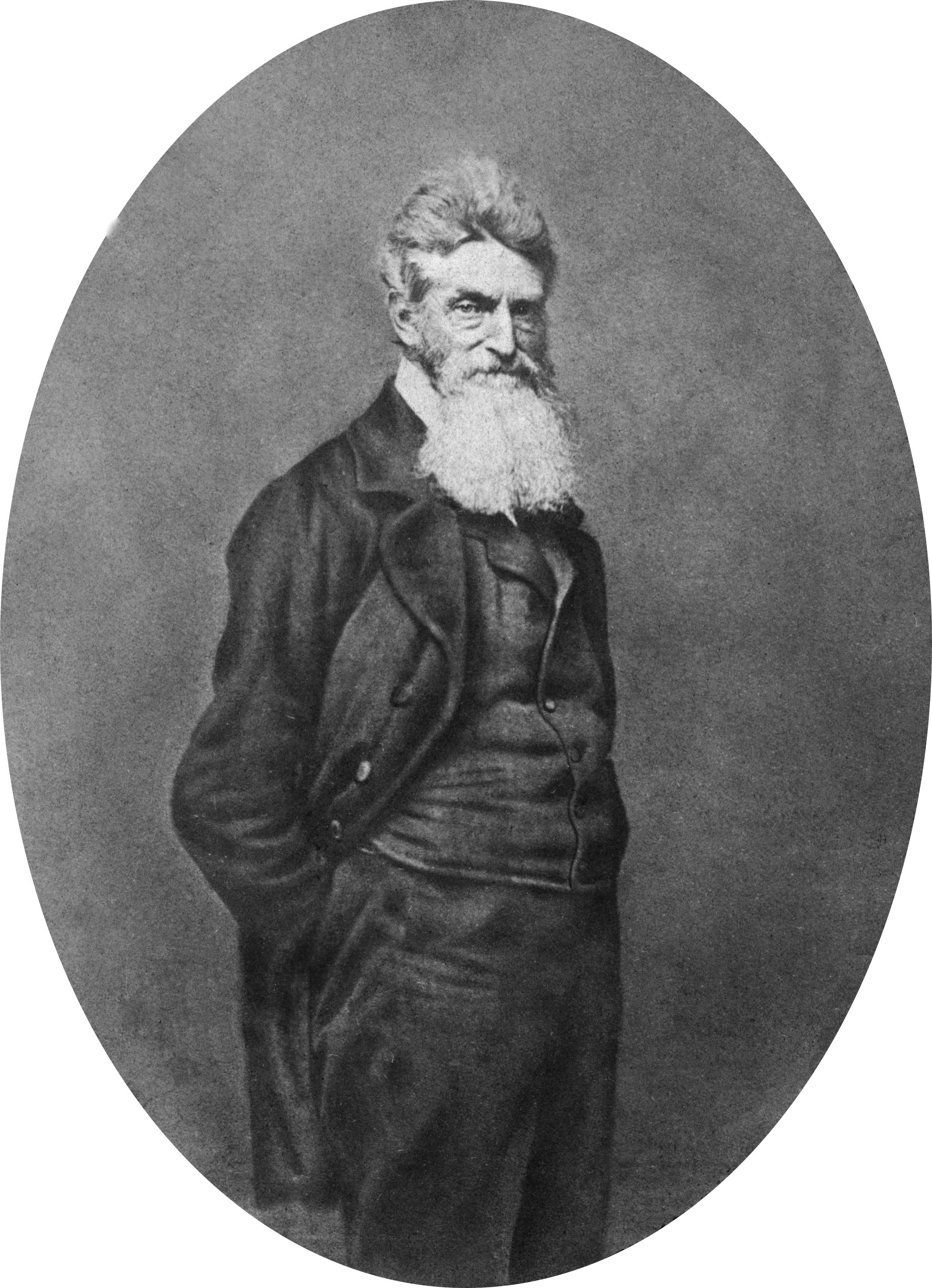
John Brown, 1859

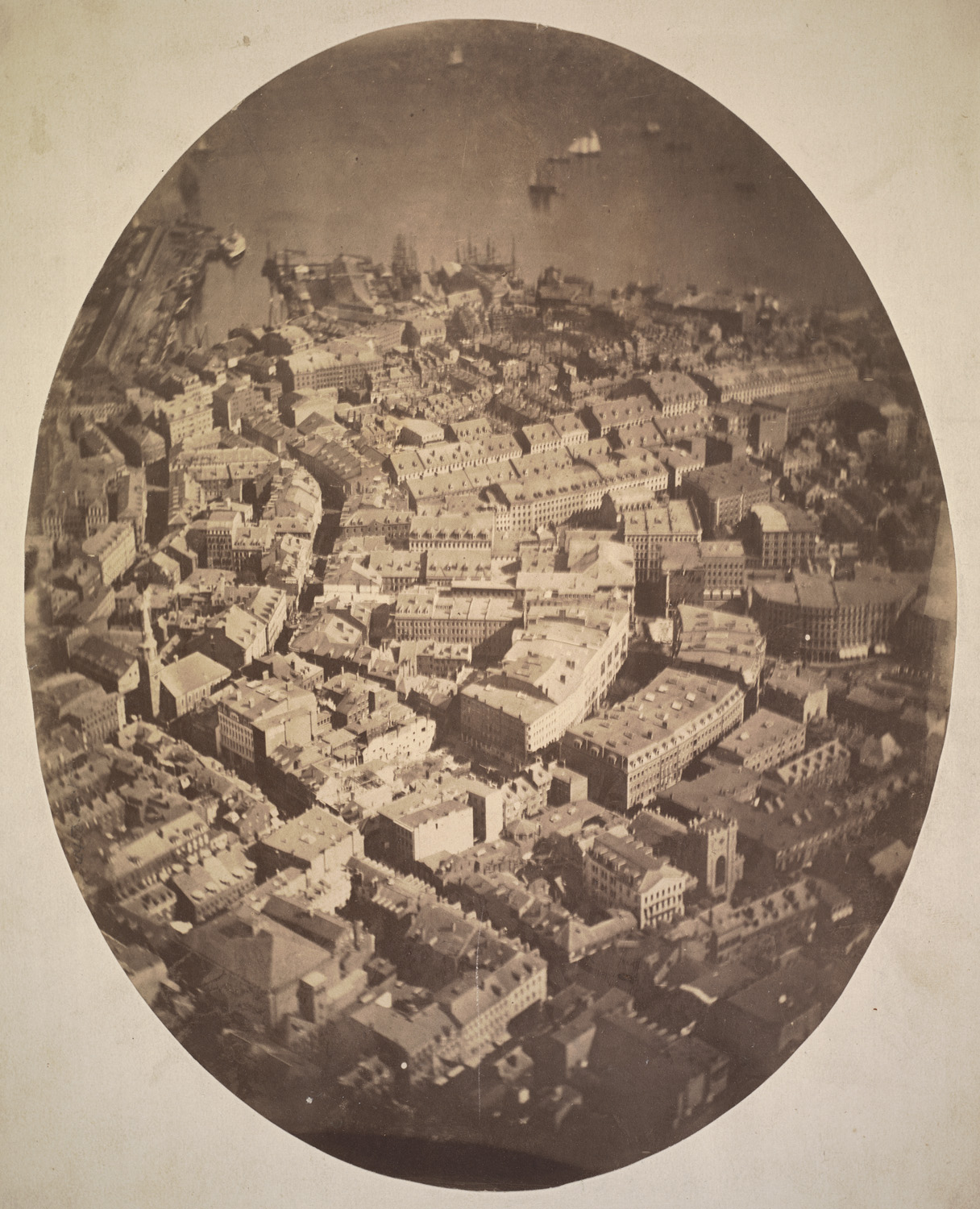
1860 photograph of Boston taken by Wallace from a tethered balloon

Portrait of noted American poet Walt Whitman, by photographer James Wallace Black, March 1860

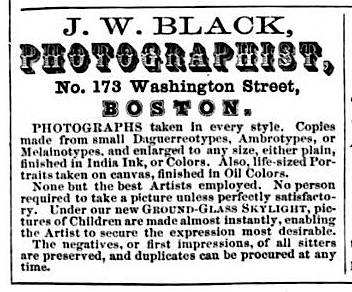
Advertisement, Boston Directory 1862

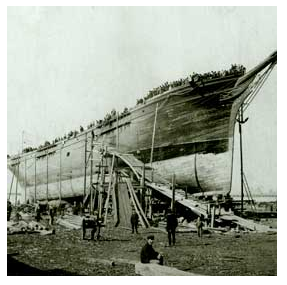
Glory of the Seas in shipyard of Donald McKay, 1869

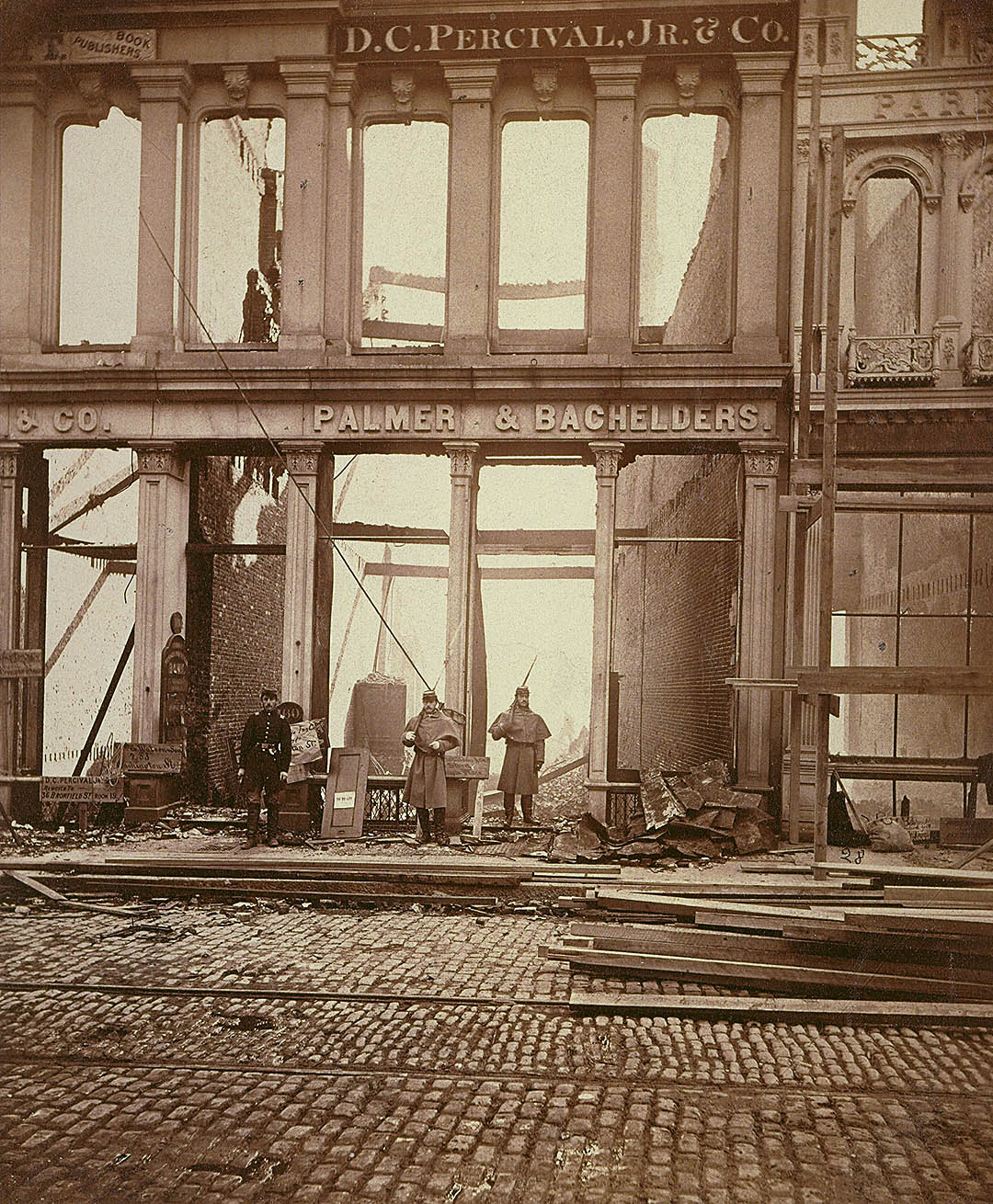
After the Boston Fire, Washington Street. 1872
