= Northborough, Massachusetts =

- Town
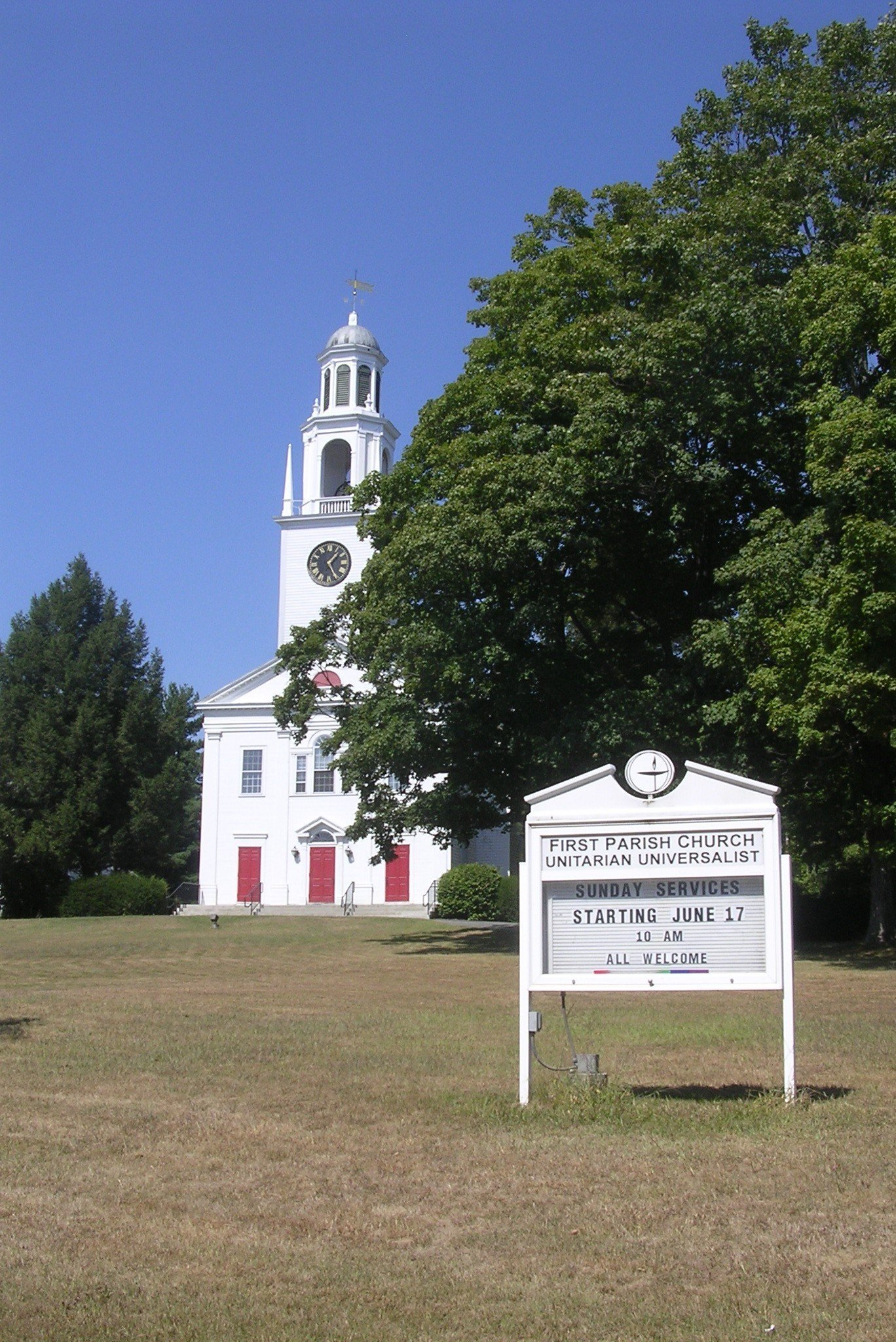
- First Parish Church

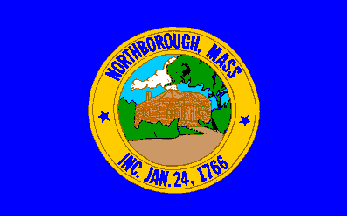
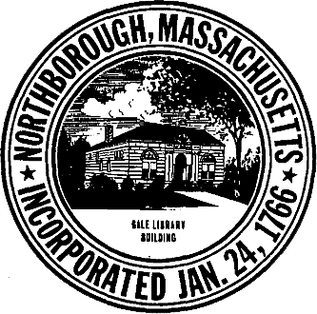
- Flag Seal

- Location in Worcester County and the state of Massachusetts.
- Coordinates: 42°19′10″N 71°38′30″W
- Country: United States
- State: Massachusetts
- County: Worcester
- Settled: 1672
- Incorporated: 1766

Government
  - Type: Open town meeting
  - Town Administrator: John W. Coderre
  - Board of Selectmen: Mitch Cohen, Chair; Laura Ziton, Vice Chair; Laura Ziton, Clerk; Julianne Hirsch; Lisa Maselli

Area
  - Total: 18.8 sq mi (48.6 km^{2})
  - Land: 18.5 sq mi (48.0 km^{2})
  - Water: 0.23 sq mi (0.6 km^{2})
- Elevation: 299 ft (91 m)

Population (2020)
  - Total: 15,741
  - Density: 849/sq mi (328/km^{2})
- Demonym: Northboroners
- Time zone: UTC−5 (Eastern)
  - Summer (DST): UTC−4 (Eastern)
- ZIP Code: 01532
- Area code: 508 / 774
- FIPS code: 25-46820
- GNIS feature ID: 0618375
- Website: https://www.northboroughma.gov/

Northborough is a town in Worcester County, Massachusetts, United States. The official spelling of the town's name is "Northborough," but the alternative spelling "Northboro" is also used. The population was 15,741 at the 2020 census. It contains the census-designated place of the same name.

== History ==
The areas surrounding Northborough were first settled by the Nipmuc people. Europeans set up a plantation on May 14, 1656, following a petition for resettlement from the people of the Sudbury Plantation to the General Court of the Bay Colony. On January 23, 1766, the district of Northborough was established within neighboring Westborough. On August 23, 1775, the district became a town, and on June 20, 1807, part of neighboring Marlborough was annexed to Northborough.

The first meeting house was established in 1746, with the legal governor of the town being called the Town Minister. The first Town Minister was Reverend John Martyn.

In 1775, Northborough split off as the "north borough" of Westborough, much as Westborough had split from Marlborough some 58 years before. However, the two towns shared a meetinghouse for some time more.

== Geography ==
According to the United States Census Bureau, the town has a total area of 18.8 square miles (49 km^{2}), of which 18.5 square miles (48 km^{2}) is land and 0.2 square miles (0.52 km^{2}), or 1.17%, is water. On average, the town is about 302 feet (92 meters) above sea level.

=== Adjacent towns and cities ===
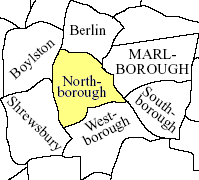

Northborough is located in Central Massachusetts, and shares a border with five towns and one city:

- Southborough is located to the southeast. The border, however, is only 500 yards long and is in the woods with no accessible trail.
- Marlborough is located to the north of Southborough and due east of Northborough. The most accessible way to enter Marlborough from Northborough is via U.S. Route 20.
- Berlin is located to the north of Northborough.
- Boylston is located to the northwest.
- Shrewsbury is located to the west, and is the town that separates Northborough from Worcester. Shrewsbury is accessible via Route 20 or Route 9.
- Westborough is located to the south of Northborough, and is accessible via Route 9 or Route 135

Of the six towns that make up Northborough's borders, and including Northborough as the seventh, Northborough is the fourth largest town by population. Marlborough is the largest while Berlin is the smallest.

== Demographics ==
Historical population
Year	Pop.	±%
1790	619	—
1860	1,565	+152.8%
1870	1,504	−3.9%
1880	1,676	+11.4%
1890	1,952	+16.5%
1900	2,164	+10.9%
1910	1,713	−20.8%
1920	1,753	+2.3%
1930	1,946	+11.0%
1940	2,382	+22.4%
1950	3,122	+31.1%
1960	6,687	+114.2%
1970	9,218	+37.8%
1980	10,568	+14.6%
1990	11,929	+12.9%
2000	14,013	+17.5%
2010	14,155	+1.0%
2020	15,741	+11.2%
2024*	15,867	+0.8%
Source: United States Census records and Population Estimates Program data.

By the 2010 census, the population had reached 14155. By the 2020 census, the population was 15,741.

According to recent census estimates, there were approximately 5,700 households residing in the town. The population density was about 850 inhabitants per square mile (328/km²). There were roughly 5,900 housing units at an average density of about 315 per square mile (122/km²).

The racial makeup of the town was approximately 79% White, 2% Black or African American, 0.1% Native American, 15% Asian, and about 3% from two or more races. Hispanic or Latino of any race were about 4% of the population.

There were about 5,700 households, out of which approximately 40% had children under the age of 18 living with them, about 65% were married couples living together, around 8% had a female householder with no husband present, and about 22% were non-families. About 18% of all households were made up of individuals, and around 9% had someone living alone who was 65 years of age or older. The average household size was about 2.7 and the average family size was about 3.2.

In the town, the population was spread out, with about 25% under the age of 18, 6% from 18 to 24, 28% from 25 to 44, 28% from 45 to 64, and about 13% who were 65 years of age or older. The median age was approximately 41 years. For every 100 females, there were about 97 males.

The median income for a household in the town was approximately $150,000, and the median income for a family was about $175,000. The per capita income for the town was about $65,000. About 2% of families and around 3% of the population were below the poverty line, including roughly 2% of those under age 18 and about 5% of those age 65 or over.

== Government ==
State government
State Representative(s):	Meghan Kilcoyne (D), Danielle Gregoire (D)
State Senator(s):	Robyn Kennedy (D-1st Worcester district), Jamie Eldridge (D)
Governor's Councilor(s):	Jen Caissie (R), Marilyn M. Petitto Devaney (D)
Federal government
U.S. Representative(s):	2nd District
U.S. Senators:	Elizabeth Warren (D), Ed Markey (D)

== Library ==
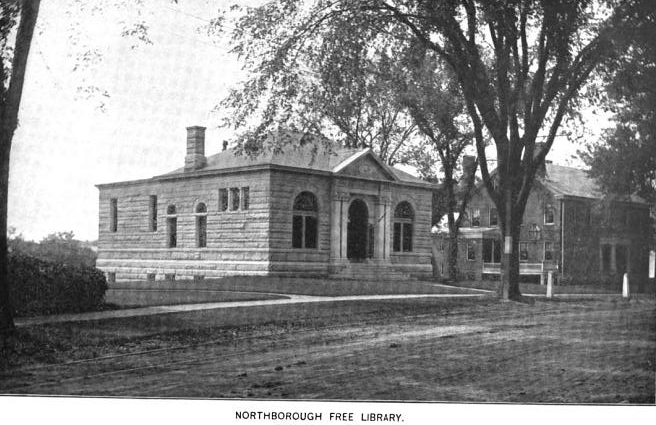
Northborough public library, 1899

The Northborough Free Library was established in 1868. In fiscal year 2009, the town of Northborough spent 1.5% ($645,208) of its budget on its public library—approximately $43.41 per person, per year ($53.36 adjusted for inflation to 2021).

== Education ==
=== Public schools ===
The Northborough-Southborough Public School District is home to four public elementary schools serving grades pre-kindergarten through grade 5. They include Lincoln Street School, Marguerite E. Peaslee School, Fannie E. Proctor School, and Marion E. Zeh school.

In 2002, the Northborough Middle School was renamed after former superintendent of schools, Robert E. Melican.

The public high school serving Northborough is Algonquin Regional High School, and is shared with Southborough. The mascot for Northborough-Southborough students was the Tomahawk, but was officially changed to the Titans in early 2022. Debates have erupted over whether Northborough and Southborough should have separate high schools; however, citizens of both Northborough and Southborough successfully fought to keep the school regionalized. Assabet Valley Regional Technical High School is an alternate choice for Northborough students.

=== Private schools ===
Private schools include The Cornerstone Academy, a private elementary school, and Saint Bernadette School, a private Roman Catholic elementary and middle school.

== Sports ==
The New England Baseball Complex is located at the intersection of Route 20 and Route 9 in Northborough. The newly built complex is home to the New England Ruffnecks, a youth baseball association. Many high schools, including Algonquin have had MIAA games at the NEBC. Regional colleges and universities have hosted opponents at the New England Baseball Complex. Their little league of Algonquin shared with Southborough is open to any children. The local middle school, Robert E. Melican Middle School, has sports teams for 7th graders and up.

== Notable people ==
- Joseph Allen, pastor
- Joseph Henry Allen, (August 21, 1820 – March 20, 1898) Unitarian minister and scholar
- William Francis Allen, (September 5, 1830 – December 9, 1899) classical scholar
- Andy Byron, former Astronomer CEO caught in the Coldplay Kiss Cam Scandal
- Mark Fidrych, (August 14, 1954 – April 13, 2009), former pitcher for the Detroit Tigers and 1976 American League Rookie of the Year
- John Kellette, (June 1873 – August 7, 1922) an American songwriter, wrote the song "I'm Forever Blowing Bubbles" in 1918
- Dorian McMenemy, (born October 28, 1996) Olympic swimmer for the Dominican Republic
- Gregory Goodwin Pincus, (April 9, 1903 – August 22, 1967) one of the three "fathers" of the birth control pill
- Jon Radoff, (born September 17, 1972) internet entrepreneur and author
- Nathaniel Raymond, (born November 11, 1977) an American human rights investigator, specializing in the investigation of war crimes
- Luther Rice, (25 March 1783 – 27 September 1836) American Baptist minister and founder of George Washington University
- Mike Sherman, (born December 19, 1954) coach of the Montreal Alouettes of the Canadian Football League; former head coach of the Green Bay Packers
- Shion Takeuchi, film maker
- Daniel Baird Wesson, (May 18, 1825 – August 4, 1906) American inventor and firearms designer; co-founder of the Smith & Wesson gun manufacturing company

== Media ==
=== Newspapers ===
- Metrowest Daily News
- Worcester Telegram and Gazette
- Community Advocate
- Northborough/Southborough Villager (weekly)
- Northborough Patch (online)
