= St. Mary's Episcopal Church (Newton Lower Falls, Massachusetts) =

Historic church in Massachusetts, United States

- St. Mary's Episcopal; Church and Cemetery
- U.S. National Register of Historic Places
- U.S. Historic district – Contributing property
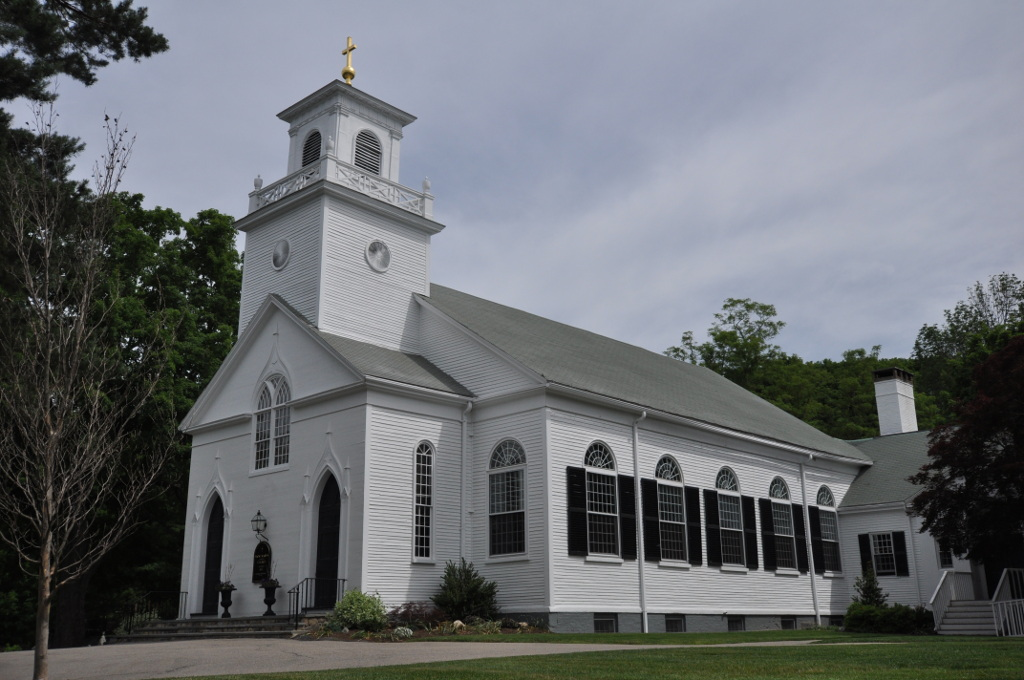
- St. Mary's Episcopal Church, 2014

- Location within Massachusetts Location within the United States
- Location: 258 Concord Street; Newton Lower Falls, Massachusetts
- Coordinates: 42°19′34″N 71°15′29″W
- Built: 1814
- Part of: Newton Lower Falls Historic District (ID86001748)
- NRHP reference No.: 80000637

Significant dates
- Added to NRHP: May 14, 1980
- Designated CP: September 4, 1986

St. Mary's Episcopal Church and Cemetery is a historic church and cemetery at 258 Concord Street, in the village of Newton Lower Falls, Massachusetts, United States. St. Mary's Parish was formed in 1811. The church, built in 1813–14 and restyled in 1838, is the oldest church in Newton, and is a fine example of Gothic Revival/Federal style architecture. The cemetery, which dates from 1812, is the oldest non-government-owned cemetery in Newton. The property was listed on the National Register of Historic Places in 1980.

The church reported 407 members in 2015 and 247 members in 2023; no membership statistics were reported in 2024 parochial reports. Plate and pledge income reported for the congregation in 2024 was $299,028 with average Sunday attendance (ASA) of 55 persons.

== Architecture and history ==
St. Mary's Church is set just north of Washington Street (Massachusetts Route 16) between Concord and Grove Streets. It is a single-story wood-frame building, with a gable roof, clapboard siding, and a brick foundation. Its square tower rises above a gabled entry pavilion that projects from the center of the west-facing facade. The pavilion has two entrances, each flanked by pilasters and topped by a Gothic-arched transom. A central window placed high has a trefoil pattern. Most of the building's remaining windows are sash windows topped by half-round transoms. The tower rising above the pavilion begins with a square section with oculus windows on each side, topped by a smaller belfry with Gothic-arched louvers and a railing with pinnacled corner posts. These details are repeated at a smaller scale above the belfry. Notable features of the church interior are its original high box pews, choir loft and plain glass windows. The plain chancel was added in 1922.

The church was built in 1813–14, as a Federal style structure, and was extensively altered in 1838, lengthening it to the rear by 16 feet (4.9 m), and restyling the tower with Gothic features. In 1954 the tower was again rebuilt, removing Gothic features in a bid to return the church to a more Federal appearance. The land for the church was purchased by Samuel Brown, a wealthy Boston merchant who had established one of the paper mills in Newton Lower Falls, and he also donated funds toward the building's construction.

== Current status ==
St. Mary's Episcopal Church serves Newton Lower Falls, Wellesley Hills across the Charles River and surrounding areas and is a parish in the Episcopal Diocese of Massachusetts. It holds two regular services on Sunday mornings and has a well-known choral music program. Its current rector is the Reverend Ann Bonner Stewart, succeeding the Reverend Doctor Paul Kolbet.

== Notable burials in churchyard ==
- Josiah Gardner Abbott, 1814–1891, member of the United States House of Representatives from Massachusetts.
- Lewis Golding Arnold, 1817–1871, Civil War general.
- Sarah Fuller, 1836–1927, founder of the Horace Mann School for the Deaf and Hard of Hearing
- Zibeon Hooker, 1752–1840, Drummer at the Battle of Bunker Hill
- Horatio William Parker, 1863–1919, American composer.
- Charles Rice, 1787–1863, brigadier general in the Massachusetts Militia and Massachusetts state representative.

== See also ==
- National Register of Historic Places listings in Newton, Massachusetts
- Beverly E. Hurney, Saint Mary's Cemetery Newton, Massachusetts: Epitaphs (Boston: New England Historic Genealogical Society, 2000).
