= West Newton English and Classical School =

Coordinates: 42°21′1″N 71°13′43″W

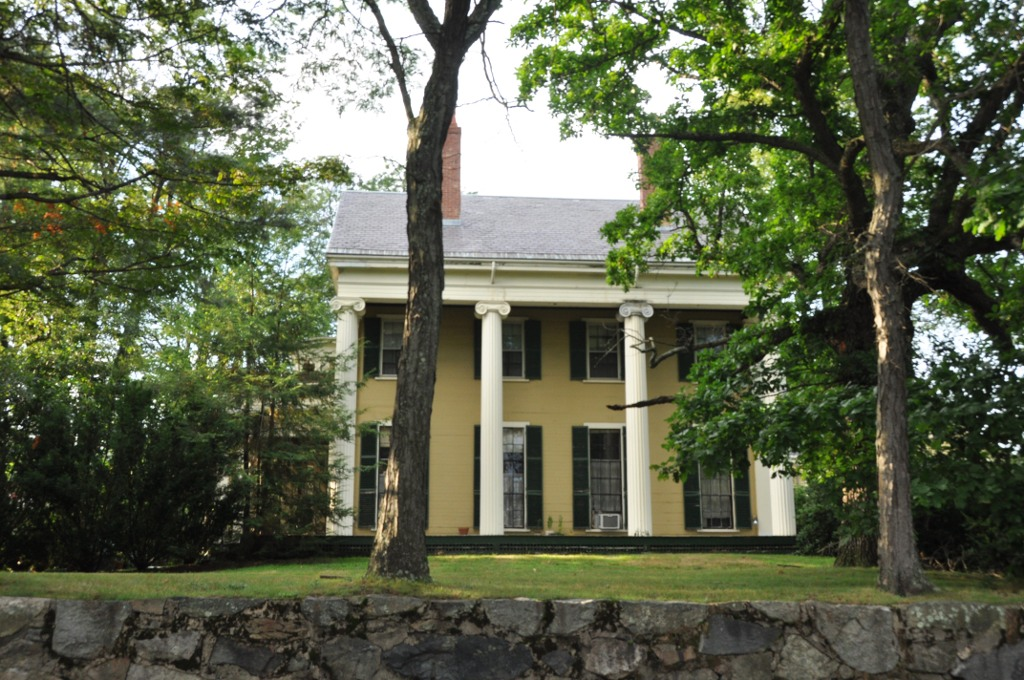
Nathaniel Topliff Allen Homestead, where the West Newton English and Classical School was located beginning 1854.

West Newton English and Classical School, also known as the Allen School, was a model school in West Newton, Massachusetts, United States. It was established in 1854 by Nathaniel Topliff Allen (1823–1903), an educator and protege of Horace Mann. Allen was an advocate of women's suffrage, temperance, and the abolition of slavery, and his school, unusual at the time, had a racially integrated, co-educational student body. It offered a kindergarten program based upon the principles of Froebel's Kindergarten System, and included gymnastics in its curriculum, both of which were, in America, educational innovations. The school's coursework included reading, spelling, arithmetic, geography, geology, and bookkeeping. Daily journals kept by students were critiqued every two weeks. The school also taught art, music, dancing and ethics. Students attended lectures by guest speakers such as Theodore Parker, William Lloyd Garrison, and Ralph Waldo Emerson. Many of Allen's relatives, including his uncles, brothers, cousins, nieces, and three daughters, lived and taught at the school, and provided lodging in their homes for students.

Over the course of its 50 years in existence, more than 5,000 students attended the school. Students came from all over the world, and many graduates, both men and women, went on to have careers in medicine, law, government, and education.

== Notable alumni ==
- Rebecca Lee Crumpler (1831–1895), the first African-American woman to become a physician in the United States. She received her medical degree in 1864 from the New England Female Medical College.
- Sarah Fuller (1836–1927), educator of the deaf, who worked with Alexander Graham Bell and Helen Keller.
- Authur May Knapp (1841–1921), missionary and the author of Feudal and Modern Japan.
- Elizabeth Piper Ensley (1847–1919), educator, suffragette, and activist.
- Webster Wells (1851–1916), mathematician, educator, and author.
- Joseph Morrill Wells (1853–1890), architect.
- Mary Ann Greene (1857–1936), lawyer.
- Henry E. Warren (1872–1957), inventor and businessman.

== Notable staff ==
- William Francis Allen, assistant principal in 1856.
