= Newton Lower Falls Historic District =

Historic district in Massachusetts, United States

- U.S. National Register of Historic Places
- U.S. Historic district
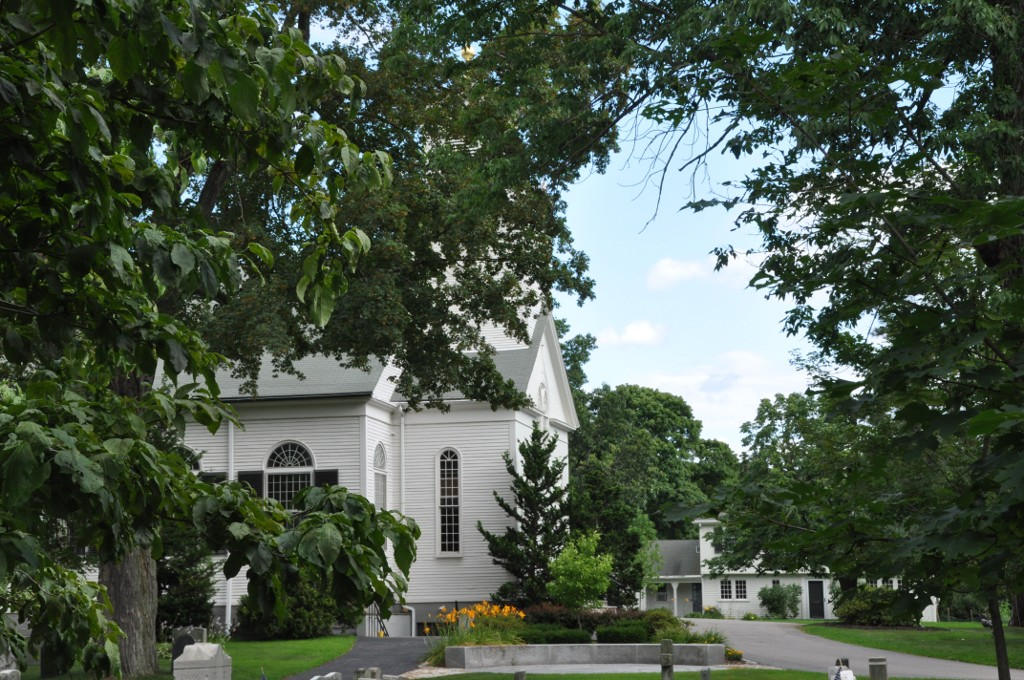
- view on Concord Street

- Location within Massachusetts Location within the United States
- Location: Roughly bounded by Hagar, Grove, Washington, and Concord Sts., Newton, Massachusetts
- Coordinates: 42°19′35″N 71°15′29″W
- Architect: Jones, Vaughn
- Architectural style: Greek Revival, Renaissance
- MPS: Newton MRA
- NRHP reference No.: 86001748
- Added to NRHP: September 04, 1986

The Newton Lower Falls Historic District encompasses the historic colonial village center of Newton Lower Falls, on the west side of Newton, Massachusetts. This area lies north of Washington Street, along Concord and Grove Streets, between Washington and Hagar Streets. The district was listed on the National Register of Historic Places in 1986.

The "lower falls" of the Charles River were an important geographic even before colonial days, because a Native American path traversed the area (roughly along the Washington Street alignment). In the 17th century the waterpower of the falls was already being harnessed by English colonists for the operation of gristmills and sawmills. Permanent residency on the Newton side of the river did not begin until the early 18th century, when an iron works was established. The oldest surviving house in the area is at 2345 Washington Street, built c. 1755. The residential portion of the village developed on the rise above the river, where St. Mary's Episcopal Church was built c. 1813; it is separately listed on the National Register. Adjacent to the church, a number of Greek Revival houses were built on Grove Street during the 1830s and 1840s, the height of the area's economically significant paper industry. The last significant construction in the district was the hose house (fire station) at 677 Grove Street in 1900.

The historic portion of the village, once much larger, suffered a significant decline in the 20th century. Fashionable houses belonging to mill owners were demolished, as were more modest residences of mill workers, in some cases to make way for the construction of nearby Massachusetts Route 128. This intrusion also resulted in the destruction of a church and schools.

== See also ==
- National Register of Historic Places listings in Newton, Massachusetts
