= Joseph Allen (clergyman) =

American clergyman (1790–1873)

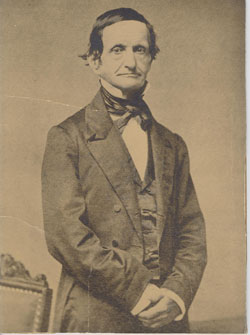
- Born: August 15, 1790; Medfield
- Died: February 23, 1873; Northborough
- Children: Joseph Henry Allen, William Francis Allen

Joseph Allen (August 15, 1790 – February 23, 1873) was an American Congregational clergyman. He was the father of authors Joseph Henry Allen and William Francis Allen.

Joseph Allen was born on August 15, 1790 in Medfield, Massachusetts. He graduated from Harvard in 1811, and was ordained pastor of the Congregational church at Northborough in 1816, which relation he sustained until his death. He was a delegate to the International Peace Congress of Paris in 1849. His published works include Historical Account of Northborough (1826), History of the Worcester Association (1868), and Allen Genealogy (1869), besides sermons, text-books, and Sunday-school books.

Joseph Allen died on February 23, 1873 in Northborough, Massachusetts.
