= Joseph P. Allen (psychologist) =

American psychologist and academic

- Born: 1958 (age 67–68)
- Children: 3
- Scientific career
- Workplaces: University of Virginia
- Website: psychology.as.virginia.edu/people/profile/jpa8r

Joseph P. Allen is an American psychologist and academic and the Hugh P. Kelly Professor of Psychology at the University of Virginia.

== Early life ==
Allen was born on October 30, 1958, in Washington, DC, and grew up in Oxon Hill, Maryland.

== Education ==
He received a B.A. in psychology from the University of Virginia in May 1980, and then a Ph.D. in Clinical/Community Psychology from Yale University in May 1986. He subsequently worked as a post-doctoral fellow in research at Harvard Medical School from 1986 until 1988.

== Achievements and Honors ==
Allen's work on The Connection Project has been written up in the New York Times and was recently cited by U. S. Surgeon General Vivek Murthy as a promising approach to enhancing connection among youth.

Allen has published three books and more than 200 academic articles, which have been cited more than 30,000 times in total. He is a recipient of awards for Lifetime Achievement in Research from both the Society for Research in Adolescence and the Bowlby/Ainsworth Attachment Society, as well as an NIH MERIT award for his research.

== Research ==
His research focuses on the predictors and long-term outcomes of social development processes from adolescence into adulthood and he is currently 25 years into a 30-year study on these topics. He also develops and examines socially-focused interventions for adolescents designed to improve long-term academic and mental health outcomes.

Together with Claudia W. Allen, he is the author of Escaping the Endless Adolescence: How We Can Help Our Teenagers Grow Up Before They Grow Old.. In 2016, he founded The Connection Project, a small group intervention for high school and college students that has been documented to reduce loneliness and depressive symptoms and enhance a sense of belonging. The program is now being implemented at the high school level by Wyman of St. Louis, and at the college level at the University of Virginia.

In September 2023, successful replication efforts for The Connection Project were begun at Georgetown University and Virginia Tech University.
