= Jo Allen =

Jo Allen may refer to:

- Jo Allen (academic administrator)
- Jo Allen (make-up artist), American make-up artist
- Jo Allen (animation producer), English animation producer
- Jo Harvey Allen (born 1945), American writer, actress, and artist

== See also ==
- Joe Allen (disambiguation)
