= Joseph Henry Allen =

American Unitarian clergyman and scholar

- Born: August 21, 1820; Northborough, Massachusetts
- Died: March 20, 1898 (aged 77); Cambridge, Massachusetts
- Education: Harvard College
- Occupations: Clergyman, editor, scholar

Joseph Henry Allen (August 21, 1820 – March 20, 1898) was a Unitarian clergyman, editor and scholar.

== Biography ==
He was born in Northborough, Massachusetts, the son of Joseph Allen and Lucy Clark. He prepared for college at a school run by his father in Northborough. He graduated at Harvard College, and then at the Divinity School in 1843. He was pastor at the First Congregational Society in Jamaica Plain, Massachusetts (1843), the Unitarian church in Washington, D.C. (1847), and a church in Bangor, Maine (1850). In 1857 he departed from full-time ministry and took up teaching (in Jamaica Plain, Northborough and West Newton) and editing Unitarian periodicals (Christian Examiner, 1863-5; Unitarian Review, 1887-1891). He lectured at Harvard for four years (1887-1891).

He died at his home in Cambridge, Massachusetts on March 20, 1898.

== Works ==
- Ten Discourses on Orthodoxy (1849)
- Hebrew Men and Times (to the Christian era), (Boston, 1861)
- Manual Latin Grammar (1868)
- A Latin Reader (with his brother William Francis Allen; 1869)
- A Latin Primer (1870)
- Our Liberal Movement in Theology, chiefly as Shown in Recollections of the History of Unitarianism in New England (1882)
- Christian History in its Three Great Periods, (1) Early Christianity, (2) The Middle Age, (3) Modern Phases (three volumes, 1882–83)
- Historical Sketch of the Unitarian Movement since the Reformation, (New York, 1894).

Latin manuals he prepared with James B. Greenough were familiar to high school students.
