= Nathaniel Topliff Allen Homestead =

Historic house in Massachusetts, United States

- U.S. National Register of Historic Places
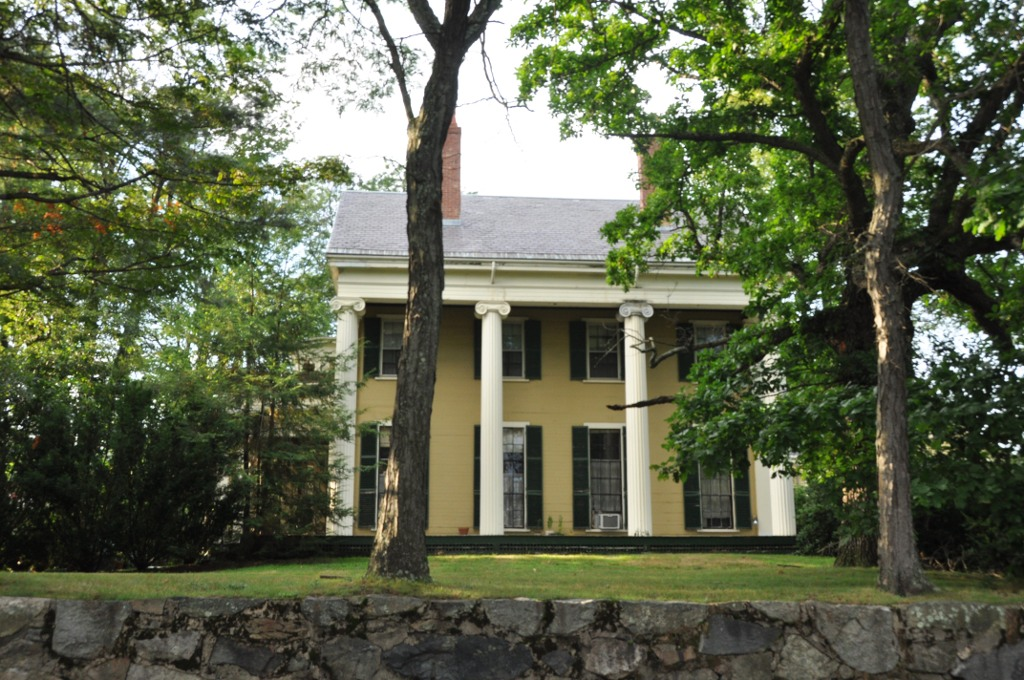

- Location within Massachusetts Location within the United States
- Location: 35 Webster Street, Newton, Massachusetts
- Coordinates: 42°21′1″N 71°13′43″W
- Area: 12,494 square feet (building), 53,423 (land)
- Built: 1848
- Architectural style: Greek Revival
- NRHP reference No.: 78000457
- Added to NRHP: January 9, 1978

The Nathaniel Topliff Allen Homestead is a historic house at 35 Webster Street in the village of West Newton, in Newton, Massachusetts. The Greek Revival house is notable as the home of Nathaniel Topliff Allen (1823–1903), an innovative educator in the mid-19th century. Allen's pioneering work influenced the development of new teaching methods taught at the state normal school (established in Newton, now Framingham State University). The house is listed in the National Register of Historic Places, and is currently owned by Newton Cultural Alliance.

== Description and history ==
The Allen Homestead, located at the northeast corner of Webster and Cherry Streets in West Newton village, consists of three connected wood-frame structures: Allen's 2 1/2-story Greek Revival house with a temple front facing Webster Street, built about 1848–1852 (probably by Milo Lucas, a local builder); a two-story flat-roofed structure, built in the late 19th century as a dormitory; and a 2 1/2-story gable-roofed schoolhouse.

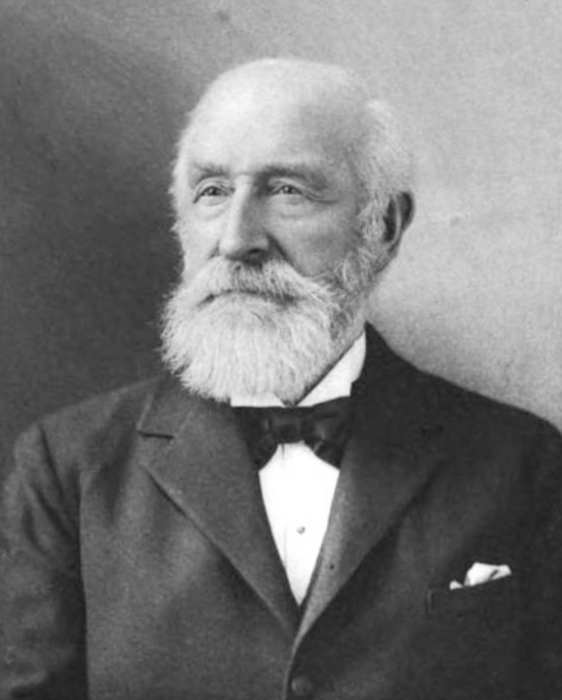
Nathaniel Topliff Allen

In 1847, Horace Mann, the Massachusetts Secretary of Education, hired Allen to operate a model school in Newton, where students could be taught using methods developed at the nearby Normal School. Allen had attended Rensselaer Polytechnic Institute and taught previously in a number of public high-schools before coming to West Newton. Allen's school became an internationally renowned showcase for teaching methods, and rapidly outgrew its facilities. When the Normal School moved to Framingham (becoming the school now known as Framingham State University), Allen purchased its building to continue running his school, West Newton English and Classical School. Allen's innovations included the first-ever kindergarten, and an emphasis on physical fitness, exemplified in part by the school's large (for the period) gymnasium.

Nathaniel Allen married Caroline Swift Bassett of Nantucket in 1853; their daughters also taught at the school.

== See also ==
- National Register of Historic Places listings in Newton, Massachusetts
