= Newton Lower Falls =

- Village
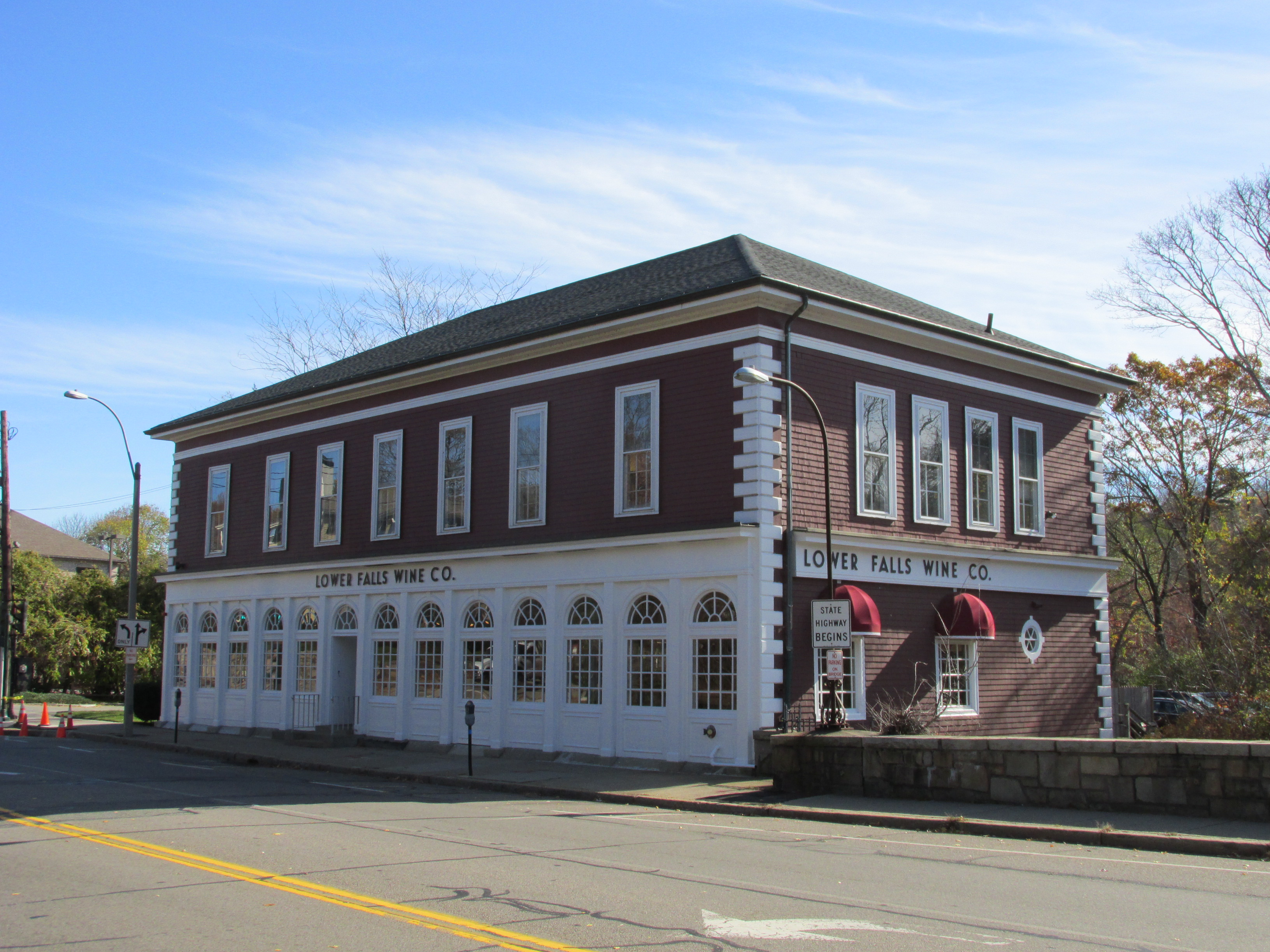
- Lower Falls Wine Company

- Location within Greater Boston area Location within Massachusetts Location within the United States
- Country: United States
- State: Massachusetts
- County: Middlesex
- City: Newton
- Elevation: 300 ft (91 m)
- Time zone: UTC-5 (Eastern (EST))
  - Summer (DST): UTC-4 (EDT)
- ZIP Code: 02462
- Area code: 617

Newton Lower Falls is one of the thirteen villages within the city of Newton in Middlesex County, Massachusetts, United States. The commercial area extends across the Charles River into Wellesley, where it is known as Wellesley Lower Falls, where a majority of the retail businesses are located.

The Charles River drops 18 feet over less than one-quarter mile at Lower Falls. A series of three small dams with fish ladders are located along the drop. The primary roads through the village of Lower Falls are Grove Street, Washington Street (Route 16), and Concord Street. The area is now a suburban neighborhood centered on the park at the old Hamilton elementary school (now Lower Falls Community Center), and bordered on the northwest by the Charles River and the Leo J. Martin public golf course. The historic heart of the Lower Falls village, St. Mary's Episcopal Church, and the adjacent residential area on Grove Street, are listed on the National Register of Historic Places as the Newton Lower Falls Historic District.

== Notable people ==
- Thomas Wilmer Dewing (1851–1938), a famous painter
- Sarah Fuller, educator and author who taught Helen Keller
- Arthur T. Gregorian, Oriental rug merchant
- Walter Montgomery Jackson (1863–1923), founder of encyclopedia publisher Grolier
- Kay Khan, Massachusetts state representative
- Anne Sexton, poet
- Michael Rosbash, Nobel Prize winner
- Francis Blake, who worked with Alexander Graham Bell

== Attractions ==
=== Historic landmarks ===
- William Curtis House (Newton, Massachusetts), 2330 Washington St.
- Newton-Wellesley Hospital, 2014 Washington St. The hospital's campus is listed on the National Register of Historic Places as the "Newton Cottage Hospital Historic District".
- Newton Lower Falls Historic District

=== Other ===
- Hamilton Playground (aka Lower Falls Community Center), 545 Grove St. The playground has two hard-surface tennis courts, plus a baseball field, basketball courts, a soccer field, and a softball field.
