= A Child of Our Time =

Oratorio composed by Michael Tippett

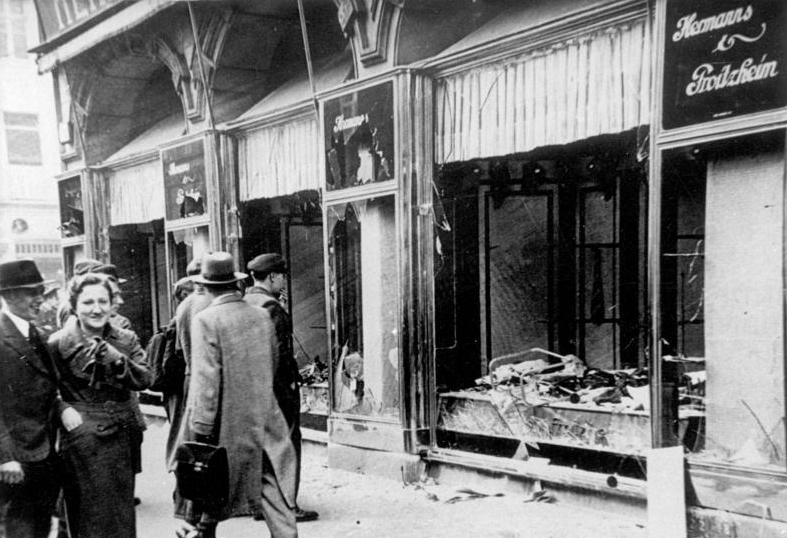
Passers-by observe a wrecked Jewish business in Magdeburg, Germany, after the Kristallnacht pogrom of 9 November 1938. Events surrounding the pogrom inspired Tippett to write A Child of Our Time.

A Child of Our Time is a secular oratorio by the British composer Michael Tippett, who also wrote the libretto. Composed between 1939 and 1941, it was first performed at the Adelphi Theatre, London, on 19 March 1944. The work was inspired by events that profoundly affected Tippett: the assassination of a German diplomat by a young Jewish refugee in 1938, and the Nazi government's reaction to the assassination which was in the form of a violent pogrom against Germany's Jewish population: Kristallnacht. Tippett's oratorio deals with these incidents in the context of the experiences of all oppressed people, and it carries a strongly pacifistic message of ultimate understanding and reconciliation. The text's recurrent themes of shadow and light reflect the Jungian psychoanalysis which Tippett underwent in the years immediately before he wrote the work.

The oratorio uses a traditional three-part format based on that of Handel's Messiah, and is structured in the manner of Bach's Passions. The work's most original feature is Tippett's use of African-American spirituals, which carry out the role allocated by Bach to chorales. Tippett justified this innovation on the grounds that these songs of oppression possess a universality absent from traditional hymns. A Child of Our Time was well received on its first performance, and has since been performed all over the world in many languages. A number of recorded versions are available, including one conducted by Tippett when he was 86 years old.

== Background and conception ==
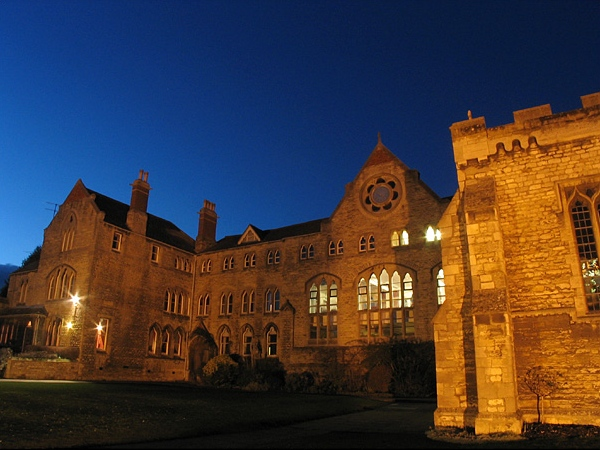
Stamford School (photographed in 2006), where Tippett's musical abilities first became apparent

Michael Tippett was born in London in 1905, to well-to-do though unconventional parents. His father, a lawyer and businessman, was a freethinker, his mother a writer and suffragette. He received piano lessons as a child, but first showed his musical prowess while a pupil at Stamford School in Lincolnshire, between 1920 and 1922. Although the school's formal music curriculum was slight, Tippett received private piano tuition from Frances Tinkler, a noted local teacher whose most distinguished pupil had been Malcolm Sargent, himself a former pupil at Stamford. Tippett's chance purchase in a local bookshop of Stanford's book Musical Composition led to his determination to be a composer, and in April 1923 he was accepted as a student at the Royal College of Music (RCM). Here he studied composition, first under Charles Wood (who died in 1926) and later, less successfully, with Charles Kitson. He also studied conducting, first under Sargent and later under Adrian Boult. He left the RCM in December 1928, but after two years spent unsuccessfully attempting to launch his career as a composer, he returned to the college in 1930 for a further period of study, principally under the professor of counterpoint, R. O. Morris.

In the economically depressed 1930s Tippett adopted a strongly left-wing political stance, and became increasingly involved with the unemployed, both through his participation in the North Yorkshire work camps, (Note: These camps were organised from 1932 by a prominent landowner and his wife, as a means of encouraging out-of-work miners to engage in self-help projects which included gardening, furniture making, music and drama.) and as founder of the South London Orchestra made up of out-of-work musicians. He was briefly a member of the British Communist Party in 1935, but his sympathies were essentially Trotskyist, inimical to the Stalinist orientation of his local party, and he soon left. In 1935 he embraced pacifism, but by this time he was becoming overtaken by a range of emotional problems and uncertainties, largely triggered by the break-up of an intense relationship with the painter Wilfred Franks. In addition to these personal difficulties he became anxious that the political situation in Europe was leading inexorably towards war. After meeting the Jungian psychoanalyst John Layard, Tippett underwent a period of therapy which included self-analysis of his dreams. According to Tippett's biographer Geraint Lewis, the outcome of this process was a "rebirth, confirming for Tippett the nature of his homosexuality while ... strengthening his destiny as a creative artist at the possible expense of personal relationships". The encounter with Layard led Tippett to a lifelong interest in the work and teaching of Carl Jung, an influence carried through into many of his subsequent compositions.

In the mid-to-late 1930s several of Tippett's early works were published, including his String Quartet No. 1, Sonata No. 1 for piano, and Concerto for Double String Orchestra. Among his unpublished output in these years were two works for voice: the ballad opera Robin Hood, written for performance at the Yorkshire work camps, and A Song of Liberty based on William Blake's "The Marriage of Heaven and Hell". In 1937, after completing A Song of Liberty, Tippett immediately began planning a large choral work on Jungian concepts titled Nekyia, which was to explore the theme of acknowledging the presence of both shadow and light within the personal and collective unconscious; the work foreshadowed some of the concepts used later in A Child of Our Time, but it was never completed. As his self-confidence increased, Tippett felt increasingly driven to write a work of overt political protest. In his search for a subject he first considered the Dublin Easter Rising of 1916: he may have been aware that Benjamin Britten had written incidental music to Montagu Slater's play Easter 1916. However, events towards the end of 1938 turned his attention away from Irish matters. Tippett had made several visits to Germany, and had acquired a love for its literature and culture. He became increasingly distressed by reports of events in that country and, in particular the persecution of its Jewish population. In November 1938 the assassination in Paris of a German diplomat, Ernst vom Rath, by Herschel Grynszpan, a 17-year-old Jewish refugee, precipitated the "Kristallnacht" pogrom across Germany. Over several days of violence synagogues were burned, Jewish homes and businesses attacked and destroyed, thousands of Jews were arrested, and some Jews were stoned or beaten to death. Reports from Germany of these events affected Tippett profoundly, and became the inspiration for his first large-scale dramatic work.

== Creation ==
=== Libretto ===
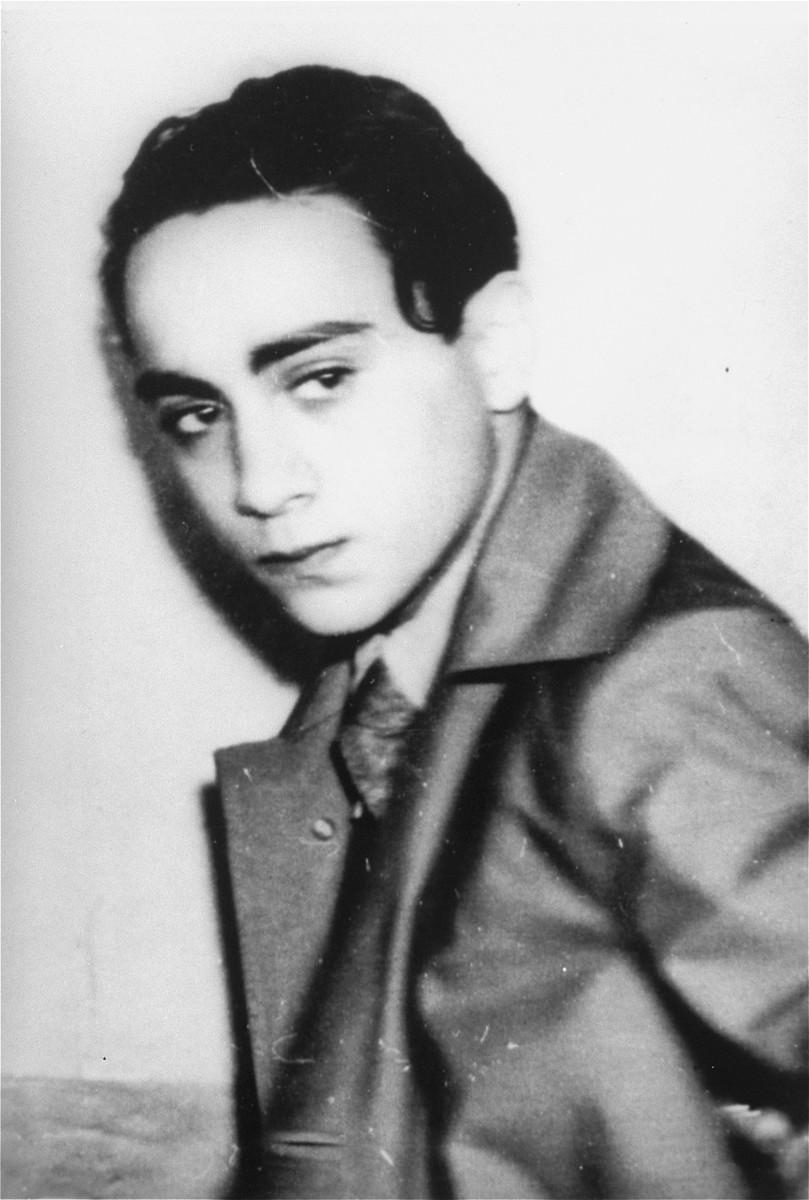
Herschel Grynszpan, whose actions formed the basis of A Child of Our Time

Having found his subject, Tippett sought advice on the preparation of the text from T. S. Eliot, whom he had met recently through a mutual friend, Francis Morley. The musicologist Michael Steinberg comments that, given his anti-Semitism, Eliot may have been an inappropriate choice of collaborator, though Tippett considered the poet his spiritual and artistic mentor, and felt that his counsel would be crucial. Tippett writes: "I plucked up courage and asked him if he would write it. Eliot said he would consider the matter as long as I provided him with a precise scheme of musical sections and an exact indication of the numbers and kinds of words for each stage". When Tippett produced his detailed draft, Eliot advised the composer to write his own libretto, suggesting that his own superior poetry would either distract attention from the music, or otherwise would be "swallowed up by it". Either way, there would be a mismatch. Tippett accepted this advice; henceforth, he records, he always wrote his own texts.

Tippett resolved that his work would be an oratorio rather than an opera. He chose the title from Ein Kind unserer Zeit, a contemporary protest novel by the Austro-Hungarian writer, Ödön von Horváth. The text that Tippett prepared follows the three-part structure used in Handel's Messiah, in which Part I is prophetic and preparatory, Part II narrative and epic, Part III meditative and metaphysical. In A Child of Our Time the general condition of oppression is defined in the first part, the narrative elements are confined to the second part, while the third part contains interpretation and reflection on a possible healing. Tippett perceived the work as a general depiction of man's inhumanity to man, and wanted Grynszpan's tragedy to stand for the oppressed everywhere. To preserve the universality of the work, Tippett avoids all use of proper names for people and places: thus, Paris is "a great city", Grynszpan becomes "the boy", the soprano is "the boy's mother", vom Rath is "the official". In addition to the broad themes of human oppression, Tippett's personal devastation at the end of his relationship with Wilfred Franks is woven into the libretto. At the time Tippett was writing the text, he was consumed by the break-up with Franks and felt "unable to come to terms with either the wretchedness of the separation or the emotional turmoil it let loose." As Tippett sought healing from his pain, Franks became a prominent figure in his Jungian dream analysis [during the first half of 1939] and the composer explained the image of Franks's shining face "appeared transformed in the alto aria in Part 3 of A Child of Our Time."

Commentators have identified numerous works as textual influences, including Eliot's Murder in the Cathedral and Ash Wednesday, Goethe's Faust and Wilfred Owen's poem "The Seed". Tippett's biographer Ian Kemp equates the ending of the oratorio to the closing pages of Part I of John Bunyan's Pilgrim's Progress, in which Christian and Hopeful end their journey by crossing a deep and wide river to reach their heavenly home. The influence of Jungian themes is evident in the recurrent images of darkness and light, and the recognition and balancing of opposites. In a recent analysis of the work, Richard Rodda finds A Child of Our Time "rooted in the essential dialectic of human life that Tippett so prized in Jung's philosophy—winter/spring, darkness/light, evil/good, reason/pity, dreams/reality, loneliness/fellowship, the man of destiny/the child of our time".

=== Composition ===
Tippett completed his Jungian psychoanalysis on 31 August 1939. Three days later, on the day that Britain declared war on Germany, he began composing A Child of Our Time. His grounding in the traditions of European music guided him instinctively towards the Passions of Bach as his basic musical model. Thus the building blocks of the work are familiar: recitatives, arias, choruses and ensembles, with a male soloist acting as a narrator and the chorus as full participants in the action. Tippett also introduced two other formal number types: the operatic scena and the orchestral interlude, the latter allowing time for reflection on significant events. Tippett wished to punctuate his work with an equivalent to the congregation chorales which recur in Bach's Passions; however, he wanted his work to speak to atheists, agnostics and Jews as well as to Christians. He considered briefly whether folk-songs, or even Jewish hymns, could provide an alternative, but rejected these because he felt that, like the chorales, they lacked universality. A solution was suggested to him when he heard on the radio a rendering of the spiritual "Steal away". In particular he was struck by the power of the words "The trumpet sounds within-a my soul". This led him to recognise spirituals as carrying an emotional significance far beyond their origin as slave songs in 19th-century America and as representing the oppressed everywhere.

Having found his substitute for the chorales, Tippett wrote off to America for a collection of spirituals. When this arrived, "I saw that there was one for every key situation in the oratorio". He chose five: "Steal Away"; "Nobody Knows the Trouble I See, Lord"; "Go Down, Moses"; "O, By and By"; and "Deep River". The first, fourth and fifth of these are placed at the ends of the oratorio's three parts, "Deep River" as the finale expressing, according to Tippett, the hope of a fresh spring after a long, dark winter. Kenneth Gloag, in his detailed analysis of the oratorio, writes: "As well as constructing the pathway through the dramatic narrative, the five spirituals also combine to provide moments of focus and repose ... giving shape to both the musical and literary dimensions of the work". Tippett felt that the work encapsulated all his current political, moral and psychological preoccupations.

== Synopsis and structure ==
According to Tippett's description, "Part I of the work deals with the general state of oppression in our time. Part II presents the particular story of a young man's attempt to seek justice by violence and the catastrophic consequences; and Part III considers the moral to be drawn, if any." He later extended his summary to the following:

- Part I: The general state of affairs in the world today as it affects all individuals, minorities, classes or races that are felt to be outside the ruling conventions. Man at odds with his Shadow (i.e. the dark side of personality).
- Part II: The "Child of Our Time" appears, enmeshed in the drama of his personal fate and the elemental social forces of our day. The drama is because the forces which drive the young man prove stronger than the good advice of his uncle and aunt, as it always was and always will be.
- Part III: The significance of this drama and the possible healing that would come from Man's acceptance of his Shadow in relation to his Light.

Part I

1. Chorus: "The world turns on its dark side"
2. The Argument (alto solo): "Man has measured the heavens", followed by an orchestral Interludium
3. Scena (chorus and alto solo): "Is evil then good?"
4. The Narrator (bass solo): "Now in each nation there were some cast out"
5. Chorus of the Oppressed: "When shall the usurer's city cease?"
6. Tenor solo: "I have no money for my bread"
7. Soprano solo: "How can I cherish my man?"
8. A Spiritual (chorus and soli): "Steal Away"

Part II

9. Chorus: "A star rises in midwinter"
10. The Narrator (bass solo): "And a time came"
11. Double Chorus of Persecutors and Persecuted: "Away with them!"
12. The Narrator (bass solo): "Where they could, they fled"
13. Chorus of the Self-righteous: "We cannot have them in our Empire"
14. The Narrator (bass solo): "And the boy's mother wrote"
15. Scena: The Mother (soprano), the Uncle and Aunt (bass and alto), and the Boy (tenor): "O my son!"
16. A Spiritual (chorus and soli): "Nobody knows the trouble I see"
17. Scena: Duet (bass and alto): "The boy becomes desperate"
18. The Narrator (bass solo): "They took a terrible vengeance"
19. Chorus: The Terror: "Burn down their houses!"
20. The Narrator (bass solo): "Men were ashamed"
21. A Spiritual of Anger (chorus and bass solo): "Go down, Moses"
22. The Boy Sings in his Prison (tenor solo): "My dreams are all shattered"
23. The Mother (soprano solo): "What have I done to you, my son?"
24. Alto solo: "The dark forces rise"
25. A Spiritual (chorus and soprano solo): "O by and by"

Part III

26. Chorus: "The cold deepens"
27. Alto solo: "The soul of man"
28. Scena (bass solo and chorus): "The words of wisdom"
29. General Ensemble (chorus and soli): "I would know my shadow and my light"
30. A Spiritual (chorus and soli): "Deep River"

== Conscientious objector ==
After the outbreak of war in September 1939, Tippett joined the Peace Pledge Union—with which he had been informally associated since 1935—and applied for registration as a conscientious objector, although his case was not considered by the tribunal until February 1942. In October 1940 he became director of music at Morley College, where the previous April he had conducted the South London Orchestra in the premiere of his Concerto for Double String Orchestra. After completing the composition of A Child of Our Time in 1941, Tippett worked on other projects, feeling that the oratorio's pacifist message was out of touch with the prevailing national mood. Walter Goehr, who conducted the Morley College orchestra, advised delaying its first performance until a more propitious time. In February 1942 Tippett was assigned by the tribunal to non-combative military duties. Following his appeal, this was changed to service either with Air Raid Precautions (ARP), with the fire service or on the land. He felt obliged to refuse these directions, and as a result was sentenced in June 1943 to three months' imprisonment, of which he served two months before his early release for good behaviour.

== Performance history and reception ==
=== Premiere ===
After his release from prison in August 1943, with encouragement from Britten and the youthful music critic John Amis, Tippett began to make arrangements for the oratorio's first performance. Goehr agreed to conduct, but overrode the composer's initial view that Morley College's orchestra could handle the work and insisted that professionals were needed. Tippett records that "somehow or other the money was scraped together to engage the London Philharmonic Orchestra". Morley College Choir's choral forces were augmented by the London Regional Civil Defence Choir. Britten's connection with Sadler's Wells Opera brought three soloists to the project: Joan Cross (soprano), Peter Pears (tenor), and Roderick Lloyd (bass). The fourth singer, Margaret MacArthur (alto), came from Morley College. The premiere was arranged for 19 March 1944, at London's Adelphi Theatre. Before this event Amis introduced the work in an article for the February 1944 issue of The Musical Times, in which he predicted a noteworthy musical occasion: "The general style of the oratorio is simple and direct, and the music will, I think, have an immediate effect on both audience and performers".

Later writers would state that A Child of Our Time placed Tippett in the first rank of the composers of his generation, and most of the early reviews were favourable. Among these, The Times's critic called the work "strikingly original in conception and execution", and wrote that Tippett had succeeded quite remarkably in writing an effective tract for the times. A second Times review, written a few days after the premiere, suggested that the oratorio had articulated a key contemporary question: "How is the conflict of the inevitable with the intolerable to be resolved?" It pointed to the hope expressed in the final spiritual, "Deep River", and concluded that despite some weak passages the work created a successful partnership between art and philosophy. William Glock in The Observer was laudatory: "The most moving and important work by an English composer for many years". Glock found that the spirituals suited the themes of the oratorio perfectly, and had been arranged "with a profound sense of beauty".

In The Musical Times Edwin Evans praised Tippett's text: "simple and direct ... he has wisely resisted any temptation to use quasi-biblical or 'Pilgrim's Progress' language." Evans was uncertain whether the music was truly reflective of the words: "the emotion seemed singularly cool under the provocations described in the text". Unlike Glock, Evans was unconvinced by the case for the inclusion of the spirituals: "[T]he peculiar poignancy they have in their traditional form tends to evaporate in their new environment". Eric Blom, in Music & Letters, thought the idea of using spirituals "brilliant", and the analogy with Bach's chorales convincing. Blom was less enthusiastic about the text, which he found "very terse and bald – rather poor, really"—though he thought this preferable to the pomposities such as those that characterise libretti written for Handel. In his autobiography, Tippett makes only muted references to the premiere, noting that the event "had some mixed reviews", but in a letter to his friend Francesca Allinson he professed himself delighted with the breadth of response to the work: "It's got over not only to the ordinary listeners but even to the intellectuals like [Mátyás] Seiber, who has written to me of some of the 'lovely texture of some of the numbers'".

=== Early performances ===
The generally positive reception of the premiere persuaded Arthur Bliss, then serving as the BBC's director of music, to arrange a broadcast performance of the work. This took place on 10 January 1945 shortly after which, in February, Tippett conducted the work at the Royal Albert Hall. The radio broadcast had been heard by Howard Hartog, a music writer and publisher who just after the war was in Occupied Germany, attempting to re-establish the North German Radio Symphony Orchestra in Hamburg. As part of this endeavour he decided to mount a performance of A Child of Our Time, with Hans Schmidt-Isserstedt conducting. Because of his pacifism and record as a conscientious objector, Tippett was not allowed into the occupied zone and thus missed the performance. However, in 1947 he was able to travel to Budapest where his friend, the Hungarian composer Mátyás Seiber, had organised a performance by Hungarian Radio. The local singers' problems with the English text meant that the work was sung in Hungarian, which Tippett, who conducted, described as "a very odd experience".

In the early 1950s Tippett attended a performance of the oratorio at the Radio Hall in Brussels, after which members of the audience expressed to him their gratitude for the work which, they said, exactly represented their wartime experiences. In December 1952 he travelled to Turin for a radio performance, conducted by Herbert von Karajan and with operatic stars Elisabeth Schwarzkopf and Nicolai Gedda among the soloists. He records that during the rehearsals the bass soloist, Mario Petri, had problems singing his recitatives, and that despite some coaching from the composer, was still "at sea" during the performance. Karajan asked Tippett if he would object to an extra interval in Part II, to which Tippett replied that he would mind very much. Karajan nevertheless imposed the break, thus presenting a four-part version of the work.

=== Wider audience ===
In May 1962 A Child of Our Time received its Israel premiere in Tel Aviv. Tippett says that this performance was delayed because for a while there were local objections to the word "Jesus" in the text. When it came about, among the audience was Herschel Grynszpan's father who, Tippett wrote, was "manifestly touched by the work his son's precipitate action 25 years earlier had inspired." The performance, by the Kol Yisrael Orchestra with the Tel Aviv Chamber Choir, was acclaimed by the audience of 3000, but received mixed reviews from the press. The Times report noted contrasting opinions from two leading Israeli newspapers. The correspondent for Haaretz had expressed disappointment: "Every tone is unoriginal, and the work repeats old effects in a most conventional manner". Conversely, according to the Times report, HaBoker's critic had "found that the composition had moved everyone to the depths of his soul ... no Jewish composer had ever written anything so sublime on the theme of the Holocaust."

Despite its successes in Europe A Child of Our Time did not reach the United States until 1965, when it was performed during the Aspen Music Festival, with the composer present. In his memoirs Tippett mentions another performance on that American tour, at a women's college in Baltimore, in which the male chorus and soloists were black Catholic ordinands from a local seminary. The first significant American presentations of the work came a decade later: at Cleveland in 1977 where Prince Charles, who was visiting, delayed his departure so that he could attend, and at Carnegie Hall, New York, where Colin Davis conducted the Boston Symphony Orchestra and the Tanglewood Festival Chorus. Reviewing this performance for The New York Times, Donal Henahan was unconvinced that the work's "sincerity and unimpeachable intentions add[ed] up to important music". The spirituals were sung with passion and fervour, but the rest was "reminiscent of a familiar pious sermon" in which the words were only intermittently intelligible. Meanwhile, the work had achieved its African debut, where in 1975 Tippett observed a performance with an improvised orchestra which incorporated the Zambian Police Band. The Zambian president, Kenneth Kaunda, was present, and entertained the composer afterwards.

=== Later performances ===
In October 1999, in the year following Tippett's death, A Child of Our Time received a belated New York Philharmonic premiere, at the Avery Fisher Hall. The New York Times reviewer, Paul Griffiths, expressed some astonishment that this was the orchestra's first attempt at the work. As part of the celebrations for the centenary of the composer's birth in January 2005, English National Opera staged a dramatised performance of the work, directed by Jonathan Kent—coincidentally, the first performance fell in the week of the 60th anniversary of the liberation of the death camps at Auschwitz. Anna Picard, writing in The Independent, recognised the work's sincerity but found the dramatisation of its pacifist message wholly inappropriate: "Do we really need to see a dozen well-fed actors and singers stripped and led into a smoking pit in order to understand the Holocaust?" Anthony Holden in The Observer was more positive, commenting that "If you must stage a work intended for concert performance ... it is hard to imagine a more effective version than Kent's, shot through with heavy symbolism of which Tippett would surely have approved." Nevertheless, Holden found the overall result "super-solemn, lurching between the over-literalistic and the portentous". The 2005 Holocaust Days of Remembrance (1–8 May) were marked at the Kennedy Center in Washington DC by a special performance of A Child of Our time, in which the Washington Chorus was directed by Robert Shafer.

A Child of Our Time has survived periods of indifference, particularly in America, to be ranked alongside Britten's War Requiem as one of the most frequently performed large-scale choral works of the post-Second World War period. According to Meirion Bowen, Tippett's long-time companion and a champion of his music, the work's particular quality is its universal message, with which audiences all over the world have identified. In his notes accompanying the performance at the 2010 Grant Park Music Festival in Chicago, Richard E. Rodda summarises the work's continuing appeal: "[I]t deals with issues as timeless as civilization itself—man's inhumanity to man, the place of the individual who confronts ruthless power ... the need for learning the lessons of history and for compassion and understanding and honesty and equality in our dealings with each other, whatever our differences may be. Tippett's Child still speaks profoundly to us in our own deeply troubled time".

== Music ==
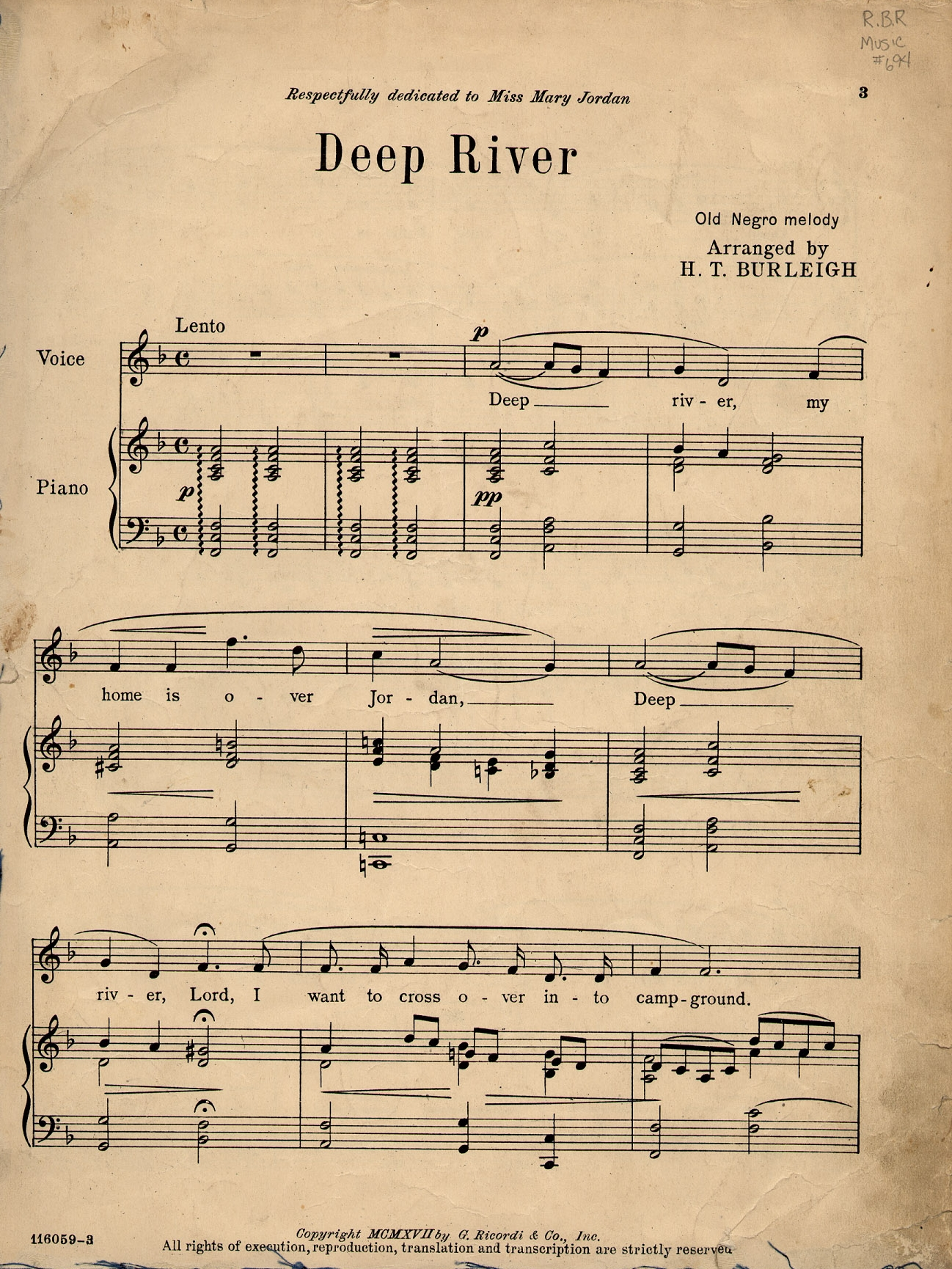
"Deep River, my home is over Jordan" The final spiritual in the oratorio, sheet music version 1917

Kemp describes Tippett's central problem in composing A Child of Our Time as integrating the language of the spirituals with his own musical style. Tippett was, in Kemp's view, entirely successful in this respect; "O by and by", he says, sounds as if it could almost have been composed by Tippett. To assist the process of integration the composer had obtained recordings of American singing groups, especially the Hall Johnson Choir, which provided him with a three-part model for determining the relationships between solo voices and chorus in the spirituals: chorus, soloists, chorus. Tippett's instructions in the score specify that "the spirituals should not be thought of as congregational hymns, but as integral parts of the Oratorio; nor should they be sentimentalised but sung with a strong underlying beat and slightly 'swung'".

The brief orchestral prelude to Part I introduces the two contrasting moods which pervade the entire work. Kemp likens the opening "snarling trumpet triad" to "a descent into Hades", but it is answered immediately by a gently mournful phrase in the strings. In general the eight numbers which comprise this first part each have, says Gloag, their own distinct texture and harmonic identity, often in a disjunctive relationship with each other, although the second and third numbers are connected by an orchestral "interludium". From among the diverse musical features Steinberg draws attention to rhythms in the chorus "When Shall The Usurer's City Cease" that illustrate Tippett's knowledge of and feel for the English madrigal. What Kemp describes as "one of the supreme moments in Tippett's music" occurs towards the end of the Part, as the soprano's aria melts into the spiritual "Steal away": "a [transition] so poignant as to set off that instant shock of recognition that floods the eyes with emotion ... although the soprano continues to grieve in a floating melisma, the spiritual comes as a relief as well as a release".

Because of its large number (17) of generally short components, Part II is the most diffuse of the three parts, texturally and harmonically. The narrative is driven largely by alternating choruses and comments from the Narrator, with two brief operatic scenas in which the four soloists participate. Kemp finds in one of the choruses an allusion to "Sei gegrüsset" from Bach's St John Passion, and hears traces of Elgar in the soprano's solo "O my son!" which begins the first scena. The narrative climax is reached with the "Spiritual of Anger": "Go Down, Moses", which Tippett arranges in the form of a chorale. This is followed by three short meditations from tenor, soprano and alto soloists, before a possible redemption is glimpsed in the spiritual which ends the Part, "O by and by", with a soprano descant which Steinberg describes as "ecstatic". Part III consists of only five numbers, each rather more extensive than most of those in the earlier sections of the oratorio. The Part has, on the whole, a greater unity than its predecessors. The musical and emotional climax to the whole work is the penultimate ensemble: "I Would Know my Shadow and my Light". Kemp writes: "The whole work has been leading to this moment ... the ensemble flows into a rapturous wordless benediction [before] a modulation leads into 'Deep River'". In this final spiritual, for the first time the full vocal and instrumental resources are deployed. The oratorio ends quietly, on an extended pianissimo "Lord".

The total vocal and instrumental resources required for the oratorio are a SATB chorus with soprano, alto, tenor and bass soloists, and an orchestra comprising two flutes, two oboes, English horn, two clarinets, two bassoons, contrabassoon, four horns, three trumpets, three trombones, timpani, cymbals and strings. According to the vocal score, the approximate duration of the work is 66 minutes.

== Recordings ==
The first recording of A Child of Our Time was issued in 1958, and remained the only available version for 17 years. Sir Colin Davis made the first of his three recordings of the work in 1975. Tippett himself, at the age of 86, conducted a recording of the work with the City of Birmingham Symphony Orchestra and Chorus in 1991.

Year	Soloists (SATB)	Conductor Orchestra and chorus	Label	References
1958	Elsie Morison; Pamela Bowden; Richard Lewis; Richard Standen	John Pritchard; Royal Liverpool Philharmonic Chorus and Orchestra	Vinyl: Pye CCL30114/5; Vinyl: Argo ZDA19/20 (stereo 1963)	
1975	Jessye Norman; Janet Baker; Richard Cassilly; John Shirley-Quirk	Colin Davis; BBC Symphony Orchestra and BBC Singers	Vinyl: Philips 6500985	
1986	Sheila Armstrong; Felicity Palmer; Philip Langridge; John Shirley-Quirk	André Previn; Royal Philharmonic Orchestra and Brighton Festival Chorus	CD: RPO 7012	
1991	Faye Robinson; Sarah Walker; Jon Garrison; John Cheek	Michael Tippett; City of Birmingham Symphony Orchestra and CBSO Chorus	CD: Naxos 855750	
1992	Cynthia Haymon; Cynthia Clarey; Damon Evans; Willard White	Richard Hickox; London Symphony Orchestra and Chorus	CD: Chandos CHAN9123	
2003	Ute Selbig; Norah Gubisch; Jerry Hadley; Robert Holl	Colin Davis; Staatskapelle Dresden	CD: Profil PH7052	
2007	Indra Thomas; Mihoko Fujimura; Steve Davislim; Matthew Rose	Colin Davis; London Symphony Orchestra and Chorus	CD: LSO0670 (recorded live performance)	

== Notes and references ==
Notes

Citations

Bibliography

- Gloag, Kenneth (1999). Tippett, A Child of Our Time. Cambridge UK: Cambridge University Press. ISBN 978-0-521-59753-1.
- Hartog, Howard, ed. (1961). European Music in the Twentieth Century. Harmondsworth: Penguin Books. OCLC 602294799.
- Kemp, Ian (1987). Tippett: The Composer and His Music. Oxford UK: Oxford University Press. ISBN 0-19-282017-6.
- Steinberg, Michael (2005). Choral Masterworks: A Listener's Guide. New York: Oxford University Press. ISBN 978-0-19-512644-0. "A Child of Our Time."
- Tippett, Michael (1994). Those Twentieth Century Blues. London: Pimlico. ISBN 0-7126-6059-3.
- Tippett, Michael (1944). A Child of Our Time: Oratorio for soli, chorus and orchestra. London: Schott & Co. OCLC 22331371.
- Whittall, Arnold (1982). The Music of Britten and Tippett. Cambridge UK: Cambridge University Press. ISBN 0-521-23523-5.
