= Swing Low, Sweet Chariot =

African-American spiritual

"Swing Low Sweet Chariot"
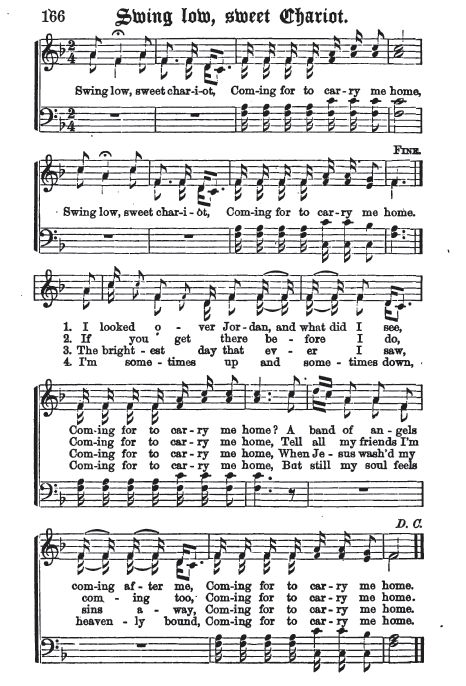
- Page from The Jubilee Singers (1873)

Song
- Written: After 1865
- Genre: Spirituals
- Songwriters: Minerva Willis; Wallace Willis

"Swing Low, Sweet Chariot"
Performed by the Fisk Jubilee Singers

"Swing Low, Sweet Chariot" is an African-American spiritual song and one of the best-known Christian hymns. Originating in early African-American musical traditions, the song was probably composed in the late 1860s by Wallace Willis and his daughter Minerva Willis, both Choctaw Freedmen. Performances by the Hampton Singers and the Fisk Jubilee Singers brought the song to the attention of wider audiences in the late 19th century. The earliest known recording of "Swing Low, Sweet Chariot" was recorded in 1894 by the Standard Quartette.

The song uses the theme of death to remind the audience of the glory that awaits in Heaven, when Christians believe they will transcend the earthly world of suffering and come to rest in their final home. Specifically, the text refers to the Old Testament account of the Prophet Elijah's ascent into Heaven by chariot. The stylistic elements and thematic content are highly typical to those of other spirituals. The song is characterized by its use of repetition as a key poetic element, powerful imagery, personal rhetoric, and potentially coded lyrics. "Swing Low, Sweet Chariot" was traditionally performed as a call-and response tune. Its free-form structure intentionally allows for improvisation and spur-of-the-moment changes made to bring the performers and audience to a state of ecstasy and connection with the Holy Spirit. The melody is pentatonic.

In 2002, the US Library of Congress inducted the Fisk Jubilee Singers' recording of the song into the National Recording Registry during its inaugural year for being culturally, historically, or aesthetically significant. It was also included in the list of Songs of the Century, by the Recording Industry Association of America and the National Endowment for the Arts. In addition, a mid 20th century recording of the song has been preserved within the permanent collection of the Smithsonian Institution's National Museum of American History.

== History ==
"Swing Low, Sweet Chariot" was composed by Wallace Willis and Minerva Willis, Choctaw Freedmen in the old Indian Territory in what is now Choctaw County, near the County seat of Hugo, Oklahoma, sometime after 1865. He may have been inspired by the sight of the Red River, by which he was toiling, which reminded him of the Jordan River and of the Prophet Elijah being taken to heaven by a chariot (2 Kings 2:11). Some sources claim that this song and "Steal Away" (also sung by Willis) had lyrics that referred to the Underground Railroad, the freedom movement that helped black people escape from Southern slavery to the North and Canada.

Alexander Reid, a minister at the Old Spencer Academy, a Choctaw boarding school, heard Willis singing these two songs and transcribed the words and melodies. He sent the music to the Jubilee Singers of Fisk University in Nashville, Tennessee. The Jubilee Singers popularized the songs during a tour of the United States and Europe.

In 1939, Nazi Germany's Reich Music Examination Office added the song to a listing of "undesired and harmful" musical works. Nevertheless, by 1946 the Joe Biviano Accordion and Rhythm Sextette showcased the song for audiences of American jazz in a recording with two young emerging instrumentalists: Tony Mottola on guitar and John Serry on accordion. Their collaboration was subsequently incorporated into the permanent collection at the Smithsonian Institution's National Museum of American History.

The song enjoyed a resurgence during the 1960s Civil Rights struggle and the folk revival; it was performed by a number of artists. Perhaps the most famous performance during this period was that by Joan Baez during the legendary 1969 Woodstock festival.

Oklahoma State Senator Judy Eason McIntyre from Tulsa proposed a bill nominating "Swing Low, Sweet Chariot" as the Oklahoma State official gospel song in 2011. The bill was co-sponsored by the Oklahoma State Black Congressional Caucus. Oklahoma Governor Mary Fallin signed the bill into law on May 5, 2011, at a ceremony at the Oklahoma Cowboy Hall of Fame; making the song the official Oklahoma State Gospel Song.

== Lyrics ==
Refrain:
Swing low, sweet chariot, (Note: In subsequent refrains, it is customary to add "Oh" before the first "Swing Low")
Coming for to carry me home.
Swing low, sweet chariot,
Coming for to carry me home.

I looked over Jordan, and what did I see,
Coming for to carry me home.
I saw a band of angels coming after me,
Coming for to carry me home.

[Refrain]

If you get back to heaven before I do,
Coming for to carry me home.
You'll tell all your friends I'll be coming there too,
Coming for to carry me home.

[Refrain]

As is typical of folk songs, there is no standardized set of lyrics. The version by the Fisk Jubilee Singers takes the following structure:

Refrain:
Swing low, sweet chariot
Coming for to carry me home
Swing low, sweet chariot
Coming for to carry me home

[Refrain]

I'm sometimes up, I'm sometimes down
Coming for to carry me home
But still my soul feels heavenly bound
Coming for to carry me home

[Refrain]

I looked over Jordan and what did I see?
Coming for to carry me home
A band of angels coming after me
Coming for to carry me home

[Refrain]

[Refrain]

== Content and style ==
The content of the song is typical to the style of the spiritual in several ways: its use of imagery that provides a sense of immediacy to the historical and biblical past, the repetition of the key poetic element of the song (“Coming for to carry me home”), and the alteration between the refrain and the stanzas throughout. The song alternates between first person and second person pronouns, stressing the relationship between the performer, the listener, and the events unfolding in the song. By directly calling to the listener in the second stanza (“If you get there before I do”) the audience is transformed into a creative device that serves to heighten the emotional urgency of the tune.

The song was originally intended to be sung in a call-and-response, a format that draws from the heritage of African styles of music and is widely used in African-American churches today. A leader sings the differentiated lines, and the congregation replies “Coming for to carry me home” after each. This style of performing the spiritual can be heard in the existing recordings of the Fisk Jubilee Singers performing the tune. This call-and-response performance style is the most common form of spiritual.

The simple, repetitive nature of the song, along with the fact that it was commonly performed without instrumental accompaniment, meant that spontaneous shifts in tempo, pitch, and emphasis were commonly made, leading the song in new and exciting directions intended to unify congregants with the Holy Spirit.

Like other spirituals, “Swing Low Sweet Chariot” has been thought to contain coded meanings not immediately apparent to all listeners. American historian Charshee Charlotte Lawrence McIntyre argues that many spirituals make use of “metonymic devices,” or metaphors that have encoded meanings. She claims that throughout many traditional spirituals several recurring figures always carry a metonymic double meaning. These double meanings allowed enslaved people to safely communicate messages of hope, freedom, and specific plans for escape to one another under the watchful gaze of their captors. The double meanings encoded in “Swing Low, Sweet Chariot” are believed to be the Jordan River as representative of the first step to freedom from slavery, “home” as Africa, and Jesus as anyone who helps bring the enslaved to freedom. However, a definitive categorization of any such figures is impossible to make.

== Film, video games, and television appearances ==
The song has frequently been used in films and television.

- 1931: Dirigible – sung by Clarence Muse
- 1936: Dimples – hummed by the Hall Johnson Choir
- 1936: The Lonely Trail – sung by a choir
- 1938: Everybody Sing – swing version sung by Judy Garland in blackface at an audition, with special lyrics.
- 1938: Room Service – sung by the Marx Brothers
- 1943: Dixie – sung by Bing Crosby and a chorus
- 1944: The Adventures of Mark Twain - sung by Fredric March playing Samuel Clemens
- 1948: A Date with Judy
- 1950: Young Man with a Horn – sung by a chorus
- 1961: The Alvin Show – sung during one of the show's musical segments
- 1970: Woodstock - sung by Joan Baez at the 1969 Woodstock Festival in Bethel, New York.
- 1971: The Hard Ride – sung by Bill Medley
- 1974: Blazing Saddles – briefly sung by Lyle, albeit in a mocking tone, while working on the railroad
- 1976: The Shaggy D.A. – sung by a dog in the dog pound
- 1980: The Muppet Show— sung by Dizzy Gillespie
- 1982: Honkytonk Man
- 1983: National Lampoon's Vacation – sung by Clark Griswold (played by Chevy Chase)
- 1984: Revenge of the Nerds - played on a record player before being quickly stopped by Lamar.
- 1985: Fletch - sung by Fletch (played by Chevy Chase) as he's being placed in jail.
- 1993: Addams Family Values – sung by Gomez Addams (played by Raúl Juliá) on his deathbed
- 1993: Mister Rogers' Neighborhood Episode 1993 – sung by François Clemmons
- 1997: Con Air – sung by Nathan 'Diamond Dog' Jones (played by Ving Rhames)
- 2001: Futurama in season 3, episode 3 - sung by Bender (played by John DiMaggio)
- 2002: Cabin Fever
- 2003: The Fighting Temptations - Performed by Beyoncé
- 2003: The Saddest Music in the World - sung by Maria de Medeiros
- 2004: Jersey Girl
- 2007: The Legend of Spyro: The Eternal Night - sung by Sparx (played by Billy West)
- 2008: iCarly - sung by Spencer Shay (played by Jerry Trainor)
- 2009: Scrubs in season 8, episode 7 - sung by Elliot Reid (played by Sarah Chalke)
- 2012: Brickleberry in season 1, episode 5 - sung by Steve Williams (in black) (voiced by David Herman)
- 2014: Freedom – Performed by The St. Olaf Choir and Marvis Martin
- 2016: The Birth of a Nation
- 2016: The Amazing World of Gumball Episode: "The Origins"
- 2019: The X Factor: Celebrity – performed by group Try Star (composed of former rugby union players Levi Davis, Thom Evans and Ben Foden) on the second live show
- 2024: Bonhoeffer

== Renditions ==
A popular early recording was by the Fisk University Jubilee Quartet for Victor Records (No. 16453) on December 1, 1909, which became the first gospel song to sell 1 million copies and is one of the best-selling gospel songs of all time. Two years later the Apollo Jubilee Quartette recorded the song on Monday, February 26, 1912, Columbia Records (A1169), New York City.

Since then, numerous versions have been recorded; including those by Nellie Melba (one of her last recordings, made in June 1926), Bing Crosby (recorded April 25, 1938), Kenny Ball and His Jazzmen (included in the album The Kenny Ball Show – 1962), Louis Armstrong (for his album Louis and the Good Book – 1958), Sam Cooke (for his album Swing Low – 1961), Vince Hill (1993), Peggy Lee (1946), and Paul Robeson (recorded January 7, 1926 for Victor (No. 20068)). In 1951, Dizzy Gillespie replaced the chariot with a Cadillac; first a Fleetwood and later, as on the 1967 album Swing Low, Sweet Cadillac, an Eldorado.

=== Biviano Accordion Sextette ===
External audio
- You may listen to the Joe Biviano Accordion Rhythm Sextette with John Serry Sr. and Tony Mottola performing Swing Low, Sweet Chariot in 1945 Here

The jazz accordionist/composer John Serry recorded the composition with the jazz guitarist Tony Mottola as members of the Biviano Accordion & Rhythm Sextette in 1946 for Sonora Records on the album Accordion Capers (Sonora # MS 476) which has been archived as part of the permanent collection at the Smithsonian Institution's National Museum of American History.

=== Eric Clapton ===
"Swing Low, Sweet Chariot"

Single by Eric Clapton

from the album There's One in Every Crowd
- B-side: "Pretty Blue Eyes"
- Released: May 1975
- Genre: Blues rock · reggae
- Length: 3:33
- Label: RSO
- Songwriter: Wallace Willis
- Producer: Tom Dowd

Eric Clapton singles chronology
| "Willie and the Hand Jive" (1974) | "Swing Low, Sweet Chariot" (1975) | "Knockin' on Heaven's Door" (1975) |

British rock musician Eric Clapton recorded a reggae version of the song for his 1975 studio album There's One in Every Crowd. RSO Records released it with the B-side "Pretty Blue Eyes" as a seven-inch gramophone single in May the same year, produced by Tom Dowd. His version reached various singles charts, including Japan, the Netherlands, New Zealand and the United Kingdom.

==== Weekly chart performance ====
| Chart (1975) | Peak position |
|---|---|
| Japan (Oricon) | 89 |
| Netherlands (Dutch Top 40) | 21 |
| Netherlands (Single Top 100) | 26 |
| New Zealand (Recorded Music NZ) | 15 |
| UK Singles (Official Charts) | 19 |

=== References in other songs ===
"Swing Low, Sweet Chariot" contains the lyrics, "I looked over Jordan and what did I see? Coming for to carry me home". Pink Floyd's 1977 song "Sheep", written by Roger Waters, makes reference to the song with the lyrics, "I've looked over Jordan and I have seen, things are not what they seem". A later 1992 song by Waters, "The Bravery of Being Out of Range", makes further reference to the song with the lyrics, "I looked over Jordan and what did I see? I saw a U.S. Marine in a pile of debris".

== Use in rugby union ==
"Swing Low, Sweet Chariot" has been sung by English rugby players and fans for some decades, and there are associated gestures, sometimes used in a drinking game, which requires those who wrongly perform the gestures to buy a round of drinks. Folk singer Joe Stead claimed he introduced it to the rugby fraternity as early as 1960 after hearing it from civil rights activist Paul Robeson. An article published in Tatler in 1966 described a "tradition" at the West Park bar at Twickenham of patrons singing the song whilst swaying as one, shoulder-to-shoulder. It became associated with the England national side, in particular, in 1988.

=== First documented singing at Twickenham (1987) ===
The World Rugby Museum in 2020 unearthed archive footage of "Swing Low" being sung at Twickenham when Martin Offiah (nicknamed "Chariots" as a play-on-words referencing the 1981 film Chariots of Fire), played in the 1987 Middlesex Sevens tournament. The curator of the museum believes the crowd at Twickenham would already have known "Swing Low" because it had been sung in rugby clubs since the 1960s, with rude gestures illustrating the words.

=== First documented singing at an England international match (1988) ===
Coming into the last match of the 1988 season, against Ireland at Twickenham, England had lost 15 of their previous 23 matches in the Five Nations Championship. The Twickenham crowd had only seen one solitary England try in the previous two years and at half time against Ireland they were 0–3 down. However, during the second half England scored six tries to give them a 35–3 win. The official account of this occasion from the Rugby Football Union is that a group of fans from Market Bosworth rugby club in the West Stand started singing the song before it was taken up by the rest of the crowd. Another account states that a group of boys from Douai School were the ones in the crowd to begin singing the song before it was taken up by other fans. The song is still regularly sung at matches by English supporters.

=== 2020 review ===
In 2020 the Rugby Football Union, in response to the increased interest in the Black Lives Matter movement after the murder of George Floyd, said it was "reviewing" fans' use of the song. Former rugby player Brian Moore and Prince Harry both argued that the song should no longer be sung in rugby contexts. Former Barbarian and Rugby League Hall of Fame player Martin Offiah shortly afterwards said that he thought the song should be retained as an opportunity to educate England's and other nationalities' rugby fans about racial discrimination and Black history. Former England player Maggie Alphonsi said "I think it's good the RFU are having a review, but I don't agree with it being banned".

== Rugby-related record releases ==
=== 1991 ===
The song became the England Rugby World Cup theme for the 1991 Rugby World Cup, when performed by "Union featuring the England World Cup Squad". It reached number 16 on the UK singles chart.

=== 1995 ===
The song was covered in 1995 for that year's tournament by British reggae duo China Black together with South African male choral group, Ladysmith Black Mambazo. Released as a single on 22 May 1995, it reached number 15 on the UK Singles Chart.

=== 1999 ===
1999's tournament featured Russell Watson record a version (titled Swing Low '99) which had less success, only peaking at number 38 on the UK chart.

=== 2003 ===
"Swing Low"

Single by UB40 featuring United Colours of Sound

from the album Homegrown
- B-side: "Swing Low" (Stadium mix)
- Released: October 27, 2003
- Length: 3:27
- Label: DEP International
- Songwriters: Charlie Skarbek; Traditional
- Producer: Charlie Skarbek

UB40 singles chronology
| "Cover Up" (2002) | "Swing Low" (2003) | "Kiss and Say Goodbye" (2005) |

The song enjoyed more success in 2003's tournament, but included the album Homegrown, when recorded by UB40 and the United Colours of Sound. It originally peaked at number 23, but following England's victory in the tournament, the cover reached number 15. In the wake of the tournament, UB40 performed the song at a concert at the NEC Arena Birmingham that was attended by England rugby fans and captain Martin Johnson. The England national rugby union team returned from the 2003 Rugby World Cup triumph in Australia on a plane dubbed "Sweet Chariot".

=== 2007 ===
Another version was recorded by Blake for the 2007 Rugby World Cup.

=== 2011 ===
For the 2011 Rugby World Cup in New Zealand, all-girl group Our Lady Muse (O.L.M) released an England Rugby World Cup Song. An upbeat party anthem version of Swing Low, Sweet Chariot – The Song was premiered at the "Polo Rocks" concert in aid of The Prince's Trust.

=== 2015 ===
"Swing Low, Sweet Chariot"

Single by Ella Eyre
- Released: September 7, 2015
- Recorded: 2014
- Genre: Pop
- Length: 3:14
- Label: Virgin EMI Records
- Songwriter: Wallace Willis
- Producers: Glyn Aikins; Mojam

Ella Eyre singles chronology
| "Good Times" (2015) | "Swing Low, Sweet Chariot" (2015) | "Best of My Love" (2015) |

English singer Ella Eyre released a cover version of the song on September 7, 2015, as a digital download in association with England Rugby, to coincide with the 2015 Rugby World Cup, with the song raising money for England Rugby's All Schools programme. The song was produced by Glyn Aikins and Mojam, it peaked to number 134 on the UK Singles Chart and number 87 on the Scottish Singles Chart. A music video to accompany the release of "Swing Low, Sweet Chariot" was first released onto YouTube on September 10, 2015, at a total length of three minutes and ten seconds.

==== Track listing ====
Digital download
| No. | Title | Length |
|---|---|---|
| 1. | "Swing Low, Sweet Chariot" | 3:14 |

==== Chart performance ====
| Chart (2015) | Peak position |
|---|---|
| Scottish Singles Sales (Official Charts) | 87 |
| UK Singles (Official Charts Company) | 134 |

==== Release history ====
| Region | Date | Format | Label |
|---|---|---|---|
| United Kingdom | September 7, 2015 | Digital download | Virgin EMI Records |

=== 2018 ===
Country and gospel artist, Josh Turner, released a cover of the song on the 2018 album, I Serve a Savior. The album was Turner's first release that contained mainly gospel music.

== See also ==
- Swing Down Sweet Chariot, a song with a similar title and theme popularized by the Golden Gate Quartet and Elvis

=== African-American spirituals ===
- Songs of the Underground Railroad

=== Rugby union fan songs ===
- "Hen Wlad Fy Nhadau" (Land of My Fathers)
- "Cwm Rhondda" (Bread of Heaven)
- "Hymns and Arias"
- "Sosban Fach"
- "Delilah"
- "Flower of Scotland"
- "Loch Lomond"
- "Ireland's Call"
- "The Fields of Athenry"
- "Shosholoza"
