= Wallace Willis =

American songwriter

Wallace Willis was a Choctaw Freedman living in the Indian Territory, in what is now Choctaw County, near the city of Hugo, Oklahoma, US. His dates are unclear: perhaps 1820 to 1880. He is credited with composing (probably before 1860) several African-American spirituals. Willis received his name from his owner, Britt Willis, probably in Mississippi, the ancestral home of the Choctaws. He died, probably in what is now Atoka County, Oklahoma, as his unmarked grave is located there.

Before the Civil War, Willis and his daughter, Aunt Minerva, were sent by their owner to work at the Spencer Academy where the superintendent, Reverend Alexander Reid, heard them singing. In 1871 Reid was at a performance of the Jubilee Singers of Fisk University and thought the songs he had heard the Willises singing were better than those of the Jubilee Singers. He furnished them to the group, which performed them in the United States and Europe. Many are now famous, including "Swing Low, Sweet Chariot" and "Steal Away To Jesus".

It is sometimes said that the songs credited to Willis had actually been written by unknown composers, but there is no record of any of the songs until they were performed by the Jubilee Singers.

== Compositions ==
- "I'm A Rollin'"
- "Swing Low, Sweet Chariot"
- "Steal Away To Jesus"
- "The Angels are Coming"

== Swing Low, Sweet Chariot ==
"Swing Low Sweet Chariot"
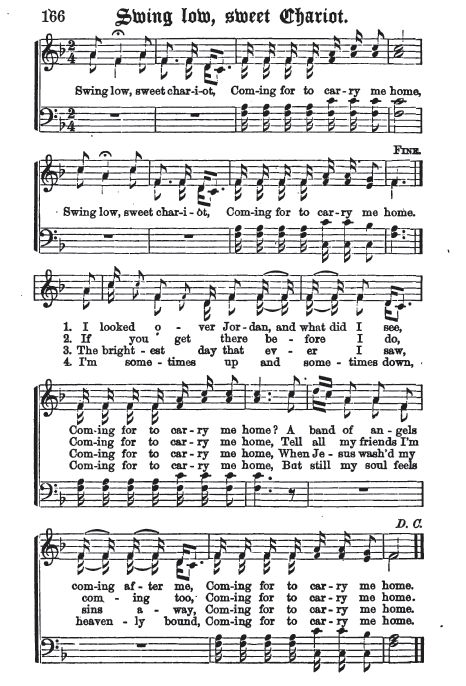
- Page from The Jubilee Singers (1873)

Song
- Written: circa 1840
- Genre: Spirituals
- Songwriter: Wallace Willis

"Swing Low, Sweet Chariot" was composed by Willis in what is now Choctaw County, near the County seat of Hugo, Oklahoma around 1840. He may have been inspired by the sight of the Red River, by which he was toiling, which reminded him of the Jordan River and of the Prophet Elijah being taken to heaven by a chariot (2 Kings 2:11). In 2002, the US Library of Congress honored the song as one of 50 recordings chosen that year to be added to the National Recording Registry. It was also included in the list of Songs of the Century, by the Recording Industry Association of America and the National Endowment for the Arts.

== Bibliography ==
- Banks, Frances. "Narrative" from The WPA Oklahoma Slave Narratives edited by T. Lindsay Baker and Julie P. Baker (United States Work Projects Administration). University of Oklahoma Press, 1996. ISBN 0-8061-2792-9
- Debo, Angie; John M. Oskison (eds. Federal writers Project). Oklahoma: A Guide to the Sooner State. University of Oklahoma Press, 1941.
- Flickinger, Robert Elliot (1914). The Choctaw Freedmen and the Story of Oak Hill Industrial Academy, Valliant, McCurtain County, Oklahoma. Iowa and Florida: Journal and Times Press. ISBN 9781515222804.
- Hubbell, Jay B.; John O. Beaty. An Introduction to Poetry. The Macmillan Company, 1922.
- Wright, Muriel H. Early Navigation and Commerce Along the Arkansas and Red Rivers in Oklahoma". Chronicles of Oklahoma 8:1 (March 1930) 65–88.
- Oklahoma Historical Society. "Oklahoma Historic Sites Survey". Chronicles of Oklahoma 36:1 (1958) 282–314.
