= Minerva Willis =

Choctaw freedman and musician (c. 1820-?)

- Born: c. 1820
- Other name: Aunt Minerva
- Father: Wallace Willis

Minerva Willis (c. 1820 – ?) was a Choctaw Freedman and musician, also known as Aunt Minerva, who contributed to spirituals alongside her father, Wallace Willis. Their compositions, including "Swing Low, Sweet Chariot" and "Steal Away to Jesus," gained international recognition through performances by the Fisk Jubilee Singers.

== Early life ==
Minerva Willis, often referred to as Aunt Minerva, was likely born c. 1820. She was enslaved in the Choctaw Nation area, now part of Oklahoma, and lived on a plantation owned by Britt Willis, an Irishman became a citizen of Choctaw Nation via his marriage to a Choctaw woman. Willis, along with her father Wallace Willis, was transported from Mississippi to Indian Territory during the Trail of Tears. She had no formal education, but her exposure to music through her father became the foundation for her future contributions to spiritual music.

== Music ==
During her adult life, Willis worked alongside her father, Wallace. The Willis family was periodically hired out by their owner, Britt Willis, to Spencer Academy in Spencerville, Oklahoma, a school for Choctaw boys established around 1845. While working at the school, Willis and her father became favorites among the students due to the spirituals they performed during their evening work sessions.

Their musical contributions came to the attention of reverend Alexander Reid, the school's superintendent starting in 1849. Reid documented several of their songs and introduced them to the broader public. Among the most notable spirituals were "Swing Low, Sweet Chariot," "Steal Away to Jesus," and "Roll, Jordan, Roll." In 1871, reverend Reid shared these songs with the Fisk Jubilee Singers. The Jubilee Singers incorporated the Willis' compositions into their performances, which were heard throughout the United States and Europe.

== Personal life ==
Genealogical research from 2019 to 2021 revealed that Willis was the daughter of Wallace Willis, not his wife, as previously believed. Her mother was Charlotte, and all three were enslaved together by Britt Willis. This correction was supported by Wallace Willis's 1884 obituary, written by reverend Reid, and other legal documents.
