= Dinwiddie Colored Quartet =

The Dinwiddie Colored Quartet, also known as the Dinwiddie Quartet or Dinwiddie Quartette, were a black vocal quartet in the United States.

The group was founded in 1898 as a jubilee quartet, under the name the Dinwiddie Quartet, to benefit the Dinwiddie Normal and Industrial School of Dinwiddie County, Virginia. Around 1902, they became independent of the school, and were touring as part of a vaudeville revue.

"Steal Away"
A 1902 recording of the group performing "Steal Away"

In October 1902, they recorded six sides for the Victor Talking Machine Company, under the name of The Dinwiddie Colored Quartet. Recorded in separate sessions on 29 and 31 October, the songs selected were "Down On The Old Camp Ground", "Poor Mourner", "Gabriel's Trumpet", "My Way Is Cloudy", "We'll Anchor Bye-And-Bye", and "Steal Away".

The group is believed to have disbanded in 1904.

== Legacy ==
The Dinwiddie Quartet is believed to be the first black vocal quartet to record on disc. Some scholars incorrectly believed the Dinwiddie Quartet recordings to be the earliest surviving black vocal group recordings of any kind, but prior recordings had been made on wax cylinder by the Unique Quartette, a decade earlier.

All six tracks recorded for Victor survive to the present day. Scholars regard these recordings, especially "Down On The Old Camp Ground", as key documents in the recorded history of black jubilee music.
