= Song of the Free =

"Song of the Free" is a song of the Underground Railroad written circa 1860 about a man fleeing slavery in Tennessee by escaping to Canada via the Underground Railroad. It has eight verses and is composed to the tune of "Oh! Susanna".

== Lyrics ==
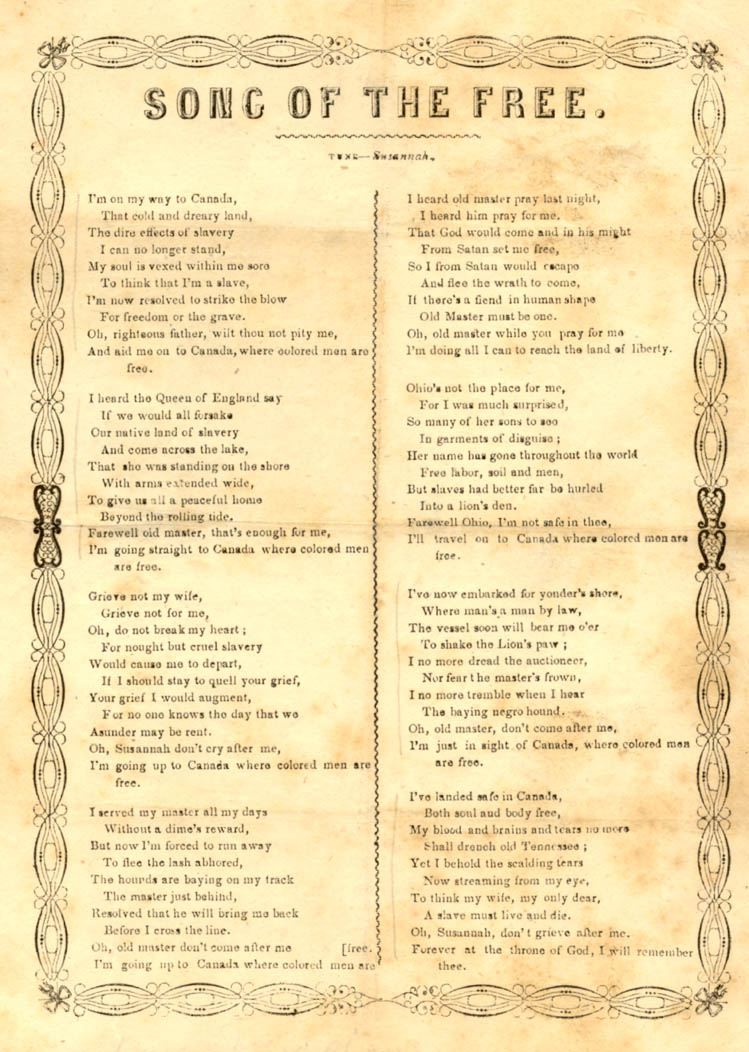
A monograph of lyrics for Song of the Free. From Library and Archives Canada.

The song alludes to, and explicitly states, the lack of freedom experienced by African Americans, and of their servitude to masters who controlled them. It highlights the dangers they were willing to face in order to escape enslavement, including death. Every stanza ends with a reference to Canada as the land "where colored men are free". Although there had been slavery in Canada, an 1803 ruling by Chief Justice William Osgoode had set free many slaves, and the practice was completely abolished in 1834 following the passing of the Slavery Abolition Act 1833 in the British Parliament, which at the time still governed Upper and Lower Canada. This led to the development of the Underground Railroad.

The song's first stanza:

I'm on my way to Canada,
That cold and dreary land,
The dire effects of slavery
I can no longer stand,
My soul is vexed within me more
To think that I'm a slave,
I'm now resolved to strike the blow
For freedom, or the grave.
Oh, righteous father, wilt thou not pity me,
And aid me on to Canada, where colored men are free.

== See also ==
- Songs of the Underground Railroad
