= There's One in Every Crowd =

Studio album by Eric Clapton
- Released: March 1975
- Recorded: Late 1974 – early 1975
- Studios: Criteria (Miami); Dynamic Sounds Studios (Kingston, Jamaica)
- Genres: Blues rock; reggae
- Length: 40:08
- Label: RSO
- Producer: Tom Dowd

Eric Clapton chronology
461 Ocean Boulevard (1974)	There's One in Every Crowd (1975)	E. C. Was Here (1975)

Singles from There's One in Every Crowd
- 1. "Swing Low, Sweet Chariot" Released: May 1975

There's One in Every Crowd is the third solo studio album by Eric Clapton. Recorded shortly after 461 Ocean Boulevard, the album features a style similar to its predecessor but did not enjoy similar commercial success.

== Background and release ==
After the success of "I Shot the Sheriff", Clapton and his backing band went to Jamaica to record There's One in Every Crowd. The songs "Swing Low, Sweet Chariot", "Little Rachel" and "Don't Blame Me" are recorded in a reggae style, though the rest of the record is considered blues and rock. However, with his growing alcohol dependency and drug problems in Jamaica, the record was very challenging to record. Clapton wanted the album title to be "World’s Greatest Guitar Player (There's One in Every Crowd)". RSO didn't like the first part and chose to release the album under the shortened title.

== Chart performance ==
The album reached the Top 40 on three national music charts. Achieving the highest position, number 15, in the United Kingdom, the album was certified with a silver disc by the British Phonographic industry. In the United States, the album peaked at position 21. In New Zealand the album placed itself on number 24 on the official New Zealand music chart, compiled by the Recording Industry Association of New Zealand at the time.

== Critical reception ==
Professional ratings
Review scores
Source	Rating
AllMusic	2/5 stars
Christgau's Record Guide	C+
Frankfurter Allgemeine Zeitung	3.5/5 stars

AllMusic critic William Ruhlmann awarded the album two out of five possible stars, stating that Clapton "hadn't had time to write or gather sufficient material [after the release of 461 Ocean Boulevard] to make a similarly effective album, since the result is a scattershot mixture of styles". Ruhlmann goes on in his review, noting the "album's best track, naturally, was the blues cover, Clapton's take on Elmore James' 'The Sky Is Crying'". and calling the release "a disappointing follow-up to 461 Ocean Boulevard". Robert Christgau rated the album with a "C+". Augustin Schmidt from the German daily newspaper Frankfurter Allgemeine Zeitung said that the album, compared to 461 Ocean Boulevard, which charted high in Germany the year before, is disappointing, but not so bad, when you ignore the commercial success of the 1974 release.

== Track listing ==
Side one
No.	Title	Writer(s)	Length
1.	"We've Been Told (Jesus Coming Soon)" (arranged by Eric Clapton)	traditional · Blind Willie Johnson	4:28
2.	"Swing Low, Sweet Chariot" (arranged by Clapton)	traditional	3:33
3.	"Little Rachel"	Jim Byfield	4:07
4.	"Don't Blame Me"	Clapton; George Terry	3:35
5.	"The Sky Is Crying"	Elmore James	3:58

Side two
No.	Title	Writer(s)	Length
1.	"Singin' the Blues"	Mary McCreary	3:26
2.	"Better Make It Through Today"	Clapton	4:07
3.	"Pretty Blue Eyes"	Clapton	4:45
4.	"High"	Clapton	3:30
5.	"Opposites"	Clapton	4:52
Total length:			40:08

== Personnel ==
- Eric Clapton – lead vocals, electric guitar, acoustic guitar, dobro, arrangements (1, 2)
- Dick Sims – Hammond organ, acoustic piano, Fender Rhodes
- Albhy Galuten – synthesizers
- George Terry – electric guitar, acoustic guitar, group vocals
- Carl Radle – electric guitar, bass guitar
- Jamie Oldaker – drums, percussion
- Yvonne Elliman – lead vocals, group vocals
- Marcy Levy – group vocals

== Production ==
- Producer – Tom Dowd
- Engineers – Graeme Goodall, Carlton Lee and Ronnie Logan (Kingston); Don Gehman, Steve Klein and Karl Richardson (Miami).
- Front Photography – Henry DeChatillon
- Back Photography – Robert Ellis
- Inner Sleeve Drawing – Eric Clapton

== Charts ==
Chart (1975)	Peak position
Australian Albums (Kent Music Report)	15
Canada Top Albums/CDs (RPM)	11
Finnish Albums (Suomen virallinen lista)	10
Japanese Albums (Oricon)	31
New Zealand Albums (RMNZ)	24
UK Albums (Official Charts)	15
US Billboard 200	21

== Certifications ==
Region	Certification	Certified units/sales
United Kingdom (BPI)	Silver	60,000^{^}
^{^} Shipments figures based on certification alone.
