= Songs of the Underground Railroad =

19th-century American spiritual and work songs

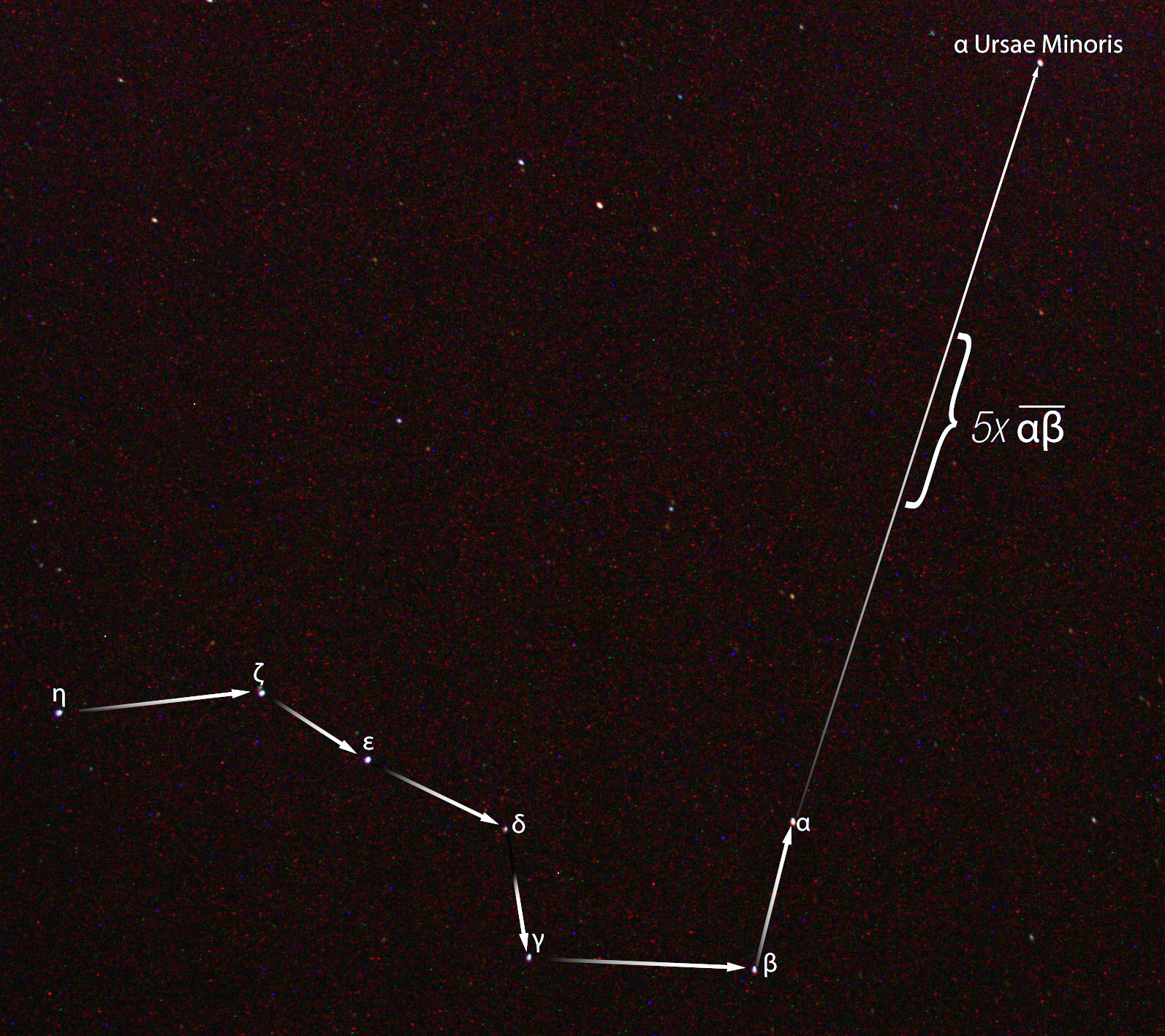
The North Star is on a line from the Big Dipper's stars Merak (β) to Dubhe (α), continued for five times its distance. "Follow the drinking gourd" may mean to use the Big Dipper to find the way north

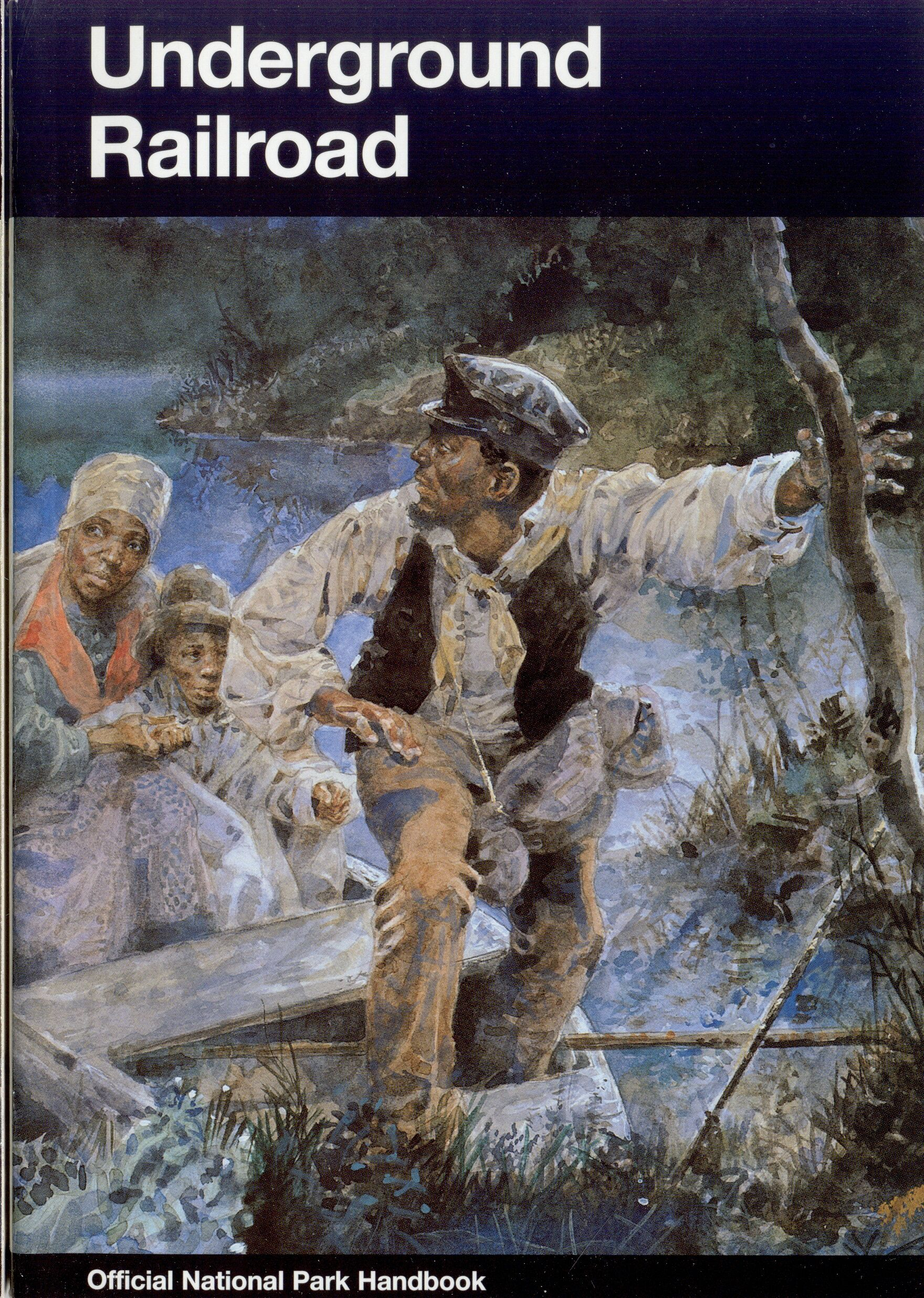
Handbook showing slave on the underground Railroad fleeing from slavery

Songs of the Underground Railroad were spiritual and work songs used during the early-to-mid 19th century in the United States to encourage and convey coded information to escaping slaves as they moved along the various Underground Railroad routes. As it was illegal in most slave states to teach slaves to read or write, songs were used to communicate messages and directions about when, where, and how to escape, and warned of dangers and obstacles along the route.

Harriet Tubman; a significant American Abolitionist who saved many enslaved Africans from slavery through the Underground Railroad used songs such as “Go Down Moses," to indicate safety and “Wade in the Water” to signal escapees to get in the water to hide their scent. Some other songs were also used to signal various groups when she will return and when they should come out of hiding. Some of these songs also acted as a sign of hope and guidance toward freedom for those who she helped rescue. These songs helped as a sign of hope because it allowed enslaved Africans to take their minds off the fear of getting caught and to stay focused on running away towards freedom.

Songs of the Underground Railroad have continued to remain a powerful symbol of resilience, community, and covert resistance. These songs served as coded tools of communication that allowed enslaved people to share plans, warn others of danger, and maintain hope while avoiding detection by slaveholders. Movies like "12 Years a Slave" showed many African American spirituals like "Roll Jordan Roll" and other work songs in the movie which demonstrated how enslaved people used songs to communicate emotions like pain, hope and solidarity. Their dual function as expressions of faith and practical survival strategies highlight the creative ways music became a form of rebellion within enslaved communities. These songs blended biblical imagery with geographic or tactical instructions, allowing messages to be passed safely through spiritual language familiar to both enslaved people and overseers. The cultural legacy of these songs have influenced gospel, blues, and other genres within African American music and continue to appear in classrooms, museums and historical programs.

== Songs ==
One reportedly coded Underground Railroad song is "Follow the Drinkin' Gourd". The song's title is said to refer to the star formation (an asterism) known in America as the Big Dipper and in Europe as The Plough. The pointer stars of the Big Dipper align with the North Star. In this song the repeated line "Follow the Drinkin' Gourd" is thus often interpreted as instructions to escaping slaves to travel north by following the North Star, leading them to the northern states, Canada, and freedom: The song ostensibly encodes escape instructions and a map from Mobile, Alabama, up the Tombigbee River, over the divide to the Tennessee River, then downriver to where the Tennessee and Ohio rivers meet in Paducah, Kentucky.

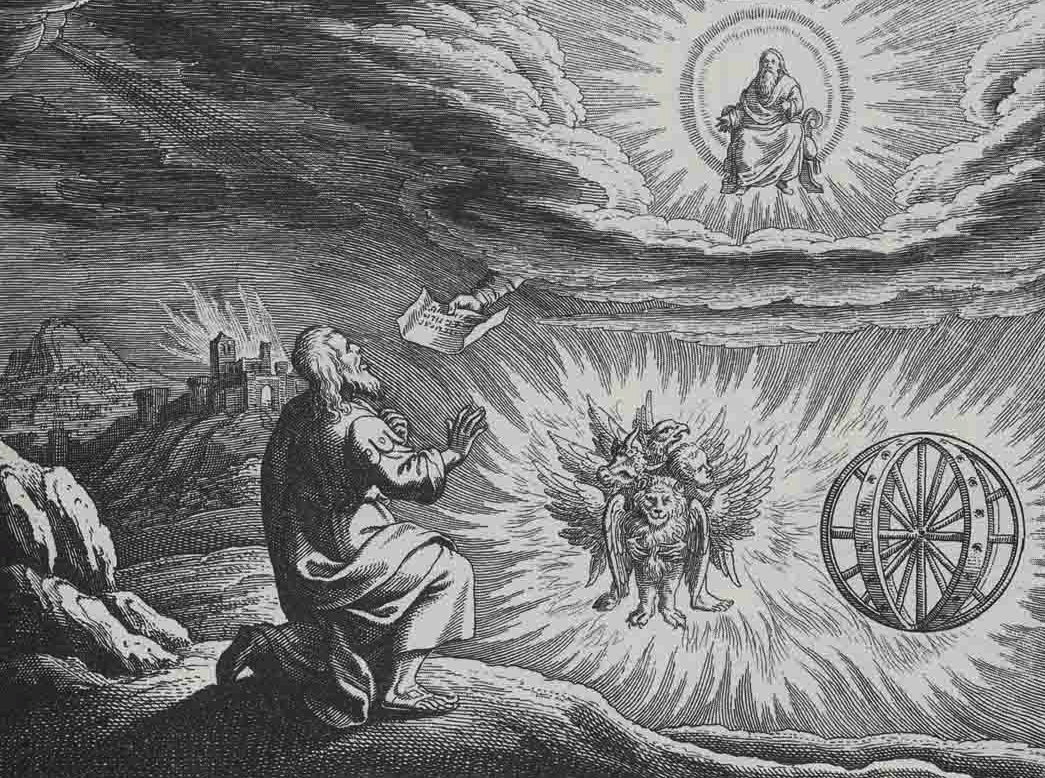
Matthaeus Merian, Ezekiel's "chariot vision" (1593–1650)

Another song with a reportedly secret meaning is "Now Let Me Fly" which references the biblical story of Ezekiel's Wheels. The song talks mostly of a promised land. This song might have boosted the morale and spirit of the slaves, giving them hope that there was a place waiting that was better than where they were.

"Go Down Moses", a spiritual that depicts the biblical story of Moses in Exodus leading his people to freedom, is believed by some to be a coded reference to the conductors on the Underground Railroad. The oppressor in the song is the pharaoh, but in real life would have been the slave owner.

Music is important in the religion of African Americans today, as it was in the telling of freedom.

Frederick Douglass was an escaped slave and abolitionist author. In his 19th-century autobiography, Narrative of the Life of Frederick Douglass, an American Slave (1845), Douglass gives examples of how the songs sung by slaves had multiple meanings. His examples are sometimes quoted to support the claim of coded slave songs. Douglass similarly offers interesting comments but not clear evidence in My Bondage and Freedom: "A keen observer might have detected in our repeated singing of 'O Canaan, sweet Canaan, I am bound for the land of Canaan' something more than a hope of reaching heaven. We meant to reach the north – and the north was our Canaan. I thought I heard them say,/ There were lions in the way,/ I don't expect to stay/ Much longer here/ was a favorite air and had a double meaning. In the lips of some, it meant the expectation of a speedy summons to a world of spirits; but in the lips of our company, it simply meant a speedy pilgrimage toward a free state, and deliverance from all the evils and dangers of slavery."

Douglass's observations here likewise do not serve as clear evidence of the successful use of coded song lyrics to aid escaping slaves; he is writing here only of his small group of slaves who are encouraging each other as they finalize their plans to escape, not of widespread use of codes in song lyrics. At the beginning of this same paragraph, he writes that the slave owner may very well have seen through the simple code they were using: "I am the more inclined to think that he suspected us, because... we did many silly things, very well calculated to awaken suspicion." Douglass immediately goes on to discuss how their repeated singing of freedom was one of those "many silly things".

== Urban legend or truth ==
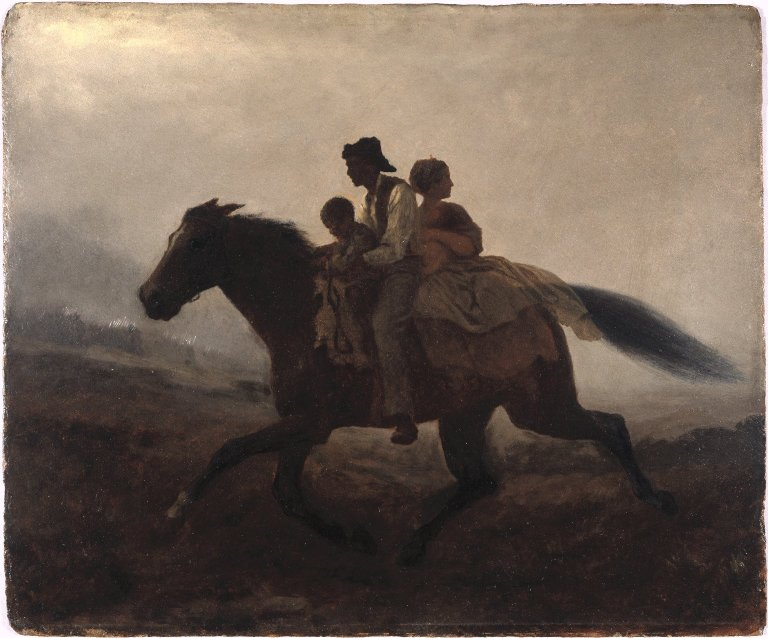
Eastman Johnson, A Ride for Liberty – The Fugitive Slaves, oil on paperboard, 22 x 26.25 inches, circa 1862, Brooklyn Museum

While many believe that the stories told about the songs of the Underground Railroad are true, there are also many skeptics. Some claim that songs of the Underground Railroad is an urban legend dating from the later 20th century and the beginning of the 21st.

Skeptics claim that the legend has been picked up by credulous authors and published as fact without historical documentation. Some authors who believe the song held instructions for escaping slavery admit the ephemeral nature of oral history, often using such phrases as "supposed", "according to folklorists", and "gospelologists cite", to preface their statements.

Many popular sources claim that spirituals and other songs, such as "Steal Away" or "Follow the Drinkin' Gourd", contained coded information and helped individuals navigate the railroad, but these sources offer little traditional archival evidence to support their claims. Some scholars who have examined these claims tend to believe that while the slave songs may certainly have expressed hope for deliverance from the sorrows of this world, these songs did not present literal help for runaway slaves.

There is evidence, however, that the Underground Railroad conductor Harriet Tubman used at least two songs. Sarah Bradford's biography of Tubman, Scenes in the Life of Harriet Tubman, published in 1869, quotes Tubman as saying that she used "Go Down Moses" as one of two code songs to communicate with fugitive enslaved people escaping from Maryland.

== "Follow the Drinkin' Gourd" ==
The theory perhaps developed from the expansion of a folktale found in John A. Lomax's 1934 book American Ballads & Folk Songs. In his preface to "Foller de Drinkin' Gou'd", page 227 in his section on reels, he quotes a story from H.B Parks: "One of my great-uncles, who was connected with the railroad movement, remembered that in the records of the Anti-Slavery Society there was a story of a peg-leg sailor, known as Peg-Leg Joe, who made a number of trips through the South and induced young Negroes to run away and escape... The main scene of his activities was in the country north of Mobile, and the trail described in the song followed northward to the headwaters of the Tombigbee River, thence over the divide and down the Ohio River to Ohio... the peg-leg sailor would... teach this song to the young slaves and show them the mark of his natural left foot and the round hole made by his peg-leg. He would then go ahead of them northward and leave a print made of charcoal and mud of the outline of a human left foot and a round spot in place of the right foot... Nothing more could be found relative to the man... 'Drinkin' gou'd' is the Great Dipper... 'The grea' big un' the Ohio.

== Songs associated with the Underground Railroad ==
- "Follow the Drinkin' Gourd"
- "Go Down Moses"
- "Let Us Break Bread Together"
- "Swing Low, Sweet Chariot"
- "Steal Away (To Jesus)"
- "Wade in the Water"
- "Song of the Free"
- John Coltrane has a song titled "Song of the Underground Railroad" on his album Africa/Brass.
- "Down in the River to Pray"
- "Michael Row the Boat Ashore"

== See also ==
- "Jimmy Crack Corn"
- Slave Songs of the United States
- "The Gospel Train"
