= Follow the Drinkin' Gourd =

African American folk song

Follow the Drinking Gourd is an African-American folk song first published in 1928. The "drinking gourd" is another name for the Big Dipper asterism. Enslaved people in the United States used it as a point of reference so they would not get lost during their journey of escape to the North and to freedom.

The song was used by a conductor of the Underground Railroad, called Peg Leg Joe, to guide people escaping enslavement, and many of the lyrics are simply cartographic directions to advise the runaways on their escape route. While the song may possibly refer to some lost fragment of history, the origin and context remain a mystery.

A more recent source challenges the claim that the song helped free anyone from slavery, as no pre-1910 reference to it has ever been found.

== History ==
=== Texas Folklore Society and H. B. Parks ===
Follow the Drinking Gourd was collected by H. B. Parks, an entomologist and amateur folklorist, in the 1910s. Parks reported that Peg Leg Joe, an operative of the Underground Railroad, had passed as a laborer and spread the song to different plantations, giving directions for slaves to escape. The song was published by the Texas Folklore Society in 1928. (The cover spells the title "Foller de Drinkin' Gou'd.")

=== Lee Hays ===
In 1947, Lee Hays, of the Almanac Singers and The Weavers, rearranged Follow the Drinkin' Gourd and published it in the People's Songs Bulletin. Familiar with African-American music and culture, Hays stated that he himself had heard parts of the song from an elderly black woman named Aunty Laura. Hays described the melody as coming from Aunty Laura, while the lyrics came from anthologies – probably the Parks version.

=== Randy Sparks/John Woodum ===
In 1955, singer Randy Sparks heard the song from an elderly street singer named John Woodum. These lyrics diverged greatly from the Parks and Hays versions and included no geographical information. Sparks later founded The New Christy Minstrels, with whom he recorded a version of the song based on Woodum's lyrics.

== Song lyrics ==
Follow the drinkin' gourd
Follow the drinkin' gourd
For the old man is comin' just to carry you to freedom
Follow the drinkin' gourd

When the sun comes back, and the first quail calls
Follow the drinkin' gourd
For the old man is waiting just to carry you to freedom
Follow the drinkin' gourd

Follow the drinkin' gourd
Follow the drinkin' gourd
For the old man is waiting to carry you to freedom
Follow the drinkin' gourd

Well the river bank makes a mighty good road
Dead trees will show you the way
Left foot, peg foot, travelin' on
Follow the drinkin' gourd

Follow the drinkin' gourd
Follow the drinkin' gourd
For the old man is waiting to carry you to freedom
Follow the drinkin' gourd

Well the river ends, between two hills
Follow the drinkin' gourd
There's another river on the other side
Follow the drinkin' gourd

Follow the drinkin' gourd
Follow the drinkin' gourd
For the old man is waiting to carry you to freedom
Follow the drinkin' gourd

Well, where the great big river meets the little river
Follow the drinkin' gourd
The old man is waiting to carry you to freedom
Follow the drinkin' gourd

Follow the drinkin' gourd
Follow the drinkin' gourd
For the old man is waiting to carry you to freedom
Follow the drinkin' gourd

For the old man is waiting just to carry you to freedom
If you follow the drinkin' gourd

== Meaning ==
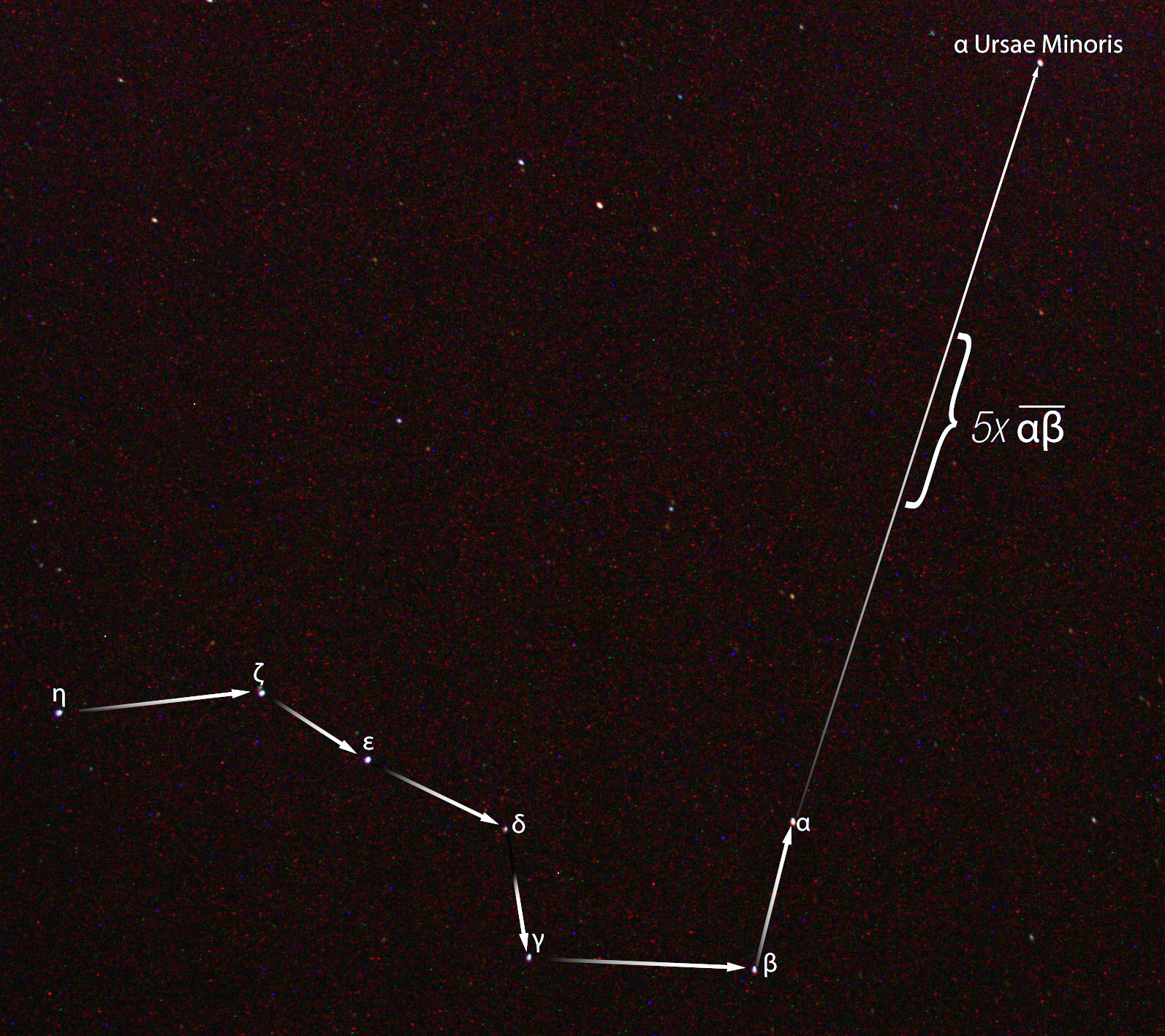
Polaris, the North Star, is found by imagining a line from Merak (β) to Dubhe (α) and then extending it for five times the distance after Dubhe (α) to Polaris (α Ursae Minoris).

Two of the stars in the Big Dipper line up very closely with and point to Polaris. Polaris is a circumpolar star, and so it is always seen close to the direction of true north. Therefore, escaping slaves could look for the Drinking Gourd and follow it to the North Star (Polaris) north to freedom. James Kelley has argued against the historicity of this interpretation in the Journal of Popular Culture.

== See also ==
- Songs of the Underground Railroad
- Pete Seeger
- Songlines
