= Steal Away =

"Steal Away (Song)"
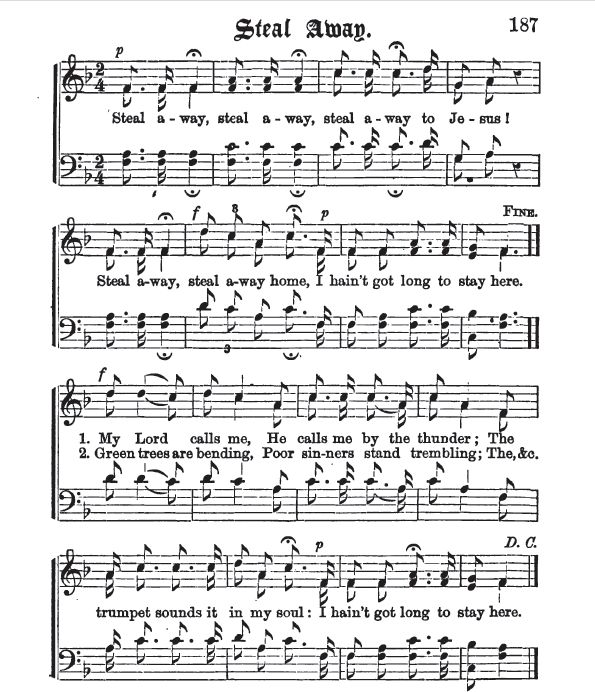
- Page from The Jubilee Singers, 1873

Song by Fisk Jubilee Singers (earliest attested)
- Written: Prior to 1860
- Genre: Spiritual
- Songwriters: Minerva Willis; Wallace Willis
- A 1902 recording by the Dinwiddie Colored Quartet: file; help

"Steal Away" ("Steal Away to Jesus") is an American spiritual. The song is well known by variations of the chorus:

Steal away, steal away, steal away to Jesus!
Steal away, steal away home, I hain't got long to stay here

Songs such as "Steal Away to Jesus", "Swing Low, Sweet Chariot", "Wade in the Water" and the "Gospel Train" are songs with hidden codes, not only about having faith in God, but containing hidden messages for slaves to run away on their own, or with the Underground Railroad.

The song was composed by Wallace Willis and his daughter Minerva Willis, slaves of a Choctaw Freedman in the old Indian Territory, sometime before 1862.

Alexander Reid, a minister at a Choctaw boarding school, heard Willis singing the songs and transcribed the words and melodies. He sent the music to the Jubilee Singers of Fisk University in Nashville, Tennessee. The Jubilee Singers then popularized the songs during a tour of the United States and Europe.

"Steal Away" is a standard Gospel song, and is found in the hymnals of many Protestant denominations.

An arrangement of the song is included in the oratorio A Child of Our Time, first performed in 1944, by the classical composer Michael Tippett (1908–98). Many recordings of the song have been made, including versions by Pat Boone and Nat King Cole. The song is also sung by "Jim", a USAAF airman played by John Kitzmiller, in the 1956 Slovene film "Valley of Peace".

== See also ==
- Songs of the Underground Railroad

== Bibliography ==
- Banks, Frances. "Narrative" from The WPA Oklahoma Slave Narratives edited by T. Lindsay Baker and Julie P. Baker (United States Work Projects Administration). University of Oklahoma Press, 1996. ISBN 0-8061-2792-9
- Flickinger, Robert Elliott. The Choctaw Freedmen and the Story of Oak Hill Industrial Academy, Valliant, McCurtain County, Oklahoma. Pittsburgh: Presbyterian Board of Missions for Freedmen, 1914. University of Nebraska Press, 2004. ISBN 0-8032-4787-7
- Pike, G. D. The Jubilee Singers and Their Campaign for Twenty Thousand Dollars, Lee And Shepard, Publishers, 1873.
- "The Film: Interview Transcripts: Raymond Dobard". Raymond Dobard, Ph.D., professor of art and art history on hidden meanings in spirituals.
