= Morley College Choir =

Morley College Choir was founded by Gustav Holst, during the period he was teaching music at Morley College. The choir was led for many years by Michael Tippett, who conducted the ensemble for the first-ever recording of Thomas Tallis' Spem in alium, and premiered a number of Tippett's works, including A Child of Our Time in March 1944.

The choir is known for presenting concerts of great variety and style and has recently performed choral works by Vivaldi (Gloria RV 588 and Gloria RV 589), Vaughan Williams (Fantasia on Christmas Carols, Five Folk English Songs, Five Mystical Songs), Haydn (Insanae et vanae curae, Paukenmesse, Te Deum), Beethoven (Mass in C major), and Handel (Coronation Anthems). Morley College Choir has also worked in partnership with other orchestral and choral ensembles including the BBC Concert Orchestra, the Camerata of London, and Chantage.

The choir was conducted by Jeremy Haneman from 2005 until 2010 and from 2012 by Simon Pettite.
