= Peg Leg Joe =

Eighteenth century abolitionist whose existence is disputed

- Known for: Legendary sailor and abolitionist associated with "Follow the Drinkin' Gourd"

Peg Leg Joe is a legendary sailor and underground railroad conductor, popularly associated with the song "Follow the Drinkin' Gourd". According to the folklorist H.B. Parks, who collected the song in the 1910s, Peg Leg Joe was an abolitionist who led enslaved people through the Underground Railroad to freedom during the last years of American slavery. In popular history, he is usually connected with an escape route which led from Alabama to the Ohio River. He may have been a real person or composite of people, but there is no reliable historical evidence of his existence. It is also possible that the story of Peg Leg Joe originates in the African mythical figure, Papa Legba. As his name suggests, Peg Leg Joe is depicted as having a prosthesis for his right leg.

== Follow the drinking gourd ==
Peg Leg Joe is widely credited online and in popular history with authoring "Follow the Drinkin' Gourd", which was supposedly a set of instructions leading fugitive slaves to safety in the northern states. It is likely that African Americans sang the tune in the latter half of the 19th century and early 20th century. The lyrics were first collected by H.B Parks and published in 1928 in the journal of the Texas Folklore Society, with a slightly different version collected by Lee Hays and recorded in 1947.

Modern popular interpretations of the song, based on Parks' initial account, suggest that it encodes a route from Alabama to the northern states; specifying the time of year in which the journey should be undertaken, guiding the fugitives along the Tombigbee River, across "the hills", then onto the Tennessee River and finally the Ohio River. These interpretations state that the escaped slaves would then be met by members of the Underground Railroad, possibly by Peg Leg Joe himself. The accounts also suggest that the song indicates that dead trees along the escape route may have been marked with a left foot and a peg foot sign, symbolising Peg Leg Joe. This interpretation relies on inferences from the obscure lyrics of the song as well as Parks' initial account of its collection.

=== Parks' account ===
The name Peg Leg Joe does not appear in the song, it instead mentions an "old man" who is waiting to "carry you to freedom", and includes the line "Left foot, peg foot, traveling on". Parks, in his 1928 article, stated that he had collected the song from African-American informants at various locations in the American South, with the fullest version obtained from a man in College Station, Texas. In his explanation of the song to Parks, the man described a peg-legged sailor who travelled through southern plantations, staying in one place for a few weeks working as a carpenter and teaching the song to the local slaves. He would then lay a trail north, marking dead trees on the route north with a footprint and a circle, representing the peg leg. The following spring, slaves would follow this trail to freedom in the north. Parks then writes that he mentioned the song to his unnamed white great-uncle who had heard it. Parks states that the great-uncle then informed him that he had seen written records connected to the song, and that it referred to "Peg Leg Joe", a member of the Underground Railroad, who he claimed was active "north of Mobile" and who had made his last trip to the South in 1859.

=== Historicity ===
The existence of Peg Leg Joe, and the analysis of the song as a coded guide for escaping enslaved people, has been repeated uncritically in popular history books, children's stories and on the internet. However, academic James Kelley argues that there is very slim evidence for Parks' original reading of the text. He suggests that the song may in fact have had a spiritual significance and express a more general desire for escape to freedom in the north, without encoding any specific information useful for escapees. Kelley is suspicious of Parks claim that his uncle knew of Peg Leg Joe and views his triple discovery of the song as "strained coincidences". He argues that mentioning the white great uncle's memory of reading about a sailor called "Peg leg Joe" was in fact designed to legitimise the story told to him by his black informant. Kelley further argues that Peg Leg Joe may represent the African lwa, Papa Legba. Papa Legba is frequently depicted as an old man with a cane or crutch, who acts as a guide and dispenses wisdom which aids a traveller in reaching their destination.

The editors of collections containing Parks' account of the song's discovery, B.A. Botkin and Alan Dundes, also cast doubt on the historicity of Peg Leg Joe.

== Literary depictions ==
In the children's book Follow the Drinking Gourd by Jeanette Winter, Peg Leg Joe would pretend to be a carpenter at a targeted plantation. There he would teach the enslaved people "Follow the Drinking Gourd", which contained a code leading the enslaved people to freedom along the Underground Railroad.

== See also ==
- Harriet Tubman
- Songs of the Underground Railroad
