= Ute Selbig =

German opera singer

- Born: Dresden, Germany
- Occupation: Classical Soprano

Ute Selbig is German soprano in opera and concert. She has been a member of the Semperoper from 1985. She recorded Bach's Mass in B minor and St Matthew Passion with the Thomanerchor conducted by Georg Christoph Biller.
