= Umansky =

Umansky (Ukrainian: Уманський, romanized: Umanśkij) is a Ukrainian language locational surname, which means a person from Uman, Ukraine. Notable people with the name include:

- Ellen Umansky (born 1950), American religious scholar
- Jean Umansky, French sound engineer
- Kaye Umansky (born 1946), British writer
- Konstantin Umansky (1902–1945), Russian diplomat and writer
- Laura Umansky (born 1979), American businesswoman
- Leonid A. Umansky (1890–1957), Russian electrical engineer
- Mauricio Umansky (born 1970), American real estate agent
- Mikhail Umansky (1952–2010), Russian chess player
