= Food Paradise season 7 =

Food Paradise
- Season 7
- No. of episodes: 6

Release
- Original network: Travel Channel
- Original release: August 12 – September 9, 2015

Season chronology
- ← Previous; Season 6 Next → Season 8

The seventh season of Food Paradise, an American food reality television series narrated by Jess Blaze Snider (formally Mason Pettit) on the Travel Channel, premiered on August 12, 2015. First-run episodes of the series aired in the United States on the Travel Channel on Mondays at 10:00 p.m. EDT. The season contained 6 episodes and concluded airing on September 9, 2015.

Food Paradise features the best places to find various cuisines at food locations across America. Each episode focuses on a certain type of restaurant, such as "Diners", "Bars", "Drive-Thrus" or "Breakfast" places that people go to find a certain food specialty.

== Episodes ==
=== Seafood Paradise 2 ===
Restaurant	Location	Specialty(s)
San Pedro Fish Market & Restaurant	San Pedro, California	World Famous Shrimp Tray (choose from any kind of shrimp, fish filet, whole fish, shellfish, crab, or lobster served "California-style", grilled with butter and secret spices, served with grilled fajita vegetables, potatoes and a loaf of garlic bread); "Classic Combo" (tray of grilled jumbo Ecuadorian shrimp and Main lobster); Huachinango (Mexican red snapper, butterflied, coated with a secret spicy tomato-based wet barbecue rub and grilled); "Super Combo" (tray of grilled salmon, 4 kinds of shrimp, jumbo scallops, littleneck clams, black mussels, calamari, and green mussels from New Zealand)
Drago's Seafood Restaurant & Oyster Bar	New Orleans, Louisiana	Charbroiled Oysters (flame-grilled local oysters on the half shell with their famous butter-garlic sauce made with black pepper, Italian seasoning and double chopped garlic and topped with cheese)
Gigi's Sotto Mare Oysteria & Seafood Restaurant	North Beach, San Francisco, California	Cioppino (Italian fish stew invented in San Francisco in the 1800s. It consists of fish stock made from a burnt onion, carrot, white onion, celery, pepper and parsley monkfish, Branzino, European seabass, red snapper, along with, crab, mussels, clams, calamari, prawns, bay shrimp and scallops topped with tomato sauce made from olive oil, garlic, celery, onions and butter, heaped onto a bed of penne pasta in a silver pot that serves two)
Jimmy Cantler's Riverside Inn	Annapolis, Maryland	Jumbo Lump Crab Cakes (Maryland blue claw crabmeat steamed with Old Bay seasoning and mixed with mayonnaise, Tabasco , salt, parsley, dried mustard, paprika, and Worcestershire sauce, form into two 5-ounce balls, baked and served with a lemon wedge, seasoned fries and coleslaw); Softshell Crab (two softshell crabs dredged in seasoned flour and deep-fried served with hushpuppies)
Red's Eats	Wiscasset, Maine	Lobster Roll (fresh Maine lobster knuckles tails and claw meat from Atlantic Edge Lobster, steamed on a toasted and buttered New England–style hot dog roll and served with hot drawn butter and mayonnaise on the side)
Fleet Landing Restaurant	Charleston, South Carolina	Low Country Shrimp & Grits (sautéed local jumbo white shrimp on a bed of 10-ounce portion of grits made with heavy cream, ladled with gravy, a roux made from bacon fat, flour and baked to brown and sautéed with the Trinity of diced red bell peppers, green bell peppers and red onions, de-glazed with white wine, shrimp and beef stock, and served with sliced Andouille sausage); Fried Green Crab Napoleon (panko-coated deep-fried green tomatoes layered with crab salad made with little-lump meat, fresh tarragon, Old Bay, and granulated garlic, drizzled with shellfish cream sauce made from shrimp and crab stock and chili oil, topped with mixed green and carrot curls)
Frenchy's Rockaway Grill	Clearwater, Florida	Original Grouper Sandwich (fresh local grouper, beer-battered, deep-fried and topped with American cheese, lettuce, tomato and tartar sauce on a toasted onion bun); Grouper Reuben (sautéed grouper dusted with seasoning and butter, topped with sauerkraut, Swiss cheese and Thousand Island dressing on toasted marble rye bread); Buffalo Grouper Sandwich (deep-fried grouper drenched in buffalo hot sauce and topped with chunky blue cheese)
The Daily Catch	North End, Boston, Massachusetts	Lobster Fra Diavolo (local hard-shell lobster, clams, P.E.I. mussels, domestic shrimp, local scallops, and native calamari sautéed in extra virgin olive oil, fresh garlic, anchovies, crushed red pepper, and white wine, along with homemade fish tomato sauce, all served over house-made linguini or black pasta made with squid ink); Monkfish Marsala (breaded lightly fried monkfish sautéed with mushrooms, marsala wine made from raisins, prunes and figs, squeeze of fresh lemon and butter)

=== Late Night Paradise ===
Restaurant	Location	Specialty(s)
B.A.D. Burger	New York City, New York	B.A.D. (Brunch All Day). Pulled Pork Benedict (pork butt dry-rubbed with garlic, cumin, salt, pepper, fresh-ground espresso coffee, pulled and caramelized with barbecue sauce, topped with two poached eggs, and drizzled with chipotle-hollandaise on deep-fried hash-brown buns made out of mashed-up home fries and sweet potatoes, buttermilk and breading served with apple slaw); "Thanksgiving Burger" (beef patty grilled on flat-top with clarified butter and salt topped with mashed potatoes, secret brown gravy, cranberry sauce and crispy fried onion strings)
Delia's Chicken Sausage Stand	Atlanta, Georgia	"The Hot Mess" (chicken sausage made with chicken thighs, paprika, cayenne, crushed red pepper and brown sugar, dipped in "comeback sauce", a tomato-and-vinegar-based barbecue dip, topped with homemade black bean & chicken chili, pickled jalapenos and shredded cheddar, drizzled with beer & cheese sauce on a Philly-style Amoroso roll); "Sloppy Sliders" (chicken sausage patties, topped with comeback sauce, beer & cheese sauce and pickled jalapenos on tiny slider buns)
Five Bucks Drinkery	St. Petersburg, Florida	Mac-N-Cheese Melt (pork butt dry-rubbed with blackened-redfish seasoning, black pepper, salt, diced green bell peppers, and onions, along with local beer, pulled and topped with American cheese, barbecue sauce, and macaroni & cheese made with shell pasta on buttered toast); Texas Burger (80/20 beef patty topped with pepper jack cheese, jalapenos, and onion rings, drizzled with sriracha aioli on butter-toasted buns); Fried Bacon (deep-fried and served with maple syrup)
Surly Girl Saloon	Short North, Columbus, Ohio	"Swashbuckler's Super Supper Tray" ("pigs in a biscuit"—roast pork dry-rubbed with cumin, red pepper flakes and Jamaican jerk seasoning, pulled and placed in a pot with caramelized onions, sautéed garlic, and pork & chicken stock, de-glazed with orange juice on a pair of buttermilk biscuit sliders, served with mashed potatoes, steamed broccoli and a "boozy cupcake" chocolate cake laced with vodka topped with vanilla icing and a cherry); "Corn Chip Pie" (beef & bean chili topped with shredded cheese and Fritos corn chips, scallions and special sour cream); "Boozy Cupcakes": Root Beer Bourbon Cupcake (root beer-infused cake frosted with bourbon buttercream)
Ms. P's Electric Cock (food trailer)	Austin, Texas	Crispy Fried Chicken (three-piece chicken parts dunked in a buttermilk wet dredge with secret hot sauce, dipped in spiced flour, deep-fried in peanut oil, garnished with parsley and escabeche, or pickled whole jalapeno and onions, served with a sweet roll)
Ian's Pizza	Madison, Wisconsin	Mac N' Cheese Pizza (20-inch dough topped with local mozzarella, boiled elbow macaroni noodles, and homemade crème fraiche, along with shredded Wisconsin cheddar cheese); Barbecue Brisket & Tater Tots Pizza (topped with local mozzarella, disk-shaped tater tots, and 18-hour smoked beef brisket, drizzled with homemade barbecue sauce)
Cooter Brown's Tavern & Oyster Bar	Uptown, New Orleans, Louisiana	"Bayou Philly" (Philadelphia cheesesteak-inspired sandwich consisting of grilled local Gulf shrimp, alligator sausage, Trinity or onion-and-pepper mix, slices of American cheese and pepper jack on a Leidenheimer French baguette); Muffuletta (salami, ham, and mortadella topped with Swiss cheese, provolone, and Italian olive salad on a big round sesame seed bun, served warm to melt the cheese unlike other muffulettas)
The Fat Shack	Fort Collins, Colorado	"Late Night Done Right" serving New Jersey–style Fat sandwiches: "The Fat Shack Sandwich" (deep-fried chicken tenders, onion rings, French fries, jalapeno poppers, mozzarella sticks, and Philly-cheesesteak meat with two slices of American cheese, and drizzled with honey mustard sauce on a fresh-baked hoagie roll); Deep-Fried Oreos; Deep-Fried Rice Krispies Treats

=== Mac N' Cheese Paradise ===
Restaurant	Location	Specialty(s)
M.A.C.S. Macaroni and Cheese Shop	Wisconsin Dells, Wisconsin	Chili Mac (house-recipe cheese sauce made from local dairy milk, secret seasoning, local American cheese and mozzarella, chilled roux of butter & flour, ladled over ribbed elbow macaroni, topped with homemade tomato-based chili with chopped beef, onions, butter and secret spices, kidney beans and ketchup, garnished with shredded cheddar cheese, chopped onions, chives, sour cream and Frito corn chips served with "toasties", or toasted bread in a personal cast-iron skillet); "Hangover Mac" (a.k.a. "The Mac Gowan", cheddar, pepper jack, mozzarella, mac n’ cheese, bacon, Miller Park hot dog, caramelized onions, mushrooms, green pepper, hash browns, baked with garlic breadcrumbs and drizzled with sriracha and served with garlic bread toasties)
Mac Shack	Clinton Hill, Brooklyn, New York	Jerk Chicken Mac (chicken breasts marinated in garlic, oil and adobo spice, homemade spicy Béchamel sauce made with Oscar's Jerk Seasoning, elbow noodles, layered with gouda, Fontina and Swiss cheeses, topped with breadcrumbs and parsley, baked in oven and served in a tin dish)
Mac! Mac & Cheesery	Portland, Oregon	"Cheeseburger Mac! And Cheese" (roux made from rice flour, powdered milk, non-daily creamer, secret spices, local cheddar, local chopped beef, bacon bits, caramelized onions, and parboiled elbow pasta, topped with crushed barbecue potato chips served in a skillet); Poutine Mac (elbow noodles covered in brown gravy made from pulled pork drippings and beef stock and topped with deep-fried cheese curbs)
Smoke Modern Barbeque	Basalt, Colorado	Serves up 8 different kinds of over-the-top mac n’ cheese: Crawfish Étouffée Mac N’ Cheese (toasted roux made with flour, butter, garlic, Creole tomatoes, white wine the trinity or pepper, celery and onions, lobster broth, crawfish meat, tomatoes cooked in Kentucky bourbon ladled with a three-cheese cheese sauce, elbow macaroni baked in a casserole dish and topped with shredded pepper jack cheese, deep-fried popcorn crawfish tails, white sauce, garnished with scallions and diced tomatoes); Brunt Ends Mac N' Cheese (12-hour Kansas City–style beef brisket smoked with Missouri hickory and Colorado applewood, cut off the ends, diced and grilled with Kentucky bourbon and barbecue sauce, elbows ladled with pepper jack cheese sauce, broiled and topped with shredded cheddar and garnished with tomatoes and scallions)
Cheese-ology Macaroni & Cheese - CLOSED	The Delmar Loop, St. Louis, Missouri	"The Hill" (named after St. Louis’ Little Italy, a pizza and mac combo made with premade béchamel sauce, elbow noodles, local processed Provel cheese, Italian sausage or "salsiccia" made with fennel, topped with fresh local marinara sauce, baked in oven and served in cast-iron skillets); Beer Cheese & Bratwurst Mac (made with sharp cheddar, garlic powder, cayenne pepper, hot sauce, and local pale ale, mixed with béchamel, elbows, brats and baked)
Elbows Mac N' Cheese	Cerritos, California	Masala Mac (chicken tikka masala made with yogurt, salt and special spice blend shipped from Gujarat, India of cloves, coriander, cardamom, and ground red chilies, blended with fresh garlic and rubbed over chicken, char-grilled, and diced, mixed into béchamel with tomato-and-ginger-based sauce and tikka masala spice, elbow noodles, topped with sharp cheddar and mozzarella, baked and served in a casserole dish); Fajita Mac (béchamel made with fajita spice mix, crushed red pepper, garlic chili paste, sharp cheddar, mozzarella, pepper jack, elbow noodles, breadcrumbs, baked and topped with flame-roasted red & green bell peppers, sautéed onions and grilled top sirloin steak, garnished with a lime and tortilla chips)
Five Fifty-Five	Portland, Maine	Truffled Lobster Mac & Cheese (roux of butter and flour mixed hot cream and milk for a béchamel, blended with five different cheeses of gruyere, cheddar, Parmesan, fontina, and mascarpone for a Mornay sauce, combined with fresh Maine lobster meat cooked in drawn butter and torchio pasta, topped with Italian black truffles, drizzled with truffle oil and garnished with chives and waffle-cut potato chips)
Mac The Cheese Truck	Atlanta, Georgia	BBQ Mac (elbow macaroni blended with a béchamel made with ground mustard, white pepper, cracked black pepper, salt, cornstarch, and shredded cheddar cheese, topped with 10-12 hour smoked pulled pork with house-made special dry rub drizzled with homemade barbecue sauce, served with homemade pimento cheese and a pickle slice)

=== Street Food Paradise ===
Restaurant	Location	Specialty(s)
Bacon Bacon (food truck)	San Francisco, California	"Bacon Fried Chicken Sandwich" (chicken breast soaked in buttermilk, coated in breading and "bacon magic dust" or ground bacon and deep-fried, topped with bacon, sriracha coleslaw, and bacon mayonnaise on a toasted brioche bun); Bacon Jam (pork fat, cooked bacon, onions, garlic brown sugar, cider vinegar, honey and local roasted coffee); Bacon Grilled Cheese (cheddar cheese, crispy bacon and bacon jam on thick-sliced pandemain bread grilled on bacon grease)
Eats & Treats (food truck)	Milwaukee, Wisconsin	Home of the Waffle Dogs: "Beer Brat Waffle" (local bratwurst, grilled and wrapped around a beer-battered waffle on a stick, drizzled with syrup); Spicy Jalapeno Cheddar Waffle (cheese-filled bratwurst stuffed in a waffle made with pickled jalapenos and chili powder)
Potato Champion (food trailer)	Portland, Oregon	Poutine (Canadian-style fry dish made the Oregon way with local number two russet potatoes, cut into fries, twice deep-fried and topped with cheese curds and drizzled with brown gravy made with mushrooms, garlic, onions, balsamic vinegar, ground bacon and beef stock made from pig's feet, beef knuckles, beef marrow bones, celery, carrots, onions and camellia salts); "PBJ Fries" (fries topped with a Thai-based peanut sauce made from garlic, ginger, onions, cilantro, sesame oil, sweet soy sauce, coconut milk lime juice and homemade peanut butter, and local raspberry jam modified with brown sugar, ground sugar, lemon juice and liquid smoke)
The Que Crawl (food trailer)	New Orleans, Louisiana	"Creolina" combines North Carolina barbecue and traditional New Orleans fare: "Pulled Pork Po' Boy" (chili powder & black pepper-rubbed pork butt, 7-hour smoked, oven-roasted, pulled and marinated in Lexington barbecue sauce made with cider vinegar, salt, pepper, shaved sweet onions, garlic, ketchup, and red Thai chilies, topped with purple cabbage coleslaw on bread from a Vietnamese bakery); "Shrimp Po' Boy" (jumbo Gulf white shrimp sautéed with butter, lemon, scallions and Cajun barbecue sauce made from local beer, hot sauce and Worcestershire sauce stuffed into hollowed out bread)
I Dream of Weenie (Food truck/VW Bus)	East Nashville, Nashville, Tennessee	"The Triple H Weenie" (char-grilled beef hot dog topped with hash brown casserole made from cream of potato soup, ground black pepper, salt, garlic powder, chopped onions, butter and shredded cheese and shredded potatoes, also topped with pickled jalapenos and hollandaise sauce); "Porter Road Butcher Chorizo Weenie" (locally sourced chorizo sausage topped with tangy jicama slaw made from blended onions, tomatillos, poblano peppers jalapenos, jicama, cilantro, olive oil, sugar, salt and garlic, also topped with sour cream and avocado slices on an artesian bun)
Hey PB&J (food truck)	Denver, Colorado	"Figgy Piggy" (grilled sandwich made with almond butter, homemade California Black Mission fig jam, goat cheese, thick-cut bacon strips, and locally sourced rosemary honey, grilled on a flat-top in clarified butter); "Thai PB&J" (Thai peanut butter sauce made with fresh ginger, dark brown sugar, lemon juice, chili pepper flakes and soy sauce, along with orange marmalade, crushed peanuts, coconut flakes, and fresh basil on grilled white bread)
Babycakes (food truck)	Chicago, Illinois	Gourmet pancakes: "Deep Dish Sausage Pizza Pancakes" (savory pancakes made from yeast, butter, flour and cornmeal, cooked with ground pork seasoned with sage, thyme, oregano and basil, spiced with, garlic powder, kosher salt, pepper and cayenne, basil, provolone and mozzarella, topped with homemade marinara, and Parmesan cheese); "Steak Tamale Pancake" (maseco or lime-cured cornmeal pancakes cooked with skirt steak seasoned with Adobo, topped with Mexican cotija cheese and fresh-made roasted tomato garlic salsa and cilantro)
The Urban Oven (food truck)	Grand Park, Los Angeles, California	Wood-fire oven gourmet pizza: "The Mateo" (personal pizza topped with fresh whole milk mozzarella with buffalo matzo, thinly sliced Yukon gold potatoes, caramelized onions, Applewood-smoked bacon crumbles, and an egg in the center); "Fennel Sausage Pizza" (topped with fresh Italian fennel sausage made from pork butt, red pepper flakes, salt, sugar, garlic, Italian parsley and toasted fennel seeds, tangy Pomodoro tomato sauce, shredded mozzarella and dusted with fennel plant pollen)

=== Pizza Paradise 3 ===
Restaurant	Location	Specialty(s)
Pizza Rock	Las Vegas, Nevada	"The Mob Boss" (huge Sicilian-style pizza with 72-hour fermented dough baked with olive oil, topped with tomato sauce, shredded mozzarella, Italian salami, garlic, mushrooms, red, yellow & green bell peppers, red onions, black olives, pepperoni, Portuguese pork sausage and bacon, topped off with scallions, cherry tomatoes, pecorino romano and garlic olive oil)
Paulie Gee's Pizza	Greenpoint, Brooklyn, New York	"Ricotta Be Kiddin’ Me" (New York–style pizza dough topped with fresh mozzarella, Italian fennel sausage, fresh basil, Canadian bacon, baked in a wood-fire oven and topped with dollops of ricotta cheese); "I Feel Like Bacon Love" (thin crust dough topped with secret tomato sauce made with a Vidalia onion, salted butter and thick-cut hickory-smoked bacon, also topped with romano and mozzarella, then sprinkled with cracked black pepper)
Mathew's Pizzeria	Highlandtown, Baltimore, Maryland	"Anna's Stuffed Pie" (deep-dish pizza pie topped with 100-year-old secret recipe tomato sauce made with three different types of tomatoes, shredded mozzarella, two kinds of Italian meats, baked in oven, then topped with another crust topped with tomato sauce and mozzarella and baked again); "Crab Pie" (deep-dish dough topped with mozzarella, Argentinian Reggianito cheese, Parmesan, chopped onions, and Maryland "Krab" blue claw crabmeat, and Old Bay seasoning)
Lou Eddie's Pizza	Skyforest, California	"White Out" (pizza dough topped with four different cheeses: shredded mozzarella, Parmesan, fresh-made ricotta and asiago on a bed of béchamel sauce, along with fresh-roasted garlic chunks); "Baja Fiesta" (dough topped with mozzarella, spicy barbecue sauce, fried-roasted chicken chunks, yellow poblanos, green jalapenos, and house-made chorizo)
Pequod's Pizza	Chicago, Illinois	"Deep Dish" (5-pound pizza with caramelized crust in a "seasoned" deep-dish pan, layered with mozzarella cheese slices, tomato sauce, giardiniera, pepperoni, mushrooms, green & red peppers and sausage, sprinkled with romano cheese and oregano); "Thin Crust" (dough topped with house-made tomato sauce, red & green bell peppers, black olives, then topped with slices of mozzarella, pepperoni, and chopped white onions)
Apizza Scholls	Portland, Oregon	"Bacon Bianca" (thin-crust pre-fermented pizza dough topped with whole-milk age mozzarella slices, Applewood-smoked pork belly bacon cured with brown sugar & salt, and chopped garlic, sprinkled with mixed herbs and pecorino romano cheese); "Sausage Mama" (topped with mozzarella slices, tomato sauce, Parmesan, house-made sweet fennel sausage, and Mama Lil's goathorn pickled red peppers)
Pizza Lucé	Minneapolis, Minnesota	"Baked Potato Pizza" (signature whole-wheat dough topped with garlic butter, baby red mashed potatoes, made with fresh roasted garlic, white & black pepper, heavy whipping cream, then topped with broccoli, Roma tomatoes, shredded cheddar cheese, and Applewood-smoked bacon, served with a side of sour cream); "The Bear" (dough topped with tomato sauce, mozzarella, five kinds of meat: Canadian bacon, pepperoni, marinated chicken, seasoned ground beef, and Calabrese sausage, and oregano)
Via 313 Pizza (food trailer) @ Craft Pride	Austin, Texas	"Authentic Detroit-style pizza" (square dough topped upside down: dough, cheese, sauce); "The Detroiter" (dough layered with natural-casing pepperoni, high-moisture mozzarella, also placed on the rim of the pan for caramelization, and another layer of pepperoni, baked in a small cast-iron square pan, tomato sauce after bake and sprinkled with oregano); "The Cadillac" (topped with mozzarella, prosciutto, gorgonzola, and fig jam, grated fresh Parmesan, and drizzled with balsamic glaze)

=== Local Legends ===
Restaurant	Location	Specialty(s)
Fatso's Last Stand	Ukrainian Village, Chicago, Illinois	"Chicago Char Dog" (Chicago-style hot dog: char-grilled 100% Vienna beef hot dog topped with 7 ingredients which include, yellow mustard, relish, diced onions, two slices of tomatoes, a dill pickle spear, two sport peppers, and sprinkled with celery salt on a steamed poppy seed bun); "The Fatso Special" (char-grilled beef hot dog and Polish sausage topped with homemade mac & cheese with salami and grilled onions on a cheddar cheese-smeared toasted bun)
South Beach Bar and Grille	Ocean Beach, San Diego, California	"Baja Fish Taco" (deep-fried tempura-battered Alaskan pollock topped with shredded cheddar cheese, red cabbage and salsa Fresca on a grilled tortilla and drizzled with secret white sauce consisting of buttermilk range dressing served with lime wedges); "Mahi Mahi Fish Taco" (grilled pineapple-teriyaki marinated mahi-mahi topped with cheese, red cabbage, salsa and white sauce on a grilled tortilla)
Pleasant Ridge Chili	Cincinnati, Ohio	"Chili Spaghetti" or "Chili Three-Way" (100% lean ground beef chili made from salt, paprika, dried chili peppers, garlic powder, ground oregano, and other secret spices, bay leaves and onions, sauced over spaghetti, and topped with a handful of shredded Wisconsin cheddar); "Chili Five-Way" (beef chili on top of spaghetti, topped with red beans, cooked chopped onions and a mound of cheddar cheese); "Cheese Coney Dog" (hot dogs topped with yellow mustard, onions, chili and shredded cheese)
Bo Brooks Restaurant	Canton, Baltimore, Maryland	Chesapeake Bay Blue Crabs (40-year-old recipe steamed in pickle juice, beer and water, and seasoned with Old Bay, salt and black pepper); Jumbo Lump Crab Cakes (two softball-sized crab cakes made with jumbo lump crab and back fin crab, bread crumbs and parsley in a sauce made from Poulet mayonnaise, seafood seasoning consisting of salt, pepper, bay leaves and cayenne, Worcestershire sauce, cayenne pepper, Dijon mustard and lemon juice, and baked in oven, served with mashed potatoes and corn on the cob)
Busy Bee Southern Cookin'	Atlanta, Georgia	Fried Chicken (chicken pieces in brine for 12 hours, spiced with a secret salt-base, coated in seasoned flour consisted of salt, black & white pepper, onion powder and garlic powder, and pressure-fried in peanut oil, served with two homemade sides like mac & cheese, cream corn, collard greens, fried green tomatoes, fried okra, mashed potatoes, green beans and sweet potatoes, and cornbread)
Bleecker Street Pizza	West Village, New York City, New York	"Nonna Maria" (signature pie of owner's grandma, Maria's recipe: New York–style pizza made with thin-crust dough dipped in toasted breadcrumbs, seasonings, and Romano cheese, topped with aged shredded mozzarella, slices of fresh young mozzarella, dollops of homemade rich, thick, chunky tomato sauce, aged Parmesan Reggiano, ribbons of basil and drizzled with extra virgin olive oil)
Desire Bistro & Oyster Bar	Bourbon Street, New Orleans, Louisiana	"Creole Trio" (features gumbo made from toasted crab shells stock, brown roux, the "holy trinity" of onions, peppers, celery, bay leaves, along with chicken, sausage, shrimp and okra; jambalaya made with chicken, sausage, holy trinity, secret seasonings, and lemon juice, rice, tomatoes, spices and homemade stock, and sauce made from two different kinds of onions, chopped garlic sautéed in oil, de-glazed with white & red wines and basil; and red beans and rice)
Steve's Prince of Steaks	Philadelphia, Pennsylvania	"Philly Cheesesteak" (flat-grilled thinly cut domestic rib-eye steak topped with sautéed chopped onions, and yellow Cheese Wiz drizzled on the meat on a toasted hoagie roll)
