= Robert Henle =

Robert Henle may refer to:

- Robert A. Henle (1924–1989), electrical engineer
- Robert J. Henle (1909–2001), President of Georgetown University
