= Fairman =

Fairman is both a surname and a given name.

== Surname ==
- Bob Fairman (1885–1916), English footballer who played as a full-back or wing half
- Charles E. Fairman (1856–1934), American physician who published in the field of mycology
- Christopher M. Fairman (1960–2015), professor of law at the Ohio State University Moritz College of Law
- Jack Fairman (1913–2002), British racing driver from England
- James Fairman (1826–1904), Scottish-born American landscape painter
- James F. Fairman (1896–1967), American electrical engineer who received the IEEE Edison Medal in 1959
- James Fairman Fielder (1867–1954), American politician of the Democratic party
- Michael Fairman (born 1934), American actor and writer
- Paul W. Fairman (1909–1977), editor and writer in a variety of genres
- Simon Fairman (1792–1857), inventor of the lathe chuck in 1830

== Given name ==
- Fairman Rogers (1833–1900), American civil engineer, educator, and philanthropist from Philadelphia

== See also ==
- Orrin and Roxanne Fairman Kinyon House, private house located at 7675 N. Ridge Road in Canton, Michigan
- The Fairman Rogers Four-in-Hand (originally titled A May Morning in the Park) is an 1879–80 painting by Thomas Eakins
