= McEachron =

McEachron is a surname. Notable people with the surname include:

- Gordon McEachron (1919–1993), American football coach and United States Army Air Forces officer
- Karl B. McEachron (1889–1954), American electrical engineer
- Trevor McEachron (born 1983), American soccer player

== See also ==
- MacEachron
