= Engineering Society of Detroit =

Regional engineering association

The Engineering Society of Detroit (also known as ESD) is a regional engineering association, headquartered in Southfield, Michigan, serving engineers and related technical professionals in Southeast Michigan. The Society was founded in 1895 by a group of graduates from the University of Michigan, originally calling it the Detroit Association of Graduate Engineers.

Individual Members of ESD can be elected to the grade of "Fellow" by the ESD Board of directors. The existing College of Fellows nominates candidates for the consideration of the Board of directors. Fellows are designated by the post-nominal FESD. Notable Fellows of ESD have included or do include Alex Dow, Henry Ford, Henry Ford II, Lee Iacocca, Albert Kahn, Keith Crain, Dr. David Cole and G. Richard Wagoner, Jr.
