= Notasulga, Alabama =

- Town
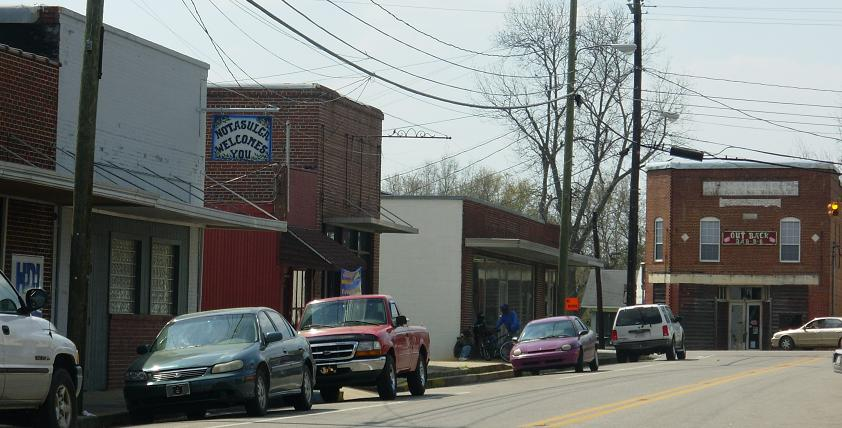
- Notasulga in 2007

- Macon County, Alabama
- Coordinates: 32°33′26″N 85°40′09″W
- Country: United States
- State: Alabama
- Counties: Macon, Lee

Government
  - Mayor: Tommy Miller

Area
  - Total: 14.12 sq mi (36.57 km^{2})
  - Land: 13.97 sq mi (36.17 km^{2})
  - Water: 0.15 sq mi (0.40 km^{2})
- Elevation: 489 ft (149 m)

Population (2020)
  - Total: 914
  - Density: 65.4/sq mi (25.27/km^{2})
- Time zone: UTC-6 (CST)
  - Summer (DST): UTC-5 (CDT)
- ZIP code: 36866
- Area code: 334
- FIPS code: 01-55440
- GNIS feature ID: 2407012
- Website: Notasulga

Notasulga is a town in Macon and Lee counties in the U.S. state of Alabama. As of the 2020 census, the population of the town was 914. The portion in Lee County is part of the Auburn Metropolitan Area. According to the 1910 U.S. Census, it incorporated in 1893. Author Zora Neale Hurston was born in Notasulga in 1891. The town name comes from the Creek words noti sulgi, which means "many teeth".

== Geography ==
Notasulga is located in northern Macon County. The town extends northeast into the western part of Lee County.

According to the U.S. Census Bureau, the town has a total area of 14.1 square miles (36.6 km^{2}), of which 14.0 square miles (36.2 km^{2}) are land and 0.2 square miles (0.4 km^{2}), or 1.09%, are water. The center of town is on a height of land, draining north to Saugahatchee Creek, a west-flowing tributary of the Tallapoosa River, and south to Red Creek, a tributary of Uphapee Creek, which also flows west to the Tallapoosa.

== Demographics ==
Historical population
Census	Pop.	Note	%±
1880	236		—
1890	332		40.7%
1910	512		—
1920	619		20.9%
1930	756		22.1%
1940	863		14.2%
1950	816		−5.4%
1960	884		8.3%
1970	833		−5.8%
1980	876		5.2%
1990	979		11.8%
2000	916		−6.4%
2010	965		5.3%
2020	914		−5.3%
U.S. Decennial Census; 2013 Estimate

As of the census of 2000, there were 916 people, 393 households, and 260 families residing in the town. The population density was 65.9 inhabitants per square mile (25.4/km^{2}). There were 446 housing units at an average density of 32.1 per square mile (12.4/km^{2}). The racial makeup of the town was 66.27% White, 32.42% Black or African American, 0.22% Native American, 0.55% from other races, and 0.55% from two or more races. 0.76% of the population were Hispanic or Latino of any race.

There were 393 households, out of which 26.2% had children under the age of 18 living with them, 48.6% were married couples living together, 14.0% had a female householder with no husband present, and 33.6% were non-families. 29.5% of all households were made up of individuals, and 11.5% had someone living alone who was 65 years of age or older. The average household size was 2.33 and the average family size was 2.87.

In the town, the population was spread out, with 23.4% under the age of 18, 7.8% from 18 to 24, 24.8% from 25 to 44, 28.2% from 45 to 64, and 15.9% who were 65 years of age or older. The median age was 40 years. For every 100 females, there were 86.6 males. For every 100 females age 18 and over, there were 81.9 males.

The median income for a household in the town was $31,307, and the median income for a family was $34,479. Males had a median income of $27,500 versus $18,684 for females. The per capita income for the town was $17,115. About 10.7% of families and 17.8% of the population were below the poverty line, including 20.8% of those under age 18 and 11.2% of those age 65 or over.

== Government ==
Notasulga elects a mayor and five city council members every four years.

2017 Mayor and Council:

- Mayor - Tommy Miller
- Council District 1 - Cecil R. Langford, Jr.
- Council District 2 - Denise Pilato
- Council District 3 - Cline Carmack
- Council District 4 - Scott Barnhart
- Council District 5 - Robin Collins

== Notable people ==
- Valerie Boyd, journalist, author and cultural critic
- Pat Dye, former American football player, coach, and college athletics administrator
- John K. Hodnette, electrical engineer who was awarded the IEEE Edison Medal in 1957
- Zora Neale Hurston, anthropologist, novelist
- J. Ed Livingston, jurist and the twenty-third Chief Justice of the Alabama Supreme Court
- Gerald Robinson, former National Football League defensive end
- George Scott (1929-2005), vocalist for gospel music group The Blind Boys of Alabama

== Gallery ==
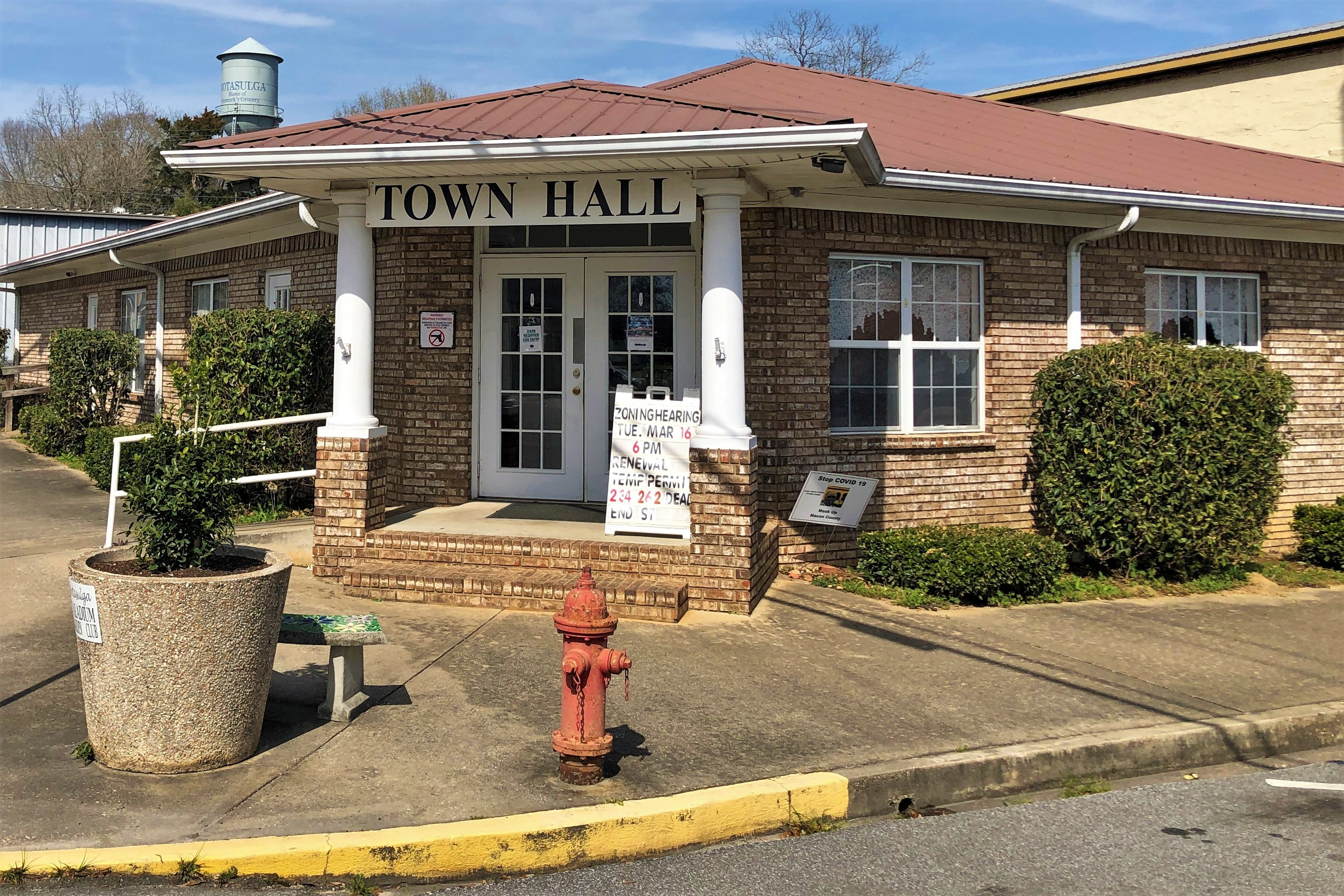
Notasulga Town Hall

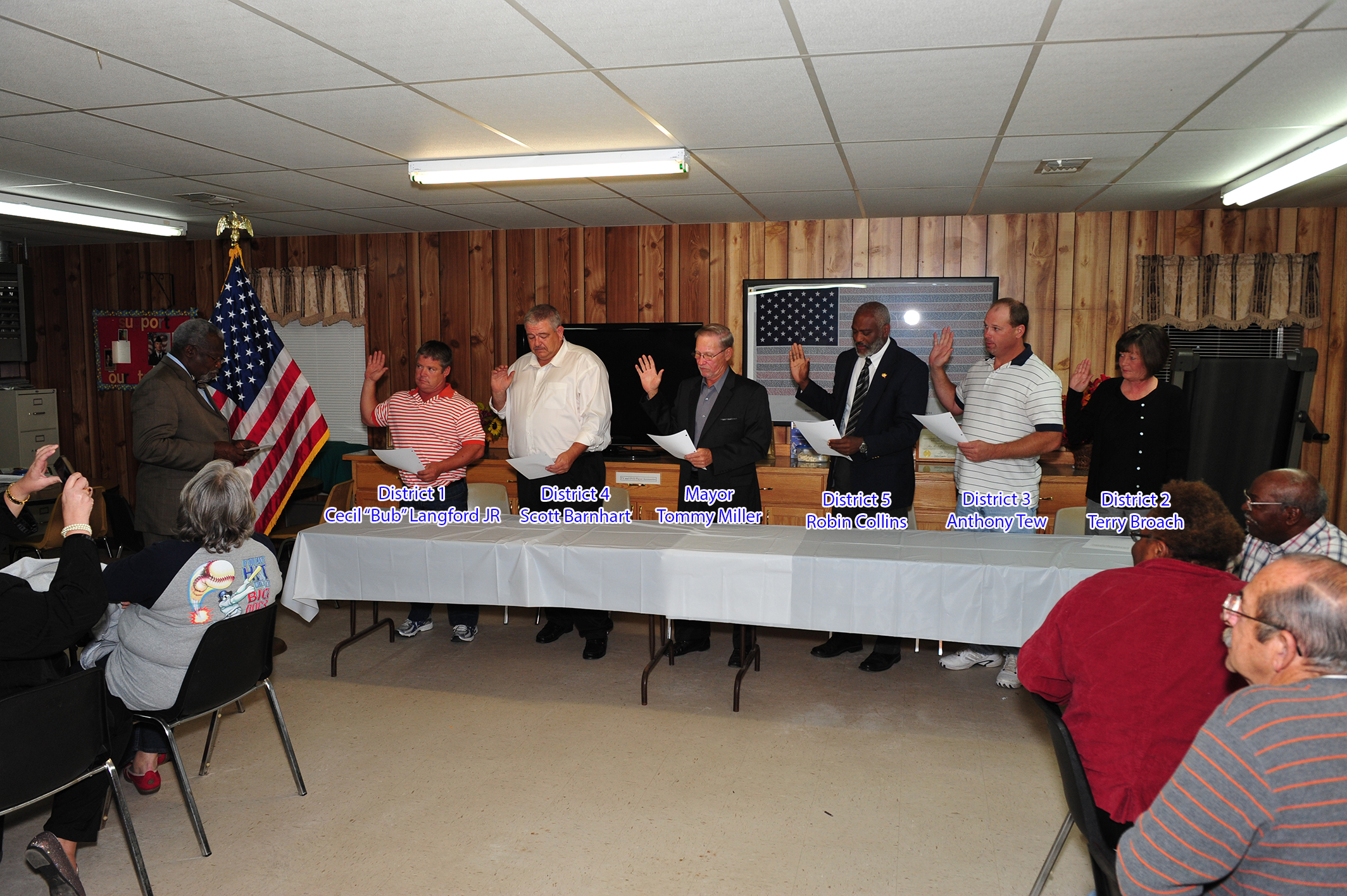
Notasulga City Council

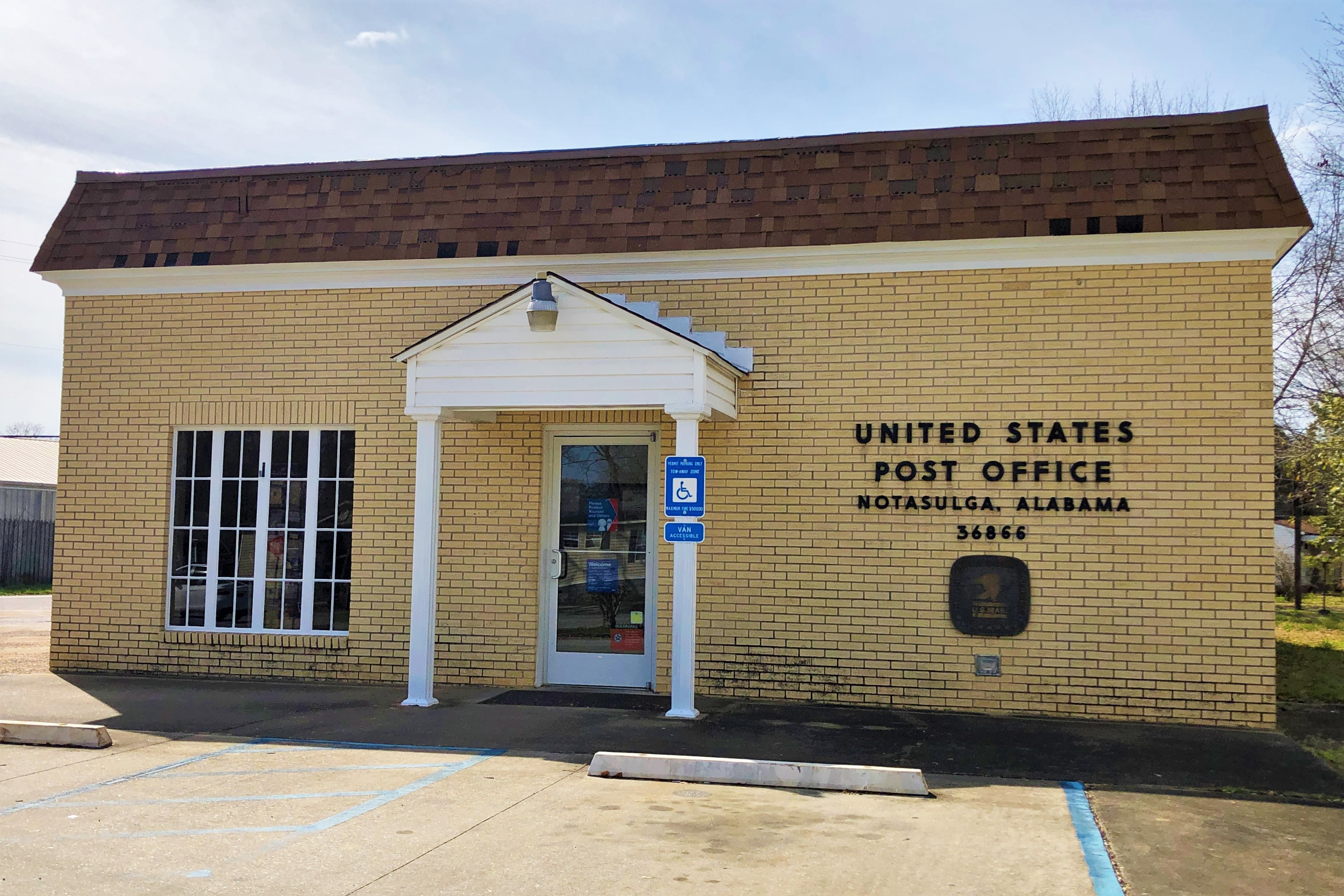
Notasulga Post Office (ZIP code: 36866)

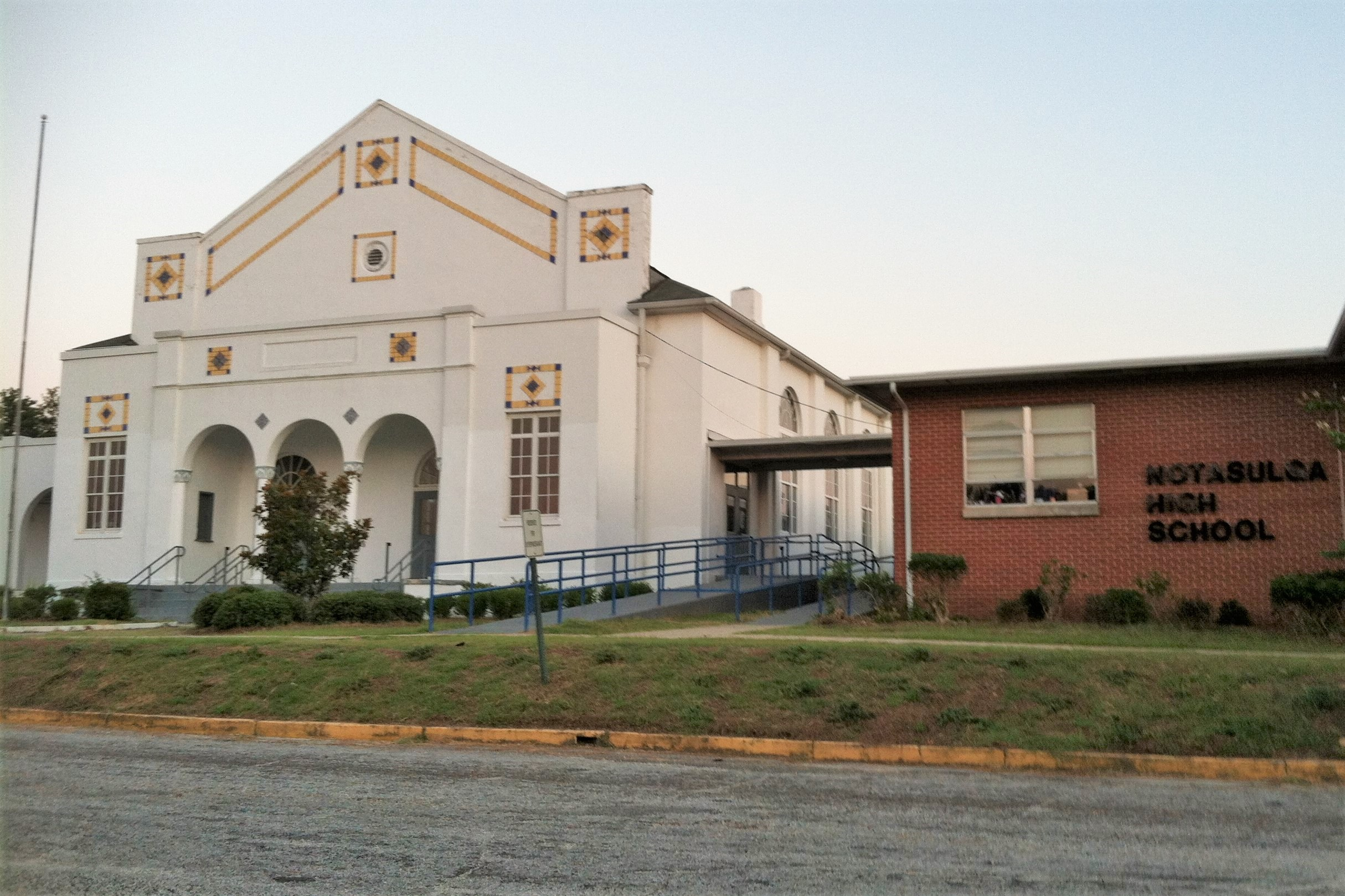
Notasulga High School. Listed on the National Register of Historic Places on November 16, 2020 as Macon County High School.

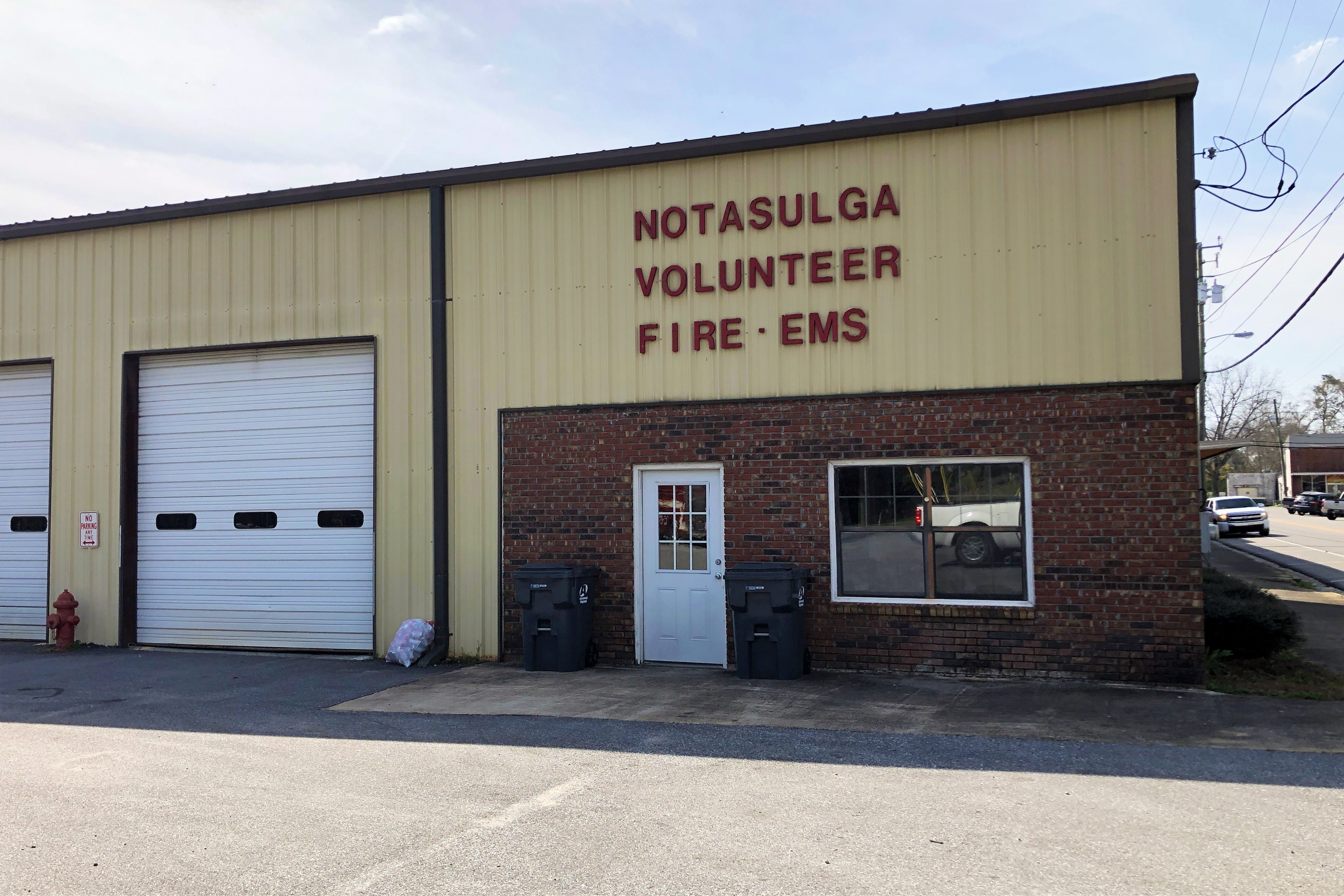
Notasulga Volunteer Fire Department

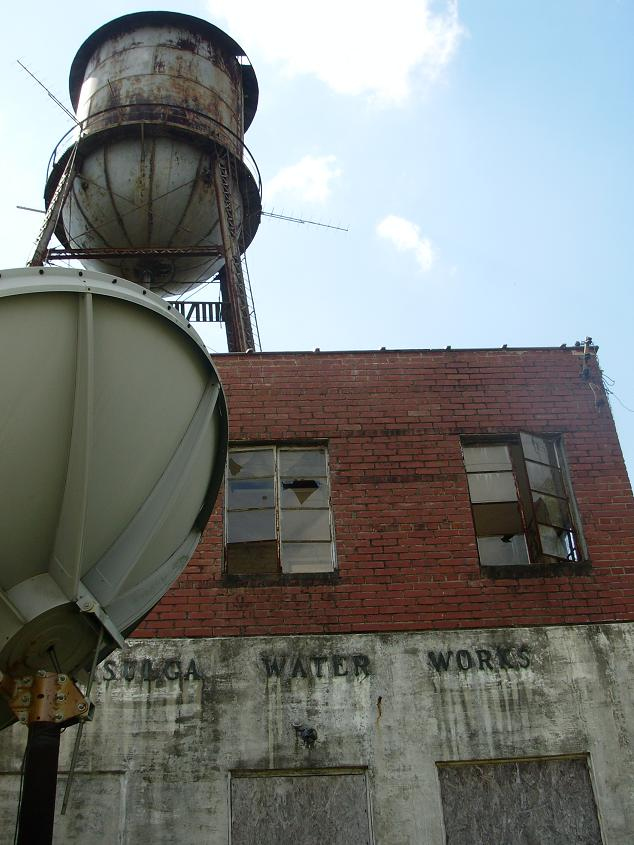
The Notasulga Water Works

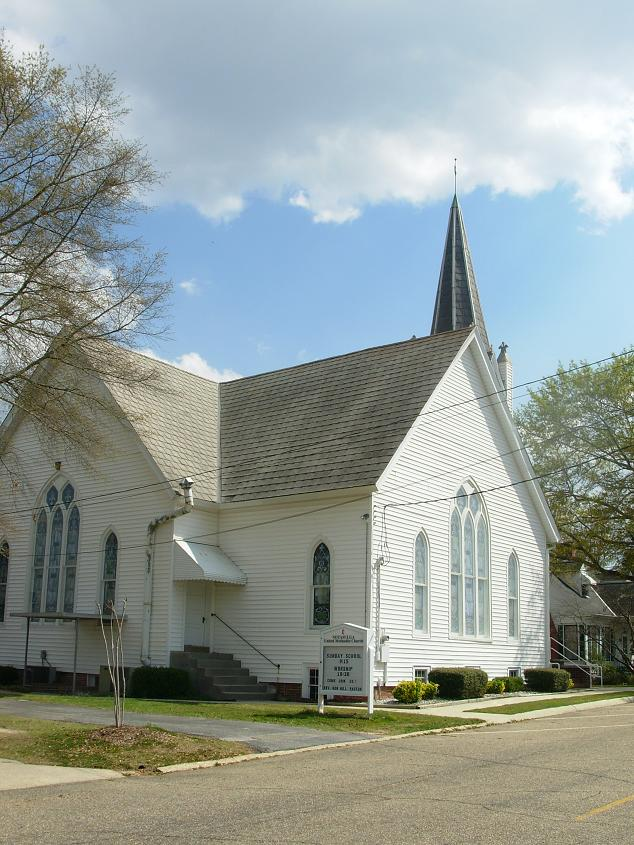
Notasulga United Methodist Church (Now closed)

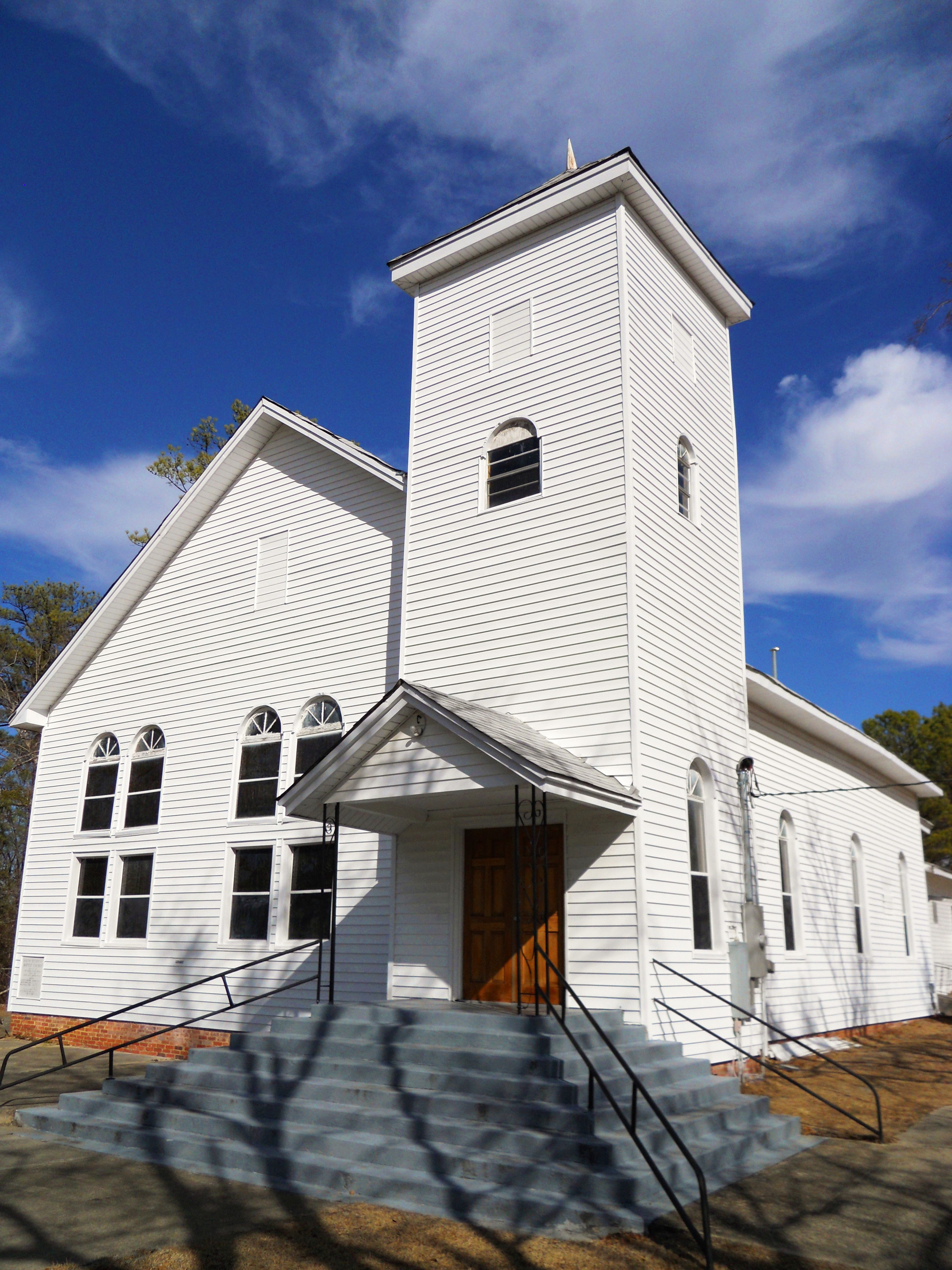
The Shiloh Missionary Baptist Church is located in Notasulga and was added to the National Register of Historic Places on August 6, 2010.

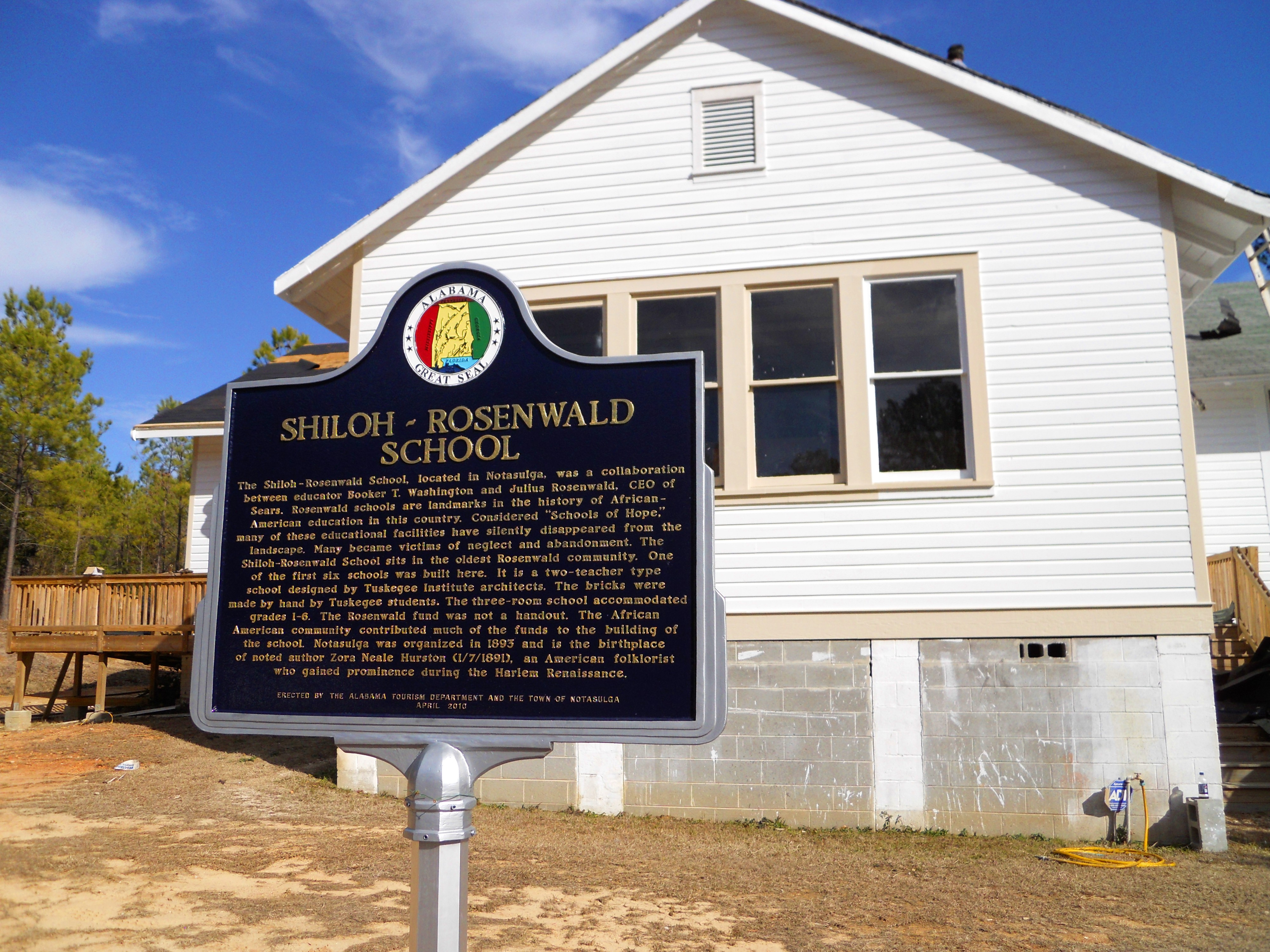
The Shiloh Rosenwald School is located in Notasulga and was added to the National Register of Historic Places on August 6, 2010.
