= Alexander Monteith =

Alexander Monteith may refer to:

- Alec Monteith (Alexander Lamont Monteith, 1886–1972), New Zealand politician
- Alexander C. Monteith (1902–1979), Canadian businessman
- Alexander Monteith (surgeon) (1660–1713), Edinburgh surgeon
