= Charles F. Wagner =

American electrical engineer

- Born: March 20, 1895; Pittsburgh, Pennsylvania, United States
- Died: January 4, 1970 (aged 74); Pittsburgh, Pennsylvania, United States
- Education: University of Chicago; Carnegie Institute of Technology
- Awards: IEEE Edison Medal (1951)
- Scientific career
- Fields: Electrical engineering

Charles F. Wagner (March 20, 1895 – January 4, 1970) was an American electrical engineer. He was an engineer at the Westinghouse Electric Corporation and received the IEEE Edison Medal for "distinguished contributions in the field of power system engineering".

Wagner received a B.S. from the Carnegie Institute of Technology in 1917 and did one year of graduate work at the University of Chicago.
