= John F. Peters =

American electrical engineer

- Peters and his klydonograph, pictured in Popular Science, August 1929
- Born: John Findley Peters; September 11, 1884 near Chambersburg, Pennsylvania, United States
- Died: October 31, 1969 (aged 85); Pittsburgh, Pennsylvania, United States
- Awards: IEEE Edison Medal (1953)

John Findley Peters (September 11, 1884 – October 31, 1969) was an American electrical engineer known for his invention of the Klydonograph. He began his career at Westinghouse Electric in 1904. He received the IEEE Edison Medal for "contributions to the fundamentals of transformer design, his invention of the Klydonograph, his contributions to Military Computers and for his sympathetic understanding in the training of young engineers". He was also awarded the Franklin Institute's Edward Longstreth Medal in 1929.
