= Klydonograph =

The Klydonograph is a device that records a surge in electrical voltage on a sulfur-dusted photographic film. The device is credited to John F. Peters, who developed it as a means of investigating the effects of lightning on electric power lines. The resulting graphic varies in size and shape depending on the potential, polarity, and wave shape of the captured lightning discharge.

The concept of imaging an electrical impulse with sulfur dust dates back to 1777, when it was documented by G. C. Lichtenberg. This idea was later refined by others, who incorporated a photographic plate before it was eventually adopted in the Klydonograph.

The Klydonograph is generally used to record impulse voltages between 2 kilovolt (kV) and 50 kV.
