= MacEachron =

MacEachron is a surname. Notable people with the surname include:

- J. Reginald MacEachron, American architect and musical composer
- Paul N. MacEachron (1889–1930), American college football and college basketball coach

== See also ==
- McEachron
