= Torchio =

Torchio is an Italian surname. Notable people with the surname include:

- Ethan Torchio (born 2000), Italian drummer
- J Torchio (born 1960), American football quarterback
- John Torchio (born 1999), American football player
- Matteo Torchio (born 1983), Italian bobsledder
- Philip Torchio (1868–1942), Italian electrical engineer

== See also ==
- Torchia, surname
