= Food Paradise season 8 =

Food Paradise
- Season 8
- No. of episodes: 6

Release
- Original network: Travel Channel
- Original release: June 19 – July 24, 2016

Season chronology
- ← Previous; Season 7 Next → Season 9

The eighth season of Food Paradise, an American food reality television series narrated by Jess Blaze Snider (formally Mason Pettit) on the Travel Channel, premiered on June 19, 2016. First-run episodes of the series aired in the United States on the Travel Channel on Mondays at 10:00 p.m. EDT. The season contained 6 episodes and concluded airing on July 24, 2016.

Food Paradise features the best places to find various cuisines at food locations across America. Each episode focuses on a certain type of restaurant, such as "Diners", "Bars", "Drive-Thrus" or "Breakfast" places that people go to find a certain food specialty.

== Episodes ==
=== Minnesota State Fair ===
Restaurant	Location	Specialty(s)
The Blue Barn @ Minnesota State Fair	Falcon Heights, Minnesota	"Cowboy Dave's Cluck & Moo" – chunks of chicken thighs and chuck roast mixed with diced vegetables, layered with veal demi-glace, and sautéed cabbage mixed with mashed potatoes, topped with pepper jack cheese sauce made with parsley, tarragon and cream, and a South Carolina-style barbeque sauce made with brown sugar, honey, mustard, salt and hot sauce, and sprinkled with crispy fried onions. "Meatloaf on a Stick" – a mixture of ground chuck beef, sautéed onions, pepper and garlic, eggs, flat-leaf parsley, salt, black pepper and oregano, hot sauce, and panko crumbs, baked and skewered on a stick and dipped in barbeque sauce. "Moatloaf Hash" – burnt-end meatloaf chunks, topped with baked then deep-fried fingerling potatoes, sautéed mirepoix (diced, carrots, celery and onions), scrambled eggs, and house-made Béarnaise sauce. "Chicken in a Waffle Cone" – malted milk chocolate ball at the bottom of the cone, topped with dee-fried chicken chunks and white gravy.
The Rabbit Hole (International Bazaar) @ Minnesota State Fair	Falcon Heights, Minnesota	"Kimchi 'N' Curry Poutine" – fries topped with sautéed kimchi and sweet onions in butter, curry gravy made from pork stock, shredded cheddar cheese, a poached egg, and green onions. "Hot Tail" – deep-fried pork tail, dipped with spicy sauce made from roasted scallions, ginger, garlic, and chili peppers.
Lulu's Public House @ Minnesota State Fair	Falcon Heights, Minnesota	"Lobster Corn Dog" – Canadian cold-water lobster claws, coated in a batter of flour, honey, buttermilk, cornmeal, creamed corn, deep-fried and served on a stick. "Macaroni Cheese Cupcakes" – Parmesan cheese and butter bread crust layered with homemade mac n’ cheese, topped with homemade cheddar queso sauce, and a dollop of cheddar cheese frosting on top.
Sweet Martha's Cookie Jar @ Minnesota State Fair	Falcon Heights, Minnesota	Chocolate Chip Cookies in a Bucket – petite homemade warm, soft and chewy chocolate chip cookies served in a paper cone of a plastic bucket. Served with All You Can Drink Milk Stand – non, whole, 2%, or chocolate milk from local dairy farmers.
Giggle's Campfire Grill (The North Woods) @ Minnesota State Fair	Falcon Heights, Minnesota	"Walleye Fish Cakes" – smoked walleye, smoked salmon mixed with roasted red peppers, mayonnaise, Old Bay seasoning, cayenne pepper, chives, dill lemon zest, locally sourced wild rice, lemon juice, and cream sherry, rolled in panko crumbs and deep-fried, served with a secret zesty ranch sauce. "Walleye Mac & Cheese" – local roasted sweet corn, roasted red pepper, curly cavatappi noodles, and smoked walleye, coated in creamy smoked Gouda sauce and sprinkled with panko crumbs.
Mancini's Al Fresco @ Minnesota State Fair	Falcon Heights, Minnesota	"Grilled Venetian Style Pizza" – grilled pizza dough (flour, salt, olive oil, local honey and yeast) topped with white sauce made from sweet cream butter, flour, shaved Parmesan, salt, pepper, and sweet cream, imported Molinari spicy salami, fresh oregano, crushed red pepper, and sliced parmigiano cheese. "Porketta Wings" – slow-roasted porkettta (Italian-style pork wings) seasoned with salt, pepper, garlic, onion, sweet basil, marjoram, toasted fennel, crushed red pepper, and trillium yeast (a natural tenderizer), coated in olive oil, and roasted low and slow for 4 hours. "Beer Gelato" – cream, milk, sugar mixed with Summit Oatmeal Stout from a St. Paul craft brewery and frozen to gelato.

=== Steak Stravaganza ===
Restaurant	Location	Specialty(s)
The Steak House @ Circus Circus	Las Vegas, Nevada	Prime Rib – two-pound Swiss-brand black angus prime rib (wet-aged for 21 days and dry-aged for 21 to 28 days), seasoned with olive oil, salt and pepper, and slow-roasted for six hours, served with mashed potatoes and asparagus. Porterhouse – dry-aged 24-ounce New York strip and fillet minion steak, seasoned with salt and cracked pepper and mesquite charcoal grilled, served with a baked potato and asparagus.
Old Place	Santa Monica Mountains, Cornell, California	Oak-Grilled Sirloin – 12-ounce black-angus top sirloin, seasoned with secret spices and grilled on an oak-wood open-flame grill, served with a baked potato and side salad. Elk Steaks – three grilled and seasoned elk rack of ribs served with grilled vegetables.
The Butcher Shop Beer Garden & Grill	Wynwood Art District, Miami, Florida	Steaks from the family-owned Chalire's Old Fashioned Butcher Shop. Bone-In Ribeye with Chimichurri – bone-in ribeye steak rubbed with extra-virgin olive oil and a brown sugar base (made with ground garlic, nutmeg, oregano, chopped bay leaves and lemon zest), grilled and topped with chimichurri (fresh chopped oregano and parsley, salt, pepper, red pepper flakes and chopped garlic, rice wine vinegar, olive oil and lemon juice).
The Fort	Morrison, Colorado	"Fine Food and Drink of the Early West". Buffalo Ribeye Steak – 12-ounce buffalo ribeye rubbed with salt, pepper, granulated garlic and raw sugar, grilled on an open-flame with cast-iron grates, served on an open skillet with homemade pork potatoes and green beans. "The Incorrect Steak" – house-made rubbed, grilled New York strip steak, topped with Dixon red chili sauce, shredded Vermont cheddar cheese and a sunny-side up fried egg.
The Prime Quarter Steak House	Green Bay, Wisconsin	Grill-Your-Own-Meat. T-bone Steak – tenderloin and sirloin, seasoned and char-grilled to your own likeness, served with a baked potato, Texas toast and greens from the salad bar. "Beefeater" – 2½ -pound steak (challenge: finish in 1 hour and 15 minutes).
Jess and Jim's Steakhouse	Kansas City, Missouri	"Playboy Strip" – sizzling 25-ounce K.C. Strip, (currently called Playboy Strip after Playboy magazine after the restaurant was written about in a 1972 article), seared on a flattop grill without seasoning and served on a hot plate with a signature giant baked potato topped with heavy cream, butter, and seasoning salt. Chicken-Fried Steak – a tenderized striploin battered in flour, seasoning salt and pepper, dipped in milk and egg, more batter, deep-fried, and served with homemade gravy.
Salt & Time Butcher Shop	Austin, Texas	Steaks from Texas T Ranch, breeds Japanese Kobe cows with black angus cows for American Wagyu, drenching the cows feed in microbrew. "Matambre" – tenderized matambre flank steak, poached in whey from ricotta cheese, layered with slices of mortadella (Italian baloney), house-made ricotta, dandelion greens, and a hard-boiled egg, rolled and tied with string, grilled, and topped with a sauce made from grilled green onions, garlic, carrots tops, cherry tomatoes, beef broth and chili sauce. "The Ropa" – or "the rope" of wagyu meat cut from the neck, cut into four long strips, braided and tied together, buttered basted in a hot cast-iron skillet, and served with a side of vegetables.
The Beefmaster Inn	Wilson, North Carolina	Ribeye – shipped in from a ranch outside Chicago, pick your own thickness from the raw ribeye roll at your table (starting at 8-ounces), seasoned with salt and garlic powder, grilled and served with a baked potato and garlic bread. Also if you ask, its prepared "Pittsburgh-style", blanketed in black pepper, seared to a crisp and rare on the inside.

=== Weiner Takes All ===
Restaurant	Location	Specialty(s)
Hoppin' Hots the Hot Dog Hut	Chicago, Illinois	"Modern Chicago Hot" – a new twist on the classic Chicago-style hot dog with its seven sacred ingredients; all-beef hot dog topped with tomato jam (made from sundried and fresh San Marzano tomatoes, minced white onions and garlic, tomato powder, brown sugar and lemon juice), jalapeño mustard, house-pickled celery, and a deep-fried pickle spear. "Pountin Hot" – hot dog topped with fries, Wisconsin deep-fried cheese curds (tempura battered), beef stock and veal demi-glace gravy, pickled red onions and parsley.
Frank Hot Dogs & Cold Beer	Austin, Texas	Purveyors of Artisan Sausage. "Jackalope Dog" – local antelope, rabbit and pork sausage (made with onion powder, smoked paprika, salt, pepper, celery seed and sugar) in a natural hog casting, topped with cranberry compote (made with orange juice, sugar, apple cider vinegar and lemon juice), shredded cheese, and house-made sriracha aioli. "Southern Belle" – blackened-spiced Polish sausage, split and topped with Cajun remoulade (made with chopped shallots, garlic and parsley, coarse ground black pepper, honey, crushed red pepper, hot sauce, mayo and mustard), pimento cheese (shredded cheddar, pickled cherry pepper, mayo and jalapeño peppers), fried green tomato slices, and green onion.
Po Dog Hot Dogs	Seattle, Washington	"Seattle Dog" – grilled all-beef hot dog topped with cream cheese and chopped green onions or scallions on a steamed brioche bun. "Wasabi Egg Roll Dog" – hot dog stuffed inside an egg roll wrapper, double deep-fried and topped with wasabi aioli (made with mayonnaise, cilantro, fresh garlic, and wasabi powder) on a bed of Asian slaw (red cabbage and green onions).
Crif Dog/PDT	Lower East Side, New York City, New York	Hot dog joint by day: "Lil Ma" – deep-fried bacon-wrapped hot dog topped with peanut butter, a pickle slice, and crushed potato chips. Secret speakeasy by night (entrance through a phone booth), called PDT (Please Don't Tell): "Wiley Dog" – created by famous chef and molecular gastronomist Wiley Dufresne, all-beef deep-fried hot dog topped with deep-fried mayonnaise sticks, tomato molasses, shredded iceberg lettuce and deep-fried onions.
Dat Dog	New Orleans, Louisiana	"The Greater Gator" – flattop grilled alligator sausage topped guacamole, shredded cheddar cheese, and chunky andouille sauce made with butter, white onions, diced pickled jalapeño peppers, chopped garlic, brown mustard, parsley, and wasabi powder and andouille (spiced with red pepper and garlic), garnished with tomatoes, raw onions, and yellow mustard on a big steamed and grilled bun. "Crawfish Etouffée Dog" – crawfish/pork sausage smothered in homemade etouffée (made with butter, diced onion, celery and green peppers, roux, secret spice mix, garlic, crawfish and chicken broth), sour cream, onions, tomatoes and Creole mustard.
Walter’s Hot Dog Stand	Mamaroneck, New York	Serving hot dogs since 1919, moved to current location in a pagoda building in 1928 that's an historical landmark. "Walter's Dogs" – All hot dogs are flattop grilled beef/pork/veal hot dog, split down the middle and basted in a secret butter-base sauce on a hot-buttered toasted bun, and topped with house-made mustard and relish.
Wurst Bar in the Square	Cincinnati, Ohio	Wurst Bar is the best bar, pun on a bun! "U-Betta Goetta" – char-grilled goetta sausage (beef and pork mixed with oats or oatmeal) topped with maple bacon gravy (made with butter, white onions, flour, chicken stock, heavy cream, maple syrup and bacon), hash browns and a poached egg, garnished with green onions. "Cuban 35" – char-grilled andouille sausage wrapped in ham and two slices of Swiss cheese, and topped with, mustard, mayo and slow-cooked pulled pork butt, and banana pepper relish made with house-made dill pickles and onions.
Martinsville Hot Dogs @ Martinsville Speedway	Martinsville, Virginia	"The Famous Martinville Speedway Hot Dog" – a 90-year-old tradition for only $2. A Jesse Jones brand "southern-style" red-colored hot dog with yellow mustard, bean-less beef chili, sweet barbecue slaw, and optional chopped white onions.

=== Deli-Licious ===
Restaurant	Location	Specialty(s)
Sarge's Deli	New York City, New York	"The Monster" – sliced house-cured corned beef, pastrami, roast beef, roast turkey breast, and Jewish beef salami, topped with lettuce, tomatoes, Russian dressing and house-made coleslaw on a loaf of black-seed Jewish rye bread. Matzo Ball Soup – made with jumbo matzo balls, chicken broth, egg noodles, vegetables and kreplach (beef brisket-stuffed dumplings, made with eggs, salt, black pepper, garlic powder, beef base and caramelized onions).
Cosmi's Deli	Philadelphia, Pennsylvania	"Cheesesteak Diavolo" – flat-grilled chopped loin tail beef mixed with slow-roasted Italian long hots (red & green chili peppers), five slices of pepperjack cheese on a long roll from local Sarcone's Bakery. "Chicken Soprano" – deep-fried chicken cutlets topped with sharp provolone, long hots, and roasted broccoli raab (cooked with garlic cloves, olive oil, salt & pepper) on a sesame seed roll.
Muss & Turner's	Atlanta, Georgia	"The Bucky Goldstein" – beef brisket in a salt, black pepper and toasted cumin spice rub, smoked, sliced, and sautéed in barbecue demi-glaze and topped with "tobacco-fried" onion rings (buttermilk-soaked tobacco-shaved onions, dredged in cornstarch, all-purpose flour, and a mix of salt, pepper, paprika, onion powder), Dijon mustard and pickles on a toasted challah egg bun. "Aporkalypse Now" – roasted pork (cured in brown sugar, salt, black peppercorn, thyme, garlic powder and a bay leaf), poached in duck fat, sliced and sautéed in butter, topped with Asian-style coleslaw, and cilantro mayo on a challah bun.
Kenny & Zuke's Delicatessen	Portland, Oregon	"Meshugaletta" – a double-decker sandwich with pastrami (brined for five days in water, kosher salt and pink salt, whole garlic cloves, white sugar, honey, coriander, peppercorns, bay leaves, juniper berries, all-spice, cinnamon and cloves), rubbed with spices, smoked and hand-sliced, layered with spicy olive lettuce, Russian dressing, sliced roast beef, turkey, kosher salami, on homemade rye bread. "Rueben Dog" – grilled all-beef hot dog topped with pastrami, sauerkraut, and melted Swiss cheese on a toasted bun.
Eovaldi's Deli	The Hill, St. Louis, Missouri	"The Daddy" – stuffed with homemade meatballs (ground pork seasoned with salt, pepper, cayenne, fennel seed, garlic powder, bread crumbs and eggs), sauced with marinara salsiccia (Italian sausage no-casing, consisting of ground pork and secret spices), topped with homemade meat sauce and local provel pizza cheese on Italian bread. "The Godfather" – top-round roast beef, dipped in au jus, topped with salsiccia links, and house-made "bomber gravy" (sautéed onions, mushrooms and roasted red peppers with garlic, and au jus), pepperjack cheese and salami on an Italian roll.
Ravage Deli	Baltimore, Maryland	"The Crabber’s Club" – crab cake (made with jumbo lump crabmeat, bread crumbs, mayo, Old Bay seasoning, lemon juice and chives), topped with Applewood-smoked bacon, provolone, shredded lettuce, tomato, house-pickled red onions and Old Bay aioli on a brioche bun. "The Ravage Challenge" – 3 ½-pound "Noble Pig Sandwich" (slow-roasted Heritage Berkshire pork shoulder, topped with house-made bacon, six slices of Vermont sharp cheddar and Italian provolone, smoked ham, sopressata, salami, shredded lettuce, tomatoes, and red pepper aioli on a loaf of butter-toasted Rustic Ciabatta bread) served with a bucket of hand-cut duck fat fries; must be eaten in 55 minutes.
Werner's Fine Sausages	Mission, Kansas	"Cheddar Bier Brat" – German bratwurst (made with ground pork shoulder, dehydrated beer buds, salt, chicken base, secret spices and slow-melting cheddar in natural casing), smoked for four hours, char-grilled and topped with sauerkraut and brown mustard on a sausage roll. Schnitzel – lean, hand-cut boneless pork chops, tenderized, coated in seasoned bread crumbs and deep-fried, topped with tomatoes and onions, served on rye bread.
Factor's Famous Deli	Los Angeles, California	"The Famous Rueben" – corned beef (pickled in water, and secret pickling spices), slow-boiled for three hours, hand-sliced and topped with double-cut melted Swiss cheese, and sauerkraut on seeded double-baked butter-grilled rye bread, served with a sour pickle spear and homemade Thousand Island dressing.

=== Hog Heaven ===
Restaurant	Location	Specialty(s)
Carnitas' Snack Shack	San Diego, California	"Triple Threat Pork Sandwich" – carnitas (pulled pork braised for four hours with orange juice, cola and secret seasonings and grilled on the flattop), pork schnitzel (breaded pork loin, coated with flour, egg wash and panko and deep-fried), and applewood smoked bacon, all topped with house made ‘shack aioli’ (made with pickled vegetables and homemade mayo) and a house-made pickled relish on a toasted brioche bun. "Carnitas Taco" – braised carnitas, topped with house-made guacamole (made with avocados, lime and salt) and pico de gallo (made with tomatoes, red onions, lime, serrano chili and cilantro) on a thick corn tortilla.
B's Barbecue	Greenville, North Carolina	"Chopped Barbecue Sandwich" – smoked whole hog slow-roasted with charcoal for hours without seasoning, shoulder is chopped by hand, and topped with homemade vinegar-based barbecue sauce (made with vinegar, crushed red peppers, and secret spices), and homemade coleslaw on a bun, served with 'corn sticks'. "Pork Ribs" – whole rack of pork ribs from the whole hog.
Bootleggers Modern American Smokehouse	Scottsdale, Arizona	"Triple B (a.k.a. Bacon Boot Bomb)" – bone-in pork shoulder rubbed with house-secret spices (paprika, black pepper, salt and dried oregano), smoked for 10 hours, pulled and layered on top of a lattice of bacon and ground spicy pork and brisket hash (made with smoked beef brisket, green & red bell peppers, white onions, and tomatoes), and shredded white cheese, all rolled together and smoked, served sliced on a cutting board. "PBLT Sliders" – flattop-grilled thick-cut pork belly, drizzled with soy sauce, and topped with house sauce (a mustard- and mayonnaise-based sauce), tomatoes, iceberg lettuce and red onions, on a sweet roll, speared with gherkins.
Lardo	Portland, Oregon	"Pork Meatball Banh Mi" – Vietnamese-style sandwich (banh mi) with pork meatballs (made with ground pork shoulder, salt, sugar, scallions, Thai fish sauce, sriracha, eggs, and panko breadcrumbs), rolled into balls, cut in half and grilled on the flattop, and topped with sriracha mayo, shredded carrots, pickled daikon radish and cilantro, on a ciabatta roll. "Pork Belly Gyro" – a Greek gyro with pork belly (seasoned with kosher salt, black pepper, rosemary, marjoram, oregano, garlic, and za'atar—a Lebanese spice mixture of dried thyme, sumac, sesame and salt), roasted in the oven, sliced, grilled on flattop and topped with tzatziki sauce (made with screened whole milk yogurt, sour cream, lemon juice, minced garlic, and fresh oregano), cucumber slices, tomatoes, feta cheese, shredded lettuce, and house-made lemon preserves on toasted pita bread.
Café Bavaria	Milwaukee, Wisconsin	"Schweinshaxe" – durhaxe or pork knuckle/shank (brined overnight in locally sourced apple cider peppercorn, bay leaves, salt and garlic), rubbed with paprika, roasted in duck fat, onions, celery, carrots, a bay leaf and pork stock, then shanks are deep-fried in duck fat and served with German-style coleslaw (shredded red cabbage, honey crisp apples, parsley, bacon, pepper, sugar and apple cider sautéed in a pan with canola oil), and potato pancakes (smashed red potatoes cooked in butter, with chopped white onions, garlic, salt and pepper), finished off with spicy apple cider glaze. "Schnitzel" – flattened and tenderized pork loin, coated in an egg and sour cream wash, battered in pretzel-crumbs, fried on the flattop and topped with mushroom sauce, served with grilled apples and spätzle or German pasta (eggs, oil, milk, mustard, nutmeg, and flour, boiled in water).
Dog Haus Biergarten	Pasadena, California	"Another Night in Bangkok" – red Thai curry wurst (sausage) (made with in-house grinded pork butt and pork jowl, fresh garlic, Thai chilies, fresh basil, cilantro, kaffir lime leaves, whole lime, salt, paprika, curry paste and galangal), smoked and grilled on a chargrill, topped with Thai coleslaw, peanut sauce and toasted peanuts, served on three butter-toasted King's Hawaiian sweet rolls. "The Pig Lebowski" – house-made smoked Polish pork kielbasa, grilled and topped with fries, coleslaw and barbecue sauce on a buttered-toasted sweet roll.
Pig Ate My Pizza	Robbinsdale, Minnesota, (just outside Minneapolis)	"Piggy Pie" – brioche crust pizza dough topped with a 10-inch pork sausage patty, pepperoni crumbles, (made from pork butt coarse-ground in natural casing), marinara sauce (made with San Marciano tomatoes), a four-cheese blend and sliced pepperoni, cooked in a special cast-iron pan coated with garlic oil, and also topped with cured pork belly slices and bacon aioli, garnished with fresh oregano, and parsley-infused garlic confit. "Cider Ham Rules" – brioche crust topped with a mushroom, onion and garlic puree, four-cheese blend, poached mushrooms, cooked in oven and topped with sliced Duroc ham (brined for six days in apple cider, molasses, kosher salt, sugar and pink curing salt) with a sweet cider glaze, apple sauce colored with beet juice called brunoise, and wavy potato chips.
Gaspar's Grotto	Tampa, Florida	Named after local and legendary pirate Jose Gaspar: "Gaspar's Cuban Sandwich" – pork shoulder, seasoned with salt & pepper, fresh garlic and oregano, marinated in mojo (mixture of fruit juices, vinegar, water, garlic and olive oil), and sour orange juice, slow-roasted in oven, sliced and stacked with Spanish glazed ham, salami, Swiss cheese, pickles, and yellow mustard on a pannini-press local buttered Cuban bread.

=== Wisconsin State Fair and the State Fair of Texas ===
Restaurant	Location	Specialty(s)
Vandalay Industries @ State Fair of Texas	Fair Park, Dallas, Texas	"Chicken-Fried Lobster Tail" – whole lobster tail brined in a mixture of salt, sugar, lemon juice and a secret blend of seasonings for five hours, double-dredged in egg and flour mix, deep-fried and topped with champagne gravy made with Champagne, garlic, lemon juice, chicken stock, flour, milk, butter and secret Cajun spices, served with fries and "Texas Caviar" or corn relish (corn, kidney beans, and pico de gallo).
Texas Skillet @ State Fair of Texas	Dallas, Texas	"Cowboy Nachos" – tortilla chips covered in queso sauce, and topped with chopped 12-hour smoked barbecue beef brisket, rubbed with salt, cracked black pepper, onion powder, garlic powder, smoked paprika, chili powder and brown sugar, more cheese, and pico de gallo (onion, tomato and jalapeño); "Cowboy Burrito" – grilled 10-inch flour tortilla stuffed with a scoop of their signature skillet-fried red potatoes, shaved sirloin steak, and cheddar jack cheese.
Long Star Roadhouse @ State Fair of Texas	Dallas, Texas	"Deep-Fried Thanksgiving Dinner" ("Thanksgiving Balls") – stuffing made with butter, diced celery and onions, mushrooms, ground pepper, chicken base, minced garlic, thyme, cornmeal, chopped roasted turkey and ground turkey, formed into balls, dipped in sweet cream corn and cornmeal, deep-fried, and served with a side of turkey gravy and cranberry sauce. "Lone Star Pork Handle" – jumbo pork chop marinated for 24 hours in a cinnamon chipotle rub, dredged in Lone Star Beer batter, breaded in basil-citrus panko crumbs, deep-fried and smothered in a bourbon-barbecue glaze (bourbon, brown sugar and garlic).
Brew City @ Wisconsin State Fair	Wisconsin State Fair Park, West Allis, Wisconsin	"Bacon Bottom Porker Pizza" – woven-bacon lattice crust, topped with roasted pork butt seasoned with Mexican spice achiote, "beer-b-que" sauce made with Water Street Brewery Octoberfest beer and a sixteen spice blend, local mozzarella and gouda cheeses, and chopped red onions, garnished with cilantro, and chicharron (pork rinds).
Water Street Brewery @ Wisconsin State Fair	West Allis, Wisconsin	"Wis-Cone-Sin" – rotkohl (German red cabbage dish of red onions and red cabbage cooked in bacon fat, add apple slices, salt, pepper, and brown sugar), sautéed chicken schnitzel (breaded chicken cutlets) made with seasoned breadcrumbs, salt, pepper, garlic powder, and parsley, and a deep-fried potato pancake, served in a special pretzel cone, topped off with crispy cinnamon apple straws and drizzled with sweet beer-laced sauce.
Saz's Bavarian Haus @ Wisconsin State Fair	West Allis, Wisconsin	"Schweinefleisch Frites" ("Pork Fries") – cherrywood-smoked pork belly, cut into thin strips, soaked in buttermilk and dredged into flour seasoned with tarragon, thyme, salt and pepper, and deep-fried, served with a side of signature beer mustard dipping sauce. "Bacon-Wrapped Bacon" – cherrywood smoked pork belly chunks, wrapped with bacon, skewered on a stick, deep-fried and glazed with a syrup-barbecue sauce made with local maple syrup and Saz's barbecue sauce.
Tropics at the Fair @ Wisconsin State Fair	West Allis, Wisconsin	"Beer-Battered Pretzel-Coated Deep-Fried Cheese Curds" – cheese curds battered with flour seasoned with salt, milk, eggs and beer, tossed into crushed pretzel coating, and deep-fried, served a dipping sauce of jerk seasoning and ranch dressing.
Siggy's Wild Dogs Saloon @ Wisconsin State Fair	West Allis, Wisconsin	"The Tijuana Bacon Dog" – all-beef hotdog wrapped in bacon on a stick, deep-fried and drizzled with barbecue sauce, served on a toasted bun. "Deep-Fried Pickle Dog" – boiled foot-long hot dog topped with deep-fried dill pickles and drizzled with ranch dressing.
Original Cream Puff Pavilion @ Wisconsin State Fair	West Allis, Wisconsin	"World Famous Cream Puffs" – jumbo-sized cream puffs filled with a mound of whipped cream and dusting with powdered sugar.
Slim McGinn's Irish Pub @ Wisconsin State Fair	West Allis, Wisconsin	"The Fat Elvis Sundae" – jumbo peanut butter cup on a stick, dipped in banana batter (made with ripe bananas, flour, baking powder, brown sugar, cinnamon, vanilla, salt, water and whole milk), deep-fried, and served with a scoop of peanut butter ice cream and a scoop of banana ice cream, topped with whipped cream, chocolate sauce, crumbled peanut butter cups and salty bacon.
