= Shiloh Missionary Baptist Church and Rosenwald School =

Church and school in Notasulga, Alabama, US

- U.S. National Register of Historic Places
- Alabama Register of Landmarks and Heritage
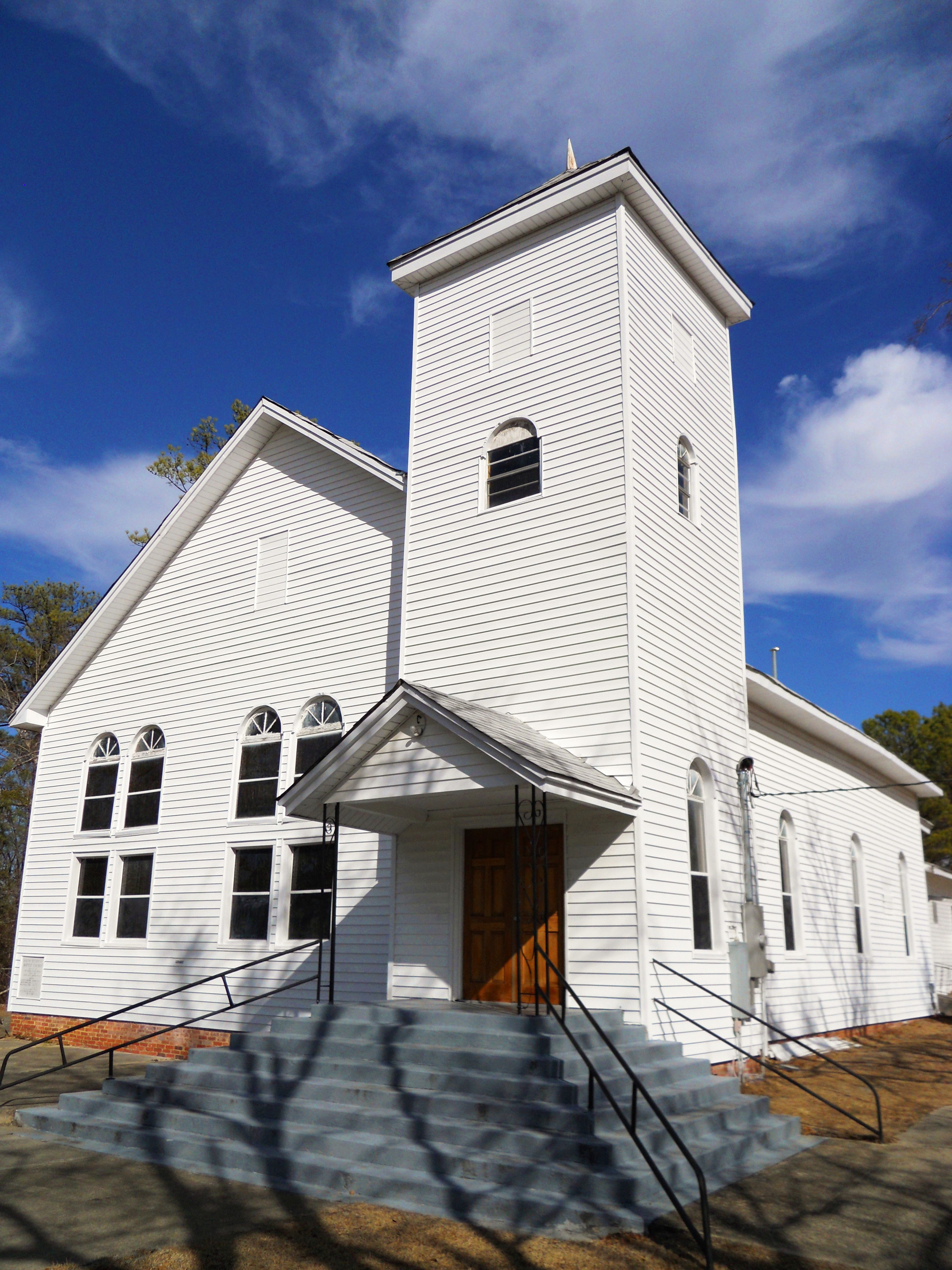
- Shiloh Missionary Baptist Church in 2011

- Location within Alabama
- Nearest city: Notasulga, Alabama, U.S.
- Coordinates: 32°31′41″N 85°40′40″W
- Area: 1.2 acres (0.49 ha)
- Built: 1919
- Architect: Samuel L. Smith
- MPS: The U.S. Public Health Service Syphilis Study, Macon County, Alabama 1932-1975 MPS
- NRHP reference No.: 10000522

Significant dates
- Added to NRHP: August 6, 2010
- Designated ARLH: September 20, 2006

The Shiloh Missionary Baptist Church and Rosenwald School is a historic Missionary Baptist Church and former Rosenwald School for African American students, located near 7794 Alabama State Route 81, Notasulga, Alabama in Macon County, Alabama. The property contains two buildings that are both associated with the Tuskegee Syphilis Study.

The buildings and adjacent cemetery were added to the Alabama Register of Landmarks and Heritage on September 20, 2006. They were subsequently added to the National Register of Historic Places on August 6, 2010.

== History ==
The church building was built in 1919 and is a gable-front frame building with a frame bell tower serving as a prominent landmark along the highway. The building has been sided in vinyl, c. 1990, but the interior of the building retains its c. 1916 appearance, complete with decorative painted graining on doors, pews, wainscoting, and other defining features of the building.

The Rosenwald School, built c. 1922 and remodeled c. 1936, was a school partially funded by the Rosenwald Fund for African American students during a time of segregation. The school building retains its historical and architectural integrity from the 1930s when a New Deal agency expanded the industrial room and made other interior and exterior changes. The Rosenwald School underwent renovation as of February 2011.

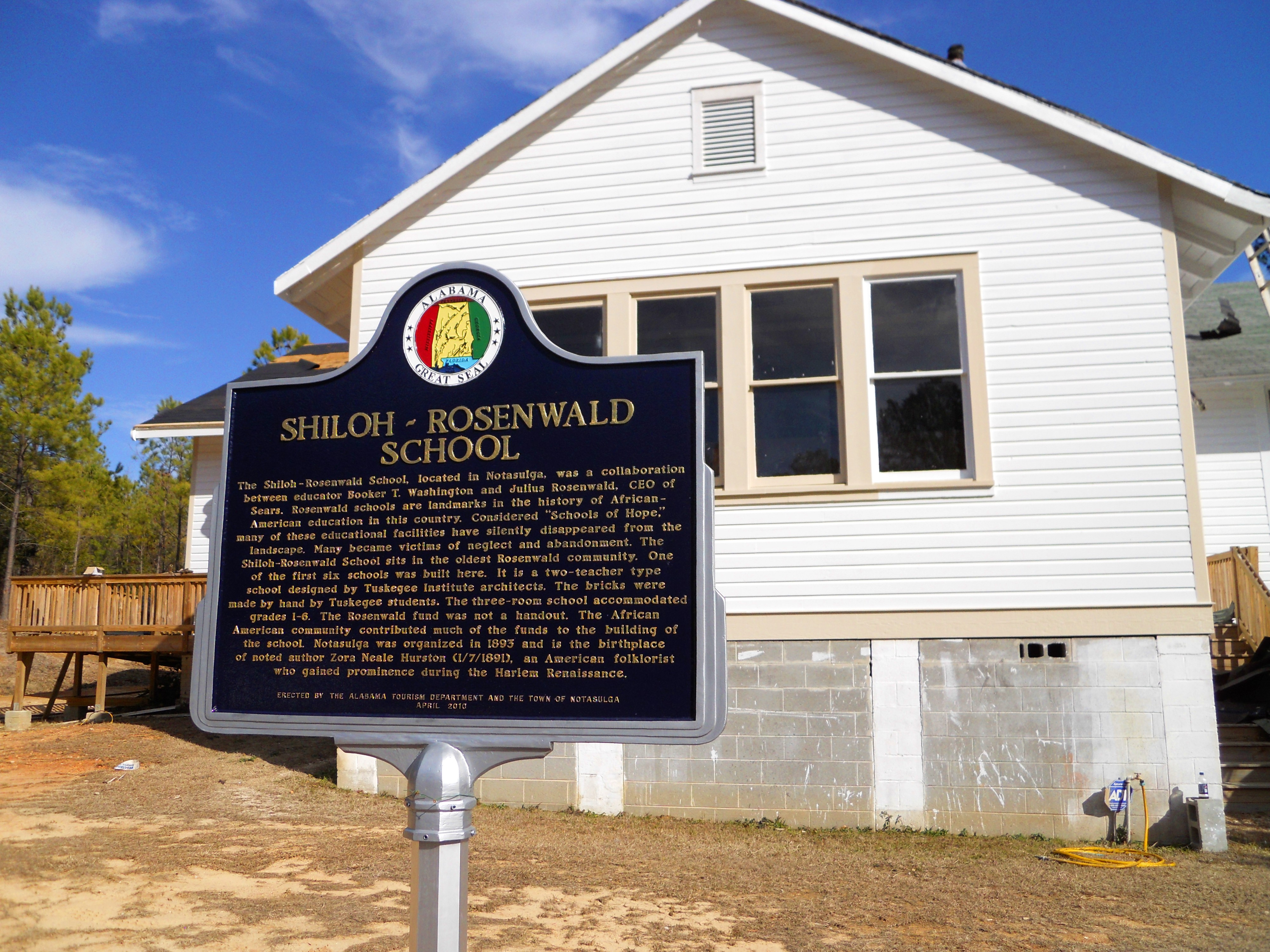
The Shiloh school is the only Rosenwald School that remains in Macon County.

One of the most infamous incidents in the medical history of the United States is the study of syphilis, sponsored by the U. S. Public Health Service (USPHS) in Macon County, Alabama, from 1932 to 1973. It is often called "The Tuskegee Study" because the Macon County seat is Tuskegee and a former hospital at Tuskegee Institute (now university) and the Veterans’ Hospital at Tuskegee were used for some of the medical procedures. The Shiloh Missionary Baptist Church is located about 8 miles north of Tuskegee, Alabama.

Notices would be sent to subject of the Tuskegee Syphilis Study. They were instructed to meet at a central location to be picked up for testing. A memo from the USPHS details where these roundups between test doctors and USPHS official took place. The memo stated "The Government will be here next week. Be sure to meet him at the time a place listed below that is nearest your home." The rural location were a combination of churches, schools, and crossroads stores. The Shiloah Missionary Baptist Church was one gathering location.

== Notes ==
- Public Health Service to Dear Sir, October 18, 1955, CDC Papers, Tuskegee Syphilis Study Administrative Records, 1930–80, Box 16, Folder Alabama-Misc., National Archives, Southeast Region.
- James J. Jones, Bad Blood: The Tuskegee Syphilis Experiment (New York: Basic Books, 1993).
- Reberby, Tuskegee Truths
- The National Archives: https://www.archives.gov/research/arc/index.html All of the digitized materials can be pulled up using search term "Tuskegee Syphilis Study". Individual items of interest can be pulled up by ID number: 956091, 956107, 824600, 956126, 956102, 824607
