= Cummings C. Chesney =

American electrical engineer

- Born: October 28, 1863; Selinsgrove, Pennsylvania
- Died: November 27, 1947 (aged 84)
- Awards: IEEE Edison Medal (1921)
- Scientific career
- Fields: Electrical engineering

Cummings C. Chesney (Selinsgrove, Pennsylvania, October 28, 1863 – November 27, 1947) was an electrical engineer who made major contributions to alternating current power systems.
