= Torchia =

Torchia is an Italian surname. Notable people with the surname include:

- Dennis Torchia, American biophysicist
- Ellora Torchia, (born 1992), British actress
- Joseph Torchia (1948–1996), American author, photographer and reporter
- Mike Torchia (born 1972), American ice hockey player
- Tony Torchia (1943–2021), American baseball player

== See also ==
- Torchio, surname
