= James Ross MacDonald =

American physicist (1923–2024)

James Ross Macdonald
- Born: February 27, 1923; Savannah, Georgia, U.S.
- Died: March 30, 2024 (aged 101)
- Awards: IEEE Edison Medal (1988)

James Ross Macdonald (February 27, 1923 – March 30, 2024) was an American physicist who was instrumental in building up the Central Research laboratories of Texas Instruments (TI).

== Early life ==
MacDonald was born in Savannah, Georgia, in 1923 to John Elwood Macdonald and Antonina Jones Hansell. He graduated from St. Andrew's School, Middletown, Delaware, in 1940 and then attended Williams College in Williamstown, Massachusetts, on a four-year Tyng Scholarship. At the beginning of 1943, he transferred to the Massachusetts Institute of Technology in Cambridge, Massachusetts, where, in a special wartime program, he was awarded an SB in Electrical Engineering from MIT in February 1944 and a BA in Physics in June of that year from Williams.

He joined the U.S. Navy in 1944, trained as a radio-radar officer and was preparing to go with a night-fighter air squadron to the Pacific war theater when the war there ended in 1945. Marrying Margaret Milward Taylor in 1946after leaving the Navy, he returned to MIT, where he worked on Project Whirlwind, an early vacuum-tube, room-size computer. He received the SM degree in Electrical Engineering in 1947 from MIT.

In 1947, he was awarded a Rhodes scholarship from Massachusetts to attend New College, Oxford University. He and his wife were in Oxford from 1948-1950, and he received a D.Phil. degree from Oxford in condensed-matter physics in 1950 (and a D.Sc. degree in 1967 for published research done since graduation).

== Career ==
After carrying out physics research at Armour Research Foundation and Argonne National Laboratory in Chicago from 1950 to 1953, he joined Texas Instruments in Dallas, Texas, near the beginning of its very successful silicon transistor development program. He subsequently became the Director of the Physics Research Laboratory, the Central Research Laboratories, and finally Vice President for Research and Engineering in 1968. Upon taking early retirement from Texas Instruments in 1974, he joined the Department of Physics and Astronomy of the University of North Carolina at Chapel Hill as the William R. Kenan Jr. Professor of Physics. He took emeritus status there in 1989.

He was elected to the National Academy of Engineering in 1970 and to the National Academy of Sciences in 1973, one of only fifty members of both academies at that time. Both as a member of the National Academy of Sciences and of the National Academy of Engineering he served on many government advisory committees and university visiting committees and was a member of the NAS Commission on Physical Sciences, Mathematics, and Resources.

He was also a Fellow of the American Physical Society, the Institute of Electrical and Electronics Engineers (IEEE), and the American Association for the Advancement of Science, and a member of Phi Beta Kappa, Sigma Xi, Tau Beta Pi, the Electrochemical Society, and the Audio Engineering Society. In 1986 he received the George E. Pake Prize of the American Physical Society, an award for combining original research accomplishments with leadership in the management of research in industry. In 1988, he was awarded the IEEE Edison Gold Medal "for seminal contributions to solid state science and technology, and outstanding leadership as a research director."

== Research and Academia ==
His research career led to 10 patents and over 260 papers published in refereed scientific journals. He was the first to publish in 1953 a model of the Poisson-Nernst-Planck electrical response. Its further development and eventual incorporation as a program in LEVMW has made it a widely applicable data fitting and interpretation model. During his years at UNC, in addition to his teaching and research activities, he and his associates developed LEVM, a computer-oriented immittance- spectroscopy data analysis program which he continued to improve and keep up to date after his retirement. It has been freely available since 1992, and its current version, LEVMW, is used around the world by thousands of scientists, engineers, and students in many fields.

His published work, as well as a pioneering 1987 book on Impedance Spectroscopy (currently in its third edition) that he edited and to which he was a major contributor, and his continuing help to students and colleagues around the world in using LEVM/LEVMW for impedance spectroscopy data analysis, resulted in international recognition for his experimental and theoretical contributions to condensed matter physics, electrochemistry, and data analysis.

== Personal life ==
After 67 years of marriage, his wife, Margaret Macdonald, predeceased him in 2013. In 2016, he married Dr. Marlene Appley, a fellow resident of Carolina Meadows. She predeceased him in 2023. He is survived by a daughter, Dr. Nina Macdonald, of Silverado, California and her husband, Dr. Charles E. Wright, and by two sons: Dr. James Ross Macdonald IV, Esq., of Highland Park, New Jersey, and William Taylor Macdonald and his wife Lucinda Dalton Macdonald of Atlanta, Georgia, two stepchildren, Elizabeth and Noah Appley, as well as nine grandchildren, and four great grandchildren.

== Death ==
MacDonald died at the Carolina Meadows retirement community in Chapel Hill, North Carolina, in 2024. He was 101.
