= Herman P. Schwan =

Biomedical engineer and biophysicist (1915–2005)

- Born: 7 August 1915; Aachen, Germany
- Died: 17 March 2005 (aged 89); Radnor, Pennsylvania, United States
- Citizenship: Germany
- Education: University of Frankfurt
- Awards: IEEE Edison Medal (1983) d'Arsonval Award
- Scientific career
- Fields: Bioengineering; Biophysics
- Workplaces: Max Planck Institute for Biophysics; University of Frankfurt; US Naval Base Aeromedical Equipment Laboratory; University of Pennsylvania
- Doctoral advisor: Boris Rajewsky

Herman P. Schwan (7 August 1915 – 17 March 2005) was a biomedical engineer and biophysicist, recognized as the "founding father of biomedical engineering." He was born in Aachen, Germany, and died in his home Radnor, Pennsylvania.

== Biography ==
Schwan was born from a science-influenced family. His father Wilhelm Schwan was a science and mathematics teacher, and mother Meta was a physics teacher. He invariably excelled in physics and mathematics and graduated from gymnasium (German high school) at Göttingen in distinction in 1934. He continued to study mathematics, physics, and engineering in Göttingen, and then biophysics in Frankfurt. He received PhD degrees in physics and biophysics in 1940 and 1946 from the University of Frankfurt-am-Main. He was with the Max Planck Institute of Biophysics in Frankfurt from 1937 to 1947. In 1947 he emigrated to America, where he joined the University of Pennsylvania's School of Medicine.

== Professional Achievements ==
During his career Schwan did much to improve the emerging field of biomedical engineering, developed its first PhD program, and produced more than 300 technical papers and gave countless lectures. He is best known for many biophysical studies related to electrical properties of cells and tissues, and on non-thermal mechanisms of interaction of fields with biological systems. His innovative works include the large low-frequency dielectric dispersion that is found in biological material, and electrically induced forces on cells. He was the pioneer in recognizing the possible health hazards of non-ionizing electromagnetic fields. He proposed a safe limit for human exposure to microwave energy of 100 W/m2 (based on thermal analysis) to the U.S. Navy in 1953, which became the basis for the present IEEE C95.1 safety standards used in the western world.

== Awards and honors ==
Schwan received the 1962 Philadelphia Section Achievement Award of the Institute of Radio Engineers, the 1967 W. J. Morlock Award of the IEEE, the 1974 Boris Rajewsky Prize for Biophysics, the 1980 U.S. Senior Scientist Award of the Alexander von Humboldt Foundation.

He was a Fellow of the IEEE and the AAAS. He received the 1983 IEEE Edison Medal, and is a member of the National Academy of Engineering, and a Foreign Scientific Member of the Max Planck Society.

In 1985 he was awarded the first d'Arsonval Award of the Bioelectromagnetics Society.

The Herman P. Schwan prize of the International Conference on Electrical Bioimpedance (ICEBE) and the International Society for Electrical Bioimpedance (ISEBI) was initiated in 2001 in his honour and is awarded once every three years. The Herman P. Schwan Award has been presented to: dr. Ron Pethig (United Kingdom, 2001); dr. Brian Brown (United Kingdom, 2004); dr. Eberhardt Gersing (Germany, 2007); dr. Sverre Grimnes (Norway, 2010); dr. David Holder (United Kingdom, 2013); dr. Jan H. Meijer (the Netherlands, 2016).
