= Edward E. Hammer =

- Born: December 27, 1931; Brooklyn, New York, U.S.
- Died: July 16, 2012 (aged 80)
- Awards: IEEE Edison Medal (2002)

Edward E. Hammer (December 27, 1931 – July 16, 2012) was an engineer who was at the forefront of fluorescent lighting research. His technological contributions in incandescent, fluorescent and HID light sources earned him over 35 patents.

He received his bachelor's degree from Manhattan College in 1954.

During the energy crisis of the 1970s, he led the development of General Electric’s pioneering energy-efficient lamp. He led the development of the Watt Miser (marketed as the F-40 Watt Miser), which was released in 1973. In 1976, he invented the first compact fluorescent lightbulb, but due to the difficulty of the manufacturing process for coating the interior of the spiral glass tube, GE did not manufacture or sell the device. Other companies began manufacturing and selling the device in 1995. The Smithsonian Institution houses Hammer's original CFL prototype.

Hammer is an IEEE Fellow and the 2002 IEEE Edison Medal winner.
