= Philip Sporn =

Austrian-American corporate executive (1896–1978)

- Born: November 25, 1896; Folotwin, Austria
- Died: January 23, 1978 (aged 81); New York City, New York, U.S.
- Education: Columbia University
- Awards: IEEE Edison Medal (1945); John Fritz Medal (1956); ASME Medal (1962); Wilhelm Exner Medal (1963); Faraday Medal (1969)
- Scientific career
- Fields: Electrical engineering

Philip Sporn (November 25, 1896 – January 23, 1978) was an Austrian electrical engineer known for his work as the president and chief executive officer of the American Gas and Electric Company. He received the IEEE Edison Medal for "contributions to the art of economical and dependable power generation and transmission".

== Education ==
Sporn received his E.E. degree from Columbia University in 1917.

== Career ==
He worked for Consumers Power Company in Michigan before joining American Electric Power, rising through the ranks to become Chief Electric Engineer, and then President in 1947. He retired in 1961, but remained a director until 1968. 1962 he became member of the National Academy of Sciences.

During his tenure are Chief Engineer, then President, the company achieved a number of innovations, including large-sized generating units, supercritical-pressure boilers, natural-draft cooling towers, tall stacks, and extra-high-voltage transmission and lightning protection.

He was named by Harvard Business School as one of the "Great American Business Leaders of the 20th Century."

== Death ==
Sporn died of an unexpected heart attack on January 23, 1978.
