= John K. Hodnette =

American electrical engineer

- Born: John Koga Hodnette; March 23, 1902; Notasulga, Alabama, U.S.
- Died: June 13, 1966 (aged 64) near Auburn, Alabama, U.S.
- Awards: IEEE Edison Medal (1957)

John Koga Hodnette (March 23, 1902 – June 13, 1966) was an American electrical engineer at the Westinghouse Electric Corporation. He received the IEEE Edison Medal for "significant contributions to the electrical industry through creative design and development of transformer apparatus which marked new advances in protection, performance and service. For his vision, judgement and management skill which fostered and achieved the practical application of his ideas with resulting advancements in the electrical industry".

Hodnette along with his sister, Mary, was killed in a car crash in 1966.
