= Charles F. Avila =

American electrical engineer

- Born: September 17, 1906; Taunton, Massachusetts, U.S.
- Died: October 29, 2000 (aged 94); Westwood, Massachusetts, U.S.
- Awards: IEEE Edison Medal (1968)

Charles Francis Avila (September 17, 1906 – October 29, 2000) was an American electrical engineer and a Vice President and a member of the Executive Committee of the Yankee Atomic Electric Company.

== Biography ==
Charles Francis Avila was born in Taunton, Massachusetts, on September 17, 1906. His facility for resolving seemingly insoluble problems and his vigorous leadership have contributed much to the electrical power industry. There is much in the tradition of Thomas A. Edison in the way he has worked, for Avila has the same far-reaching curiosity, the same unflagging interest in basic principles and the same unremitting perseverance. His early penchant for an engineering career became evident during his pre-high school days through his interest in the care, rebuilding, and refinishing of bicycles. He was recognized as a leader by and was a consultant to his boyhood friends in the numerous areas of model building and mechanical and electrical gadgetry.

In high school, Avila was most interested in the science courses and became an enthusiastic builder of amateur radio equipment. His limited budget made him constantly aware of the economic aspects of his projects. This combination of technological interest and economics led him to enter an integrated five-year program in Electrical Engineering and Business Administration at Harvard University from which Avila graduated in 1929 with a bachelor's degree.

Immediately after graduation, Avila entered the employ of the Boston Edison Company. During these years, he took the initiative in analyzing and solving the many problems inherent in the operation of the utility system. His contributions included a method of laying a half-mile length of cable across a lake without a barge to carry the reel; the development of a formula for safe pulling tensions to permit extra long cables between manholes; the design of a metal bellows as a flexible insert in sheaths to allow cable motion; the invention of a thermometer probe to measure accurately the temperature of cable conductors in ducts; the improvement of cable reliability by investigating the complex causes of faults under varying conditions. From this work he derived formulas whereby the combined cost of testing and the cost of outages were made a minimum.

Avila designed tanks for transformers applying a zinc spray of bituminous coating to prevent their deterioration when salt water was present. He devised slots in unfastened manhole covers to prevent them from flying up. He was a pioneer in the use of neoprene-jacketed cables to eliminate stray currents and corrosion by electrolysis. He engineered the installation of the first high voltage aluminum conductor cable in this country. As Vice President and a member of the Executive Committee of the Yankee Atomic Electric Company and as a Director of the Connecticut Yankee Atomic Power Company, he has done much to develop atomic power in New England.

Avila's method of dealing with cable failures led to his leading authority on cable design and operation. When a failure occurred, he was soon at the scene tracing the cause and minutely dissecting the faulty section to determine the source of failure. From these analyses, with the assistance of the engineers of cable companies, notable improvements in cable manufacture were developed.

Avila's interests were not confined to electrical engineering. While at Harvard, he read Ritchey's treatise on optics and telescopes and before long began grinding and mounting optical lenses which in turn led to the construction of a 6-inch telescope of excellent precision in definition and mounting. His enthusiasm influenced others and resulted in the formation of The Amateur Telescope Makers of Boston (ATMOB), a club which continues today. This club, with the assistance of Avila's expertise in optics and with the collaboration of James G. Baker of the Harvard Optical Research Laboratory and Harlow Shapley, worked on the design of an aerial camera for the National Defense Research Committee. Avila did the entire engineering work on the camera with automatic focusing for altitudes up to flying limits and self-adjustments for ground speed and distance, air density, temperature and plane rocking. This camera was used extensively in the Pacific and Korean Wars and is still in use today for tracking missiles and satellites.

Avila advanced through a series of positions with the Boston Edison Company until in 1960 he became President and General Manager and, in 1967, Chairman of the Board and Chief Executive Officer.

Avila was most interested in public affairs and contributes generously of his time. He played a large part in the conception and shaping of the New Boston and was a director of many civic and business organizations including the Greater Boston Chamber of Commerce, the John Hancock and Liberty Mutual Insurance Companies, the National Shawmut Bank of Boston, the Raytheon Company, and the New England Council.

Avila has also made considerable contributions to the field of education. As a member of the Executive Committee of the Society of Harvard Engineers and Scientists, he maintained close contact with the educational program of his Alma Mater; he was a member of the IEEE Committee on Relations with Educational Institutions. As a member of the Corporation and a Trustee of Northeastern University, he was instrumental in establishing the Power System Engineering Program, a five-year course sponsored by local utilities, designed to stimulate the interests of electrical engineering students in power engineering.

Avila was a Fellow of the IEEE. He was President of the Edison Electric Institute and he was a member of the Executive Committee of the Association of Edison Illuminating Companies. He has served on numerous committees of the IEEE and of the EEI. He received the honorary LL.D. degree from the University of Massachusetts in 1963. He received the 1968 IEEE Edison Medal; "For his early contribution to underground transmission, for his continuing guidance in the field of electrical research and for his positive leadership in the development of the electrical utility industry."

He died on October 29, 2000, in Westwood, Massachusetts.
