= Murray Joslin =

William Murray Joslin
- Born: November 21, 1901; Independence, Iowa, United States
- Died: July 1981 (aged 79)
- Awards: IEEE Edison Medal (1976)

William Murray Joslin (November 21, 1901 – July 1981) was an electrical engineer who made major contributions to nuclear power. He was born in Independence, Iowa.

== Biography ==
Joslin obtained his Bachelor of Science degree in electrical engineering from Iowa State University in 1923.

He joined Commonwealth Edison Company, where he became a vice-president of Commonwealth Edison in 1953 and subsequently headed various activities of the company including the early development of nuclear power. The American Society of Mechanical Engineers elected him Fellow in 1973. He received the IEEE Edison Medal in 1976.
