= Philip Torchio =

Italian electrical engineer (1868–1942)

- Born: August 2, 1868; Vercana, Como, Italy
- Died: January 14, 1942 (aged 73); Bronxville, New York, U.S.
- Awards: IEEE Edison Medal (1939)
- Scientific career
- Fields: Electrical engineering

Philip Torchio (August 2, 1868, in Vercana, Como, Italy – January 14, 1942, in Bronxville, New York, U.S.) was an Italian electrical engineer known for his work at the Edison Electric Company and his many inventions in the transmission and distribution of electric energy. He received the IEEE Edison Medal for "distinguished contributions to the art of central station engineering and for achievement in the production, distribution and utilization of electrical energy".

Torchio was the mayor of Bronxville, New York from 1929 to 1931. In 1938, having reached the 70-year age limit, he retired as Vice President of Consolidated Edison.
