= Karl B. McEachron =

American electrical engineer (1889–1954)

- Born: November 17, 1889; Hoosick Falls, New York
- Died: January 24, 1954 (aged 64); Pittsfield, Massachusetts
- Education: Purdue University; Ohio Northern University
- Awards: AIEE Edison Medal (1949); Edward Longstreth Medal (1935)
- Scientific career
- Fields: Electrical engineering

Karl B. McEachron (November 17, 1889 in Hoosick Falls, New York – January 24, 1954 in Pittsfield, Massachusetts) was an American electrical engineer known for his contributions to high-voltage engineering. He received the 1949 AIEE Edison Medal (now IEEE Edison Medal) for "the advancement of electrical science in the field of lightning and other high voltage phenomena and for the application of this knowledge to the design and protection of electric apparatus systems". McEachron received also the 1935 Edward Longstreth Medal of the Franklin Institute.

McEachron received his B.S. in Electrical Engineering and Mechanical Engineering from Ohio Northern University in 1913 and M.S. from Purdue University in 1920.
