= Alexander C. Monteith =

- Born: April 10, 1902; Brucefield, Ontario, Canada
- Died: September 17, 1979 (aged 77); Orleans, Massachusetts, U.S.
- Awards: IEEE Edison Medal (1962)

Alexander Crawford Monteith (April 10, 1902 – September 17, 1979) was a Senior Vice-President of the Westinghouse Electric Corporation, and for more than forty years a leader in the development of electric power systems.

Monteith received his education in electrical engineering at Queen's University, Kingston, Ontario.

He started as a Central Station Engineer and became Senior Vice-President of Westinghouse, and President the American Institute of Electrical Engineers (AIEE), and President of the National Electrical Manufacturers Association. He was an Honorary Member of the American Society of Mechanical Engineers (ASME) and a Fellow of the IEEE. He received the IEEE Edison Medal in 1962. He was elected to the National Academy of Engineering in 1965.
