= Leonid A. Umansky =

Russian-born American electrical engineer (1890–1957)

Leonid Alexandrovich Umansky
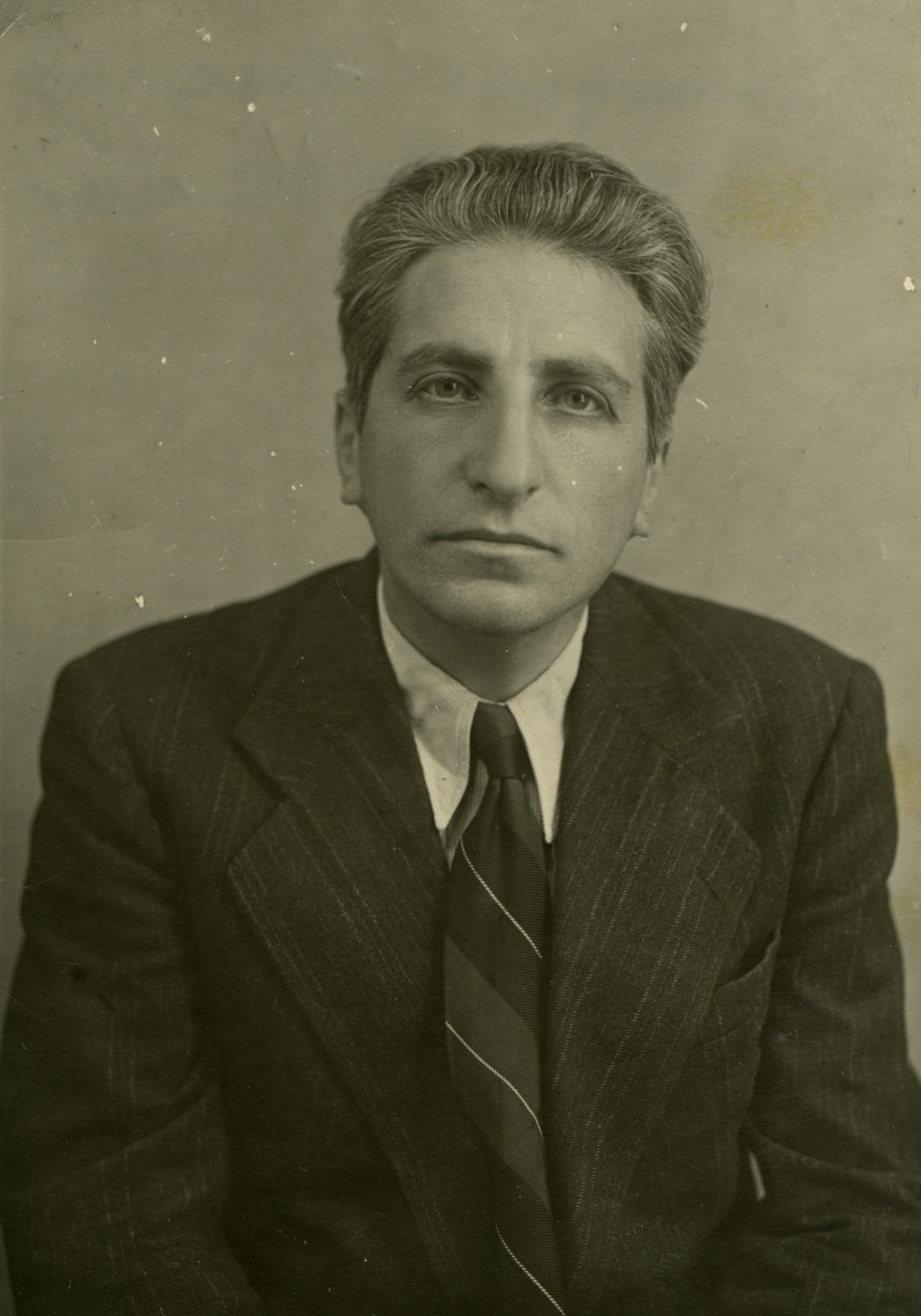
- Born: July 23, 1890; Russia
- Died: April 3, 1957 (aged 66); Schenectady, New York, United States
- Awards: IEEE Edison Medal (1955)

Leonid Alexandrovich Umansky (July 23, 1890 – April 3, 1957) was an American electrical engineer of Russian origin and a recipient of the IEEE Edison Medal for "outstanding contribution to the electrification of industry through the application of electrical machines, devices, and systems to automatic process machinery; and for his inspiration, leadership, and teaching of men in this work".
