= IEEE Edison Medal =

Award presented by the Institute of Electrical and Electronics Engineers (IEEE)

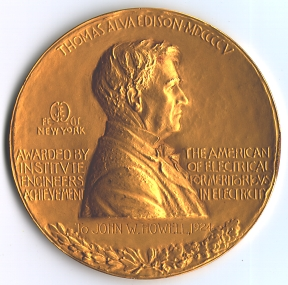
- Awarded for: A career of meritorious achievement in electrical science, electrical engineering, or the electrical arts.
- Country: United States
- Presented by: Institute of Electrical and Electronics Engineers
- First award: 1909
- Website: IEEE Edison Medal

The IEEE Edison Medal is presented by the Institute of Electrical and Electronics Engineers (IEEE) "for a career of meritorious achievement in electrical science, electrical engineering, or the electrical arts." It is the oldest medal in this field of engineering. The award consists of a gold medal, bronze replica, certificate, and honorarium. The medal may only be awarded to a new leap/breakthrough in the technological area of science.

== Background ==
The Edison Medal, named after the inventor and entrepreneur Thomas Edison, was created on 11 February 1904 by a group of Edison's friends and associates. Four years later the American Institute of Electrical Engineers (AIEE) entered into an agreement with the group to present the medal as its highest award. The first medal was presented in 1909 to Elihu Thomson. Other recipients of the Edison Medal include George Westinghouse, Alexander Graham Bell, Nikola Tesla, Michael I. Pupin, Robert A. Millikan (Nobel Prize 1923), and Vannevar Bush. A complete and authoritative list is published by the IEEE online.

After the merger of AIEE and the Institute of Radio Engineers (IRE), in 1963, to form the IEEE, it was decided that IRE's Medal of Honor would be presented as IEEE's highest award, while the Edison Medal would become IEEE's principal medal.

Twelve persons with an exceptional career in electrical engineering received both the IEEE Edison Medal and the IEEE Medal of Honor, namely Edwin Howard Armstrong, Ernst Alexanderson, Mihajlo Pupin, Arthur E. Kennelly, Vladimir K. Zworykin, John R. Pierce, Sidney Darlington, James L. Flanagan, Nick Holonyak, Robert H. Dennard, Dave Forney, and Kees Schouhamer Immink.

== Recipients ==
The following people have received the IEEE Edison Medal:

- 1909: Elihu Thomson
- 1910: Frank J. Sprague
- 1911: George Westinghouse
- 1912: William Stanley, Jr.
- 1913: Charles F. Brush
- 1914: Alexander Graham Bell
- 1915: No Award
- 1916: Nikola Tesla
- 1917: John J. Carty
- 1918: Benjamin G. Lamme
- 1919: William Le Roy Emmet
- 1920: Mihajlo I. Pupin
- 1921: Cummings C. Chesney
- 1922: Robert A. Millikan
- 1923: John W. Lieb
- 1924: John White Howell
- 1925: Harris J. Ryan
- 1926: No Award
- 1927: William D. Coolidge
- 1928: Frank B. Jewett
- 1929: Charles F. Scott
- 1930: Frank Conrad
- 1931: Edwin W. Rice
- 1932: Bancroft Gherardi, Jr.
- 1933: Arthur E. Kennelly
- 1934: Willis R. Whitney
- 1935: Lewis B. Stillwell
- 1936: Alex Dow
- 1937: Gano Dunn
- 1938: Dugald C. Jackson
- 1939: Philip Torchio
- 1940: George Ashley Campbell
- 1941: John B. Whitehead
- 1942: Edwin H. Armstrong
- 1943: Vannevar Bush
- 1944: Ernst Alexanderson
- 1945: Philip Sporn
- 1946: Lee De Forest
- 1947: Joseph Slepian
- 1948: Morris E. Leeds
- 1949: Karl B. McEachron
- 1950: Otto B. Blackwell
- 1951: Charles F. Wagner
- 1952: Vladimir K. Zworykin
- 1953: John F. Peters
- 1954: Oliver E. Buckley
- 1955: Leonid A. Umansky
- 1956: Comfort A. Adams
- 1957: John K. Hodnette
- 1958: Charles F. Kettering
- 1959: James F. Fairman
- 1960: Harold S. Osborne
- 1961: William B. Kouwenhoven
- 1962: Alexander C. Monteith
- 1963: John R. Pierce
- 1964: No Award
- 1965: Walker Lee Cisler
- 1966: Wilmer L. Barrow
- 1967: George Harold Brown
- 1968: Charles F. Avila
- 1969: Hendrik Wade Bode
- 1970: Howard H. Aiken
- 1971: John Wistar Simpson
- 1972: William Hayward Pickering
- 1973: Bernard D. H. Tellegen
- 1974: Jan A. Rajchman
- 1975: Sidney Darlington
- 1976: Murray Joslin
- 1977: Henri G. Busignies
- 1978: Daniel E. Noble
- 1979: Albert Rose
- 1980: Robert Adler
- 1981: C. Chapin Cutler
- 1982: Nathan Cohn
- 1983: Herman P. Schwan
- 1984: Eugene I. Gordon
- 1985: John D. Kraus
- 1986: James L. Flanagan
- 1987: Robert A. Henle
- 1988: James Ross MacDonald
- 1989: Nick Holonyak, Jr.
- 1990: Archie W. Straiton
- 1991: John L. Moll
- 1992: George D. Forney
- 1993: James H. Pomerene
- 1994: Leslie A. Geddes
- 1995: Robert W. Lucky
- 1996: Floyd Dunn
- 1997: Esther M. Conwell
- 1998: Rolf Landauer
- 1999: Kees Schouhamer Immink
- 2000: Jun-ichi Nishizawa
- 2001: Robert H. Dennard
- 2002: Edward E. Hammer
- 2003: No Award
- 2004: Federico Capasso
- 2005: Peter Lawrenson
- 2006: Fawwaz T. Ulaby
- 2007: Russell Dupuis
- 2008: Dov Frohman-Bentchkowsky
- 2009: Tingye Li
- 2010: Ray Dolby
- 2011: Isamu Akasaki
- 2012: Michael Francis Tompsett
- 2013: Ivan P. Kaminow
- 2014: Ralph Baer
- 2015: James Spilker
- 2016: Robert W. Brodersen
- 2017: M. George Craford
- 2018: Eli Yablonovitch
- 2019: Ursula Keller
- 2020: Frede Blaabjerg
- 2021: Kenichi Iga
- 2022: Alan Bovik
- 2023: Hiroyuki Matsunami
- 2024: Vincent W. S. Chan
- 2025: Daniela Rus
- 2026: Eric A. Swanson

== See also ==
- List of engineering awards
- List of physics awards
- List of prizes named after people
