= Laura Umansky =

American interior designer

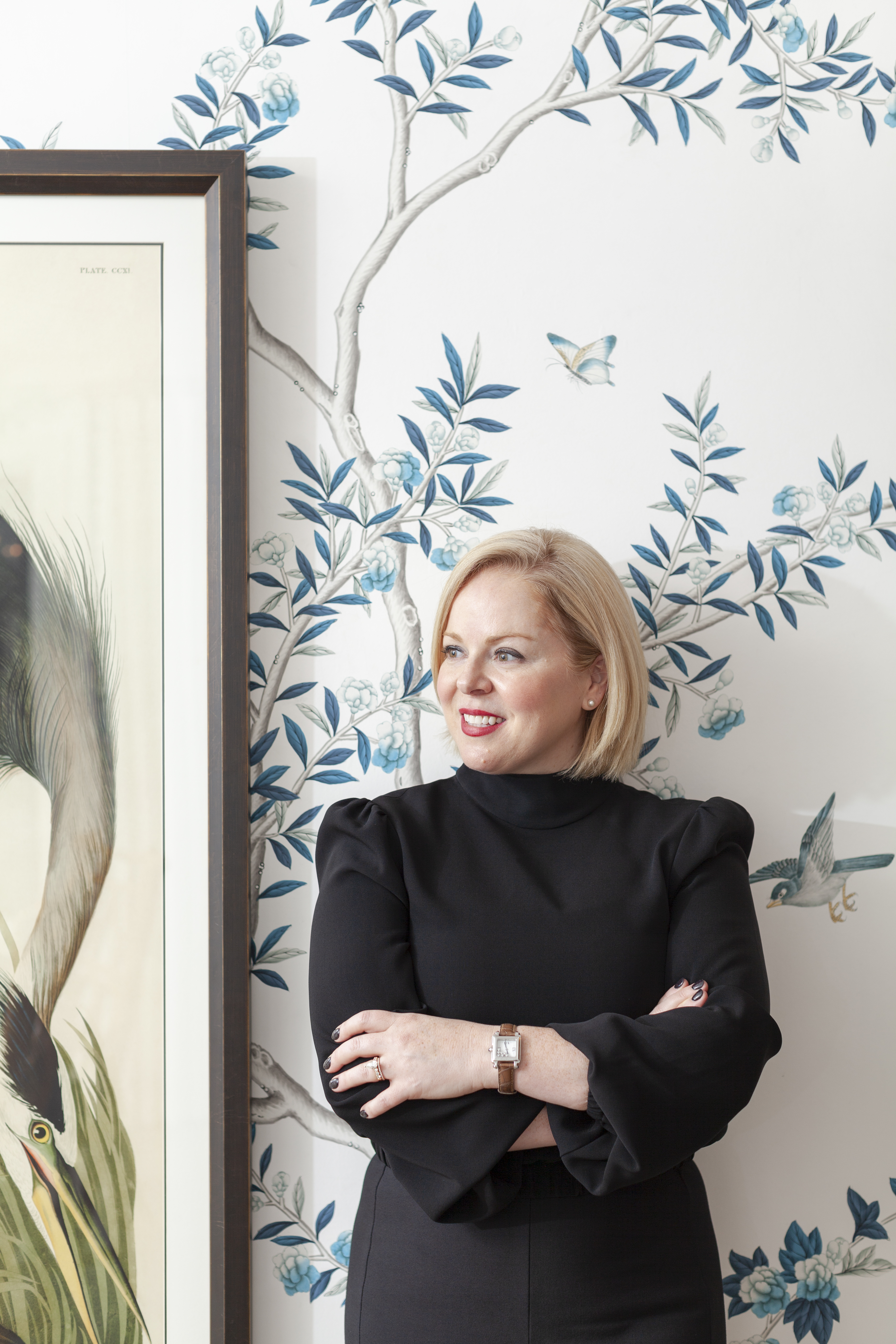
- Umansky in 2019
- Education: University of Texas at Austin; University of Houston
- Occupation: Interior designer
- Website: laurau.com

Laura Umansky is an American interior designer. She is the founder of Laura U Design Collective, a residential interior design studio based in Houston, Texas and Aspen, Colorado. In 2020 she received the ARTS Award in the interior designer category, presented by ART and the Dallas Market Center.

== Early life and education ==
Laura Umansky was born in Seguin, Texas. She attended the University of Texas at Austin. Later, Umansky earned her master's degree in architecture at the University of Houston.

== Career ==
Umansky founded the Laura U Design Studio in Houston in 2006. By 2007 she had also opened a furnishings boutique, the Laura U Collection. Previously, she was an interior designer for other Houston firms. In 2014 the firm added Studio U, a lower-cost design service in Montrose. It closed in 2016. In 2017 the firm acquired a furniture manufacturer.

The firm's projects drew coverage in design publications through the 2010s and early 2020s, among them a 1930s neo-Georgian estate, a European-styled high-rise apartment, a Gulf Coast beach house, kitchen remodels covered by HGTV, and a house in West University Place. In January 2020 Umansky received the ARTS Award for interior designer, presented by ART and the Dallas Market Center at its 31st annual awards. At the 2021 PaperCity Design Awards Houston, a firm project shared the winning entry for residential interior design under 3,500 square feet, with Umansky and the firm's Shannon Smith credited as lead designers.

Umansky first worked in the Aspen area in 2014, when a Houston client hired the firm for a vacation home near Snowmass, and she and her husband bought a house there that summer. In 2020 the family made Colorado their primary home, settling in Snowmass Village, and the firm opened a studio in Aspen while keeping its Houston operation. That year the firm also added residential building design to its services, and by 2021 it had been renamed Laura U Design Collective.

With Melissa Grove, the firm's chief operating officer, Umansky co-founded DesignDash, which describes itself as a community for designers. The two have led educational programming at High Point Market in partnership with the furniture maker Vanguard at each market since October 2024.
