= Alex Dow =

American engineer

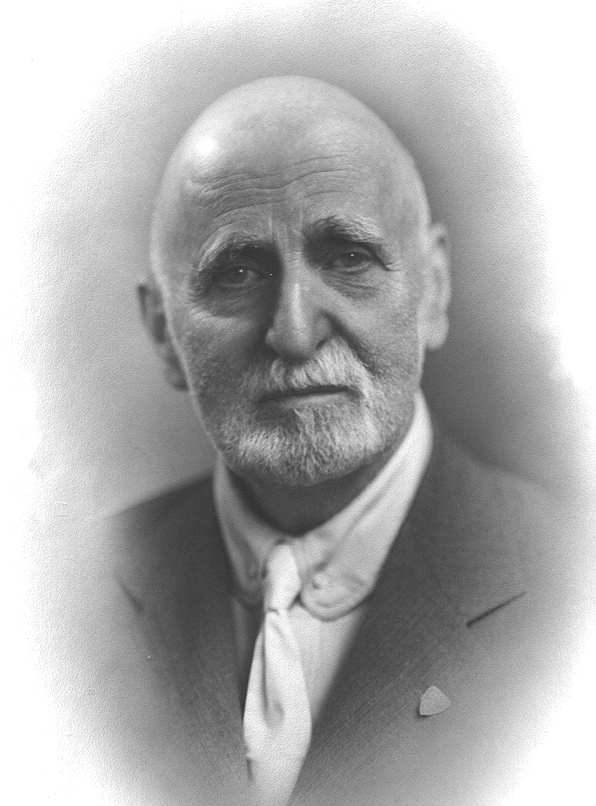
- Alex Dow in 1939
- Born: April 12, 1862; Glasgow, Scotland
- Died: March 22, 1942 (aged 79)
- Citizenship: American
- Known for: Inspiring Henry Ford
- Awards: IEEE Edison Medal (1936)
- Scientific career
- Institutions: Detroit Edison

Alex Dow (April 12, 1862 – March 22, 1942) was an American mechanical and electrical engineer for the city of Detroit. He served as president of the American Society of Mechanical Engineers in the year 1928-1929.

== Biography ==
Dow was born in Glasgow, Scotland as son of William Dow, a blacksmith, and Jean (Keppy) Dow in 1862. He emigrated to the US in 1882 at the age of twenty.

In 1893 Dow was appointed the first plant manager of the first municipally owned power plant in Detroit, and electrical engineer for the city of Detroit. The power plant had been built as a result of Hazen Pingree's efforts to break the power of corporations over Detroit City politics.

It was during this time that Henry Ford worked under Dow at one of the Detroit Edison substations. Dow took Ford with him to the 1896 annual convention of the Association of Edison Illuminating Companies being held that year in New York City. It was at this convention that Dow introduced Ford to Thomas Edison, the meeting with, and encouragement from, the great scientist becoming a great inspiration to Ford in completing his first car.

Dow was appointed water commissioner for the city of Detroit in 1916-1921 and again in 1925-1932. In 1932, he was made the president of Detroit Edison and served until 1940.

He was elected president of the American Society of Mechanical Engineers for the 1928-1929 year. He was a member of the American Society of Mechanical Engineers, American Society of Civil Engineers, American Institute of Electrical Engineers, Institute of Electrical Engineers (Great Britain), Institute of Mechanical Engineers (Great Britain). Dow also served as the President of The Engineering Society of Detroit from 1900-1901.
