= James F. Fairman =

American electrical engineer

- Born: April 8, 1896; Big Rapids, Michigan, U.S.
- Died: April 25, 1967 (aged 71); Birmingham, Michigan, U.S.
- Awards: IEEE Edison Medal (1959)

James Ferdinand Fairman (April 8, 1896 – April 25, 1967) was an American electrical engineer who received the IEEE Edison Medal in 1959 for "outstanding performance in improving the design of large electric power systems; for far-sighted leadership in atomic power development; and for unremitting efforts to improve the engineering profession".
