= Skyforest, California =

Unincorporated community in California, United States

- Unincorporated community
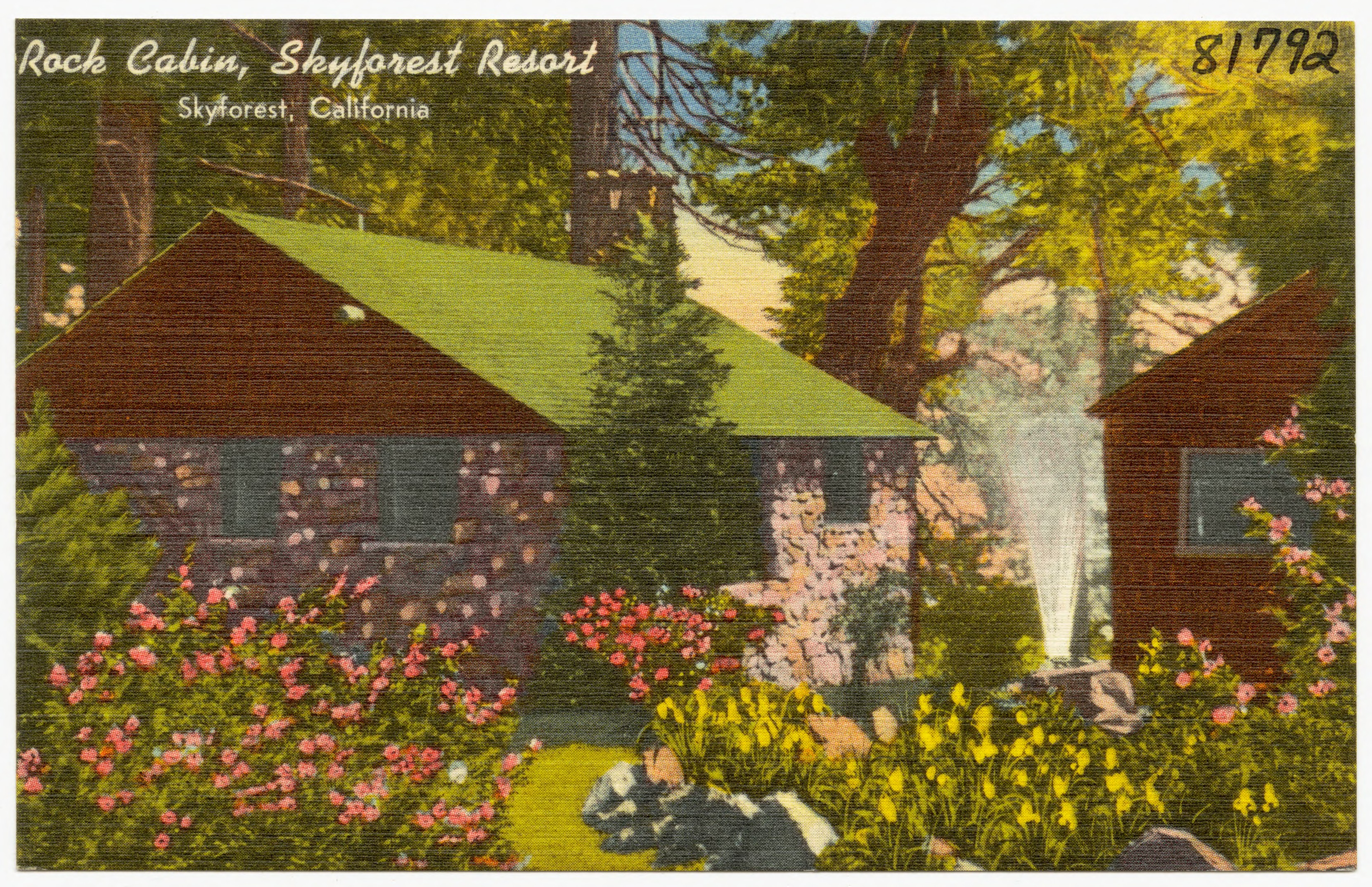
- Postcard from Rock Cabin, Skyforest resort

- Location within California Location within the United States
- Coordinates: 34°14′07″N 117°10′45″W
- Country: United States
- State: California
- County: San Bernardino
- Elevation: 5,741 ft (1,750 m)
- Time zone: UTC-8 (Pacific (PST))
  - Summer (DST): UTC-7 (PDT)
- ZIP code: 92385
- Area code: 909
- GNIS feature ID: 1661451

Skyforest is an unincorporated community in San Bernardino County, California, United States.

Skyforest is located at an elevation of approximately 5,700 feet in the San Bernardino Mountains, along California State Route 18, 1 mile (1.6 km) southeast of Lake Arrowhead and approximately 75 miles east of Los Angeles. Skyforest has a post office with ZIP code 92385, which opened in 1928.

== Ecosystem and natural characteristics ==
Skyforest is situated on a mile-high ridge surrounded by forest of fir, cedar, pine and oak.

According to the Köppen Climate Classification system, Skyforest has a warm-summer Mediterranean climate, abbreviated "Csa" on climate maps.

== History and development ==
Skyforest has long been used for recreation. The history of Skyforest is interwoven with that of the San Bernardino Mountains, a summer hunting ground for indigenous people for thousands of years. Prior to the founding of the local USPS in 1928, residents referred to their community as Forest of The Sky.

The Plott, Kuffel and Henck families were among the first to homestead Skyforest, which grew with the logging industry of the 20th century.

Skyforest today includes three neighborhoods and a small commercial district.

== Commerce ==
As of 2019, there are more than a dozen businesses located in Skyforest including SkyPark . Also located in Skyforest are Rim Family Services, St. Richard's Church, Skyforest Mutual Water Co. and other commercial/residential buildings.

== Demographic information ==
Skyforest is inhabited by humans as well as old world trees, and a diversity of plant and animal wildlife.

Among the human population, there are both full-time and part-time, often living in family units. The permanent population of Skyforest, like the Mountains Community at large, is growing.

Those identifying with Skyforest as their Primary Residence are constituents of CA State Assembly District 33 and State Senate District 23. As an unincorporated community, residents rely on County Officials for representation and public administration as well.

== Environmental data ==
Climate data for Skyforest, California
Month	Jan	Feb	Mar	Apr	May	Jun	Jul	Aug	Sep	Oct	Nov	Dec	Year
Mean daily maximum °F (°C)	46 (8)	49 (9)	53 (12)	60 (16)	67 (19)	76 (24)	82 (28)	81 (27)	77 (25)	66 (19)	54 (12)	47 (8)	63 (17)
Mean daily minimum °F (°C)	29 (−2)	30 (−1)	31 (−1)	35 (2)	41 (5)	48 (9)	56 (13)	56 (13)	51 (11)	42 (6)	34 (1)	30 (−1)	40 (4)
Average precipitation inches (mm)	8.6 (220)	8 (200)	6.5 (170)	2.9 (74)	1.1 (28)	0.2 (5.1)	0.1 (2.5)	0.4 (10)	0.8 (20)	1.6 (41)	4.2 (110)	5.7 (140)	40.1 (1,020)
Source: Weatherbase
