= Robert A. Henle =

- Born: 1923; Virginia, Minnesota
- Died: January 27, 1989 (aged 65–66); New York City, New York
- Awards: IEEE Edison Medal (1987)

Robert Athanasius Henle (1923 – January 27, 1989) was an electrical engineer, who contributed to semiconductor technology.

In 1949, he received the BSEE degree from the University of Minnesota.

Henle joined the IBM where he became involved in semiconductor circuits for computers.

He was appointed an IBM Fellow in 1964. He was elected Fellow of the IEEE, was elected into the National Academy of Engineering, and received the IEEE Edison Medal "For sustained leadership in, and individual contributions to, the science and technology of semiconductor circuits for computing systems."
