= Ben Harper discography =

The discography of Ben Harper consists of seventeen studio albums, five live albums, two digital albums, three concert films and three miscellaneous albums.

== Albums ==
=== Studio albums ===
List of studio albums, with selected details, chart positions, sales and certifications
Title	Album details	Peak chart positions								Sales	Certifications
Title	Album details	US	AUS	BEL (WA)	FRA	NZ	ITA	POR	SWI	Sales	Certifications
Welcome to the Cruel World	Album by Ben Harper; Released: February 8, 1994; Label: Virgin	—	94	—	11	—	—	—	—	US: 332,000	RIAA: Gold; ARIA: Gold; MC: Gold; SNEP: Platinum
Fight for Your Mind	Album by Ben Harper; Released: August 1, 1995; Label: Virgin	—	34	—	39	7	—	—	—	US: 549,000	RIAA: Gold; MC: Platinum; SNEP: Gold
The Will to Live	Album by Ben Harper; Released: June 17, 1997; Label: Virgin	89	17	33	4	1	—	—	37	US: 353,000	ARIA: Platinum; SNEP: Platinum
Burn to Shine	Album by Ben Harper and the Innocent Criminals; Released: September 21, 1999; Label: Virgin	67	2	42	2	5	—	—	34	US: 513,000	RIAA: Gold; ARIA: Platinum; RMNZ: Platinum; SNEP: Platinum
Diamonds on the Inside	Album by Ben Harper; Released: March 11, 2003; Label: Virgin Records	19	2	8	2	2	1	10	3	US: 210,000	RIAA: Gold; AFP: Silver; ARIA: 2× Platinum; FIMI: Platinum; IFPI SWI: Gold; MC: Gold; RMNZ: 2× Platinum; SNEP: Platinum
There Will Be a Light	Album by Ben Harper and The Blind Boys of Alabama; Released: September 21, 2004; Label: Virgin	81	6	19	1	7	1	7	3	US: 197,000	ARIA: Gold; SNEP: 2× Gold
Both Sides of the Gun	Album by Ben Harper; Released: March 21, 2006; Label: Virgin	7	1	6	2	1	1	3	4	US: 126,000	ARIA: Platinum; IFPI SWI: Gold; MC: Gold; RMNZ: Platinum; SNEP: Platinum
Lifeline	Album by Ben Harper & the Innocent Criminals; Released: August 28, 2007; Label: Virgin	9	7	6	1	6	1	5	1	US: 173,000; FRA: 200,000	ARIA: Gold; IFPI SWI: Gold; SNEP: Platinum
White Lies for Dark Times	Album by Ben Harper and Relentless7; Released: May 5, 2009; Label: Virgin	9	17	11	6	11	7	23	7		FRA: Gold
Give Till It's Gone	Album by Ben Harper; Released: May 17, 2011; Label: Virgin	15	9	16	3	13	2	25	6	FRA: 40,000	SNEP: Gold
Get Up!	Album by Ben Harper with Charlie Musselwhite; Released: January 29, 2013; Label: Stax / Concord Music Group	27	44	53	13	30	17	—	55		
Childhood Home	Album by Ben & Ellen Harper; Released: May 6, 2014; Label: Prestige Folklore	43	40	38	38	14	8	—	30	US: 23,000	
Call It What It Is	Album by Ben Harper & The Innocent Criminals; Released: April 8, 2016; Label: Concord Music Group	11	11	17	5	16	6	40	11		
No Mercy in This Land	Album by Ben Harper and Charlie Musselwhite; Released: March 30, 2018; Label: Anti-	132	60	28	—	—	19	—	8		
Winter Is for Lovers	Album by Ben Harper; Released: October 23, 2020; Label: Anti-	—	—	65	67	—	73	—	66		
Bloodline Maintenance	Album by Ben Harper; Released: July 22, 2022; Label: Chrysalis	—	—	93	56	—	—	—	15		
Wide Open Light	Album by Ben Harper; Released: June 2, 2023; Label: Chrysalis	—	—	99	60	—	—	—	33		
"—" denotes a recording that did not chart or was not released in that territory.

=== Live albums ===
List of live albums, with selected details, chart positions and certifications
Title	Album details	Peak chart positions								Certifications
Title	Album details	US	AUS	BEL (WA)	FRA	ITA	NZ	POR	SWI	Certifications
Live from Mars	Album by Ben Harper and the Innocent Criminals; Released: March 27, 2001; Label: Virgin	70	2	19	3	12	3	—	29	RIAA: Gold; ARIA: 2× Platinum; RMNZ: Gold; SNEP: Gold
Live at the Apollo	Album by Ben Harper and The Blind Boys of Alabama; Released: March 14, 2005; Label: Virgin	—	—	—	39	71	—	—	96	
Live at Twist & Shout	Album by Ben Harper & the Innocent Criminals; Released: December 4, 2007; Label: Virgin	—	—	—	—	—	—	—	—	
Live from the Montreal International Jazz Festival	Album by Ben Harper and Relentless7; Released: March 9, 2010; Label: Virgin	151	—	57	57	29	—	19	—	
Live from the Granada Theater: Dallas, Texas September 10, 2013	Album by Ben Harper with Charlie Musselwhite; Released: December 31, 2013; Label: benharper.com	—	—	—	—	—	—	—	—	
"—" denotes a recording that did not chart or was not released in that territory.

=== Other albums ===
List of other albums, with selected details and chart positions
Title	Album details	Peak chart positions				
Title	Album details	US	FRA	ITA	NZ	SWI
Pleasure and Pain	Album by Ben Harper and Tom Freund; Released: March 15, 1992; Label: Cardas	—	—	—	—	—
As I Call You Down	Album by Fistful of Mercy; Released: October 5, 2010; Label: Hot	50	154	—	—	—
By My Side	Career-spanning retrospective album by Ben Harper; Released: October 16, 2012; Label: Virgin / EMI	—	66	20	40	65
"—" denotes a recording that did not chart or was not released in that territory.

=== Virtual albums ===
- iTunes Originals – Ben Harper
- iTunes Must Haves – Ben Harper

== EPs ==
EP, with selected details and chart position
Title	Album details	Peak chart positions
Title	Album details	AUS
Ben Harper Tour EP	Released: April 1996; Format: CD; Label: Virgin	84

== Singles ==
List of singles, with selected chart positions
Title	Year	Peak chart positions							Certifications	Album
Title	Year	US Adult	US AAA	AUS	BRA	ITA	JPN	UK	Certifications	Album
"Like a King" / "Whipping Boy"	1994	—	—	—	—	—	—	—		Welcome to the Cruel World
"Ground on Down"	1995	—	—	—	—	—	—	—		Fight for Your Mind
"Excuse Me Mr."	1996	—	—	—	—	—	—	—		Fight for Your Mind
"Gold to Me"	1996	—	—	—	—	—	—	—		Fight for Your Mind
"Faded"	1997	—	—	43	—	—	—	54		The Will to Live
"Jah Work"	1997	—	—	—	—	—	—	—		The Will to Live
"Glory & Consequence"	1997	—	—	—	—	—	—	—		The Will to Live
"Mama's Trippin'"	1998	—	—	92	—	—	—	—		The Will to Live
"Please Bleed"	1999	—	—	—	—	—	—	—		Burn to Shine
"Burn to Shine"	1999	—	5	—	—	—	—	82		Burn to Shine
"Forgiven"	2000	—	—	50	—	—	—	—		Burn to Shine
"Steal My Kisses"	2000	15	1	—	—	—	—	—		Burn to Shine
"With My Own Two Hands"	2003	—	3	—	—	47	—	—		Diamonds on the Inside
"Diamonds on the Inside"	2003	31	2	68	—	—	—	—		Diamonds on the Inside
"Brown Eyed Blues"	2004	—	—	—	—	—	—	—		Diamonds on the Inside
"Wicked Man"	2004	—	—	—	—	—	—	—		There Will Be a Light
"There Will Be a Light"	2004	—	—	—	—	—	—	—		There Will Be a Light
"Better Way"	2006	—	1	51	—	32	—	—		Both Sides of the Gun
"Get It Like You Like It"	2006	—	8	—	—	—	—	—		Both Sides of the Gun
"Both Sides of the Gun"	2006	—	—	—	—	—	—	—		Both Sides of the Gun
"Morning Yearning"	2006	—	—	—	—	—	—	—		Both Sides of the Gun
"Fight Outta You"	2007	—	25	—	—	—	—	—		Lifeline
"Fango" (with Jovanotti)	2007	—	—	—	—	3	—	—		Safari
"Boa Sorte / Good Luck" (with Vanessa da Mata)	2007	—	—	—	1	18	—	—	FIMI: Gold; PMB: Gold	Sim
"In the Colors"	2008	—	5	—	—	—	—	—		Lifeline
"Fool for a Lonesome Train"	2008	—	—	—	—	—	—	—		Lifeline
"Shimmer & Shine"	2009	—	23	—	—	46	—	—		White Lies for Dark Times
"Fly One Time"	2009	—	22	—	—	—	—	—		White Lies for Dark Times
"Lay There & Hate Me"	2010	—	—	—	—	—	—	—		White Lies for Dark Times
"Skin Thin"	2010	—	—	—	—	—	—	—		White Lies for Dark Times
"The Word Suicide"	2010	—	—	—	—	—	—	—		White Lies for Dark Times
"Never Tear Us Apart" (with INXS)	2010	—	—	—	—	—	—	—		Original Sin
"Rock n' Roll Is Free"	2011	29	29	—	—	—	58	—		Give Till It's Gone
"Don't Give Up on Me Now"	2011	—	—	—	—	32	—	—		Give Till It's Gone
"I Don't Believe a Word You Say"	2012	—	—	—	—	—	—	—		Get Up!
"Pink Balloon"	2016	—	—	—	—	—	—	—		Call It What It Is
"Shine"	2016	—	—	—	—	—	—	—		Call It What It Is
"Uneven Days"	2019	—	—	—	—	—	—	—		Non-album singles
"Black Eyed Dog"	2020	—	—	—	—	—	—	—		Non-album singles
"—" denotes releases that did not chart or were not released.

== Special appearances ==
Ben Harper appears in the (2002) documentary: Standing in the Shadows of Motown where he performs "Ain't Too Proud to Beg" and "I Heard It Through the Grapevine", both are live tracks recorded December 2000

Ben Harper appeared on John Mayer's The Village Sessions EP for the song "Waiting on the World to Change". The album was released on December 12, 2006.

Harper played a slide guitar version of the "Star-Spangled Banner" prior to Game 3 of the 2007 NBA Finals on June 12 in Cleveland. Harper performed alongside Ahmir "?uestlove" Thompson and John Paul Jones at the Bonnaroo Music Festival in 2007. He also appears on the 2003 Pearl Jam DVD Live at the Garden where Harper plays alongside friends Pearl Jam for the songs "Daughter" & "Indifference".

In 2008, Harper played the guitar in the single Fango, track of Safari, album of the Italian singer-songwriter Jovanotti. He and Jovanotti performed the song as guests of Sanremo Music Festival 2008, on February 29. Furthermore, that night Harper sung his song Lifeline.

Harper performed at several "Vote Obama" rallies and on the Willie Nelson show Outlaws & Angels. Harper teamed with the Skatalites to perform Fats Domino's "Be My Guest" on Goin' Home: A Tribute to Fats Domino. Harper was featured, alongside Jack Johnson, playing slide guitar with Toots and the Maytals, performing their 1970s reggae hit "Pressure Drop" on Saturday Night Live.

In January 2010, Harper and his band Relentless7 performed at the Grammy Museum with Ringo Starr in support of The Beatles drummer's self-produced album, Y Not. In early 2010, Harper also performed "Ohio" at the MusiCares tribute to Neil Young.

In July 2011, Harper performed as the headline musician at the Saturday in the Park music festival in Sioux City, IA.

In April 2013, Harper and Charlie Musselwhite were invited to perform in front of President Barack Obama and the First Lady as part of the "In Performance at the White House" series which honoured "Memphis Soul". They performed the track "I'm In, I'm Out and I'm Gone" from the album "Get Up!".

In 2021, Harper played the lap steel guitar on "If Ever", the lead single by Paula Fuga and Jack Johnson off Paula's album Rain on Sunday. This song charted #24 on the Adult Alternative Airplay chart.

Harper played acoustic guitar on "Boyfriends", the twelfth track of Harry Styles' third album, Harry's House.

== Video albums ==
List of video albums, with selected details and certifications
Title	Details	Certification
Pleasure and Pain	Released: 2002	ARIA: Gold
Live at the Hollywood Bowl	Released: 2003	ARIA: Platinum
Live at the Apollo	Released: 2005	
