= Peter Harper (American artist) =

American artist

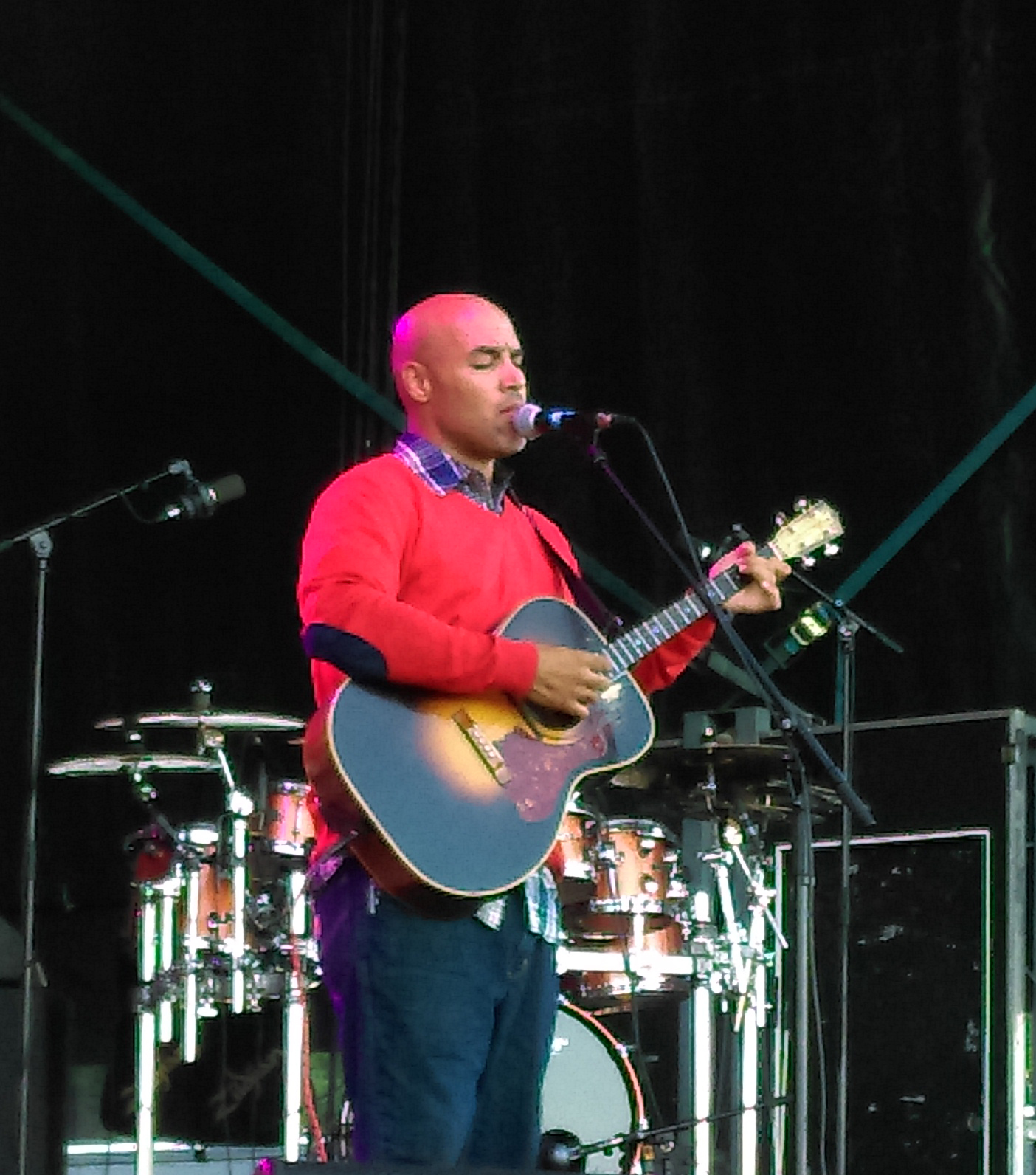

Background information
- Born: 1974 (age 51–52)
- Genres: Folk and soul
- Occupations: Sculptor, musician, singer-songwriter
- Instrument: Tenor guitar
- Website: peterharper.net

Peter M. Harper (born in 1974) is an American sculptor, musician, and academic. He is best known for his vocals and tenor guitar, especially in France, where he has had several concert tours.

== Early life and education ==
Harper was born in 1974, the youngest child of a black father and a Jewish mother, multi-instrumentalist Ellen Harper (née Chase). They divorced before Peter was two years old, and he and his elder brothers, Ben and Joel, were raised by their mother. Friday and Saturday nights she played in a band, working the rest of the time at her parents' music store, the Folk Music Center, in Claremont, California. The shop was a music hub. It sold and repaired instruments, gave music lessons, hosted performances, and in 1976 added a museum of rare and antique instruments and folk art. Harper received no formal art instruction at school, but in the afternoons hung out at the store, where he was exposed to all kinds of instruments, music, and musicians. There he learned instrument repair and started crafting small ceramic sculptures. In his late teens and early twenties, he dabbled with playing guitar, but was unsatisfied with it.

Harper attended Pitzer College in Claremont, where he majored in political studies with an emphasis on the Third World. A semester studying abroad in Zimbabwe when he was 19 was extended after he was admitted to the Mzilikazi Arts and Crafts Centre in Bulawayo. There, he received intensive formal training in figural sculpture. The next year he returned to Pitzer, and completed his BA in 1996. He went on to earn an MA in art at New York University (NYU). After graduate school he returned to Pomona, California, where he learned mold making, and bronze became his favorite medium of sculpture. Through 2006, he averaged about two exhibitions a year, in California and New York.

== Career ==
Harper wasn't a surfer until his brother Ben tried it and rhapsodized about the experience. Peter got a friend who surfs to take him out, and was immediately hooked. Not long thereafter, at the filming of the music video for Ben's 2003 song With My Own Two Hands, Peter met three brothers who allowed that they surfed "sometimes", and invited him to join them. When he did, it immediately became obvious that they were experts, although it wasn't until later that Harper learned the three, Chris, Dan, and Keith Malloy, are famous surfers. It was partly through the Malloys that in 2005 Harper became involved with the Surfrider Foundation. Chris Malloy was helping coordinate a charity art auction for the environmental organization, and asked him to participate. Harper turned a surfboard into a work of art for the fundraiser. It marked the beginning of his commitment to environmental awareness.

In August 2006, he joined California State University Channel Islands as a lecturer in art.

In his mid-thirties, he circled back to music, falling in love with the ukulele, and then the tenor guitar (a four-string relative of the guitar, banjo, and ukulele), and starting to write songs. As he expresses it,

The message I wanted to transmit through my art could no longer take the form of a tangible three dimensional object. I needed to reach deeper into people's minds to make a more profound impact.

He continued to sculpt and teach, but focused increasingly on his music. In 2013, Harper released his self-titled debut album of eleven tracks. He made a solo tour of France in May 2016, playing 17 concerts in intimate venues, mostly in the southwest. A European edition of his first album followed in January 2017, with two additional tracks: an acoustic version of "Take it Home", and an English-French bilingual version of "Can't Stop Now".

At a studio run by Sheldon Gomberg, he recorded a second album, Break the Cycle, with some of the musicians who tour with him in the United States as "Racing Alone". The name of the group echos his conviction that people focus too much on competition, whereas the competition that matters is with oneself, to be better tomorrow than yesterday. He made a second European tour of 28 dates in January–February 2017, concentrated in France, but also including Belgium, England, Spain, and Switzerland. The tour was organized in conjunction with the Surfrider Foundation Europe, for which he formally became an ambassador. Break the Cycle was released in April.

== Discography ==
- 2013 – Peter Harper
- 2016 – Peter Harper: European release
- 2017 – Break the Cycle
- 2019 - Twilight Time
