= Don't Give Up on Me =

Don't Give Up on Me may refer to:

- Don't Give Up on Me (album), an album by Solomon Burke, or the title song
- "Don't Give Up on Me" (Andy Grammer song), 2019
- "Don't Give Up on Me" (Kill the Noise and Illenium song), 2018
- "Don't Give Up on Me", a 1992 song by Gerry Rafferty on the album On a Wing & a Prayer
- "Don't Give Up on Me", a 2020 single by Jamie Cullum
- "Don't Give Up on Me", a 2017 song by Take That from the album Wonderland
- "Touchdown Turnaround (Don't Give Up on Me)", a 2006 song by Hellogoodbye from the album Zombies! Aliens! Vampires! Dinosaurs!

== See also ==
- Don't Give Up on Me Now, a 2011 single by Ben Harper
