= Finding Our Way =

Finding Our Way may refer to:

- Finding Our Way: Rethinking Ecofeminist Politics, a 1991 book by Janet Biehl
- Finding Our Way: Rethinking Ethnocultural Relations in Canada, a 1998 book by Will Kymlicka
- Finding Our Way, a 2010 documentary by Leonie Sandercock
- Finding Our Way, a 2012 album by Hyland (band)
- "Finding Our Way", a song by Ben Harper & the Innocent Criminals from the 2016 album Call It What It Is
