= Give Till It's Gone =

Studio album by Ben Harper
- Released: May 10, 2011
- Genre: Alternative rock; blues rock
- Length: 49:55
- Language: English
- Label: Virgin

Ben Harper chronology
As I Call You Down (2010)	Give Till It's Gone (2011)	Get Up! (2013)

Singles from Give Till It's Gone
- 1. "Rock N' Roll Is Free" Released: March 22, 2011; 2. "Don't Give Up on Me Now" Released: April 1, 2011; 3. "Waiting On a Sign" Released: July 22, 2011

Give Till It's Gone is the tenth studio album by Ben Harper. The album was released in Italy on May 10, 2011 and worldwide on May 17, 2011 by Virgin Records. It is Harper's first solo album since Both Sides of the Gun, released in 2006. However, his band, Relentless7, feature prominently on all the tracks, even co-writing some of the tracks with Harper. The album's title is taken from a line in the second track, "I Will Not Be Broken."

The album was preceded by the single "Rock N' Roll Is Free", released as a free download on March 22, 2011. In Italy, the first single from the album was "Don't Give Up on Me Now", released on April 1, 2011.

In the album, Ben Harper collaborates with the ex-Beatle Ringo Starr, who co-wrote and played the drums in the tracks "Spilling Faith" and "Get There from Here". Another song from the album, "Pray That Our Love Sees the Dawn", features American singer-songwriter Jackson Browne.

== Track listing ==
Give Till It's Gone track listing
No.	Title	Writer(s)	Length
1.	"Don't Give Up on Me Now"	Ben Harper, Jason Mozersky	3:32
2.	"I Will Not Be Broken"	Harper, Mozersky	5:04
3.	"Rock N' Roll Is Free"	Harper	4:21
4.	"Feel Love"	Harper, Mozersky	3:46
5.	"Clearly Severely"	Harper, Mozersky, Jordan Richardson	4:52
6.	"Spilling Faith"	Harper, Mozersky, Richardson, Richard Starkey, Jesse Ingalls	3:31
7.	"Get There from Here"	Harper, Mozersky, Richardson, Starkey, Ingalls	5:54
8.	"Pray That Our Love Sees the Dawn"	Harper, Mozersky	4:42
9.	"Waiting On a Sign"	Harper, Ingalls	5:00
10.	"Dirty Little Lover"	Harper, Richardson	4:46
11.	"Do It for You, Do It for Us"	Harper, Mozersky, Ingalls	4:27

Japanese bonus track
No.	Title	Writer(s)	Length
12.	"Feel Love" (acoustic)	Harper, Mozersky	3:38

== Charts ==
Chart performance for Give Till It's Gone
Chart (2011)	Peak position
Australian Albums Chart	9
Belgian Albums Chart (Flanders)	72
Belgian Albums Chart (Wallonia)	16
Canadian Albums Chart	12
French Albums Chart	3
Italian Albums Chart	2
New Zealand Albums Chart	13
Portuguese Albums Chart	25
Spanish Albums Chart (Flanders)	49
Swiss Albums Chart	6
US Billboard 200	15

== Certifications ==
Certifications for Give Till It's Gone
Region	Certification	Certified units/sales
France (SNEP)	Gold	50,000^{*}
^{*} Sales figures based on certification alone.
