= Roundel =

Circular disc used as a symbol

The Tricolore cockade of the French Air Force was first used on military aircraft before the First World War

A roundel is a circular disc used as a symbol. The term is used in heraldry, but also for a type of national insignia used on military aircraft and sometimes combat vehicles, generally circular and usually comprising concentric rings of different colours. Roundels are used in many other contexts as well.

== Heraldry ==
In heraldry, a roundel is a circular charge. Roundels are among the oldest charges used in coats of arms, dating from at least the twelfth century. Roundels in British heraldry have different names depending on their tincture. Thus, while a roundel may be blazoned by its tincture, e.g., a roundel vert (literally "a roundel green"), it is more often described by a single word, in this case pomme (literally "apple", from the French) or, from the same origins, pomeis—as in "Vert; on a cross Or five pomeis" (a green field with a golden/yellow cross on which are drawn five green roundels/circles).

One special example of a named roundel is the fountain, depicted as a roundel barry wavy argent and azure, that is, containing alternating horizontal wavy bands of blue and silver (or white).

== Military aircraft ==
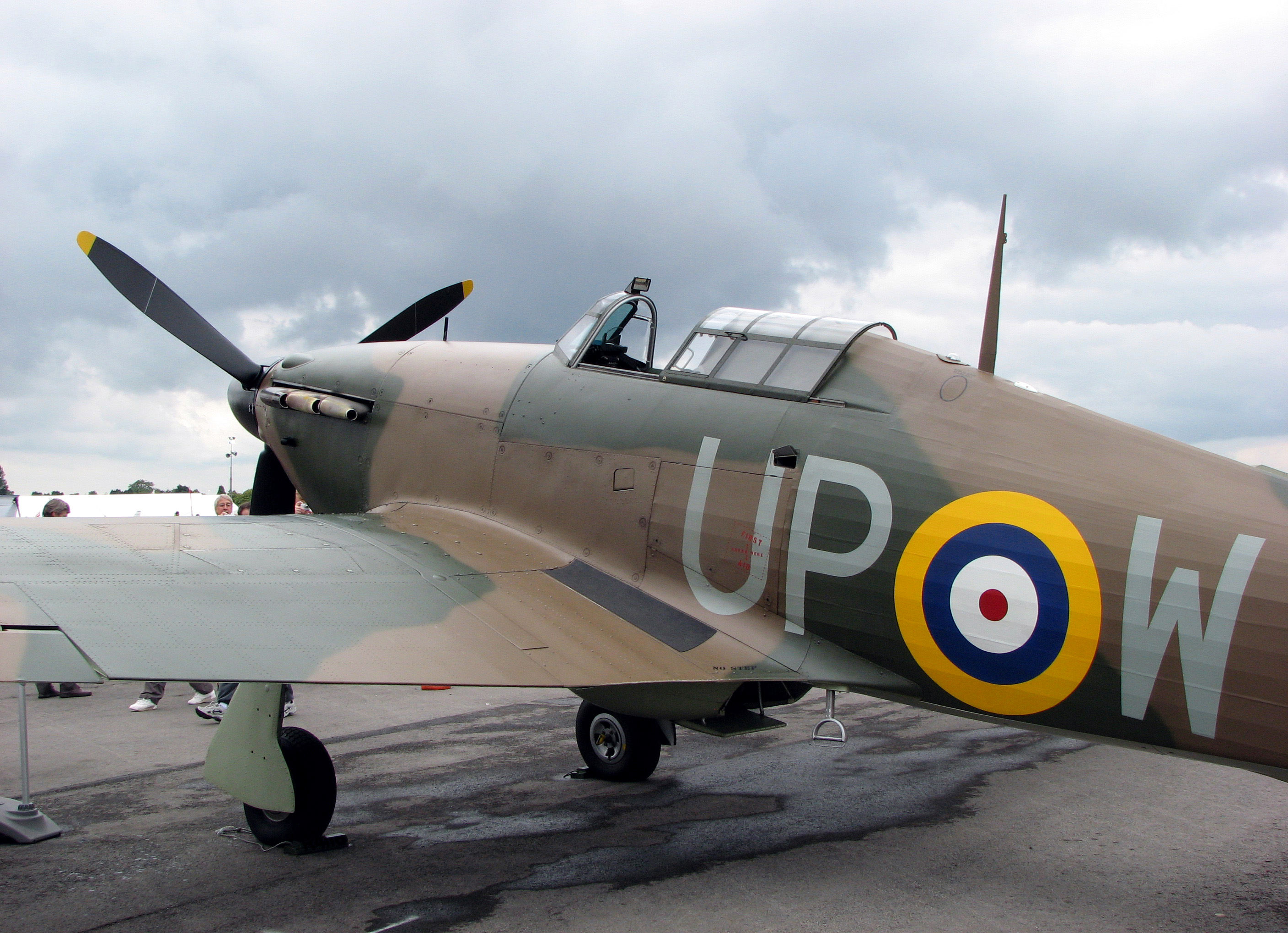
Hawker Hurricane showing a Second World War-era Royal Air Force roundel

The French Air Service originated the use of roundels on military aircraft during the First World War. The chosen design was the French national cockade, whose colours are the blue-white-red of the flag of France. Similar national cockades, with different ordering of colours, were designed and adopted as aircraft roundels by their allies, including the British Royal Flying Corps and Royal Naval Air Service, and (in the last few months of the war) the United States Army Air Service. After the First World War, many other air forces adopted roundel insignia, distinguished by different colours or numbers of concentric rings.

The term "roundel" is often used even for those military aircraft insignia that are not round, like the Iron Cross-Balkenkreuz symbol of the Luftwaffe or the red star of the Russian Air Force.

== Flags ==
Among national flags which display a roundel are the flags of Bangladesh, Belize, Brazil, Burundi, Dominica, Ethiopia, Grenada, India, Japan, Kazakhstan, Kyrgyzstan, Laos, Mongolia, Namibia, Niger, North Korea, North Macedonia, Palau, Paraguay, Rwanda, South Korea, Republic of China (Taiwan), Tunisia, and Uganda.

Flags for British Overseas Territories used a British Blue Ensign defaced with a roundel displaying the arms or badge of the dependency until 1999. The same pattern is still used for all the states of Australia except Victoria.

== Roundels in modern design ==
Roundels are used in logos to suggest values such as harmony, balance, symmetry, proportion, and circularity, as established by Pamela W. Henderson & Joseph A. Cote. However, for a simple logo, such as the Target logo, to become associated with the brand, the brand needs to be well known and have unique branding.

== In popular culture ==
The Who logo incorporates the roundel symbol used by mods

- The roundel, especially that used by the Royal Air Force, has been associated with pop art of the 1960s, appearing in paintings by Jasper Johns and British artist Sir Peter Blake. It became part of the pop consciousness when British rock group The Who wore RAF roundels (and Union Flags) as part of their stage apparel at the start of their career. Subsequently it came to symbolise Mods and the Mod revival.
- The Canadian National Hockey League team, the Winnipeg Jets, use the Royal Canadian Air Force Roundel as the basis of their primary logo, with a fighter jet overlaid on top of the red maple leaf.
- Some of Paul Weller's material involves the use of a roundel in psychedelic colours and in particular this featured in the design of his album Stanley Road created with the aforementioned Sir Peter Blake who was also responsible for designing the Beatles Sgt. Pepper's Lonely Hearts Club Band album cover and art.
- Ben Harper's album Fight for Your Mind uses roundels from several air forces as graphics in the liner notes.
- In the British television series Doctor Who, the circular decorations on the interior walls of the TARDIS control room are known as roundels.

== Examples ==
=== Military aircraft roundels ===
Bangladesh Air Force

Czech Air Force

Royal Canadian Air Force

Swiss Air Force

Royal Thai Air Force

Korean People's Army Air Force

South African Air Force

Swedish Air Force

South Sudan Air Force

Romanian Armed Forces

=== Other roundels ===
Some corporations and organizations make use of roundels in their branding.

London Underground

BMW

S.S.C. Napoli, an Italian football club

Winnipeg Jets, a Canadian NHL hockey team

Boston Bruins, an American NHL hockey team

Pittsburgh Steelers, an American NFL team

Don Valley Parkway shield

Logo of the Target Corporation

Logo of Tide

== See also ==
- Bezant § Heraldry
- Fin flash
- Goutte
