= Burn to Shine =

Burn to Shine may refer to:

- Burn to Shine (album), an album by Ben Harper
- Burn to Shine (DVD series), a live music DVD series created by Brendan Canty
