= Live from Mars =

Live album by Ben Harper & the Innocent Criminals
- Released: March 27, 2001
- Recorded: 2000
- Genre: Rock
- Length: 136:00
- Label: Virgin
- Producer: Ben Harper, Jean-Pierre Plunier

Ben Harper & the Innocent Criminals chronology
Burn to Shine (1999)	Live from Mars (2001)	Diamonds On the Inside (2003)

Professional ratings
Review scores
Source	Rating
AllMusic	4/5 stars

Live from Mars is a two disc live concert(s) release from Ben Harper & the Innocent Criminals, which takes tracks from unnamed venues throughout his 2000 tour and places them on either an electric (disc 1) or acoustic (disc 2) disc. It was released in the year 2001.

== Cover Featuring ==
The album features three covers, which Harper often performs in concert:

- Marvin Gaye – "Sexual Healing"
- Led Zeppelin – "Whole Lotta Love"
- The Verve – "The Drugs Don't Work"

== Track listing ==
All songs written by Ben Harper, except as noted.

=== Disc 1 ===
1. "Glory & Consequence"
2. "Excuse Me Mr." (Ben Harper, Jean-Pierre Plunier)
3. "Alone"
4. "Sexual Healing" (Marvin Gaye, Odell Brown, David Ritz)
5. "Woman in You"
6. "Ground on Down"
7. "Steal My Kisses"
8. "Burn One Down"
9. "Mama's Got a Girlfriend"
10. "Welcome to the Cruel World"
11. "Forgiven"
12. "Faded/Whole Lotta Love" (Ben Harper/Jimmy Page, Robert Plant, John Bonham, John Paul Jones, Willie Dixon)

=== Disc 2 ===
1. "Waiting on an Angel"
2. "Roses from My Friends"
3. "Power of the Gospel"
4. "Pleasure and Pain"
5. "Please Bleed"
6. "The Drugs Don't Work" (Richard Ashcroft)
7. "In the Lord's Arms"
8. "Not Fire, Not Ice"
9. "Beloved One"
10. "Number Three"
11. "Walk Away"
12. "Another Lonely Day"
13. "Like a King/I'll Rise" (Ben Harper/Maya Angelou, Ben Harper)

== Charts ==
=== Weekly charts ===
Weekly chart performance for Live from Mars
Chart (2001)	Peak position
Australian Albums (ARIA)	2
Belgian Albums (Ultratop Wallonia)	19
French Albums (SNEP)	3
Italian Albums (FIMI)	12
New Zealand Albums (RMNZ)	3
Swiss Albums (Schweizer Hitparade)	29
US Billboard 200	70

=== Year-end charts ===
2001 year-end chart performance for Live from Mars
Chart (2001)	Position
Australian Albums (ARIA)	28
French Albums (SNEP)	50

2002 year-end chart performance for Live from Mars
Chart (2002)	Position
Australian Albums (ARIA)	87

== Certifications ==
Certifications for Live from Mars
Region	Certification	Certified units/sales
Australia (ARIA)	2× Platinum	140,000^{^}
France (SNEP)	Gold	100,000^{*}
United States (RIAA)	Gold	500,000^{^}
^{*} Sales figures based on certification alone.^{^} Shipments figures based on certification alone.
