= Fight for Your Mind =

Studio album by Ben Harper
- Released: August 1, 1995
- Genre: Alternative rock
- Length: 68:05
- Label: Virgin
- Producer: Ben Harper; Jean-Pierre Plunier; Bob "Stiv" Coke

Ben Harper chronology
Welcome to the Cruel World (1994)	Fight for Your Mind (1995)	The Will to Live (1997)

Professional ratings
Review scores
Source	Rating
AllMusic	4/5 stars
Chicago Tribune	3.5/4 stars
Entertainment Weekly	B+
The Guardian	4/5 stars
Q	3/5 stars
The Rolling Stone Album Guide	2/5 stars

Fight for Your Mind is the second album by Ben Harper. Released on August 1, 1995, it was his last solo album before adding the Innocent Criminals to his line-up. Reviews were generally very positive, praising Harper's fusion of multiple genres, from folk ("Another Lonely Day"), folk rock ("Gold to Me"), and politically charged reggae ("Excuse Me Mr.").

After Harper's well-received debut, Welcome to the Cruel World, he expanded on his fanbase by touring relentlessly with jam bands like Dave Matthews Band. On this, his second album, Harper added a more refined sense of his own intense spirituality, such as on the gospel-influenced album closers, "Power of the Gospel", "God Fearing Man" and "One Road to Freedom".

== Artwork ==
The album cover features Harper's face on fire, as the artwork features the use of military roundels from African nations (plus Jamaica) to represent each track on the album. The track corresponding to each roundel is:

- Angola – "Oppression"
  African Military roundels (plus Jamaica's) in the artwork
- Cameroon – "Ground on Down"
- Central African Republic – "Another Lonely Day"
- Chad – "Please Me Like You Want To"
- Uganda – "Gold to Me"
- Jamaica – "Burn One Down"
- Egypt – "Excuse Me Mr"
- Niger – "People Lead"
- Ghana/Guinea – "Fight for Your Mind"
- Kenya – "Give a Man a Home"
- Nigeria – "By My Side"
- Somalia – "Power of the Gospel"
- Ivory Coast – "God Fearing Man"
- Ethiopia – "One Road to Freedom"

Harper has continued to use roundel-inspired artwork on his other albums.

== Track listing ==
All songs written by Ben Harper except as noted.

1. "Oppression" – 2:58
2. "Ground on Down" – 4:53
3. "Another Lonely Day" – 3:43
4. "Please Me Like You Want To" – 4:55
5. "Gold to Me" – 5:00
6. "Burn One Down" – 3:31
7. "Excuse Me Mr." (Harper, Jean-Pierre Plunier) – 5:24
8. "People Lead" – 4:13
9. "Fight for Your Mind" – 4:06
10. "Give a Man a Home" – 3:35
11. "By My Side" – 3:34
12. "Power of the Gospel" – 6:02
13. "God Fearing Man" – 11:49
14. "One Road to Freedom" – 4:14

== Personnel ==
=== Musicians ===
- Ben Harper – acoustic guitar, vocals, weissenborn
- Brett Banduci – viola
- Danielle Charles – violin
- Oliver Charles – drums
- Bob "Stiv" Coke - tabla, tambourine, tamboura, sarod
- Timothy Loo – cello
- Leon Mobley – percussion
- Juan Nelson – bass guitar
- Ervin Pope – organ, Hammond organ

=== Production ===
- Producers: Ben Harper, Bob "Stiv" Coke, J.P. Plunier
- Associate producer: Jeff Gottlieb
- Assistant producer: Jeff Gottlieb
- Engineer: Bradley Cook
- Assistant engineers: Ryan Boesh, Todd Burke, Paul Naguna
- Mixing: The Dub Brothers, Femi Jiya, Eric Sarafin
- Mastering: Eddy Schreyer
- String arrangements: Ben Harper, J.P. Plunier
- Design: Tom Dolan
- Art direction: Tom Dolan, J.P. Plunier
- Photography: Bob "Stiv" Coke, Jeff Gottlieb
- Research: Ben Elder

== Charts ==
Chart performance for Fight for Your Mind
Chart (1999)	Peak position
Australian Albums (ARIA)	34
Belgian Albums (Ultratop Wallonia)	44
French Albums (SNEP)	39
New Zealand Albums (RMNZ)	7

== Certifications and sales ==
Certifications for Fight for Your Mind
Region	Certification	Certified units/sales
Canada (Music Canada)	Platinum	100,000^{^}
France (SNEP)	2× Gold	200,000^{*}
New Zealand (RMNZ)	Platinum	15,000^{^}
United States (RIAA)	Gold	544,000
^{*} Sales figures based on certification alone.^{^} Shipments figures based on certification alone.
