= Fly One Time =

Single by Ben Harper and Relentless7

from the album White Lies for Dark Times
- Released: 2009
- Recorded: 2009
- Genre: Blues rock
- Length: 4:12
- Label: Virgin Records
- Songwriter(s): Ben Harper, Jesse Ingalls, Jason Mozersky, Jordan Richardson

Ben Harper and Relentless7 singles chronology
"Shimmer & Shine" (2009)	"Fly One Time" (2009)	"Lay There & Hate Me" (2010)

"Fly One Time" is a song by singer-songwriter Ben Harper and rock band Relentless7. It is the seventh track on their 2009 album, White Lies for Dark Times, and was released as the album's second single. The song was first performed by Harper and Relentless7 in October 2008 at the Chevrolet centre in Youngstown, Ohio.

== Writing and recording ==
In an interview with Spinner, Harper says the song is about "taking a risk - not allowing complacency to step in as a daily ritual." He adds, "It's really about stepping out of your life and stepping to it."

Ben Harper and Relentless7 produced a music video for the song. Complementing the song's theme, the video features footage of athletes in action including Laird Hamilton and Lance Armstrong.
