= Bloodline Maintenance =

Studio album by Ben Harper
- Released: July 22, 2022
- Length: 32:06
- Language: English
- Label: Chrysalis
- Producer: Sheldon Gomberg; Ben Harper

Ben Harper chronology
Winter Is for Lovers (2020)	Bloodline Maintenance (2022)	Wide Open Light (2023)

Bloodline Maintenance is a 2022 studio album from American singer-songwriter Ben Harper, released on Chrysalis Records.

== Reception ==
Writing for American Songwriter, Hal Horowitz gave this release four out of five stars, calling it a return to form after 2020's Winter Is for Lovers, with the artist laying "down a verbal and musical gauntlet". Editors of AllMusic Guide scored this album four out of five stars, with critic Stephen Thomas Erlewine commenting noting themes of intergenerational trauama and the death of longtime bandmate Juan Nelson (to whom the album is dedicated). In Mojo, John Aizelwood rated Bloodline Maintenance three out of five stars, characterizing it as a "diverse collection" that does not "stray[...] too far from his usual template". Writing for The Arts Desk, Thomas H. Green calls out several possible musical touchstones and influences and characterizes the music as "combin[ing] a sinewy energy and solid lyrics with well-chosen retro influences that don't overshadow the end result" with Harper's "guitar-play, unshowy, imaginative and likeably expressive".

== Track listing ==
All songs written by Ben Harper

1. "Below Sea Level" – 1:47
2. "We Need to Talk About It" – 2:53
3. "Where Did We Go Wrong" – 2:44
4. "Problem Child" – 4:31
5. "Need to Know Basis" – 1:59
6. "It Aint No Use" – 3:29
7. "More Than Love" – 3:07
8. "Smile at the Mention" – 3:38
9. "Honey, Honey" – 3:31
10. "Knew the Day Was Comin'" – 2:10
11. "Maybe I Can't" – 2:12

== Personnel ==
- Ben Harper – guitar, vocals, bass guitar, keyboards, drums, arrangement, production

Additional musicians

- Geoff Burke – flute on "Problem Child" and "Smile at the Mention", alto saxophone on "Smile at the Mention", baritone saxophone on "Problem Child", tenor saxophone on "Problem Child" and "Smile at the Mention", horn and woodwind arrangement on "Smile at the Mention"
- Anna Butterss – bass guitar on "Knew the Day Was Comin'"
- De'Ante Duckett – backing vocals and vocal arrangement on "We Need to Talk About It"
- Larry Goldings – clavinet on "Need to Know Basis"
- Bruce Harris – trumpet on "Smile at the Mention"
- Chris Joyner – keyboards on "Where Did We Go Wrong" and "More Than Love"
- DJ Johnny Juice – drums, percussion, and turntable on "Problem Child"
- Alethea Mills – backing vocals and vocal arrangement on "We Need to Talk About It"
- Leon Mobley – percussion on "Where Did We Go Wrong"
- Jimmy Paxson – drums and additional percussion on "Where Did We Go Wrong"
- Chavonne Stewart – backing vocals and vocal arrangement on "We Need to Talk About It"
- Jason Yates – keyboards on "It Ain't No Use" and "Honey, Honey", congas on "It Ain't No Use"

Technical personnel

- Michael Halsband – back cover photography
- Sheldon Gomberg – additional engineering, mixing at The Carriage House, production
- Jason Gossman – additional engineering
- Gavin Lurssen – mastering
- Jackie Phillips – art design
- Kevin Smith – engineering

== Chart performance ==
Bloodline Maintenance topped out at 56 on Syndicat National de l'Édition Phonographique's French charts on the week of August 1, and 15 on Swiss Hitparade.
