= Burn One Down (Ben Harper song) =

Song by Ben Harper

from the album Fight for Your Mind
- Released: August 1, 1995
- Genre: Alternative rock
- Length: 3:31
- Label: Virgin Records
- Songwriter(s): Ben Harper

"Burn One Down" is a song written and performed by Ben Harper as the sixth track on his 1995 album Fight for Your Mind. The song has been called a "James-Taylor-meets-Bob-Marley moment" for Harper, and the song is a pro-marijuana anthem. It remains one of Harper's most performed songs live.
