= Pleasure and Pain =

Pleasure and Pain may refer to:

== Albums ==
- Pleasure & Pain (112 album), 2005
- Pleasure & Pain (T'Pau album), 2015
- Pleasure and Pain (Dr. Hook album), 1978
- Pleasure and Pain (Theatres des Vampires album), or the title song, 2005
- Pleasure and Pain, a 1992 album by Ben Harper and Tom Freund, or a 2002 DVD by Harper

== Songs ==
- "Pleasure and Pain" (song), by the Divinyls, 1985
- "Pleasure and Pain", by Bullet for My Valentine from Fever, 2010
- “Pain and Pleasure” by Judas Priest from the 1982 album Screaming for Vengeance

== See also ==
- Pain and pleasure, in philosophy
- Pain and Pleasure, a 1986 EP by Klinik
