= Better Way =

Single by Ben Harper

from the album Both Sides of the Gun
- Released: 2006
- Recorded: 2006
- Genre: Raga rock, blues rock
- Length: 3:59
- Label: Virgin Records
- Songwriter(s): Ben Harper

Ben Harper singles chronology
"There Will Be a Light" (2004)	"Better Way" (2006)	"Both Sides of the Gun" (2006)

"Better Way" is a song by singer-songwriter Ben Harper. It is the first track on disc two of his 2006 album Both Sides of the Gun, and was released as the album's first single. A live version of the song appears on Songs for Tibet: The Art of Peace, a compilation album by various artists supporting Tibet. The song also served as a campaign song for Barack Obama during his 2008 presidential campaign.

== Themes ==
A few music journalists have compared the song to John Lennon's "Give Peace a Chance". Noting the songs are similar because they both express anger at current problems, but do not address how these problems were created or how they will be solved.
