= Wide Open Light =

Studio album by Ben Harper
- Released: June 2, 2023
- Studio: The Carriage House (Silver Lake); Sydney Opera House (Sydney); Henson (Los Angeles)
- Genre: Folk
- Length: 36:02
- Label: Chrysalis
- Producer: Ben Harper; Danny Kalb; Jason Mozersky

Ben Harper chronology
Bloodline Maintenance (2022)	Wide Open Light (2023)

Wide Open Light is the seventeenth studio album by American singer-songwriter Ben Harper, released on June 2, 2023, through Chrysalis Records. It was preceded by the lead single "Yard Sale" featuring Jack Johnson. Harper will tour Europe and North America from July 2023.

== Background ==
In an interview with Harper's Bazaar, the album is described as a "stripped-down, minimally-produced meditation on love, loss, and longing featuring 11 previously unreleased songs." Harper explained, "I've been setting certain songs aside for the day I would hopefully release this album. It captures me exploring my way to being 53 years old... At its finest, it’s a reinvention of a style and sound. It’s something different than what is obviously categorizable because it's Black folk soul music.

Most of the songs contain instrumentation only from an acoustic guitar, with Spin describing the songs as "spare and organic" and Harper stating that he has not "been that raw and that exposed on record—just me and guitar—for an entire album ever". He described his motive for a mostly acoustic album as "There was once a time when albums didn't need an adjacent story or fable. When the songs were enough." The album was additionally described in a press statement as "a family of songs [...] where each track is a close relative to the next" and "deliberately minimalist".

== Critical reception ==
Glide Magazine's Jim Hynes described the album as "a straight-forward singer-songwriter album, a folk album centered on personal songs, each related to the next, weighted toward pivotal moments and resilience", calling its centerpiece "Yard Sale" due to its "clever lyrics" and "catchy chorus". Hynes concluded that "the crafty imagery, wordplay, and indelible choruses will likely linger". Hal Horwowitz wrote for American Songwriter that the album provides a "tantalizing, understated intimacy few other singer/songwriters can conjure with this spare, dialed-down approach." Riff Magazine's Tony Hicks wrote, "Harper vocally channels Cat Stevens and Paul Simon, pouring his heart out while mixing his voice with lots of slide guitar, piano and heartfelt arrangement. It’s raw and moody and, at times, evokes memories of campfires and clouds parting over green hills."

== Track listing ==
All tracks are written by Ben Harper, except "Masterpiece" written by Harper and Jason Mozersky

Wide Open Light track listing
No.	Title	Length
1.	"Heart and Crown"	2:09
2.	"Giving Ghosts"	4:11
3.	"Masterpiece"	2:44
4.	"8 Minutes"	2:16
5.	"Yard Sale" (with Jack Johnson)	4:17
6.	"Trying Not to Fall in Love with You"	3:33
7.	"Wide Open Light"	4:10
8.	"One More Change"	3:48
9.	"Growing Growing Gone"	2:28
10.	"Love After Love"	2:32
11.	"Thank You Pat Brayer"	3:54
Total length:		36:02

== Personnel ==
Musicians

- Ben Harper – vocals (2–10), 12-string acoustic guitar (track 1), lap steel guitar (2–5), piano (3, 6), acoustic guitar (3), guitar (5, 7–11), mandocello (11)
- Jason Mozersky – guitar (4, 10)
- Shelby Lynne – additional vocals on (4)
- Jack Johnson – vocals, slack-key guitar (5)
- Piers Faccini – oud guitar, additional vocals (7)
- Travis Taylor – additional background vocals (7), background vocals (8)
- Keesha Gumbs – additional background vocals (7), background vocals (8)
- Karyn Porter – additional background vocals (7), background vocals (8)
- Jesse Ingalls – bass (10)
- Jimmy Paxson – drums (10)
- Rebecca Schlappich – violin (10)

Technical

- Ben Harper – production
- Jason Mozersky – production (all tracks), guitar engineering (4)
- Danny Kalb – production (all tracks), mixing (5, 8, 11), engineering (11)
- Gavin Lurssen – mastering
- James Shaw – mixing, engineering (2)
- Sheldon Gomberg – engineering (1)
- Kevin Smith – engineering (1)
- Jaime Sickora – engineering (6)
- Gabriel Veltri – engineering for Shelby Lynne (4)
- Simon Beins – engineering for Jack Johnson (5)
- Mike Valerio – bass engineering (3)
- Jimmy Paxson – drum engineering (10)
- Rebecca Schlappich – violin engineering (10)

Visuals

- Jackie Phillips – art design
- Ben Harper – cover photo
- Michael Halsband – back cover photo

== Charts ==
Chart performance for Wide Open Light
Chart (2023)	Peak position
Belgian Albums (Ultratop Wallonia)	99
French Albums (SNEP)	60
Swiss Albums (Schweizer Hitparade)	33
