= Welcome to the Cruel World =

Studio album by Ben Harper
- Released: February 8, 1994
- Recorded: The Convent
- Genre: Acoustic blues
- Length: 50:25
- Label: Virgin
- Producer: Ben Harper, Jean-Pierre Plunier

Ben Harper chronology
Welcome to the Cruel World (1994)	Fight for Your Mind (1995)

Welcome to the Cruel World is the debut album by the American musician Ben Harper, released in 1994 through Virgin Records. The album established Harper as a popular folk musician in the California area. After the release, Harper went on to add a permanent backing band, the Innocent Criminals, although they remained unnamed until the Burn to Shine album. The song "I'll Rise" is based on a 1978 Maya Angelou poem "And Still I Rise".

== Critical reception ==
Professional ratings
Review scores
Source	Rating
AllMusic	3/5 stars
Chicago Tribune	3/4 stars
The Guardian	4/4 stars
The Indianapolis Star	3/4 stars
Los Angeles Times	3.5/4 stars
Q	4/5 stars
The Rolling Stone Album Guide	3/5 stars
USA Today	3/4 stars
The Village Voice	(choice cut)

The Indianapolis Star wrote that "Harper impresses with his play of guitar and dobro, but it's his mastery of the Weissenborn ... and his vocal nuances that persuade the listener to heed these vignettes of cold truth, the essence of blues."

== Track listing ==
All songs written by Ben Harper except as noted.

1. "The Three of Us" – 2:35
2. "Whipping Boy" (Chris Darrow) – 5:31
3. "Breakin' Down" (Harper, music: Jean-Pierre Plunier) – 4:00
4. "Don't Take That Attitude to Your Grave" – 4:25
5. "Waiting on an Angel" – 3:53
6. "Mama's Got a Girlfriend Now" – 2:29
7. "Forever" – 3:23
8. "Like a King" – 4:18
9. "Pleasure and Pain" – 3:44
10. "Walk Away" – 3:49
11. "How Many Miles Must We March" – 3:07
12. "Welcome to the Cruel World" – 5:36
13. "I'll Rise" (lyrics: Maya Angelou; music: Harper) – 3:35
  - Contains the hidden track "...By and By I'm Going to See the King" (Blind Willie Johnson) – 0:30
  - "Remember" (unreleased version; bonus track) – 2:49

== Personnel ==
Musicians

- Ben Harper – vocals, acoustic guitar, Weissenborn guitar, dobro
- Richard Cook – Uilleann pipes on "Pleasure and Pain"
- Rock Deadrick – percussion, drums, backing vocals
- Tom Freund
- Suzie Katayama – cello on "Pleasure and Pain"
- John McKnight – bass guitar, accordion on "Mama's Got a Girlfriend Now"
- Tommy D. Daugherty – drum programming
- Gail Deadrick – piano on "I'll Rise"
- Clabe Hangan, Clarence Butler, John Taylor, Kenneth McDaniel, Clyde Allen, Jelanie Jones, Kevin Williams – backing vocals

Production

- Producers: Ben Harper, J.P. Plunier
- Associate producer: Jeff Gottlieb, Mikal Reid
- Engineer: Mikal Reid
- Assistant engineer: Bradley Cook
- Mixing: Mikal Reid
- Mastering: Eddy Schreyer
- Advisor: Ben Elder
- Art direction: Tom Dolan, J.P. Plunier
- Research: Ben Elder
- Photography: Jeff Gottlieb

== Charts ==
Chart performance for Welcome to the Cruel World
Chart (1998)	Peak position
Australian Albums Chart	94
French Albums Chart	11

== Certifications ==
Certifications for Welcome to the Cruel World
Region	Certification	Certified units/sales
Australia (ARIA)	Gold	35,000^{^}
Canada (Music Canada)	Gold	50,000^{^}
France (SNEP)	Platinum	300,000^{*}
United States (RIAA)	Gold	500,000^{‡}
^{*} Sales figures based on certification alone.^{^} Shipments figures based on certification alone.^{‡} Sales+streaming figures based on certification alone.
