= Songs for Tibet: The Art of Peace =

Songs for Tibet

Compilation album by Various artists
- Released: August 5, 2008 iTunes Store (download); August 12, 2008 CD
- Genre: Acoustic, rock
- Producer: The Art of Peace Foundation

Songs for Tibet: The Art of Peace is a music album with contributions from a number of musicians from throughout the world, including the United States, the United Kingdom, Canada, and South Africa. The artists include Sting, Garbage, Rush, Suzanne Vega, Jonatha Brooke, and Alanis Morissette. The album is an initiative to support Tibet, the promotion of peace, basic fundamental human rights, including freedom of speech and religion and the 14th Dalai Lama, Tenzin Gyatso. Songs for Tibet is a project from the Art of Peace Foundation in Washington, D.C. The executive director of the Art of Peace Foundation, Michael Wohl, is executive producer of the album. Producer Rupert Hine oversaw the musical direction of the project.

Songs for Tibet was released to coincide with the start of the Beijing 2008 Summer Olympics on August 8, 2008. The album was released on iTunes August 5, 2008, and the CD was made available August 19.

On August 5, 2008, the Art of Peace Foundation released the video "Songs for Tibet: Freedom Is Expression," which was directed by Mark Pellington. The video can be seen on YouTube and on the Art of Peace Foundation's website.

Songs for Tibet was the No. 1 Rock Album on iTunes in the United States, France, Canada, Italy, and the Netherlands. The producer of the album, the Art of Peace Foundation, alleged that China had blocked its residents from the iTunes Music Store after the album became a hit. The track "Hope" by Rush was nominated for Best Rock Instrumental Performance at the 2008 Grammy Awards.

== Track listing ==
Disc one
| No. | Title | Writer(s) | Performer | Length |
|---|---|---|---|---|
| 1. | "Hide & Seek 2" | Heap | Imogen Heap | 4:08 |
| 2. | "Send Your Love" (Art of Peace mix) | Sting | Sting | 4:47 |
| 3. | "Versions of Violence" (recorded in dressing room in Cologne) | Morissette, Sigsworth | Alanis Morissette | 4:17 |
| 4. | "Belief" | Mayer | John Mayer | 3:44 |
| 5. | "Better" (piano & voice) | Spektor | Regina Spektor | 3:08 |
| 6. | "We Are All Made of Stars" (2008) | Moby | Moby | 4:04 |
| 7. | "Making Noise" | | Damien Rice & The Cheshire Project | 4:05 |
| 8. | "More Than This" (Campfire take) | Carlton | Vanessa Carlton | 4:49 |
| 9. | "Nothing Fades" (Kosen Rufu version) | Sheik | Duncan Sheik | 4:28 |
| 10. | "Where Are You Going" (live in Copenhagen) | Matthews | Dave Matthews & Tim Reynolds | 4:03 |

Disc two
| No. | Title | Writer(s) | Performer | Length |
|---|---|---|---|---|
| 1. | "Song of Sand" (Great City version) | Vega | Suzanne Vega | 3:09 |
| 2. | "All the Good in This Life" | Garbage | Garbage | 4:20 |
| 3. | "Hope" (live for The Art of Peace) | Alex Lifeson | Rush | 2:23 |
| 4. | "Madonna on the Curb" (Peace mix) | | Jonatha Brooke | 3:33 |
| 5. | "In These Times" (The Concord mix) | Joan Armatrading | Joan Armatrading | 3:10 |
| 6. | "All My Mistakes" | Jeff Cohen, Alex Ejsmont, Teitur | Teitur feat. Tarira | 3:58 |
| 7. | "Alive in the World" | Browne | Jackson Browne | 4:11 |
| 8. | "Better Way" (live in Six-Fours-Les-Plage) | Harper | Ben Harper | 5:00 |
| 9. | "The Heart of the Matter" (Underlying mix) | Hine | Rupert Hine | 5:04 |
| 10. | "To Heal (And Restore Broken Bodies)" | Karl Hyde, Rick Smith | Underworld | 4:58 |
