= Both Sides of the Gun =

Studio album by Ben Harper
- Released: March 21, 2006
- Studio: The Boat Studios, Silver Lake, California
- Length: 63:51
- Label: Virgin
- Producer: Ben Harper

Ben Harper chronology
Live at the Apollo (2005)	Both Sides of the Gun (2006)	Lifeline (2007)

Professional ratings
Review scores
Source	Rating
AllMusic	link
Rolling Stone	link

Both Sides of the Gun is the seventh album by Ben Harper, released in 2006. Split into two discs, the title suggests the two sides of Harper's musical persona. The first disc ("White") is made of mostly acoustic and string-driven songs hinted at on the last track ("She's Only Happy in the Sun") of Harper's previous album Diamonds On the Inside. The second disc ("Black") is made up of the more rock-oriented material and touching on genres such as hard rock, funk and gospel.

A number of tracks were inspired by the political climate in the United States, particularly "Black Rain". The song criticizes President George W. Bush's handling of Hurricane Katrina, proclaiming, "Don't speak to us like we work for you / Selling false hope like some new dope we're addicted to / I'm not a desperate man but these are desperate times at hand / This generation is beyond your command."

The first disc opens with the ballad "Morning Yearning" and moving on to the Nick Drake-influenced solo guitar confessional "More Than Sorry" and the sentimental closer "Happy Everafter in Your Eyes", an ode to Harper's wife, actress Laura Dern.

The second half of "Both Sides" delves into a variety of styles, from the Black Crowes-style rock track "Get It Like You Like It" to the blues of "The Way You Found Me" and the largely instrumental jam "Serve Your Soul" that closes the album.

The album saw Harper playing the majority of the instruments on both discs; an approach that he had rarely used on his previous albums. However, his band, Innocent Criminals, would appear on a few tracks, while his later band, Relentless7, would appear together for the first time on "Serve Your Soul", the last track on the second disc.

The album became Harper's first US top 10 on the Billboard 200 albums chart, peaking at number seven. As of April 2007, it has sold 126,000 copies in United States.

== Track listing ==
All songs written by Ben Harper, except as indicated.

Disc 1 – "White"

1. "Morning Yearning" – 4:09
2. "Waiting for You" (Ben Harper, Michael Ward) – 3:34
3. "Picture in a Frame" (Ben Harper, Michael Ward, Juan Nelson, Oliver Charles, Jason Yates, Leon Mobley) – 4:36
4. "Never Leave Lonely Alone" – 2:51
5. "Sweet Nothing Serenade" – 2:44
6. "Reason to Mourn" – 4:26
7. "More Than Sorry" (Ben Harper, Danny Kalb) – 3:24
8. "Cryin' Won't Help You Now" – 2:35
9. "Happy Everafter in Your Eyes" – 2:31

Disc 2 – "Black"

1. "Better Way" – 3:58
2. "Both Sides of the Gun" – 2:44
3. "Engraved Invitation" – 2:55
4. "Black Rain" (Ben Harper, Jason Yates) – 2:57
5. "Gather 'Round the Stone" – 3:08
6. "Please Don't Talk About Murder While I'm Eating" – 2:34
7. "Get It Like You Like It" – 3:27
8. "The Way You Found Me" – 2:53
9. "Serve Your Soul" – 8:22

Disc 3 (special edition package only)

The album was also released as a limited special edition box set including a bonus CD featuring four alternate mixes and two live tracks.

1. "Gather 'Round the Stone" (alternate version mix)
2. "Reason to Mourn" (alternate mix)
3. "Get It Like You Like It" (live, acoustic)
4. "Waiting for You" (alternate mix)
5. "Morning Yearning" (alternate mix)
6. "Beloved One" (live)

== Personnel ==
- Ben Harper – vocals, slide guitar, acoustic guitar, Weissenborn, electric guitar, bass guitar, drums, percussion, piano, vibes, production
- Juan Nelson – bass
- Oliver Francis Charles – drums
- Leon Mobley – percussion
- Jason Yates – keys
- Matt Cory – bass
- Michael Ward – guitar, bass
- JP Plunier – drums
- Charlie Musselwhite – backing vocals
- David Lindley – tambura
- Greg Kurstin – Hammond B3
- Marc Ford – guitar
- Alyssa Park, Joel Pargman, Patrick Rosalez, Brett Banducci, Timothy Loo – strings
- David Palmer – keys
- Danny Kalb – guitar, sound engineer
- Jan Ghazi – electric guitar, backing vocals
- Nick Sandro – bass, backing vocals
- Jason Mozersky – guitar
- Scott Thomas – backing vocals
- Jose Medeles – drums
- Jesse Ingulls – bass
- Jordan Richardson – drums
- William Gus Seyffert – bass
- Ellen Harper, Sue Chase, Michelle Griepentrog, Jennifer Ohrstrom, Natasha Cockrell – backing vocals

== Charts ==
=== Weekly charts ===
Weekly chart performance for Both Sides of the Gun
Chart (2006)	Peak position
Australian Albums (ARIA)	1
Austrian Albums (Ö3 Austria)	47
Belgian Albums (Ultratop Flanders)	18
Belgian Albums (Ultratop Wallonia)	6
Canadian Albums (Billboard)	5
Dutch Albums (Album Top 100)	57
French Albums (SNEP)	2
German Albums (Offizielle Top 100)	90
Italian Albums (FIMI)	1
New Zealand Albums (RMNZ)	1
Norwegian Albums (VG-lista)	39
Portuguese Albums (AFP)	3
Spanish Albums (PROMUSICAE)	36
Swiss Albums (Schweizer Hitparade)	2
US Billboard 200	7
US Top Rock Albums (Billboard)	2

=== Year-end charts ===
Year-end chart performance for Both Sides of the Gun
Chart (2006)	Position
Australian Albums (ARIA)	63
Belgian Albums (Ultratop Wallonia)	76
French Albums (SNEP)	27
Swiss Albums (Schweizer Hitparade)	83

== Certifications ==
Certifications for Both Sides of the Gun
Region	Certification	Certified units/sales
Australia (ARIA)	Platinum	70,000^{^}
Canada (Music Canada)	Gold	50,000^{^}
France (SNEP)	Platinum	200,000^{*}
New Zealand (RMNZ)	Platinum	15,000^{^}
Switzerland (IFPI Switzerland)	Gold	15,000^{^}
^{*} Sales figures based on certification alone.^{^} Shipments figures based on certification alone.
