= Lifeline (Ben Harper album) =

Studio album by Ben Harper & the Innocent Criminals
- Released: August 28, 2007
- Studios: Gang Studios, Paris
- Genres: Rock; blues rock; pop rock; alternative rock; rhythm and blues; folk rock
- Length: 40:54
- Label: Virgin
- Producer: Ben Harper

Ben Harper & the Innocent Criminals chronology
Both Sides of the Gun (2006)	Lifeline (2007)	White Lies for Dark Times (2009)

Singles from Lifeline
- 1. "Fight Outta You" Released: 2007; 2. "In the Colors" Released: 2008; 3. "Fool for a Lonesome Train" Released: 2008

Ben Harper discussing Lifeline in 2007

Lifeline is an album by Ben Harper & the Innocent Criminals. It was recorded in Paris in the fall of 2006 after the lengthy European leg of the Both Sides of the Gun tour. Harper and the Innocent Criminals wrote the tracks while on tour and would rehearse the songs during sound checks while at each venue. Recorded in only seven days on analog, the album was released on August 28, 2007. It is Harper's eighth album. The recording process emphasized live performances and the use of analog recording equipment.

Lifeline debuted at number 9 on the US Billboard 200 chart, selling about 41,000 copies in its first week. As of November 2008, the album has sold 173,000 copies in the United States.

== Reception ==
Professional ratings
Review scores
Source	Rating
AllMusic	3.5/5 stars
The Brag	3/5 stars
Entertainment Weekly	B+
MusicOMH	4/5 stars
Okayplayer	4/5 stars
Rolling Stone	3.5/5 stars
Robert Christgau	(choice cut)

Rolling Stone said that Lifeline "mostly succeeds in warming ways, especially at the end." Thom Jurek at AllMusic described the album as "...a deeply focused, loose, and laid-back record that is musically compelling and deeply soulful, and contains some of Harper's finest songs to date".

== Track listing ==
All songs written by Ben Harper & The Innocent Criminals, except "Paris Sunrise #7" and "Lifeline" written by Ben Harper.

1. "Fight Outta You" – 4:10
2. "In the Colors" – 2:57
3. "Fool for a Lonesome Train" – 3:30
4. "Needed You Tonight" – 2:46
5. "Having Wings" – 3:27
6. "Say You Will" – 2:58
7. "Younger Than Today" – 3:24
8. "Put It on Me" – 3:30
9. "Heart of Matters" – 4:31
10. "Paris Sunrise #7" – 5:17
11. "Lifeline" – 4:28

== Personnel ==
- Ben Harper – guitars, vocals
- Juan Nelson – bass
- Oliver Charles – drums
- Michael Ward – guitar
- Jason Yates – keyboards
- Leon Mobley – percussion
- Michelle Haynes, Rovleta Fraser – backing vocals

== Charts ==
=== Weekly charts ===
Weekly chart performance for Lifeline
Chart (2007)	Peak position
Australian Albums (ARIA)	7
Belgian Albums (Ultratop Flanders)	13
Belgian Albums (Ultratop Wallonia)	6
Canadian Albums (Billboard)	3
Dutch Albums (Album Top 100)	75
French Albums (SNEP)	1
Italian Albums (FIMI)	1
New Zealand Albums (RMNZ)	6
Portuguese Albums (AFP)	5
Spanish Albums (Promusicae)	22
Swiss Albums (Schweizer Hitparade)	1
US Billboard 200	9
US Top Rock Albums (Billboard)	2

=== Year-end charts ===
2007 year-end chart performance for Lifeline
Chart (2007)	Position
French Albums (SNEP)	44
Swiss Albums (Schweizer Hitparade)	73

2008 year-end chart performance for Lifeline
Chart (2008)	Position
French Albums (SNEP)	152

== Certifications and sales ==
Certifications and sales for Lifeline
Region	Certification	Certified units/sales
Australia (ARIA)	Gold	35,000^{^}
France (SNEP)	Gold	200,000
Switzerland (IFPI Switzerland)	Gold	15,000^{^}
^{^} Shipments figures based on certification alone.
