= The Will to Live (Ben Harper album) =

Studio album by Ben Harper
- Released: June 17, 1997
- Genre: Alternative rock
- Length: 53:18
- Label: Virgin America
- Producer: Jean-Pierre Plunier

Ben Harper chronology
Fight for Your Mind (1995)	The Will to Live (1997)	Burn to Shine (1999)

Singles from The Will to Live
- 1. "Faded" Released: 1997; 2. "Jah Work" Released: 1997; 3. "Glory & Consequence" Released: 1997; 4. "Mama's Trippin'" Released: 1998

Professional ratings
Review scores
Source	Rating
AllMusic	3.5/5 stars
Chicago Tribune	(favorable)
Christgau's Consumer Guide	(neither)
Los Angeles Times	3/4 stars
Pitchfork Media	7.2/10
Rolling Stone	(mixed)

The Will to Live is a 1997 album by Ben Harper, which showed his continuing folk-centric focus, while at the same time expanding on his rock talents. This was his third album, his second with the Innocent Criminals (uncredited), and was packaged with a special bonus CD in certain countries.

The album would yield Harper's first UK Singles Chart single, "Faded". To date, it remains his only UK single entry.

== Track listing ==
All songs written by Ben Harper, except as noted.

1. "Faded" – 4:48
2. "Homeless Child" – 3:51
3. "Number Three" – 1:43
4. "Roses from My Friends" – 6:23
5. "Jah Work" – 4:54
6. "I Want to Be Ready" – 4:02
7. "The Will to Live" – 4:57
8. "Ashes" – 3:52
9. "Widow of a Living Man" – 4:10
10. "Glory & Consequence" – 5:40
11. "Mama's Trippin'" (Harper, Jean-Pierre Plunier) – 3:45
12. "I Shall Not Walk Alone" – 5:13

== Personnel ==
=== Musicians ===
Ben Harper & The Innocent Criminals

- Ben Harper – vocals, guitars, Weissenborns, saz
- Juan Nelson – bass; background vocals (11)
- Dean Butterworth – drums

Guest musicians

- Alan Anderson – guitar (1, 5)
- Eric Person – saxophone (8, 11)
- Patrick Brayer – fiddle (10, 12); mandolin (8)
- Rock Deadrick – percussion (2, 5, 11)
- Agnes Baddoo – background vocals (6)
- Amy Piatt – background vocals (6–8)
- String quartet (4):
  - Danielle Charles – violin
  - Brett Banducci – viola
  - Emily Wright – cello
  - Louis Allen – bass

=== Production ===
- Producer: J.P. Plunier
- Engineer: Todd Burke
- Assistant engineers: Erica Stephenson, Dann Thompson, Peter Doell
- Mixing: Eric Sarafin
- Mastering: Dave Collins
- Art direction: J.P. Plunier
- Design: Flavia Cureteu
- Photography: Annalisa, J.P. Plunier

== Charts ==
Chart performance for The Will to Live
Chart (1997)	Peak position
Australian Albums (ARIA)	17
Belgian Albums (Ultratop Flanders)	24
Belgian Albums (Ultratop Wallonia)	33
Canada Top Albums/CDs (RPM)	75
French Albums (SNEP)	4
New Zealand Albums (RMNZ)	1
Swiss Albums (Schweizer Hitparade)	37
UK Albums (Official Charts)	87
US Billboard 200	89

== Certifications ==
Certifications for The Will to Live
Region	Certification	Certified units/sales
Australia (ARIA)	Platinum	70,000^{^}
Canada (Music Canada)	Gold	50,000^{^}
France (SNEP)	Platinum	300,000^{*}
Italy (FIMI)	Gold	50,000^{*}
New Zealand (RMNZ)	Platinum	15,000^{^}
^{*} Sales figures based on certification alone.^{^} Shipments figures based on certification alone.
