= White Lies for Dark Times =

Studio album by Ben Harper and Relentless7
- Released: May 5, 2009
- Genre: Alternative rock, blues rock
- Length: 47:17
- Label: Virgin
- Producer: Ben Harper, Danny Kalb, Relentless7

Ben Harper chronology
Lifeline (2007)	White Lies for Dark Times (2009)	As I Call You Down (2010)

Professional ratings
Review scores
Source	Rating
AllMusic	4/5 stars
Okayplayer	86/100

White Lies for Dark Times is a blues-rock album by Ben Harper and Relentless7. It was released on May 5, 2009, and is Harper's first album with the Texas-based backing band Relentless7, and his ninth album overall.

== Track listing ==
White Lies for Dark Times track listing
No.	Title	Length
1.	"Number with No Name"	3:05
2.	"Up to You Now"	5:01
3.	"Shimmer & Shine"	3:06
4.	"Lay There & Hate Me"	4:14
5.	"Why Must You Always Dress In Black"	4:41
6.	"Skin Thin"	4:33
7.	"Fly One Time"	4:12
8.	"Keep It Together (So I Can Fall Apart)"	4:56
9.	"Boots Like These"	3:54
10.	"The Word Suicide"	5:04
11.	"Faithfully Remain"	4:28

Deluxe edition DVD
No.	Title	Length
12.	"Shimmer & Shine" (music video)	3:11
13.	"Documentary & Photo Gallery"

== Personnel ==
- Ben Harper – vocals, slide guitar
- Jason Mozersky – guitar
- Jesse Ingalls – bass guitar
- Jordan Richardson – drums

== Charts ==
Chart performance for White Lies for Dark Times
Chart (2009)	Peak position
Australian Albums (ARIA)	17
Austrian Albums (Ö3 Austria)	68
Belgian Albums (Ultratop Flanders)	60
Belgian Albums (Ultratop Wallonia)	11
French Albums (SNEP)	6
Italian Albums (FIMI)	7
New Zealand Albums (RMNZ)	11
Portuguese Albums (AFP)	23
Spanish Albums (PROMUSICAE)	53
Swiss Albums (Schweizer Hitparade)	7
US Billboard 200	9

== Certifications ==
Certifications for White Lies for Dark Times
Region	Certification	Certified units/sales
France (SNEP)	Gold	50,000^{*}
^{*} Sales figures based on certification alone.
