= Sheldon Gomberg =

American bassist, sound engineer and record producer

Sheldon Gomberg is an American record producer, audio engineer and bassist, who has worked with many artists including Ben Harper, Charlie Musselwhite, Warren Zevon, Rickie Lee Jones, Ryan Adams, Kenny Wayne Shepherd, Five for Fighting, Mandy Moore, k.d. lang, Fistful of Mercy, Victoria Williams, Ron Sexsmith, Lucinda Williams, Jackson Browne, Shelby Lynne, She & Him, The Living Sisters, Joseph Arthur, Plain White T's, Mark Eitzel, Steve Forbert, Ramsay Midwood, and more.

In 2014, he received a Grammy Award for his role as engineer, mixer, and co-producer of the Ben Harper with Charlie Musselwhite album, Get Up!.

The Five For Fighting album, America Town, that he played bass on sold platinum, and the song, "Superman" was also nominated for a Grammy Award in 2002.

The album, Timeless: Hank Williams Tribute, that he played upright bass on with Ryan Adams won the 2001 Grammy for Best Country Album.

Sheldon currently lives in Los Angeles, where he produces and records various artists.

== Discography ==
Partial list of credits:

- Ben Harper (with Charlie Musselwhite), Get Up! – Engineer, Mixer, Co-Producer
- Peter Case, HWY 62 – Producer, Engineer, Mixer
- Watkins Family Hour – Producer, Engineer, Mixer
- Eleni Mandell, Dark Lights Up – Producer, Engineer, Mixer
- The Living Sisters, Harmony Is Real: Songs For A Happy Holiday – Producer, Engineer, Mixer
- Rickie Lee Jones, The Devil You Know – Engineer, Mixer, Upright Bass, Producer
- Mark Eitzel, Don't Be A Stranger – Producer, Engineer, Mixer, Electric Bass, Upright Bass
- Steve Forbert, Over With You – Engineer, Mixer, Electric Bass, Upright Bass
- Warren Zevon, My Ride's Here – Electric Bass, Upright Bass
- Ryan Adams, Demolition – Electric Bass
- Ryan Adams, Timeless: Hank Williams Tribute – Upright Bass
- Rickie Lee Jones, Duchess Of Coolsville An Anthology – Electric Bass
- Rickie Lee Jones, Party of Five Soundtrack – Electric Bass
- Rickie Lee Jones, Balm In Gilead – Engineer, Co-Producer
- Rickie Lee Jones, The Village – Engineer, Mixer
- Fistful Of Mercy, As I Call You Down – Upright Bass, Engineer, Mixing
- Five for Fighting, America Town – Electric Bass, Upright Bass
- Five For Fighting, Grammy Nominees 2002 – Electric Bass
- Mandy Moore, Coverage – Upright Bass
- The Creekdippers - Mystic Theater – Upright Bass
- Plain White T's, Wonders of the Younger – Engineer
- Warpaint, The Fool – Mix Assistant
- The Living Sisters, Love To Live – Electric Bass, Upright Bass, Producer, Engineer, Mixer
- Larry Goldings, In My Room – Engineer
- Grant-Lee Phillips, Virginia Creeper – Upright Bass
- Michael Penn, Mr. Hollywood Jr., 1947 – Bass
- Chris Spedding, Wayne Kramer Presents: Beyond Cyberpunk – Electric Bass
- Peter Himmelman, Imperfect World – Electric Bass
- Peter Himmelman, Unstoppable Forces – Electric Bass, Co-Producer
- Peter Himmelman, My Lemonade Stand – Electric Bass
- Peter Himmelman, Mission Of My Soul; The Best Of – Electric Bass
- Eleni Mandell, Thrill – Electric Bass, Upright Bass
- Eleni Mandell, Snakebite – Upright Bass
- Eleni Mandell, Artificial Fire – Engineer
- Eleni Mandell, Miracle Of Five – Engineer
- Grey DeLisle, Iron Flowers – Upright Bass
- Grey DeLisle, Graceful Ghost – Electric Bass, Upright Bass
- Grey DeLisle, Homewrecker – Electric Bass, Upright Bass
- Shivaree, Corrupt and Immoral Transmissions – Electric Bass
