= Steal My Kisses =

2000 single by Ben Harper and the Innocent Criminals

Single by Ben Harper and the Innocent Criminals

from the album Burn to Shine
- Released: February 28, 2000
- Length: 4:05
- Label: Virgin
- Songwriter: Ben Harper
- Producer: J.P. Plunier

Ben Harper and the Innocent Criminals singles chronology
"Forgiven" (2000)	"Steal My Kisses" (2000)	"With My Own Two Hands" (2002)

"Steal My Kisses" is a song by American music group Ben Harper and the Innocent Criminals from their album Burn to Shine. The beat of the song is formed with beatboxing by Rahzel. It was released in February 2000 through Virgin Records America as the album's fourth and final single.

"Steal My Kisses" peaked number 11 on the US Billboard Bubbling Under Hot 100 and topped the Billboard Triple-A chart for three weeks. It also charted in New Zealand, where it held the number-two position on the RIANZ Singles Chart for four nonconsecutive weeks, finished 2000 as the country's fifth-most-successful single, and received a platinum certification for sales and streaming figures exceeding 30,000 units.

== Music video ==
The music video for "Steal My Kisses" was directed by Ben Harper's producer/manager Jean-Pierre Plunier and features Harper driving to a beach where he and his bandmates socialize with a group of bikini-clad women.

== Track listings ==
Australian CD single

1. "Steal My Kisses" – 4:05
2. "Number Three" (live) – 3:10
3. "By My Side" (live) – 3:46

European maxi-CD single

1. "Steal My Kisses"
2. "Number Three" (live)
3. "By My Side" (live)
4. "Steal My Kisses" (Neptunes Beatbox mix)

== Charts ==
=== Weekly charts ===
Chart (2000)	Peak position
Canada Adult Contemporary (RPM)	29
New Zealand (Recorded Music NZ)	2
US Bubbling Under Hot 100 (Billboard)	11
US Adult Alternative Airplay (Billboard)	1
US Adult Pop Airplay (Billboard)	15

=== Year-end charts ===
Chart (2000)	Position
New Zealand (RIANZ)	5
US Adult Top 40 (Billboard)	37
US Triple-A (Billboard)	5

== Certifications ==
Region	Certification	Certified units/sales
New Zealand (RMNZ)	Platinum	30,000^{‡}
^{‡} Sales+streaming figures based on certification alone.

== Release history ==
Region	Date	Format(s)	Label(s)	Ref.
United States	February 28, 2000	Modern adult contemporary radio	Virgin	
United States	April 18, 2000	Contemporary hit radio	Virgin	
New Zealand	June 12, 2000	CD; cassette	Virgin	
