= Don't Give Up on Me Now =

"Don't Give Up on me Now"

Single by Ben Harper

from the album Give Till It's Gone
- Released: April 11, 2011
- Recorded: 2010
- Genre: Pop rock
- Length: 3:35
- Label: Vertigo
- Songwriters: Ben Harper, Jesse Ingalls, Jason Mozersky, Jordan Richardson

Ben Harper singles chronology
"Rock 'n' Roll Is Free" (2011)	"Don't Give Up on me Now" (2011)	"Walk Away" (2011)

"Don't Give Up on Me Now" is a song by the American pop rock singer Ben Harper. It was released as a single on April 11, 2011, by the label Virgin.

The song was written by Ben Harper together with Jason Mozersky and released as the second single from the album Give Till It's Gone. It was only released in Italy.

== Charts ==
Country	Peak position
Belgium (Ultratip Bubbling Under Wallonia)	18
