= Call It What It Is =

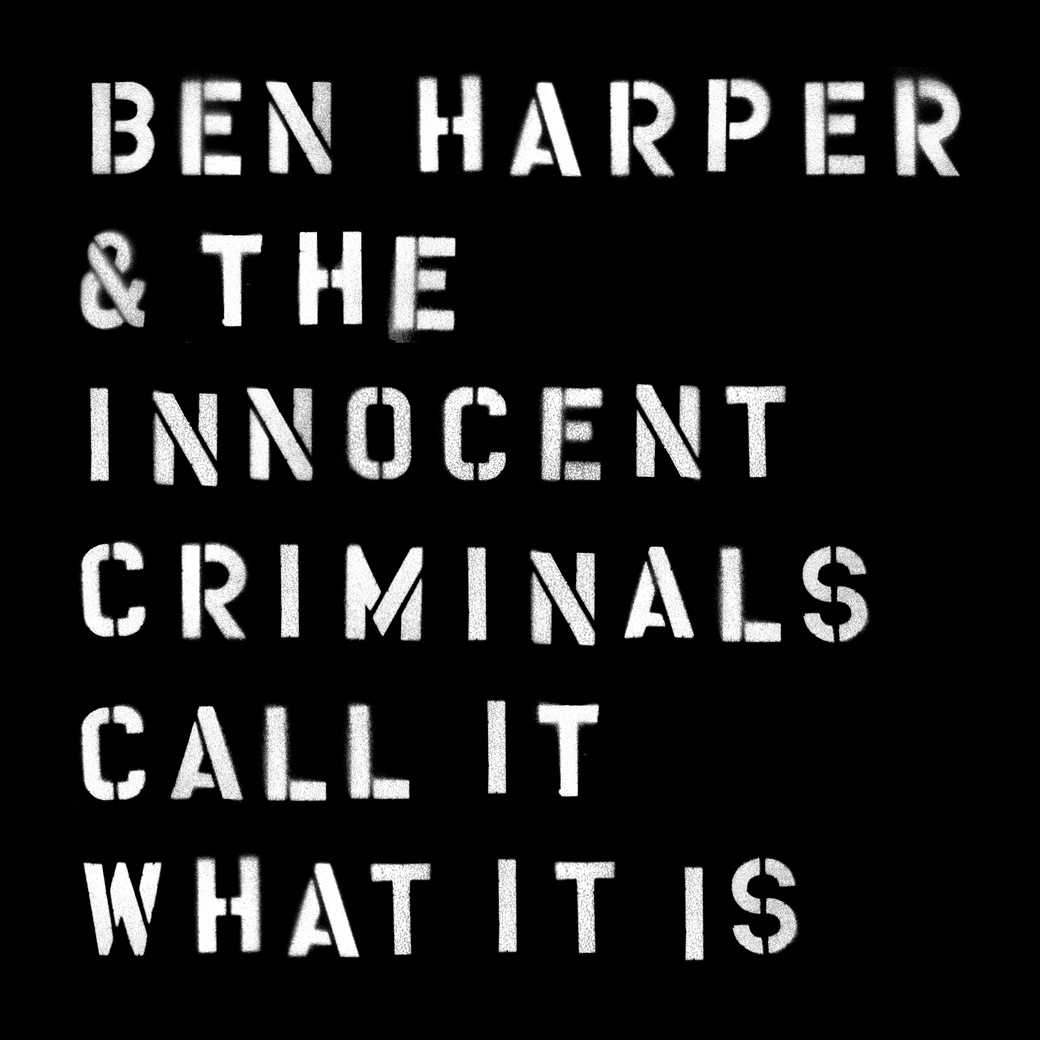

Studio album by Ben Harper & the Innocent Criminals
- Released: April 8, 2016
- Studio: The Village, Los Angeles, California
- Genre: Rock; blues rock; pop rock; alternative rock; rhythm and blues; folk rock
- Length: 40:50
- Label: Stax
- Producer: Ben Harper; Ethan Allen; Juan Nelson; Leon Mobley; Oliver Charles; Jason Yates; Michael Ward

Ben Harper & the Innocent Criminals chronology
Childhood Home (2014)	Call It What It Is (2016)	No Mercy in This Land (2018)

Call It What It Is is the thirteenth studio album by American artist Ben Harper (with The Innocent Criminals) released on April 8, 2016.

== Track listing ==
Call It What It Is track listing
No.	Title	Length
1.	"When Sex Was Dirty"	3:50
2.	"Deeper and Deeper"	4:02
3.	"Call It What It Is"	3:47
4.	"How Dark Is Gone"	3:38
5.	"Shine"	3:55
6.	"All That Has Grown"	3:25
7.	"Pink Balloon"	2:22
8.	"Finding Our Way"	4:15
9.	"Bones"	3:21
10.	"Dance Like Fire"	3:09
11.	"Goodbye to You"	5:06
Total length:		40:50

== Charts ==
=== Weekly charts ===
Weekly chart performance for Call It What It Is
Chart (2016)	Peak position
Australian Albums (ARIA)	11
Austrian Albums (Ö3 Austria)	58
Belgian Albums (Ultratop Flanders)	27
Belgian Albums (Ultratop Wallonia)	17
Canadian Albums (Billboard)	17
Dutch Albums (Album Top 100)	71
French Albums (SNEP)	5
German Albums (Offizielle Top 100)	97
Italian Albums (FIMI)	6
New Zealand Albums (RMNZ)	16
Portuguese Albums (AFP)	40
Swiss Albums (Schweizer Hitparade)	11
US Billboard 200	19
US Top Rock Albums (Billboard)	4

=== Year-end charts ===
Year-end chart performance for Call It What It Is
Chart (2016)	Position
Belgian Albums (Ultratop Wallonia)	131
French Albums (SNEP)	142
