= Winter Is for Lovers =

Studio album by Ben Harper
- Released: October 23, 2020
- Length: 31:45
- Label: Anti-

Ben Harper chronology
No Mercy in This Land (2018)	Winter Is for Lovers (2020)	Bloodline Maintenance (2022)

Winter Is For Lovers is an instrumental album by Ben Harper, released through Anti- on October 23, 2020. The only instrument on the album is a Monteleone lap steel guitar. Each track of the album is named for one of Harper's favorite places in the world.

== Track listing ==
Winter Is for Lovers track listing
No.	Title	Length
1.	"Istanbul"	1:48
2.	"Manhattan"	3:10
3.	"Joshua Tree"	3:57
4.	"Inland Empire"	3:27
5.	"Harlem"	2:28
6.	"Lebanon"	0:31
7.	"London"	2:10
8.	"Toronto"	1:57
9.	"Verona"	1:34
10.	"Brittany"	0:48
11.	"Montreal"	1:47
12.	"Bizanet"	2:49
13.	"Toronto (Reprise)"	0:37
14.	"Islip"	1:49
15.	"Paris"	3:03
Total length:		31:45

== Charts ==
Chart performance for Winter Is for Lovers
Chart (2020)	Peak position
Belgian Albums (Ultratop Wallonia)	65
French Albums (SNEP)	67
Italian Albums (FIMI)	73
Swiss Albums (Schweizer Hitparade)	66
