= Childhood Home =

Studio album by Ben & Ellen Harper
- Released: May 6, 2014
- Studio: The Machine Shop, Santa Monica, California
- Genre: Folk rock; blues rock; Americana
- Length: 33:47
- Label: Prestige Folklore
- Producer: Ben Harper; Ethan Allan; Jason Mozersky; Jesse Ingalls; Jimmy Paxson

Ben Harper chronology
Get Up! (2013)	Childhood Home (2014)	Call It What It Is (2016)

Professional ratings
Review scores
Source	Rating
AllMusic	3.5/5 stars

Childhood Home is the twelfth studio album by American musician Ben Harper, released on May 6, 2014, under Prestige Folklore. It is a collaboration with his mother, Ellen Harper.

== Reception ==
The album debuted at No. 43 on the US Billboard 200, and No. 3 on the US Folk Albums chart, selling around 7,000 copies in its first week. The album has sold 23,000 copies in the United States as of March 2016.

== Track listing ==
All tracks composed by Ben Harper; except where indicated

Childhood Home track listing
No.	Title	Writer(s)	Length
1.	"A House Is a Home"		2:43
2.	"City of Dreams"	Ellen Harper	3:42
3.	"Born to Love You"		3:30
4.	"Heavyhearted World"		2:57
5.	"Farmer's Daughter"	Ellen Harper	3:15
6.	"Memories of Gold"		3:48
7.	"Altar of Love"	Ellen Harper	3:21
8.	"Break Your Heart"	Ellen Harper	3:41
9.	"Learn It All Again Tomorrow"		3:03
10.	"How Could We Not Believe"		3:47
Total length:			33:47

== Charts ==
Chart performance for Childhood Home
Chart (2014)	Peak position
Australian Albums (ARIA)	40
Belgian Albums (Ultratop Flanders)	64
Belgian Albums (Ultratop Wallonia)	38
French Albums (SNEP)	38
Italian Albums (FIMI)	8
New Zealand Albums (RMNZ)	14
Spanish Albums (PROMUSICAE)	99
Swiss Albums (Schweizer Hitparade)	30
US Billboard 200	43
US Americana/Folk Albums (Billboard)	3
US Top Rock Albums (Billboard)	12
US Indie Store Album Sales (Billboard)	5
