= No Mercy in This Land =

Studio album by Ben Harper and Charlie Musselwhite
- Released: March 30, 2018
- Studio: Village Studios, Santa Monica
- Genre: Southern soul
- Length: 35:03
- Label: Anti-
- Producer: Ethan Allen

Ben Harper chronology
Call It What It Is (2016)	No Mercy in This Land (2018)	Winter Is For Lovers (2020)

Charlie Musselwhite chronology
Get Up (2013)	No Mercy in This Land (2018)

Professional ratings
Aggregate scores
Source	Rating
Metacritic	70/100
Review scores
Source	Rating
AllMusic	3.5/5 stars

No Mercy in This Land is the fourteenth studio album by American artist Ben Harper and the twelfth studio album by the American electric blues harmonica player and bandleader Charlie Musselwhite released by Anti- on March 30, 2018.

== Track listing ==
All tracks composed by Ben Harper; except where indicated

No Mercy in This Land track listing
No.	Title	Writer(s)	Length
1.	"When I Go"	Harper, Jason Mozersky, Jesse Ingalls	3:45
2.	"Bad Habits"		3:45
3.	"Love and Trust"		3:07
4.	"The Bottle Wins Again (Blues)"	Harper, Ingalls	3:38
5.	"Found the One"	Harper, Mozersky, Jimmy Paxson	2:47
6.	"When Love Is Not Enough"	Harper, Mozersky	4:09
7.	"Trust You to Dig My Grave"		3:33
8.	"No Mercy in This Land"		3:45
9.	"Movin' On"		3:02
10.	"Nothing at All"		3:37
Total length:			35:03

== Charts ==
Chart performance for No Mercy in This Land
Chart (2018)	Peak position
Australian Albums (ARIA)	60
Belgian Albums (Ultratop Flanders)	64
Belgian Albums (Ultratop Wallonia)	28
Dutch Albums (Album Top 100)	101
French Albums (SNEP)	6
German Albums (Offizielle Top 100)	51
Italian Albums (FIMI)	19
Spanish Albums (PROMUSICAE)	38
Swiss Albums (Schweizer Hitparade)	8
US Billboard 200	132
US Americana/Folk Albums (Billboard)	6
US Top Rock Albums (Billboard)	19
