= Get Up! (Ben Harper and Charlie Musselwhite album) =

Studio album by Ben Harper with Charlie Musselwhite
- Released: January 29, 2013
- Genre: Blues rock
- Length: 40:27
- Label: Stax
- Producers: Ben Harper; Sheldon Gomberg; Chris Goldsmith; Jason Mozersky; Jesse Ingalls; Jordan Richardson

Ben Harper chronology
Give Till It's Gone (2011)	Get Up! (2013)	Childhood Home (2014)

Charlie Musselwhite chronology
Juke Joint Chapel (2012)	Get Up (2013)

Get Up! is an album by the American musicians Charlie Musselwhite and Ben Harper, their twenty-ninth and eleventh albums, respectively. It was released in January 2013 under Stax Records. In 2019, the song "You Found Another Lover (I Lost Another Friend)" was certified Gold by the RIAA.

The album won a Grammy Award for Best Blues Album in 2014.

== Reception ==
Professional ratings
Aggregate scores
Source	Rating
Metacritic	79/100
Review scores
Source	Rating
AllMusic	4/5 stars
Rolling Stone	3.5/5 stars

The album has been given a Metacritic score of 79 out of 100 based on 9 reviews, indicating generally favorable reviews.

The album entered the Billboard 200 at No. 27 on its release in the United States. It also debuted at No. 1 on the Blues Albums chart.

== Track listing ==
All tracks composed by Ben Harper; With additional contributors noted

Get Up! track listing
No.	Title	Writer(s)	Length
1.	"Don't Look Twice"		3:12
2.	"I'm In, I'm Out, I'm Gone"	Jason Mozersky	4:36
3.	"We Can't End This Way"		3:34
4.	"I Don't Believe a Word You Say"		3:16
5.	"You Found Another Lover (I Lost Another Friend)"		4:12
6.	"I Ride at Dawn"	Jesse Ingalls	4:41
7.	"Blood Side Out"	Mozersky	2:51
8.	"Get Up!"	Ingalls	6:16
9.	"She Got Kick"	Mozersky	2:56
10.	"All That Matters Now"	Mozersky	4:53

iTunes deluxe version
No.	Title	Length
11.	"Don't Look Twice" (The Machine Shop Session)	3:04
12.	"All That Matters Now" (The Machine Shop Session)	5:37
13.	"You Found Another Lover (I Lost Another Friend)" (The Machine Shop Session)	4:21
14.	"I'm In, I'm Out, I'm Gone" (The Machine Shop Session)	6:57
15.	"I Don't Believe a Word You Say" (The Machine Shop Session)	3:23

== Charts ==
=== Weekly charts ===
Weekly chart performance for Get Up!
Chart (2013)	Peak position
Australian Albums (ARIA)	44
Belgian Albums (Ultratop Flanders)	89
Belgian Albums (Ultratop Wallonia)	53
Dutch Albums (Album Top 100)	56
French Albums (SNEP)	13
German Albums (Offizielle Top 100)	91
Italian Albums (FIMI)	16
New Zealand Albums (RMNZ)	30
Spanish Albums (Promusicae)	82
Swiss Albums (Schweizer Hitparade)	55
UK Jazz & Blues Albums (Official Charts)	5
US Billboard 200	27
US Top Blues Albums (Billboard)	1
US Top Rock Albums (Billboard)	10
US Indie Store Album Sales (Billboard)	4
US Vinyl Albums (Billboard)	9

=== Year-end charts ===
Year-end chart performance for Get Up!
Chart (2013)	Position
French Albums (SNEP)	171
US Top Blues Albums (Billboard)	4
