= Burn to Shine (album) =

Studio album by Ben Harper and the Innocent Criminals
- Released: September 21, 1999
- Genres: Alternative rock, blues rock, soul
- Length: 54:29
- Label: Virgin Records America
- Producer: Jean-Pierre Plunier

Ben Harper and the Innocent Criminals chronology
| The Will to Live (1997) | Burn to Shine (1999) | Live from Mars (2001) |

Singles from Burn to Shine
- 1. "Please Bleed" Released: 1999; 2. "Burn to Shine" Released: 1999; 3. "Forgiven" Released: 2000; 4. "Steal My Kisses" Released: 2000

Burn to Shine is an album by Ben Harper and the Innocent Criminals, released in 1999 on Virgin Records America. Harper's fourth album, it shows him working within many different genres, including blues, rock, soul, and folk. The songs "Steal My Kisses" and "Suzie Blue" became successful on college radio. Like most other Harper albums, different versions were released in different regions with varying bonus material.

== Critical reception ==
Professional ratings
Review scores
| Source | Rating |
|---|---|
| AllMusic | 4/5 stars |
| Pitchfork | 6.0/10 |
| Rolling Stone | 2.5/5 stars |
| Spin | 7/10 |

The Washington Post wrote that "while the songs are seldom as interesting as the album's textured instrumental weave, Harper deserves credit for trying to break free of the cliches that have a stranglehold on the blues." Entertainment Weekly considered the album to be "mostly made up of leaden rootsy excursions." The Hartford Courant wrote that the album tackled "an overload of musical niches." Trouser Press called Harper "a thinking man's Lenny Kravitz".

== Track listing ==
All songs written by Ben Harper.

1. "Alone" – 3:58
2. "The Woman in You" – 5:41
3. "Less" – 4:05
4. "Two Hands of a Prayer" – 7:50
5. "Please Bleed" – 4:37
6. "Suzie Blue" – 4:29
7. "Steal My Kisses" – 4:05
8. "Burn to Shine" – 3:34
9. "Show Me a Little Shame" – 3:44
10. "Forgiven" – 5:17
11. "Beloved One" – 4:03
12. "In the Lord's Arms" – 3:06

== Personnel ==
=== Musicians ===
The Innocent Criminals

- Ben Harper – vocals, guitars
- Juan Nelson – bass
- Dean Butterworth – drums
- David Leach – percussion

Guest musicians

- Tyrone Downie – keyboards (2, 9)
- Eric Sarafin – harmonium (4), piano (11)
- The Real Time Jazz Band (6):
  - Michael Fay – banjo
  - Bruce Bishop – guitar
  - David Firman – bass
  - Jim Leigh – trombone
  - Jim Bogen – clarinet
  - Richard Barnes – washboard
- Nick Rich – human beatbox (7)
- Suzie Katayama – string arrangement, cello (11)
- Joel Derouin – first violin (11)
- Eve Butler – second violin (11)
- Matt Funes – viola (11)
- Jon Clarke – oboe, English horn (11)
- David Lindley – banjo, mandolin, fiddle (12)

=== Production ===
- Producer: J.P. Plunier
- Engineers: Eric Sarafin, Dan Steinberg
- Assistant engineer: Dan Steinberg
- Mixing: Eric Sarafin
- Mixing assistant: Steve Gamberoni, Geoff Walcha
- Mastering: Dave Collins
- Art direction: J.P. Plunier
- Design: Tom Dolan, Mike King, J.P. Plunier
- Photography: Annalisa
- Illustrations: Mike King
- Weissenborn research: Ben Elder

== Charts ==
Chart performance for Burn to Shine
| Chart (1999) | Peak position |
|---|---|
| Australian Albums (ARIA) | 2 |
| Belgian Albums (Ultratop Wallonia) | 42 |
| Canada Top Albums/CDs (RPM) | 21 |
| French Albums (SNEP) | 2 |
| New Zealand Albums (RMNZ) | 5 |
| Swiss Albums (Schweizer Hitparade) | 34 |
| UK Albums (Official Charts) | 82 |
| US Billboard 200 | 67 |

== Certifications ==
Certifications for Burn to Shine
| Region | Certification | Certified units/sales |
|---|---|---|
| Australia (ARIA) | Platinum | 70,000^{^} |
| Canada (Music Canada) | Gold | 50,000^{^} |
| France (SNEP) | Platinum | 300,000^{*} |
| New Zealand (RMNZ) | Platinum | 15,000^{^} |
| United States (RIAA) | Gold | 500,000^{^} |
^{*} Sales figures based on certification alone.^{^} Shipments figures based on certification alone.
