= Relentless7 =

American rock band

- Also known as: Ben Harper and Relentless7, R7
- Origin: Los Angeles, California, U.S.
- Genres: Rock blues
- Years active: 2008–2010
- Label: Virgin
- Past members: Ben Harper; Jesse Ingalls; Jason Mozersky; Jordan Richardson
- Website: relentless7.com

Relentless7 was an American rock band, formed in 2008 by singer/guitarist Ben Harper. The band was composed of Harper (guitar, lead vocals), Jason Mozersky (lead guitar), Jesse Ingalls (bass), and Jordan Richardson (drums).

== History ==
Ben Harper formed Relentless7 with guitarist Jason Mozersky after discovering and eventually touring with Mozersky’s former band, Wan Santo Condo. Harper discovered Wan Santo Condo though lead singer Bob Via, who at the time was working for an Austin music promoter and was chauffeuring Harper to a gig. Bob convinced Harper to listen to his band’s demo, which impressed him so much it ultimately led to a record contract with Everloving Records, as well as the collaboration with Mozersky.

When Harper recruited Mozersky for his album Both Sides of the Gun, Mozersky suggested his friends Jesse Ingalls and Jordan Richardson, then members of the Austin-come-L.A. band Oliver Future. The resulting sessions yielded the track "Serve Your Soul", and were the genesis of Relentless7.

Relentless7 released their only album, White Lies for Dark Times on May 5, 2009. The group made its public debut at a "Get Out The Vote" benefit show on October 29, 2008 in Youngstown, Ohio along with the Beastie Boys, Crosby, Stills, Nash, & Young, and Tenacious D. On March 23, 2009, they appeared on NBC's Last Call with Carson Daly to announce the album release and their upcoming tour, performing the single "Shimmer and Shine".

On April 4, 2009, Relentless7 played with Ringo Starr, Donovan, and Eddie Vedder at Change Begins Within, a benefit concert organized by David Lynch.

In April 2009, the band began a worldwide tour to promote their new album, quickly selling out (as the headline band) such notable venues as Variety Playhouse in Atlanta on 5/2; 9:30 Club in Washington, D.C., where the show sold out before it was announced, Phoenix Concert Theatre in Toronto (5/13); the Fillmore in San Francisco (5/27); Webster Hall in New York City; The Vic Theatre in Chicago (5/16), and Sydney Metro theatre in Australia, headlined Bluesfest, Byron Bay Australia. The band also appeared at the London Forum; a birthday tribute to Pete Seeger at Madison Square Garden; the South by Southwest Festival; Le Printemps de Bourges in France; New Orleans Jazz Festival; the Beale Street Music Festival, and several other venues in the U.S., Canada, Europe, and Australia. They performed on Earth Day 2009 (4/22) in Rome at Piazza del Popolo, and headlined the All Good Music Festival on July 11. Relentless7 was also featured at Halloweenabaloo on October 31, 2009 at Union Station. Harper started out the performance playing solo, followed by songs with a string quartet, and played with Relentless7 to end the show. Linda Perry played beforehand.

Relentless7 played alongside Ringo Starr on the January 12, 2010 episode of Late Night with Jimmy Fallon, and the January 13, 2010 episode of The Daily Show. Their Live from the Montreal International Jazz Festival CD/DVD set was released later that year. The final Relentless7 show to date took place at the Life Is Good festival in September 2010.

== Reviews and reception ==
White Lies for Dark Times was favorably previewed in Rolling Stone's "Spring Music Preview: Inside 45 of the Year's Biggest Albums" and The Austin Chronicle. It was released on May 5, 2009, debuting at #9 on the Billboard 200.
