= Leon Mobley =

American musician (born 1961)

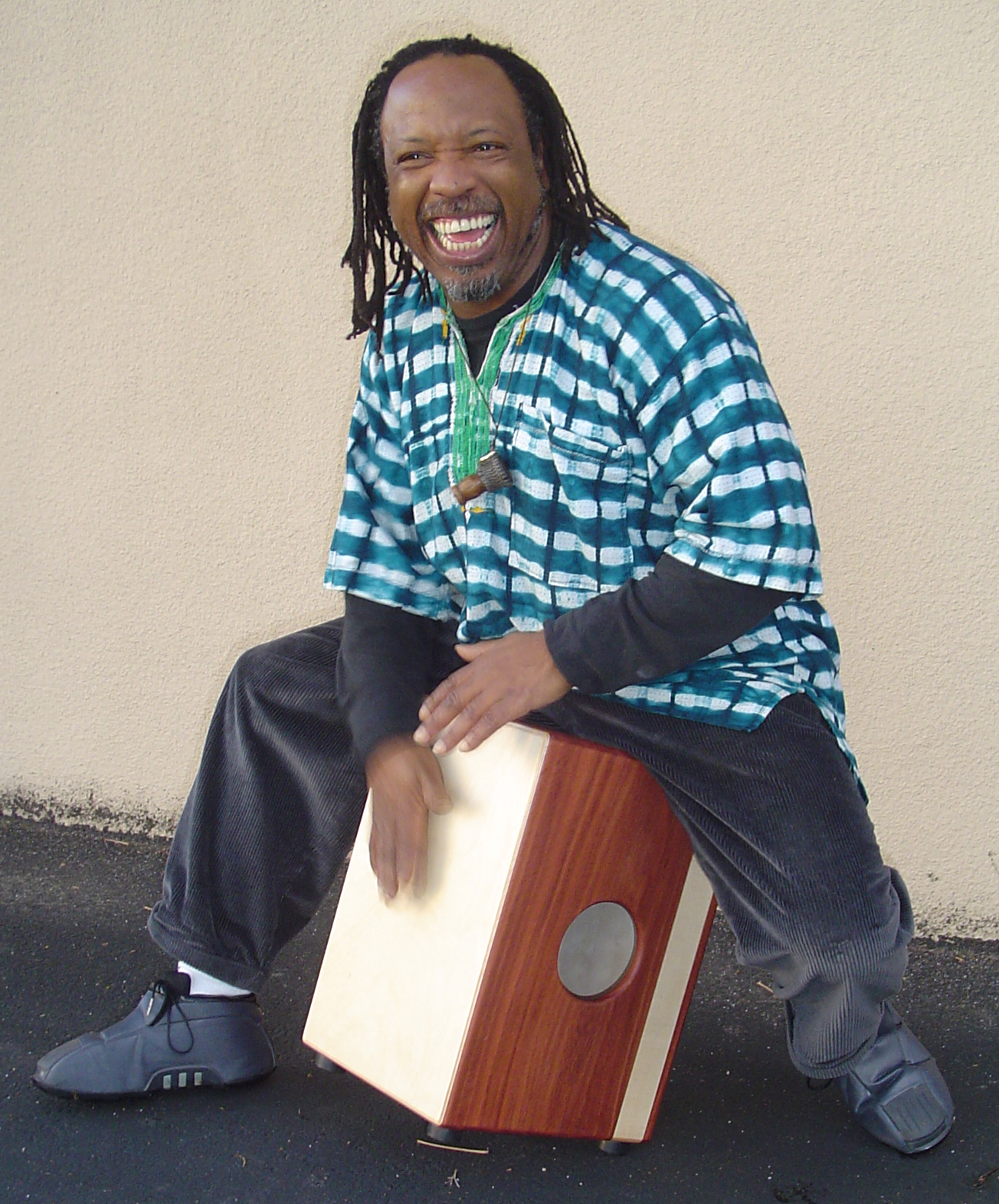

Background information
- Born: February 27, 1961 (age 65); Massachusetts, U.S.
- Genres: African music, reggae, rock, folk
- Occupations: Musician, actor
- Instruments: percussion, drums
- Labels: Virgin Records (with Ben Harper & The Innocent Criminals)

Leon Mobley (born February 27, 1961) is a percussionist and drummer. He is founder and artistic and musical director of Da Lion and Djimbe West African Drummers and Dancers, an actor, and a member of Grammy-winning band Innocent Criminals.

== History ==
Mobley was born in Massachusetts in 1961. He began playing African drums at the age of seven, and studied for 10 years under Nigerian master drummer Babatunde Olatunji at the Elma Lewis School of Fine Arts in Boston, Massachusetts. In 1977, he studied under Senegalese master drummer Ibrahim Camara (former drummer for the National Ballet of Senegal) while a member of the Bokan-Deye Dance Company.

He was a cast member in the PBS Television show ZOOM in 1973. After leaving ZOOM he worked with The Art of Black Dance and Music, and toured with a reggae band. He performed in the musical Dancing in the Street and studied music and education at the University of Massachusetts.

Mobley studied and performed in Surinam, South America, Trinidad and Tobago and throughout the West Indies, from 1979 to 1981. He continued his studies in Senegal and Gambia in 1982. In 1987 and 1992, he taught and performed West African drumming and dancing in Japan, where he participated in a cultural exchange program on Sado Island, the home of percussion group Kodo.

In Boston, Massachusetts, he taught at community centers, conducted school tours with the Art of Black Dance and Music, and conducted workshops at Berklee College of Music. He also worked as musical director at Paige Academy, a private school in Roxbury, Massachusetts. He founded and recorded six CDs with the group Leon Mobley and Da Lion.

Mobley was selected by the U.S. State Department to be an Art Envoy for an Arts Exchange Program, and he traveled and presented workshops and performances in Africa and South America. He has performed and lectured throughout the United States, produced recordings, conducted clinics, and performed with his group Da Lion.

He moved to Los Angeles in 1986 and continued teaching, conducting weekly classes at UCLA, Los Angeles Contemporary Dance Theater, Parks and Recreation, and the Los Angeles High School for the Arts on the campus of Cal State (Los Angeles).

He was invited to South Africa in 1991 to perform with returning exiles Letta Mbulu, Caiphus Semenya, and Hugh Masekela. He has toured the world as a drummer/percussionist with Ben Harper and the Innocent Criminals (1993–present). He worked with Damian Marley and Nas on a collaborative album, titled Distant Relatives, in 2010. He has recorded and performed with Michael Jackson, Quincy Jones, Mick Jagger, and Madonna.

Mobley is the founder and musical and artistic director of Da Lion and Djimbe West African Drummers and Dancers, a group he formed in 1986 in California to present authentic West African-American dance and music to North American audiences.
