= Weissenborn =

Slide guitars made by Hermann Weissenborn

- Company type: Private
- Industry: Musical instruments
- Founded: 1925
- Founder: Hermann Weissenborn
- Headquarters: Los Angeles
- Area served: Global
- Products: lap slide guitars

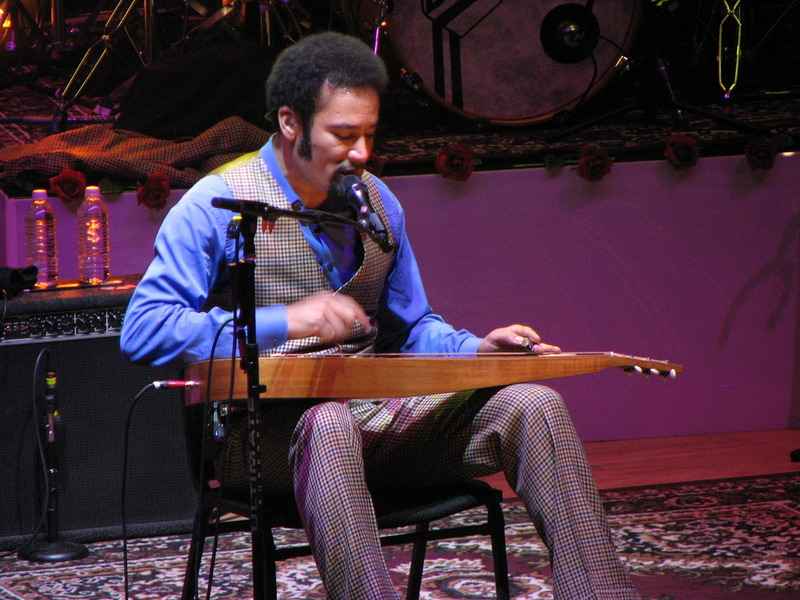
Ben Harper playing a Weissenborn in Toronto, Ontario

Weissenborn or H. Weissenborn is a brand of lap slide guitar manufactured by Hermann Weissenborn in Los Angeles in the 1920s and 1930s.

These instruments are now highly sought after, and form the base for most non-resonator acoustic lap steel guitars currently produced. It is estimated that fewer than 5,000 original instruments were produced, and it is unknown how many now survive. The signature feature of Weissenborn guitars is the hollow neck, effectively a highly adapted body chamber that runs the entire length of the body, making conventional playing completely impossible.

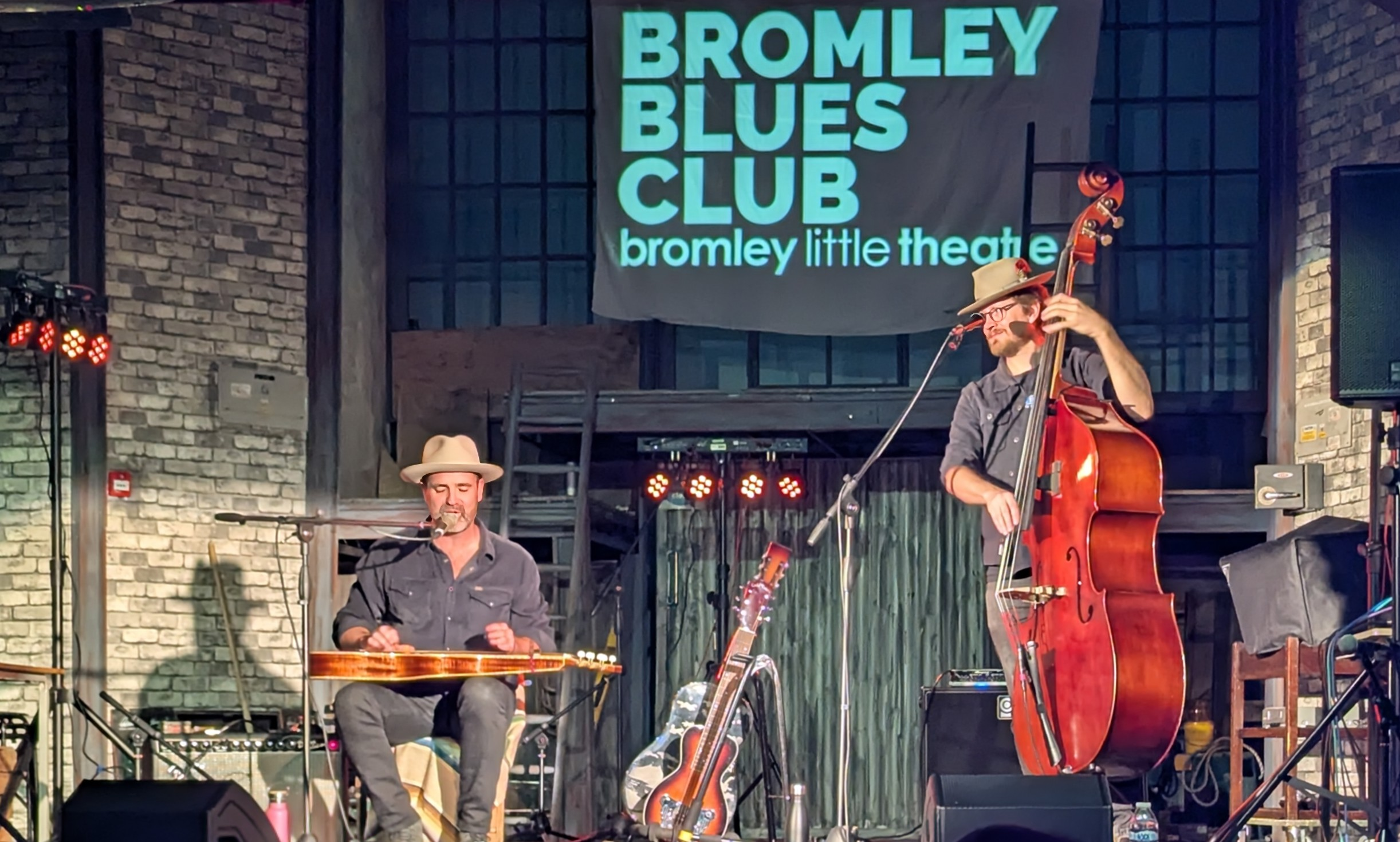
Martin Harley playing a Weissenborn

The name Weissenborn is now commonly used to describe this style of instrument in general, with H. Weissenborn and modern factory or luthier reproductions being referred to as Weissenborn or Weissenborn-style guitars.
