= Ben Harper =

American musician (born 1969)

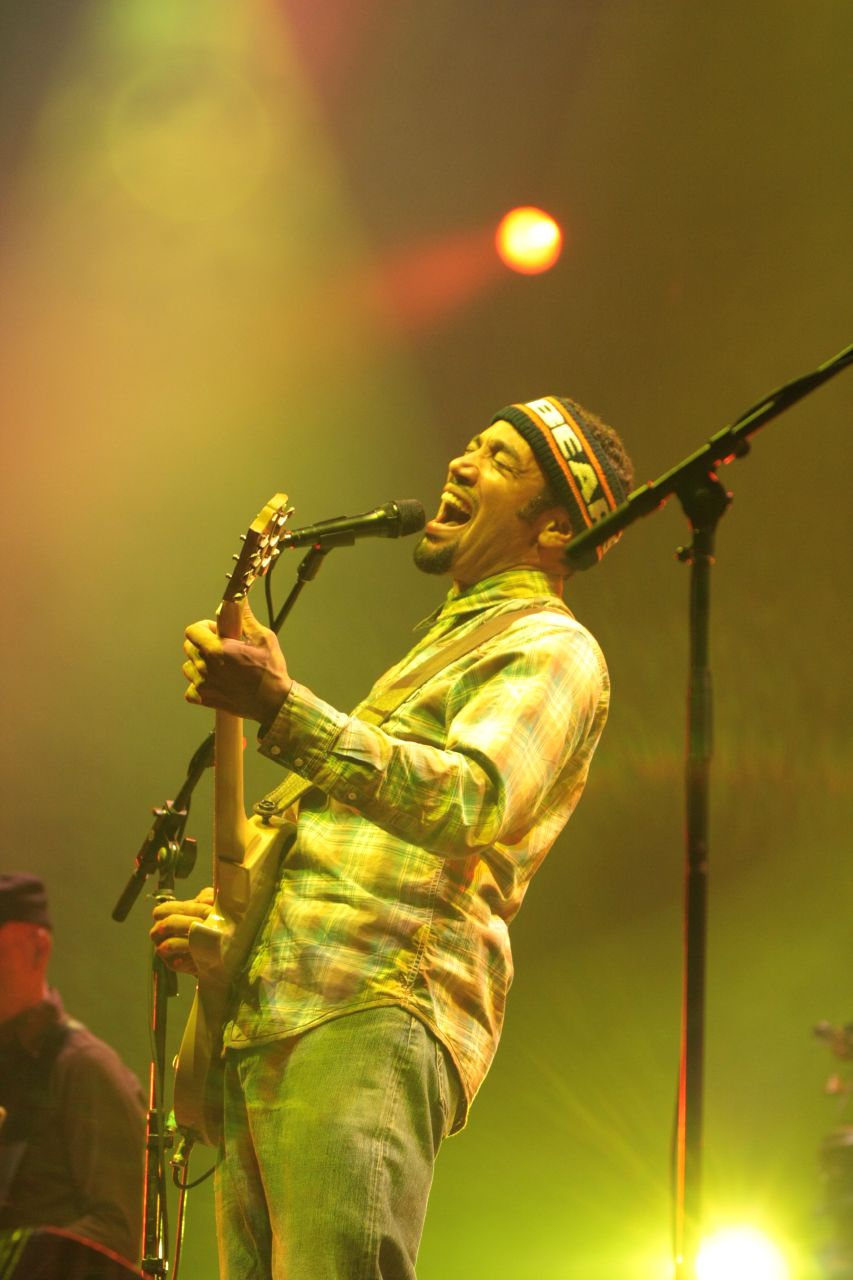
- Harper at the Eurockéennes in 2008

Background information
- Born: Benjamin Charles Harper; October 28, 1969 (age 56); Pomona, California, U.S.
- Genres: Folk rock; blues rock; alternative rock; soul; funk rock; gospel; reggae; jam rock
- Occupation: Musician
- Instruments: Vocals; guitar; lap steel guitar; slide guitar; keyboard instruments; piano; bass; drums; percussion; vibraphone
- Years active: 1992–present
- Labels: Virgin; EMI Records; Chrysalis
- Formerly of: Relentless7; Fistful of Mercy; The Innocent Criminals
- Spouses: Joanna (m. 1996; div. 2001); Laura Dern (m. 2005; div. 2013); Jaclyn Matfus (m. 2017)
- Website: www.benharper.com

Benjamin Charles Harper (born October 28, 1969) is an American singer-songwriter and multi-instrumentalist. Harper plays an eclectic mix of blues, folk, soul, reggae, and rock music, and he is known for his guitar-playing skills, vocals, live performances, and activism. He has released 12 studio albums, mostly through Virgin Records, and has toured internationally.

Harper is a three-time Grammy Award winner and seven-time nominee, with awards for Best Pop Instrumental Performance and Best Traditional Soul Gospel Album in 2004 and Best Blues Album in 2013.

At the 40th Blues Music Awards ceremony, Harper's joint composition with Charlie Musselwhite, "No Mercy in This Land", was named Song of the Year.

== Early life ==
Harper was born in Pomona, California. His late father, Leonard Harper, was of African-American ancestry, and his mother, Ellen Harper Verdries (née Chase), is Jewish. His maternal great-grandmother was a Russian-Lithuanian Jew. His parents divorced when he was five years old, and he grew up with his mother's family. Harper has two younger brothers, Joel and Peter Harper.

Harper began playing guitar as a child. His maternal grandparents' music store, the Folk Music Center and Museum (Claremont, CA), laid a foundation of folk and blues for the artist, complemented by regular patrons Leonard Cohen, Taj Mahal, John Darnielle, and David Lindley, and quotes of William Shakespeare and Robert Frost made often by his grandfather.

In 1978, at the age of 9, Harper attended Bob Marley's performance in Burbank, California, where Marley was joined by former bandmate Peter Tosh for the encore. It was, according to Harper, an important influence.

== Career ==
At the age of twelve, Harper played his first gig. During the 1980s, in his teen years, Harper began to play the slide guitar, mimicking the style of Robert Johnson. Harper refined his style, taking up the Weissenborn slide guitar. Harper was offered an invitation by Taj Mahal to tour with the artist. They recorded Taj Mahal's album Follow the Drinking Gourd, released in November 1990, and toured Hawaii.

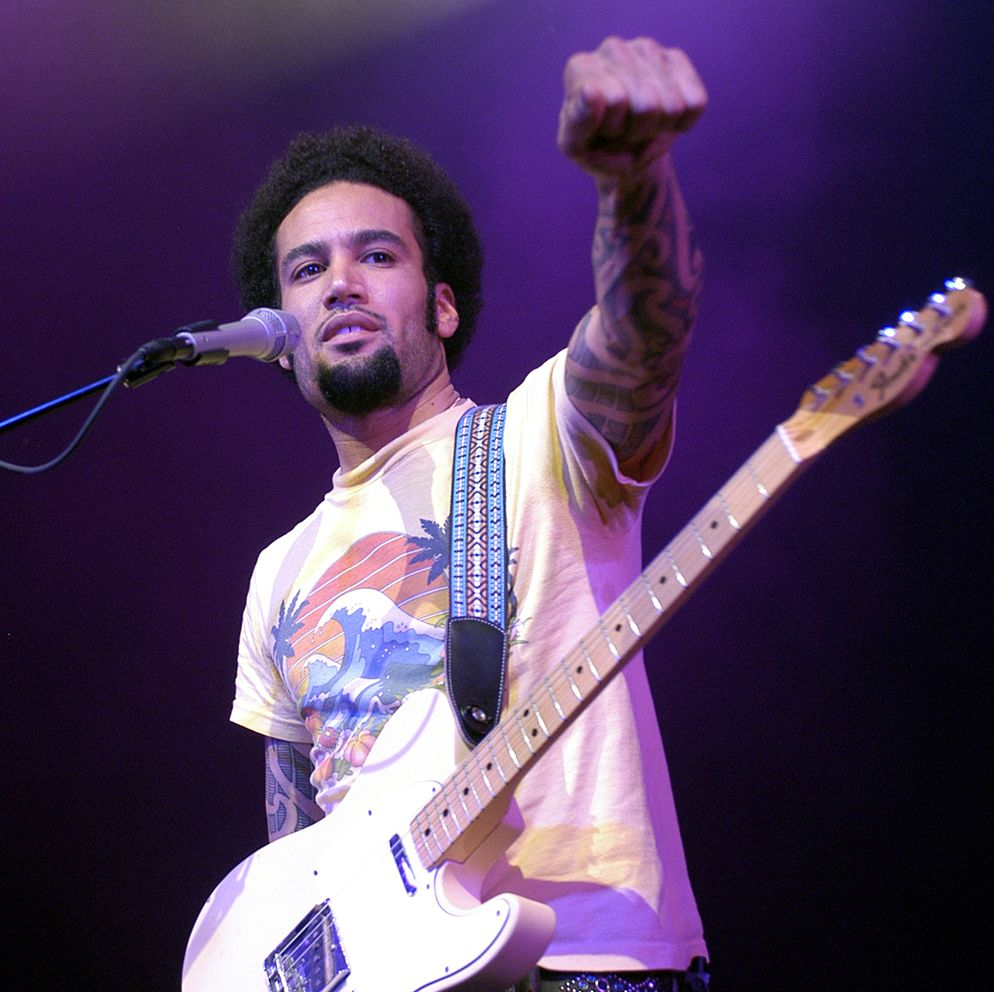
Harper on stage in 2003

In 1992, Harper recorded the LP Pleasure and Pain with folk multi-instrumentalist Tom Freund. After this limited-edition record, Harper secured a lifetime record deal with Virgin Records. In 1993, he toured venues in California and France with his band, Ben Harper and the Innocent Criminals, and performed with Taj Mahal at Austin City Limits.

In 1994, Harper released his debut album, Welcome to the Cruel World and toured the US and Canada with the Innocent Criminals. In November of the same year, he performed two solo shows in Spain.

He released his second album, Fight For Your Mind, in 1995, with Juan Nelson on bass, which became a college radio favorite and included several songs that Harper has played live throughout his career. The same year, the band expanded their reach to Europe and performed in the Netherlands, Switzerland, Italy, Spain, Canada, and a handful of US dates. His music received a great deal of airplay and critical acclaim in Europe and was widely played in Australia (first on Triple J radio).

In 1999, at the Santa Barbara Bowl, Harper met Jack Johnson and sent a demo tape of Johnson's songs to his producer, J. P. Plunier, who then produced Johnson's first album, Brushfire Fairytales, in December 2000. Jack Johnson became the opening act in late February 2001 for the last 23 cities of Ben Harper's "Innocent Criminals" tour of the United States.

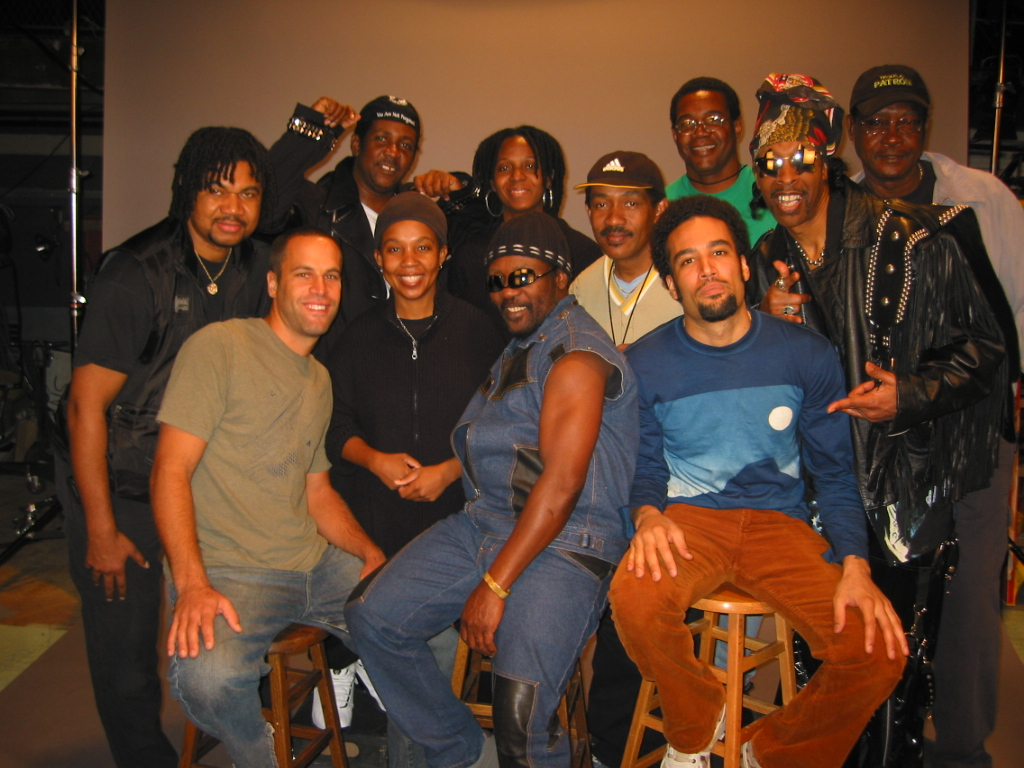
Ben Harper backstage with Toots and the Maytals and Jack Johnson.

In 2002, Harper was one of the featured singers covering Motown hits by Marvin Gaye in the documentary, Standing in the Shadows of Motown (a history of The Funk Brothers). Harper was featured on the album True Love by Toots and the Maytals, which won the Grammy Award in 2004 for Best Reggae Album, and showcased many notable musicians including Willie Nelson, Eric Clapton, Jeff Beck, Trey Anastasio, Gwen Stefani / No Doubt, Bonnie Raitt, Manu Chao, The Roots, Ryan Adams, Keith Richards, Toots Hibbert, Paul Douglas, Jackie Jackson, Ken Boothe, and The Skatalites. In 2003, Harper was French Rolling Stone magazine's Artist of the Year (Artiste De L'Année), and his Australian tour that year for Diamonds on the Inside was highly successful with record sales. On April 3, 2004, Harper and Jack Johnson performed with Toots and the Maytals on Saturday Night Live (season 29, episode 16), a show hosted by Donald Trump.

In October 2004, Harper participated in the Vote for Change concert tour organized to benefit Moveon.org and encourage people in the swing states to vote during the 2004 U.S. presidential election. In the same month, Harper contributed a live recording of the song "Oppression" to For The Lady, a benefit album for jailed Nobel Peace Prize winner and Burmese pro-democracy advocate Aung San Suu Kyi.

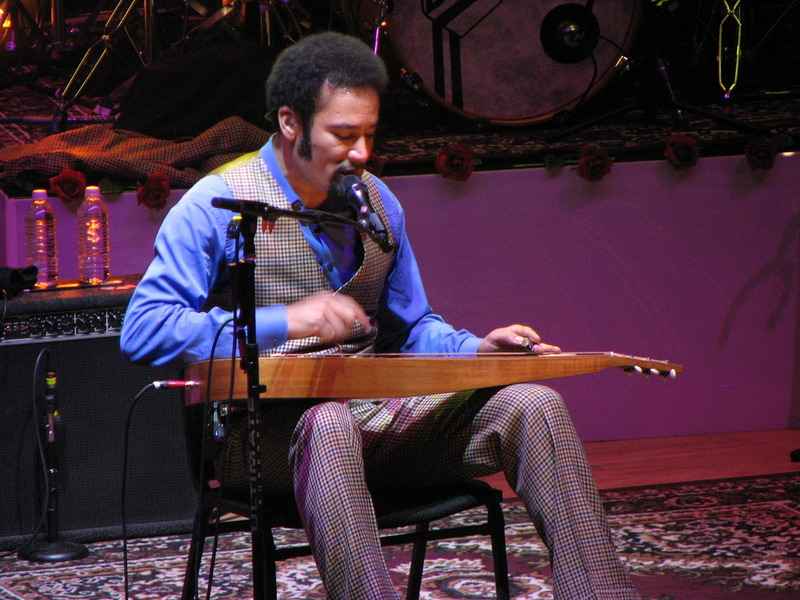
Harper playing a Weissenborn in Massey Hall, Toronto, Ontario, 2008

In 2006, Harper released the double album Both Sides of the Gun which debuted at number 7 on the Billboard 200. Though uncredited, he appears briefly in the 2006 David Lynch film Inland Empire, alongside his wife Laura Dern.

Harper is part of the No Nukes group, which is against the expansion of nuclear power. In 2007, the group recorded a music video of a version of the Buffalo Springfield song "For What It's Worth". Harper's collaboration "Boa Sorte/Good Luck" with Brazilian singer Vanessa da Mata peaked at No. 1 in Brazil and Portugal. In Brazil it also won a highly coveted Prêmio Multishow for "Best Song" in 2008. Also in 2008, Harper participated in the benefit album Songs for Tibet.

Harper discussing Lifeline in 2007

On August 27, 2010, it was reported that Harper had formed a band called Fistful of Mercy with Dhani Harrison and Joseph Arthur. Fistful of Mercy released their debut record, As I Call You Down, on October 5, 2010.

On May 17, 2011, Harper's official site posted that his next album was released, entitled Give Till It's Gone. The album is a continuation of recording with Relentless7.

On October 1, 2012, an album from Harper with Charlie Musselwhite was announced titled Get Up! on Stax Records / Concord Music Group. The official release date for the album was January 29, 2013. Get Up! was recorded in Los Angeles and produced by Harper. It is Harper's 12th studio album and first recording since 2011's Give Till It's Gone (Virgin).

In December 2012, it was announced that Harper had co-produced lead vocalist Natalie Maines of the Dixie Chicks first solo rock album Mother. It was released on May 7, 2013.

In early 2015, it was announced that Harper and the Innocent Criminals would perform at the Boston Calling Music Festival in May 2015. Ben Harper and the Innocent Criminals performed at Rock Werchter Festival 2015 on June 28, 2015.

On February 12, 2016, Harper released (as a YouTube video) the single "Call It What It Is", the first track taken from his studio album Call It What It Is, released on April 8, 2016.

On April 8, 2019, Harper performed as a guest artist on the seventeenth season of American Idol during the second night of the "Top 20 Duets" episode. Harper sang with contestant Alejandro Aranda, playing "There Will Be a Light".

At the 40th Blues Music Awards ceremony, Harper's joint composition with Charlie Musselwhite, "No Mercy In This Land", was named as 'Song of the Year'.

On March 20, 2019, Mavis Staples announced the album We Get By, featuring eleven tracks written and produced by Harper. The title track, which features Harper on vocals and in the music video, was released on May 15, 2019.

In 2020, Harper released Winter Is for Lovers, an album recorded with solo Monteleone lap steel songs. "It started out as an exploration of steel guitar," Harper told Acoustic Guitar magazine in a 2020 interview, "Winter Is for Lovers is written as one piece of music; let's define that in the way that the old classical guitarists would have, on a single guitar (the Monteleone lap steel)."

On June 9, 2021, Harper's longtime bassist, collaborator, and Innocent Criminals member, Juan Nelson, died at the age 62. Harper paid tribute to him, stating on Twitter: "Beloved husband, father, musical genius, BHIC band member of 27 years, and the finest man I've ever known. It's near impossible for me to put words to this pain and loss. Rest in Glory our beloved Reverend Juan." No cause of death has been confirmed.

On July 22, 2022, Harper released the album Bloodline Maintenance. The album was dedicated to the memory of Juan Nelson.

On June 2, 2023, Harper released his seventeenth album, Wide Open Light. This is Harper's first album to feature mainly stripped-back acoustic songs with only one track featuring drums.

On April 1, 2024, ex-Innocent Criminals guitarist, Michael Ward died at the age of 57 due to complications from diabetes. On May 1, 2025, Harper released new single, "Before The Rain Dried," in tribute to Ward.

== Personal life ==
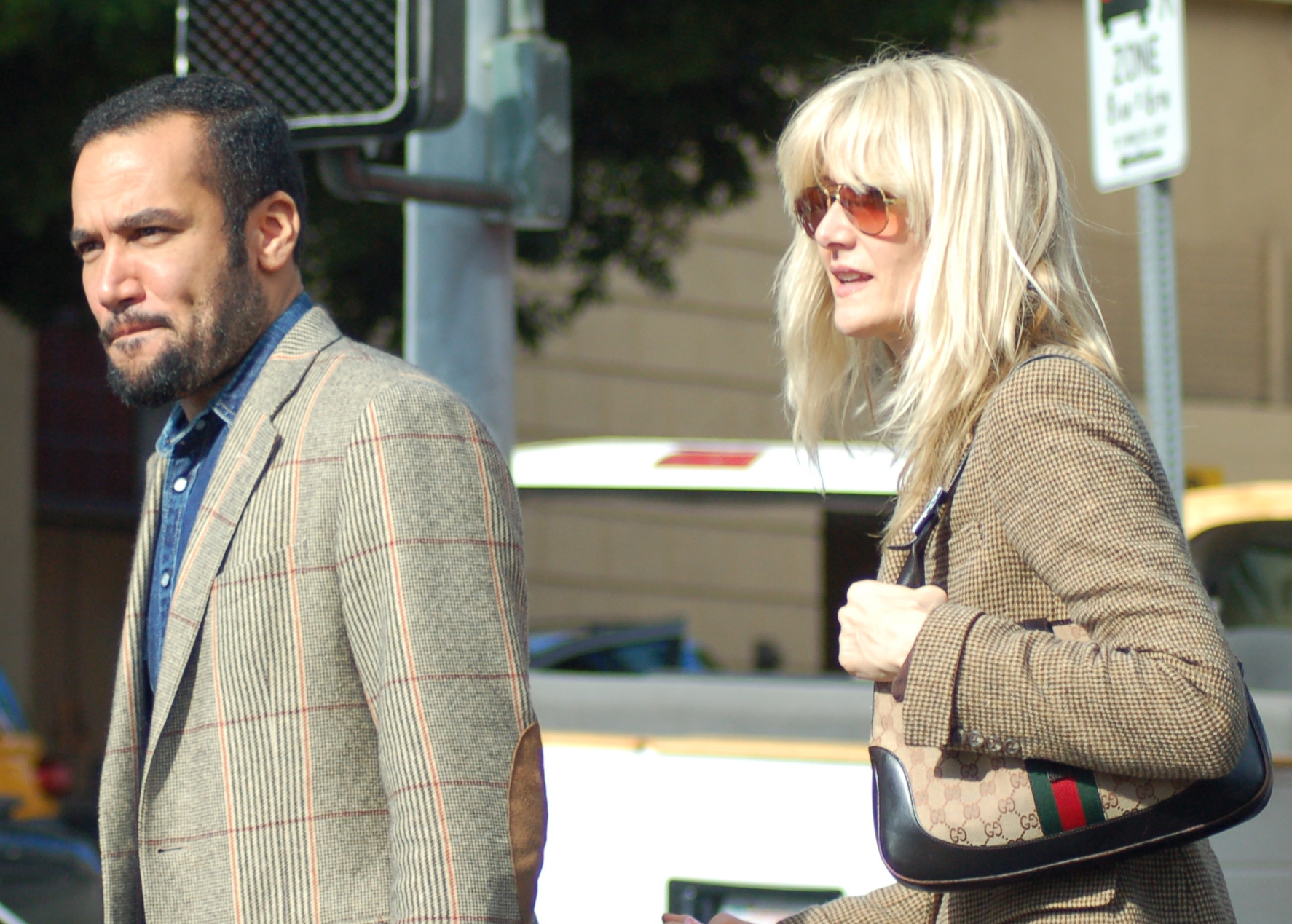
Harper with his second wife, Laura Dern, in December 2009

In 1996, Harper married his first wife, Joanna. They have two children together. Harper and Joanna separated in 2000, and were divorced in 2001.

Harper began dating actress Laura Dern after they met at one of his concerts in Fall 2000. Harper and Dern married on December 23, 2005, at their home in Los Angeles. They have two children, son Ellery Walker (born August 2001) and daughter Jaya (born November 2004). In 2006, the pair co-directed the video for his song "Better Way." In October 2010, Harper filed for divorce from Dern, citing irreconcilable differences. They briefly reconciled and attended the 2012 Golden Globe Awards together, but Dern reactivated the divorce by filing a legal response in July 2012. The divorce was finalized in September 2013.

Harper married social advocate Jaclyn Matfus, on January 1, 2015. Their son Besso was born in June 2017.

Harper is a skateboarder who has trained with Rodney Mullen and he also owns a warehouse for his personal skateboarding. Harper co-owns the skateboarding brand Roller Horror with professional skateboarder Mike York. In September 2016, Harper appeared on The Nine Club skateboard podcast, hosted by Chris Roberts, where he discussed his relationship and history with skateboarding. On The Nine Club, he also reveals that he went to school and began skateboarding with Chris Miller in Pomona, California.

Harper's cousin is Washington State Supreme Court Justice Steven Gonzalez.

== Philanthropy ==
Harper supports Little Kids Rock, a national nonprofit organization that works to restore and revitalize music education in disadvantaged U.S. public schools. In 2013, he donated items to their San Francisco Bay Area benefit concert.

On December 11, 2016, he played an acoustic benefit concert at Bimbos in San Francisco supporting New Light India's "Boys Home Project". Founded in 2000 by Urmi Basu, New Light India provides shelter, educational opportunities, recreational facilities, healthcare and legal aid for the girls and women in Kalighat, notorious for its red light district.

Harper and his wife, Jaclyn, have been long-time supporters of International Medical Corps’ work around the world. During the COVID-19 pandemic, they supported the organization's work in California, and Harper recorded a song to benefit International Medical Corps’ global relief efforts.

== Legacy ==
A dead-end street has been named after Ben Harper in Saint-Jean-d'Heurs, a rural commune of France.

== Awards and nominations ==
Year	Award Show	Award/Nomination
2003	Rolling Stone (France)	Artist of the Year
2005	Grammy Award	Grammy Award for Best Pop Instrumental Performance
2005	Grammy Award	Grammy Award for Best Traditional Soul Gospel Album
2014	Grammy Award	Grammy Award for Best Blues Album

== Discography ==
Studio albums

- Welcome to the Cruel World (1994)
- Fight for Your Mind (1995)
- The Will to Live (1997)
- Burn to Shine (with The Innocent Criminals) (1999)
- Diamonds on the Inside (2003)
- There Will Be a Light (with The Blind Boys of Alabama) (2004)
- Both Sides of the Gun (2006)
- Lifeline (with The Innocent Criminals) (2007)
- White Lies for Dark Times (with Relentless7) (2009)
- Give Till It's Gone (2011)
- Get Up! (with Charlie Musselwhite) (2013)
- Childhood Home (with Ellen Harper) (2014)
- Call It What It Is (with The Innocent Criminals) (2016)
- No Mercy in This Land (with Charlie Musselwhite) (2018)
- Winter Is for Lovers (2020)
- Bloodline Maintenance (2022)
- Wide Open Light (2023)

== Filmography ==
Year	Title	Notes
1998–2001	Daria	Episode: "See Jane Run" (Song: "Faded"); Episode: "Camp Fear" (Song: "Burn to Shine")
2001	I Am Sam	Song: "Strawberry Fields Forever"
2002	Standing in the Shadows of Motown	Songs: "Ain't Too Proud To Beg"/"I Heard It Through the Grapevine"
2002	Searching for Debra Winger	Song: "The Three of Us"
2003	rage	Episode: "Grinspoon Guest Program Rage"; Song: "Ground on Down"
2003	One Tree Hill	Episode: "Crash Into You"; Song: "Empty Apartment"
2003	Joan of Arcadia	Episode: "Death Be Not Whatever"; Song: "Blessed to Be a Witness"
2004	Saturday Night Live	Episode: "Donald Trump/Toots and the Maytals"; Song: "Love Gonna Walk Out on Me"
2004	Sleepover	Song: "Walk Away"
2005	Trust the Man	Song: "Everything"
2006	Akeelah and the Bee	Song: "Everything"
2006	The O.C.	Episode: "The Dawn Patrol"; Song: "Waiting For You"
2006	CSI: NY	Episode: "And Here's to You, Mrs. Azrael"; Song: "Walk Away"
2006	Ultimate Sessions	Song: "Whipping Boy"
2007	Arctic Tale	Song: "Happy Ever After in Your Eyes"
2008	Henry Poole Is Here	Song: "Morning Yearning"
2008	Wetlands Preserved: The Story of an Activist Nightclub	Song: "People Lead"
2008	Daylight Robbery	Song: "Diamonds On The Inside"
2009	State of Play	Song: "Please Don't Talk About Murder While I'm Eating"
2009	House	Episode: "Brave Heart"; Song: "Faithfully Remain"
2010	Late Night with Jimmy Fallon	Episode: 2.152 (Song: "Father's Song"); Episode: 2.7 (Songs: "With a Little Help from My Friends", "Walk With You")
2010	Les Petits Mouchoirs	Song: "Amen Omen"
2010	Vampire Diaries	Episode: Katerina; Song: "Amen Omen"
2010	The Fighter	Song: "Glory & Consequence"
2010	Close to the Dream	Song: "Better Way"
2010–2011	Conan	Episode: October 11, 2010 (Song: "Father's Son"); Episode: May 25, 2011 (Song: "Rock n' Roll is Free")
2011	Wretches & Jabberers	Song: "More Like You"
2012	The Girl	Song: "Waiting on an Angel"
2012	Redfern Now	Episode: Raymond; Song: "Not Fire Not Ice"
2012	Bones Brigade: An Autobiography	
2010–2013	Late Show with David Letterman	Episode February 2, 2012 (Song: "Lay There & Hate Me"); Episode May 18, 2011 (Song: "Rock n' Roll is Free"); Episode April 29, 2013 (Song: "We Can't End This Way")
2011–2013	The Tonight Show with Jay Leno	Episode May 24, 2011 (Song: "Rock n' Roll is Free"); Episode November 18, 2011 (Song: "Save the Hammer for the Man"); January 22, 2013 (Song: "I Don't Believe a Word You Say")
2013	Beautiful Creatures (2013 film)	Song: "Run to Me"
2014	The Late Late Show with Craig Ferguson	Episode: June 13, 2014; Song: "Learn It All Again Tomorrow"
2023	Extrapolations	Episode: "2070: Ecocide" (Character: Tyrone Downs)
