= Charles Driebe =

American entertainment lawyer, talent manager and record producer

- Born: July 13, 1956 (age 70); Fort Gaines, Georgia, U.S.
- Genres: Jazz, Gospel, Funk, Soul, R&B, Pop, Rock
- Occupations: Talent manager, producer of recordings and concerts, entertainment attorney, songwriter
- Years active: 1990–present
- Website: www.blindambitionmgt.com/charles-driebe

Charles James Driebe Jr. (born July 13, 1956) is an American personal manager of musical artists known for managing the Blind Boys of Alabama since 2000. He is also a Grammy-winning record producer, an entertainment attorney, a producer of live performances and concert tours, and a Grammy-nominated songwriter. He is the founder and CEO of Blind Ambition Management Ltd.

== Early life and education ==
Driebe was born in Fort Gaines, Georgia. His family moved to Atlanta when he was five years old. His father was a prominent attorney and one-time member of the Atlanta Board of Aldermen (later renamed the Atlanta City Council). Driebe's father had a client, Herb Lance, who was a DJ known as ‘Cousin Herb’ on a Black-owned radio station WERD (Atlanta), and also owned a record shop on Auburn Avenue. Driebe frequented the shop, and Lance gave him DJ promo copies of blues and soul albums, kindling Driebe's love for the music.

Driebe completed a BA at Tulane University while a DJ, Jazz Program Director, and eventually college radio WTUL Station Program Director. He completed a JD at the University of Georgia, where he was also a DJ at WUOG. During law school, he assisted newly formed R.E.M. land their first Atlanta show, then a series of shows at the Hedgens bar in the Buckhead neighborhood.

== Career ==
Driebe joined his father in his general practice law firm in Clayton County, Georgia, in the 1980s and served as the president of the Clayton County Bar Association and as a member of the board of governors of the State Bar of Georgia during that decade.

In 1990, Driebe decided to combine his legal training with his passion for music. He began shifting into entertainment law, eventually serving on the executive board of the State Bar's Sports and Entertainment Law Section. Driebe was also a board member of the Georgia Lawyers of the Arts and was the chairman of the Board of its predecessor, the Southern Entertainment & Art Law Center.

As an attorney, Driebe has represented diverse clients such as singer/songwriter Randall Bramblett (Sea Level, Steve Winwood), producer John Keane (R.E.M., Widespread Panic), musical artist/actor Chris Thomas King (who appeared in the movies O Brother Where Art Thou? and Ray), record label Monkey Hill Records and the Georgia Music and Sports Halls of Fame.

Driebe formerly taught a course on Art and Law at the Atlanta College of Art and has spoken at numerous seminars, including SXSW, WOMEX, and the North American Law Summit, and on radio, television, and podcasts about entertainment law and management.

To be more involved in all aspects of an artist's career, he started managing artists in 1996. His first management client was the blind New Orleans jazz/blues/funk pianist Henry Butler. Driebe negotiated deals for Butler with Black Top Records and Alligator Records, and Butler released albums on those labels during Driebe's tenure as manager, including a collaborative album with Corey Harris on Alligator.

Driebe established Blind Ambition Management in 1998. The company provides a full range of services to its music clients, from career management to legal assistance. Blind Ambition Management has managed a number of noted musical artists, including multiple of Grammy-nominated and Grammy-winning artists.

In 2000, Driebe began managing the Blind Boys of Alabama. The group's first-ever Grammy Award came for its 2001 album "Spirit of the Century," which brought together more traditional gospel tunes with fresh takes on songs by contemporary artists such as Tom Waits — and the group's rendition of Waits' "Way Down in the Hole " was featured as the theme song for the first season of the TV show "The Wire."

The Blind Boys of Alabama then won Grammys for their next three albums, including in 2005 for There Will Be a Light, a collaborative album with Ben Harper. That year, the group also performed on the Grammy telecast with Kanye West and John Legend in what has been called one of the best Grammy performances of all time.

Their fifth Grammy came for the 2009 album ‘Down in New Orleans,’ with Driebe serving as Executive Producer of the album and co-producer of the follow-up DVD/CD entitled ‘Live In New Orleans’, (which also aired on PBS stations nationwide). The band also won multiple GMA Dove Awards for Traditional Gospel Album of the Year during this period of time.

During Driebe's tenure, the Blind Boys of Alabama received a Grammy Lifetime Achievement Award in 2009. They were inducted into the Gospel Music Hall of Fame in 2003 and the Alabama Music Hall of Fame in 2010. Since 2000, the Blind Boys of Alabama have made appearances in the films The Fighting Temptations and Hop (film), and have been featured on such television series as 60 Minutes II and The Colbert Report, as well as on multiple episodes of The Today Show, The Tonight Show with Jay Leno and Late Night with David Letterman. They were invited to perform at the White House in both 2002, during the presidency of George W. Bush, for a celebration of gospel music, and in 2010 during the presidency of Barack Obama, for a celebration of music from the civil rights movement.

The Blind Boys of Alabama have collaborated with numerous artists under Driebe's management tenure, including Peter Gabriel, Susan Tedeschi, Lou Reed, Mavis Staples, Bon Iver, Chrissie Hynde, Aaron Neville, Taj Mahal, and Allen Toussaint.

In 2016, Driebe traveled to the homes of the two surviving original members of the group, Clarence Fountain and Jimmy Carter, and recorded their reflections on their lives. Then Driebe sent the recordings to various songwriters who used the interviews (and sometimes the exact words from them) for inspiration in writing new songs. Songs on the album were written for the Blind Boys of Alabama by writers including Marc Cohn, Phil Cook, John Leventhal, and Valerie June. Driebe was a co-producer on several tracks on the album, as well as a bonus track of a previously unreleased Bob Dylan song, "See By Faith." He also co-wrote an updated version of ‘Pray For Peace,’ originally recorded by the North Mississippi Allstars, for the album. 'Pray for Peace' was the debut single from the album. In 2017, Driebe appeared on NPR's Weekend Edition to discuss the album along with original band member, Jimmy Carter.

In 2019, Driebe served as Executive Producer of a collaborative album featuring the Blind Boys of Alabama with Marc Cohn titled Work To Do.

In 2020, Driebe co-wrote and co-produced two songs that were recorded as collaborations by the Blind Boys of Alabama and Amadou & Mariam. In 2022, he also co-wrote and co-produced another collaborative track with the two groups entitled 'Netola.'

In 2021, the Blind Boys of Alabama received a Grammy nomination for the song "I Wish I Knew How It Would Feel to Be Free," a collaboration with genre-spanning banjo player Bela Fleck, which Driebe and Fleck co-produced.

In 2022, Driebe co-wrote and co-produced (with Peter Levin) a song called ‘The Message,’ a collaboration between the Blind Boys of Alabama and Black Violin, which was nominated for a Grammy for Best Americana Performance. The song was also played during the Blind Boys of Alabama’s appearance on The Today Show on January 16, 2023. "Episode dated 16 January 2023". imdb.com. January 16, 2023.

Driebe was a co-producer of the album 'Echoes of the South' by the Blind Boys of Alabama, which was released on September 8, 2023. It was nominated for a Grammy Award for Best Roots Gospel Album. Also, two songs from the album were nominated for Grammy Awards for a total of three nominations. On February 4, 2024, the album won a Grammy Award for Best Roots Gospel Album.

From 2009 to 2019, Blind Ambition Management and Driebe managed Ruthie Foster. During that time, Foster released four studio albums, the first three of which were nominated for Grammy Awards (her first nominations). She also won numerous Blues Music Awards, Austin Music Awards, and Living Blues Awards and was inducted into the Texas Music Hall of Fame.

In 2011, Blind Ambition Management and Driebe began managing Stax Records' soul legend William Bell.

In 2013, Bell appeared at the White House as part of the "In Performance at the White House" series on a show entitled ‘Memphis Soul.’

In 2016, Bell recorded This Is Where I Live for the revived Stax Records, his first major label album in over 30 years. In 2017, Bell was awarded a Grammy for Best Americana Album for the album, his first such award. He performed his hit "Born Under a Bad Sign" alongside Gary Clark Jr. on the 2017 Grammy Awards telecast. Bell was also featured on Rolling Stone's "Best of the Grammys" for that year. The win and the performance had such a strong effect on his streaming data that Rolling Stone called him the night's biggest winner. When Bell's name was called as the winner of the Grammy, he was so stunned that Driebe had to prompt him to head to the stage to collect it.

Later in 2017, Bell performed alongside other legendary Stax Records acts such as Booker T Jones and Sam Moore, as well as Welshman Tom Jones at BBC's 50 Years of Soul event at Royal Albert Hall in London, UK.

Bell was also featured in the documentary film Take Me to the River, which explored the heart of the enduring Memphis music scene. He was featured alongside other artists, including Bobby Bland, Mavis Staples, and Snoop Dogg (with whom he collaborated on a remake of Bell's song ‘I Forgot To Be Your Lover’). Bell spent time in 2017 and 2018 touring with a group of featured artists from Take Me to the River. The touring group was named one of the "10 Bands to See This Year" by Parade.

Driebe and Blind Ambition Management have managed other artists as well, including Marc Cohn of ‘Walking in Memphis’ fame, folk duo Over the Rhine (band), blues harmonica legend Charlie Musselwhite, singer/songwriter Steve Forbert, troubadour Steve Poltz, indie band The Low Anthem, and southern raconteur Paul Thorn.

In 2019, Driebe co-produced the recording of Big Band of Brothers; A Jazz Celebration of The Allman Brothers Band. The album spawned tours in 2021 and 2022, with Driebe serving as producer of the shows, which featured Jaimoe (one of the original members of The Allman Brothers Band) and other special guests.

Driebe conceived and co-produced a multimedia show based on the Grammy-winning box set Voices of Mississippi: Artists and Musicians Documented by William Ferris. It featured archival film and photos from William R. Ferris and debuted at the University of Mississippi in 2021. The show then sold out at Lincoln Center in 2022 before continuing on tour in 2022 and 2023.

Driebe completed a residency at the Hambidge Center and became a Hambidge Fellow in 2021.

Charles was quoted numerous times in the book 'Spirit of the Century: Our Own Story' by Preston Lauterbach and the Blind Boys of Alabama, which was released in March, 2024 by Hachette Book Group.

Charles was the executive producer of a Christmas single featuring the Blind Boys of Alabama and Jay Buchanan (of Rival Sons) released in November 2024.

Charles was the co-producer of Kyle Roussel's album release show at the New Orleans staple venue Tipitina's in January 2025. The show featured guests who appeared on Roussel's album 'Church of New Orleans,' including Irma Thomas, Ivan Neville, the Preservation Hall Jazz Band, John Boutte, and others.

== Awards ==
Driebe was named Manager of the Year in 2007 by the Blues Foundation.

== Discography ==
=== Production ===
- Down In New Orleans, The Blind Boys of Alabama (2008) (Album)
- Live In New Orleans, The Blind Boys of Alabama (2009)
- Almost Home, The Blind Boys of Alabama (2017)
- Work To Do, The Blind Boys of Alabama (with Marc Cohn) (2019)
- A Jazz Celebration of The Allman Brothers Band, Big Band of Brothers (2019)
- From Bamako to Birmingham, The Blind Boys of Alabama (with Amadou & Mariam) (2020)
- I Wish I Knew How It Would Feel To Be Free, The Blind Boys of Alabama (Single with Bela Fleck) (2021)
- Netola, The Blind Boys of Alabama (Single with Amadou & Mariam) (2022)
- The Message, The Blind Boys of Alabama (Single with Black Violin) (2022)
- Echoes of the South, The Blind Boys of Alabama (2023)

=== Management ===
- Blues After Sunset, Henry Butler (1998)
- Funk If I Know, Michael Ray and the Cosmic Krewe (1998)
- Vu-Du Menz, Henry Butler and Corey Harris (2000)
- Spirit Of The Century, The Blind Boys of Alabama (2001)
- Higher Ground, The Blind Boys of Alabama (2002)
- Go Tell It On The Mountain, The Blind Boys of Alabama (2003)
- There Will Be A Light, The Blind Boys of Alabama with Ben Harper (2004)
- Sanctuary, Charlie Musselwhite (2004)
- Miracle Mule, The Subdudes (2004)
- Atom Bomb, The Blind Boys of Alabama (2005)
- In The Cool, Pieta Brown (2005)
- Live at the Apollo, The Blind Boys of Alabama and Ben Harper (2005)
- Delta Hardware, Charlie Musselwhite (2006)
- Remember The Sun, Pieta Brown (2007)
- Down In New Orleans, The Blind Boys of Alabama (2008)
- Traveling/Unraveling, Steve Poltz (2008)
- The Truth According to Ruthie Foster, Ruthie Foster (2009)
- Pimps and Preachers, Paul Thorn (2010)
- Take The High Road, The Blind Boys of Alabama (2011)
- The Long Surrender, Over the Rhine (2011)
- Live at Antones, Ruthie Foster (2011)
- Over With You, Steve Forbert (2012)
- Let It Burn, Ruthie Foster (2012)
- What the Hell Is Goin’ On?, Paul Thorn (2012)
- I’ll Find A Way, The Blind Boys of Alabama (2013)
- Meet Me At The Edge Of The World, Over the Rhine (2013)
- Talkin’ Christmas, The Blind Boys of Alabama and Taj Mahal (2014)
- Blood Oranges in the Snow, Over the Rhine (2014)
- Too Blessed to be Stressed, Paul Thorn (2014)
- Promise of a Brand New Day, Ruthie Foster (2014)
- Live at Terminal West, AJ Ghent Band (2015)
- This Is Where I Live, William Bell (2016)
- Joy Comes Back, Ruthie Foster (2017)
- Mission Temple Fireworks Revival, Paul Thorn (DVD) (2018)
- The Salt Doll Went to Measure the Depth of the Sea, The Low Anthem (2018)
- Don’t Let the Devil Ride, Paul Thorn (2018)
- Pimps and Preachers, Paul Thorn (2010)
- Love & Revelation, Over the Rhine (2014)

=== Songwriter ===
- Almost Home, The Blind Boys of Alabama (2017)
- From Bamako to Birmingham, The Blind Boys of Alabama (with Amadou & Mariam) (2020)
- Netola, The Blind Boys of Alabama (Single with Amadou & Mariam) (2022)
- The Message, The Blind Boys of Alabama (Single with Black Violin) (2022)
