= George Scott (singer) =

American gospel singer (1929–2005)

- Born: George Lewis Scott; March 18, 1929; Notasulga, Alabama, U.S.
- Died: March 9, 2005 (aged 75) Durham, North Carolina, U.S.
- Genre: Gospel
- Occupation: Singer
- Years active: 1939–2004
- Label: Real World Records
- Formerly of: The Blind Boys of Alabama
- Spouse: Ludie Lewis Mann Scott
- Award: Grammy Award for Best Traditional Soul Gospel Album (2002, 2003, 2004, 2005)

George Lewis Scott (March 18, 1929 – March 9, 2005) was an American gospel singer and a founding member of The Blind Boys of Alabama. Known for his rich baritone voice, he performed with the group for 66 years.

== Early life ==
Scott was born blind in Notasulga, Alabama, and educated at the Talladega Institute for the Negro Deaf and Blind in Talladega. While at the institute, he met Clarence Fountain and Jimmy Carter, and in 1939 they formed the Happy Land Jubilee Singers. Scott later described the school as strict, but it was where he learned to read music in braille and developed his singing skills.

== Career ==
In 1944, the group left the institute to perform professionally as "The Five Blind Boys of Alabama". They later dropped the "Five" from the name due to the fluctuating number of members. Their energetic jubilee singing incorporated jazz and blues influences. However, they gained little recognition outside the black gospel community for the next four decades. That changed with their appearance in the 1983 Broadway production The Gospel at Colonus, starring Morgan Freeman. After that appearance, recordings and collaborations followed with Lou Reed, Solomon Burke, Ben Harper, Buena Vista Social Club, and singer Ibrahim Ferrer. The group received four consecutive Grammy Awards for Best Traditional Soul Gospel Album between 2002 and 2005 for Spirit of the Century, Higher Ground, Go Tell It on the Mountain and There Will Be a Light. Scott sang lead on several tracks from the posthumously released album Atom Bomb. The Blind Boys of Alabama were inducted into the Gospel Music Hall of Fame in 2003.

Scott was a constant member of Blind Boys of Alabama until he retired from touring a year before his death.

== Later life and death ==
Scott retired from touring in 2004 due to declining health. He died at his home in Durham, North Carolina, on March 9, 2005, from complications of diabetes and a heart condition. He was survived by his wife, Ludie Lewis Mann Scott, his mother and his sister.

== See also ==
- Gospel Music Hall of Fame
