= Gause =

Gause may refer to:

- Gause (surname)
- Gause, Texas, United States
- gause meter, an electronic device also known as an "EMF Meter".
- GAUSE-17, a US Navy designation for the M134 Minigun.

== Schools in the United States ==
- Gause Academy of Leadership and Applied Technology in Bartow, Florida
- Gause Riverside Academy in Fort Meade, Florida
- Gause Elementary in Washougal, Washington
- Gause Elementary in Gause, Texas
- Gause Junior High in Gause, Texas

== Related ==
- Gauze fabric
