= Ske-Dat-De-Dat: The Spirit of Satch =

Studio album by Dr. John
- Released: August 19, 2014
- Recorded: December 10–13, 2013; January 2–3, 2014
- Studios: Esplanade Studios (New Orleans, LA); World Alert Music (New York, NY); The Village Studios (Los Angeles, CA); G Studios Digital (Studio City, CA); Sugar Hill Studios (Houston, TX)
- Genre: R&B
- Length: 58:24
- Labels: Proper; Concord
- Producers: Dr. John; Sarah Morrow

Dr. John chronology
Locked Down (2012)	Ske-Dat-De-Dat: The Spirit of Satch (2014)	Things Happen That Way (2022)

Ske-Dat-De-Dat: The Spirit of Satch is a tribute album by American musician Dr. John, composed of thirteen songs from Louis "Satch" Armstrong's repertoire. It was released on August 19, 2014, via Proper/Concord Records, making it his final studio album before his death from a heart attack in 2019.

The album was primarily recorded at Esplanade Studios in Dr. John's hometown of New Orleans from December 10 to 13 in 2013 and January 2 to 3 in 2014, with additional recording on February 24, 2014. The recording sessions also took place at World Alert Music in New York, The Village Studios in Los Angeles, G Studios Digital in Studio City and Sugar Hill Studios in Houston for several featured artists. The album was produced by Sarah Morrow and Dr. John.

It features guest appearances from Arturo Sandoval, Nicholas Payton, the Blind Boys of Alabama, the McCrary Sisters, Terence Blanchard, Anthony Hamilton, Bonnie Raitt, Dirty Dozen Brass Band, James "12" Andrews, Ledisi, Mike Ladd, Shemekia Copeland, Telmary Diaz, and Wendell Brunious.

In the United States, the album peaked at number 84 on the Billboard 200 and atop of both the Jazz Albums and Contemporary Jazz Albums charts.

== Critical reception ==
Professional ratings
Aggregate scores
Source	Rating
Metacritic	72/100
Review scores
Source	Rating
AllMusic	3.5/5 stars
American Songwriter	4/5 stars
The Arts Desk	1/5 stars
Drowned in Sound	5/10
PopMatters	7/10
Record Collector	4/5 stars
USA Today	3.5/4 stars

Ske-Dat-De-Dat: The Spirit of Satch was met with generally favourable reviews from music critics. At Metacritic, which assigns a normalized rating out of 100 to reviews from mainstream publications, the album received an average score of 72, based on eleven reviews.

Hal Horowitz of American Songwriter praised the album, calling it "a feisty, dynamic hour long set that does what it sets out to: captures Armstrong's indefatigable spirit and keeps his music alive for a new generation". Terry Staunton of Record Collector wrote: "though billed as a salute to Armstrong, Ske-Dat-De-Dat… could more accurately be described as a celebration of Crescent City, the magic and wonder of the burg embraced to the max on a gloriously heartwarming 'That's My Home'". AllMusic's Thom Jurek stated: "though a couple of cuts fall short of the mark, and the set may have a few too many guests, Ske-Dat-De-Dat is a solid tribute to Armstrong. It does take chances and almost always pulls them off thanks to Dr. John's signature blend of musical imagination, wit, and savvy cool". George de Stefano of PopMatters wrote: "none of them is a complete dud--Sandoval's red-hot soloing saves "Tight Like That"—they just feel like they belong on different albums. Had they been pruned, Ske-Dat-De-Dat really would have been a dream tribute to Satchmo".

In his mixed review for Drowned in Sound, Jack Doherty concluded: "there's no doubt that Skee-Dat-De-Dat...Spirit of Satch is a project of love, but by the closing stages there's no getting away from it; the album is a bit of a... drag".

Randy Lewis of the Los Angeles Times wrote that tribute albums come and go, "but it's a real rarity that can snap a listener to attention like Dr. John's new salute to jazz founding father Louis Armstrong. Ske-Dat-De-Dat turns many of the songs Armstrong recorded inside out and upside down, fast-forwarding them to 2014 with hip-hop beats, funk grooves and wildly inventive horn arrangements that are the work of John and his co-producer and arranger for the project, trombonist Sarah Morrow". Robert H. Cataliotti's review in Living Blues underlines that Sarah Morrow's "dynamic, textured, and swinging horn charts play a big part in shaping all the different stylistic approaches into a unified soundscape".

Mojo ranked the album at No. 50 on its '50 Best Albums of 2014' list. It was selected as a DownBeat editor's pick.

== Track listing ==
No.	Title	Writer(s)	Length
1.	"What a Wonderful World" (featuring Nicholas Payton and The Blind Boys of Alabama)	Bob Thiele; George David Weiss	4:10
2.	"Mack the Knife" (featuring Terence Blanchard and Mike Ladd)	Kurt Weill; Bertolt Brecht; Marc Blitzstein	6:13
3.	"Tight Like This" (featuring Arturo Sandoval and Telmary Diaz)	Langston Curl	4:51
4.	"I've Got the World on a String" (featuring Bonnie Raitt)	Ted Koehler; Harold Arlen	4:04
5.	"Gut Bucket Blues" (featuring Nicholas Payton)	Louis Armstrong	2:47
6.	"Sometimes I Feel Like a Motherless Child" (featuring Anthony Hamilton)	Traditional	4:45
7.	"That's My Home" (featuring Wendell Brunious and The McCrary Sisters)	Ben Ellison; Leon René; Otis René	3:55
8.	"Nobody Knows the Trouble I've Seen" (featuring Ledisi and The McCrary Sisters)	Traditional	4:36
9.	"Wrap Your Troubles in Dreams" (featuring Terence Blanchard and The Blind Boys of Alabama)	Harry Barris; Ted Koehler; Billy Moll	6:36
10.	"Dippermouth Blues" (featuring James "12" Andrews)	Joseph Oliver	4:27
11.	"Sweet Hunk O' Trash" (featuring Shemekia Copeland)	Flournoy Miller; James P. Johnson	4:18
12.	"Memories of You" (featuring Arturo Sandoval)	Andy Razaf; Eubie Blake	5:02
13.	"When You're Smiling (The Whole World Smiles with You)" (featuring Dirty Dozen Brass Band)	Joe Goodwin; Larry Shay; Mark Fisher	2:40
Total length:			58:24

== Personnel ==
- Mac "Dr. John" Rebennack Jr. – vocals (tracks: 1–5, 7, 9–13), piano, guitar (track 4), RMI keyboards (tracks: 6, 11), arrangement (tracks: 1, 5, 7, 9–11, 13), horns arrangement (track 10), producer

Vocalists

- Jimmy Carter – vocals (tracks: 1, 9)
- Eric "Ricky" McKinnie – vocals (tracks: 1, 9)
- Ben Moore – vocals (tracks: 1, 9)
- Paul Beasley – vocals (tracks: 1, 9)
- Joey Williams – vocals (tracks: 1, 9)
- Tracy Pierce – vocals (tracks: 1, 9)
- Mike Ladd – vocals (track 2)
- Telmary Diaz – vocals (track 3)
- Bonnie Raitt – vocals (track 4)
- Anthony Hamilton – vocals (track 6)
- Ann McCrary – background vocals (tracks: 7, 8), vocal arrangement (track 7)
- Regina McCrary – background vocals (tracks: 7, 8), vocal arrangement (track 7)
- Alfreda McCrary – background vocals (tracks: 7, 8), vocal arrangement (track 7)
- Ledisi Young – vocals (track 8)
- Allen McCrary – background vocals (track 8)
- Deborah McCrary – background vocals (track 8)
- Shemekia Copeland – vocals (track 11)

Instrumentalists

- Nicholas Payton – trumpet (tracks: 1, 5)
- Bobby Floyd – Hammond B3 (tracks: 1, 2, 4, 7–9, 11), arrangement (track 11)
- Derwin "Big D." Perkins – guitar, arrangement (track 11)
- Reginald Veal – acoustic bass (tracks: 1, 3, 6, 9), electric bass (tracks: 8, 11), arrangement (track 11)
- Herlin Riley – drums (tracks: 1, 4, 5, 7–13), tambourine (tracks: 5, 9, 10, 12), arrangement (track 11)
- Sarah Morrow – trombone (tracks: 1–7, 9–13), arrangement (tracks: 2–6, 8–12), horns arrangement (tracks: 1–7, 9, 12), producer
- Barney Floyd – trumpet (tracks: 1–7, 9–11)
- Eric Lucero – trumpet (tracks: 1–3, 9–12)
- Khari Allen Lee – alto saxophone (tracks: 1–3, 9, 12), flute (track 4)
- Ed Petersen – tenor saxophone (tracks: 1, 5–7, 9–12)
- Carl A. Blouin – baritone saxophone (tracks: 1–3, 5, 7, 9–12)
- Terence Blanchard – trumpet (tracks: 2, 9)
- Kendrick Marshall – keyboards (tracks: 2, 3, 6)
- Tony Gullage – bass (track 2), electric bass (tracks: 3, 6)
- Jamison Ross – drums (tracks: 2, 3, 6)
- Tony Dagradi – tenor saxophone (tracks: 2, 3)
- Arturo Sandoval – trumpet (tracks: 3, 12)
- Poncho Sanchez – percussion (tracks: 3, 4, 11, 13)
- Ivan Neville – Hammond B3 (tracks: 4, 5, 10)
- Donald Ramsey – electric bass (tracks: 4, 10, 12), bass (track 13)
- Tom Fischer – clarinet (track 4)
- Rex Gregory – bass clarinet (track 4)
- Oliver Bonie – baritone saxophone (track 4)
- Jason Weaver – acoustic bass (tracks: 5, 7)
- Wendell Brunious – flugelhorn (track 7)
- Tom Malone – horns arrangement (track 10)
- James "12" Andrews – trumpet (track 10)
- Roderick Paulin – alto saxophone (tracks: 10, 13)
- Alonzo Bowens – horns arrangement (track 11)
- Nick Volz – trumpet (track 12)
- Brian Quezergue – horns arrangement (track 13)
- Gregory Davis – trumpet (track 13)
- Efrem Towns – trumpet (track 13)
- Kevin Harris – tenor saxophone (track 13)
- Roger Lewis – baritone saxophone (track 13)
- Kirk Joseph – sousaphone (track 13)
- Alvin Ford Jr. – drums (track 13)

Engineers

- Chris Finney – recording
- Misha Kachkachishvili – additional recording, mixing
- Jeff "The Jedi Master" Jones – recording (tracks: 1, 9)
- Yoichi "Yoda" Yamamoto – recording assistant (tracks: 1, 9)
- Dustin Higgins – recording (tracks: 3, 12)
- Seth Presant – recording (tracks: 3, 4, 11, 13)
- Will Wetzel – recording (track 6)
- Chad Brown – recording (tracks: 7, 8)
- Jeremy Rojas – recording (track 8)
- Joe Viers – editing
- Paul Blakemore – mastering
- Malcolm Mills – executive producer
- John Burk – executive producer
- Andy Tavel – executive producer
- Scott Billington – executive producer
- Mike Casteel – music preparation
- Tisha Simeral – music preparation
- Chris Hill – design
- Bobby Van Lenten – design
- Bruce Weber – photography
- Dawn Boller – production coordinator

== Charts ==
Chart (2014)	Peak position
Belgian Albums (Ultratop Flanders)	50
Dutch Albums (Album Top 100)	73
UK Independent Albums (Official Charts)	31
UK Jazz & Blues Albums (Official Charts)	3
US Billboard 200	84
US Top Jazz Albums (Billboard)	1
US Top Contemporary Jazz Albums (Billboard)	1
