= Sarah Morrow =

American jazz musician

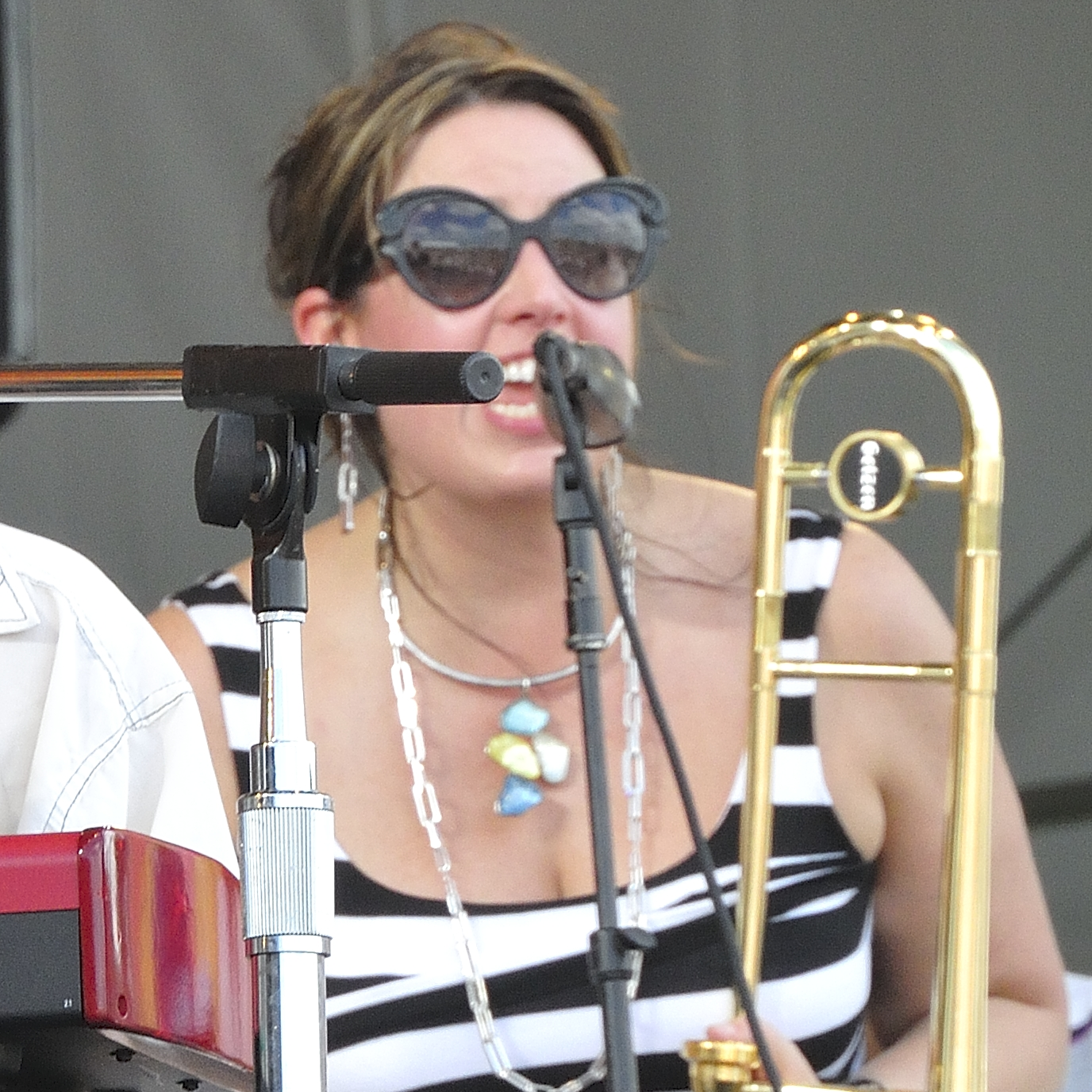
Sarah Morrow, New Orleans Jazz & Heritage Festival (2012)

Sarah Amial Morrow (born November 14, 1969) is an American jazz composer and trombonist.

== Early life ==
Morrow was born in Houston, Texas on November 14, 1969. She studied the clarinet before taking up the trombone at the age of 12. She began playing jazz at the age of 17 in high school; after graduating from Ohio University, she began to play in small jazz formations.

== Early career ==
Morrow was the first female instrumentalist to become a member of Ray Charles's orchestra, joining in 1995. She then worked with musicians such as Bootsy Collins, Fred Wesley, Clyde Stubblefield, Dee Dee Bridgewater, James Spaulding, David Murray, Rhoda Scott, Pee Wee Ellis, and Ricky Ford. Morrow also toured with Dr. John as a bandleader, producer, arranger and conductor for several years.

== Albums ==
Morrow's 2016 album Elektrik Air featured pianist Robert Glasper, drummer Chris “Daddy” Dave, bassist Derrick Hodge, and DJ Jahi Sundance.

Ske-Dat-De-Dat: The Spirit of Satch was produced and arranged by Sarah Morrow and Dr. John, and featured Bonnie Raitt, Arturo Sandoval, Anthony Hamilton, and The Blind Boys of Alabama.

== Discography ==
As a leader

- Green Light (RDC Records, 2000)
- Standards and Others Stories ... (Blue Cobra, 2002) With Jesse Davis, David Murray and Anne Ducros
- Sarah Morrow and the American All-Stars in Paris (O + Music, 2005) With Rhoda Scott and Hal Singer
- Elektric Air September (2007) With Robert Glasper, Derrick Hodges, Chris Dave and Jahi Sundance

With Dr. John

- Ske-Dat-De-Dat: The Spirit of Satch (2014) With Bonnie Raitt, more
- The Musical Mojo of Dr. John: Celebrating Mac & His Music (2016)

As a sidewoman

- Tony Monaco: Master Chops T (Summit Records, 2002)
- Anne Ducros: Close Your Eyes (Dreyfus, 2002)
- Katy Roberts: The Vibe (Autoproduit, 2002)
- The Jungle Book (2016) Original Motion Picture Soundtrack (2017)
