= How I Got Over =

How I Got Over may refer to:

- "How I Got Over" (song), a gospel song written by Clara Ward, 1951
- How I Got Over (album), an album by The Roots, 2010
