= Grammy Award for Best Traditional Gospel Album =

Grammy Award

The Grammy Award for Best Traditional Gospel Album was awarded from 1991 to 2011. A similar award, the Grammy Award for Best Soul Gospel Performance, Traditional was awarded from 1978 to 1983. It was previously known as the award Best Traditional Soul Gospel Album.

According to the category description guide for the 52nd Grammy Awards, the award is reserved for "albums containing at least 51% playing time of newly recorded traditional gospel vocal tracks" performed by "solo artists, duos, groups or choirs/choruses."

The category was discontinued from 2012 in a major overhaul of Grammy categories. From 2012, recordings in this category were shifted to the newly formed Best Gospel Album category.

Shirley Caesar and The Blind Boys of Alabama were the biggest recipients in this category with five wins each.

== Recipients ==
Years reflect the year in which the Grammy Awards were presented, for works released in the previous year.

Year^{[I]}	Performing artists	Work	Nominees	Ref.
1991	Tramaine Hawkins	Tramaine Hawkins Live	Shirley Caesar – I Remember Mama; Ron Winans Family & Friends Choir – Ron Winans Presents Family and Friends Choir II; Mom and Pop Winans – Mom and Pop Winans; The Clark Sisters – Bringing It Back Home	
1992	Mighty Clouds of Joy	Pray For Me	Thomas Whitfield – My Faith; The Jackson Southernaires – Thank You Mamma for Praying for Me; The Williams Brothers – This Is Your Night; Vanessa Bell Armstrong – The Truth About Christmas	
1993	Shirley Caesar	He's Working It Out For You	The Fairfield Four – Standing in the Safety Zone; The Gospel Hummingbirds – Steppin' Out; Albertina Walker – Live; Mom and Pop Winans – For the Rest of My Life	
1994	Shirley Caesar	Stand Still	The Blind Boys of Alabama – Deep River; Dorothy Norwood – Better Days Ahead; The Dixie Hummingbirds – In Good Health; The Canton Spirituals – Live in Memphis	
1995	Albertina Walker	Songs of the Church - Live in Memphis	Rev. James Moore – I Will Trust in the Lord...; Dorothy Norwood – "Live" With the Georgia Mass Choir - Feel Like...; The Williams Brothers – In This Place; Rev. Timothy Wright and the N.Y. Fellowship Mass Choir – Come Thou Almighty King	
1996	Shirley Caesar	Live - He Will Come	Fontella Bass – No Ways Tired; The Blind Boys of Alabama – I Brought Him With Me; Mighty Clouds of Joy – Power; Rev. James Moore with the Mississippi Mass Choir – Live at Jackson State University	
1997	Cissy Houston	Face to Face	Walter Hawkins & the Hawkins Family – New Dawning; Dorothy Norwood – Shake the Devil Off; Various Artists (Mighty Clouds of Joy, The Williams Brothers, and Slim & The Supreme Angels) – Together As One: A Tribute To The Heritage Of Quartet Music; Albertina Walker – Lets Go Back: Live in Chicago	
1998	The Fairfield Four	I Couldn't Hear Nobody Pray	Shirley Caesar – A Miracle in Harlem; T. D. Jakes – Woman, Thou Art Loosed! Songs of Healing and Restoration; Mighty Clouds of Joy – Live in Charleston; Vickie Winans – Live in Detroit	
1999	Cissy Houston	He Leadeth Me	Rance Allen and the Soul Winners' Conference Choir – Just Right for a Miracle; Beverly Crawford – Now That I'm Here; Della Reese – My Soul Feels Better Right Now; Rev. Timothy Wright and the B/J Mass Choir Featuring Myrna Summers – Been There Done That	
2000	Shirley Caesar	Christmas with Shirley Caesar	The Dixie Hummingbirds – Music In The Air; Dottie Peoples – God Can & God Will; Pop Winans & The Winanaires – Uncensored; Vickie Winans – Live In Detroit II	
2001	Shirley Caesar	You Can Make It	Mighty Clouds of Joy – It Was You; Rev. James Moore – Family & Friends Live From Detroit; Aaron Neville – Devotion; Dorothy Norwood – Ole Rickety Bridge; The Williams Brothers – The Concert	
2002	The Blind Boys of Alabama	Spirit of the Century	Shirley Caesar – Hymns; New Life Community Choir featuring John P. Kee – Not Guilty...The Experience; Dottie Peoples – Show Up and Show Out; Richard Smallwood with Vision – Persuaded: Live in D.C.	
2003	The Blind Boys of Alabama	Higher Ground	Dorothy Norwood – Live At Home; The Canton Spirituals – Walking By Faith; Twinkie Clark – Live in Charlotte; Various Artists – Bishop T.D. Jakes Presents Woman Thou Art Loosed - Worship 2002	
2004	The Blind Boys of Alabama	Go Tell It on the Mountain	Sensational Nightingales – Songs To Edify; Aaron Neville – Believe; Various Artists – Gotta Serve Somebody: The Gospel Songs of Bob Dylan; Shirley Caesar & Friends – Shirley Caesar & Friends	
2005	Ben Harper and The Blind Boys of Alabama	There Will Be a Light	The Rance Allen Group – The Live Experience; Dottie Peoples – The Water I Give; Richard Smallwood – The Praise & Worship Songs; The Williams Brothers – Still Here	
2006	Donnie McClurkin	Psalms, Hymns & Spiritual Songs	Shirley Caesar – I Know the Truth; Dorinda Clark-Cole – Live From Houston: The Rose of Gospel; Martha Munizzi – Say the Name; Bishop G.E. Patterson & Congregation – Singing The Old Time Way; Marvin Sapp – Be Exalted	
2007	Israel & New Breed	Alive in South Africa	Donald Lawrence & The Tri-City Singers – Finale: Act One; The Dixie Hummingbirds – Still Keeping it Real; The Caravans – Paved the Way; Byron Cage – An Invitation to Worship	
2008	The Clark Sisters	Live - One Last Time	Donald Lawrence & The Tri-City Singers – The Grand Finale: Encourage Yourself; Smokie Norful – Life Changing; Marvin Sapp – Thirsty; BeBe Winans – Cherch	
2009	The Blind Boys of Alabama	Down in New Orleans	The West Angeles COGIC Mass Choir – Charles E. Blake Presents... No Limit; Voices Of Unity – Deitrick Haddon Presents Together In Worship; Dorinda Clark-Cole – Take It Back; The Brooklyn Tabernacle Choir & Carol Cymbala – I'll Say Yes	
2010	Various Artists	Oh Happy Day: An All-Star Music Celebration	Vickie Winans – How I Got Over; The Williams Brothers – The Journey Continues; Ashley Cleveland – God Don't Never Change; Donald Lawrence – The Law of Confession, Part I	
2011	Patty Griffin	Downtown Church	Karen Clark Sheard – All in One; Marvin Sapp – Here I Am; Vanessa Bell Armstrong – The Experience; Shirley Caesar – A City Called Heaven	

^{^[I]} Each year is linked to the article about the Grammy Awards held that year.

== See also ==
- List of Grammy Award categories
