= A Jazz Celebration of The Allman Brothers Band =

Studio album by Big Band of Brothers
- Released: November 22, 2019
- Recorded: June 2018
- Studio: Bates Brothers Recording, Hueytown, Alabama
- Genre: Jazz
- Length: 62:52
- Label: New West
- Producer: John Harvey, Mark Lanter, Charles Driebe

A Jazz Celebration of The Allman Brothers Band is an album by the Big Band of Brothers. Ten songs made famous by The Allman Brothers Band receive big band arrangements. The album was inspired by Bob Curnow's L.A. Big Band 1994 tribute album The Music of Pat Metheny & Lyle Mays. Like the Allman Brothers, Big Band of Brothers is composed of musicians from the southeastern U.S. The album includes guest appearances by trombonist Wycliffe Gordon, guitarist Jack Pearson, and vocalists Marc Broussard and Ruthie Foster.

== Tour package ==
In October 2020, American Songwriter premiered a live performance of the project from January 2019.

== Critical reception ==
DownBeat magazine editor Bobby Reed wrote, "The album provides a new prism through which to appreciate the music of an iconic band, many of whose founding members are no longer with us". JazzTimes critic Jeff Tamarkin wrote, "That it's a larger ensemble bringing the Allmans' music into the jazz realm, rather than a smaller combo, is a curious but ultimately brilliant ploy." Tom Clarke at Blues Music magazine called the album "a set of songs that mesmerize by their complexity, yet are fluid and easy to enjoy". Jedd Beaudion of PopMatters wrote, "This recording is as entertaining and scintillating as Coltrane's "Live" at the Village Vanguard, the Brothers' own Eat a Peach or those legendary At Fillmore East sets."

== Track listing ==
No.	Title	Writer(s)	Length
1.	"Statesboro Blues"	Blind Willie McTell	5:14
2.	"Don't Want You No More"	Spencer Davis, Edward Hardin	3:48
3.	"It's Not My Cross to Bear"	Gregg Allman	7:52
4.	"Hot 'Lanta"	Duane Allman, Gregg Allman, Dickey Betts, Butch Trucks, Berry Oakley, Jai Johanny Johanson	5:15
5.	"Whipping Post"	Gregg Allman	5:11
6.	"Stand Back"	Gregg Allman	5:35
7.	"Dreams"	Gregg Allman	6:39
8.	"In Memory of Elizabeth Reed"	Betts	7:11
9.	"Don't Keep Me Wonderin'"	Gregg Allman	4:08
10.	"Les Brers in A Minor"	Betts	12:03

== Personnel ==
- Mart Avant – trumpet, flugelhorn
- Rob Alley – trumpet, flugelhorn
- Barney Floyd – trumpet, flugelhorn
- Chris Gordon – trumpet, flugelhorn
- Billy Bargetzi – trombone
- Chad Fisher – trombone
- Bill Huber – trombone
- Brandon Slocumb – bass trombone
- Jimmy Bowland – alto saxophone
- Mace Hibbard – alto saxophone
- Kelley O'Neal – alto saxophone
- Dick Aven – tenor, soprano saxophone
- Nathan McLeod – tenor saxophone
- Steve Collins – baritone saxophone
- Andy Nevala – piano, Hammond B-3, Rhodes
- Matt Casey – guitar
- Tom Wolfe – guitar
- Abe Becker – double bass, bass guitar
- Chris Kozak – double bass, bass guitar
- David Ray – double bass, bass guitar
- Mark Lanter – drums
- Dave Crenshaw – congas, other percussion
- Marc Broussard – vocals
- Ruthie Foster – vocals
- Wycliffe Gordon – soprano trombone
- Jack Pearson – slide guitar
