= Gause Independent School District =

School district in Texas, United States

Address
- 400 College Gause, Texas, 77857; United States

District information
- Type: Public
- Grades: PK–8
- Schools: 1
- NCES District ID: 4820520

Students and staff
- Students: 142 (2023–2024)
- Teachers: 15.92 (on an FTE basis) (2023–2024)
- Staff: 13.79 (on an FTE basis) (2023–2024)
- Student–teacher ratio: 8.92 (2023–2024)

Other information
- Website: www.gauseisd.net

Gause Independent School District is a public school district based in the community of Gause, Texas (USA).

Gause ISD was founded in 1905. The district has one school that serves students in grades pre-kindergarten through eight.

In 2009, the school district was rated "recognized" by the Texas Education Agency.
