= How I Got Over (song) =

Song by Clara Ward
- Written: 1951
- Published: 1951
- Genre: Hymn
- Songwriter: Clara Ward

"How I Got Over" is a Gospel hymn composed and published in 1951 by Clara Ward (1924–1973). Ward's original release sold 1 million copies and is one of the best-selling gospel songs of all time. Other notable recordings of this work have been made by Mahalia Jackson (1951, winner of the Grammy Award for Best Soul Gospel Performance in 1976), and the Blind Boys of Alabama (2008 on their album Down in New Orleans). It was performed by Mahalia Jackson at the historic March on Washington for Jobs and Freedom in 1963 before 250,000 people.

Aretha Franklin recorded an uptempo alternate version of the song for her 1972 album Amazing Grace, with James Cleveland and the Southern California Community Choir. The same arrangement was performed twice in the 1974 Sidney Poitier film Uptown Saturday Night by the film's church choir with an alternate singer (no credits were given) and was produced by Tom Scott who also produced the film's soundtrack.

In 2018, Ward's original rendition was selected for preservation in the National Recording Registry by the Library of Congress as being "culturally, historically, or aesthetically significant".

== Inspirations ==
According to her sister, Willa Ward, the inspiration for this song was an experience Clara Ward, Willa, their mother Gertrude, and members of their singing group had while traveling in the racially segregated Southern States in 1951. En route to Atlanta, Georgia, they were besieged by a group of white men. The men were enraged that black women were riding in a luxury vehicle, a Cadillac, and surrounded their car and terrorized them with racist taunts. The women were rescued when, in a burst of inspiration, Gertrude Ward feigned demonic possession, spewing curses and incantations at the men, who fled.
