= Bobby Floyd (musician) =

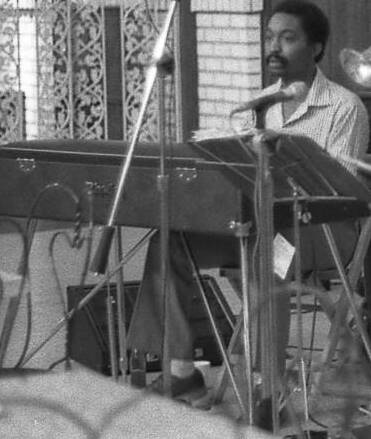
- Floyd in 1979

Background information
- Born: December 24, 1954 (age 70); Marion, Ohio, U.S.
- Genres: Jazz
- Instrument(s): Piano, keyboards, organ
- Years active: 1974–present
- Labels: Summit/Chicken Coup, Cojazz, Gerard
- Member of: Columbus Jazz Orchestra
- Formerly of: Count Basie Orchestra

Bobby Floyd (born December 24, 1954) is an American pianist, organist, keyboardist, bandleader, and composer. Starting in the 1980s, he began a decades-long association with the Columbus Jazz Orchestra. His playing style has been influenced by his church upbringing, and by pianist Erroll Garner.

== Early life ==
Bobby Floyd was born in Marion, Ohio, on December 24, 1954, the son of Vera and Bob Floyd. He started playing piano at age two, and was discovered to have perfect pitch shortly after, starting piano lessons with his tutor L. T. Dukes at five years old. Floyd developed his technique from listening to records of Oscar Peterson, Thelonious Monk, and Erroll Garner, and by age six played weekly at his local church. Floyd would later meet Garner when he was 12. In Marion Harding High School, Floyd played in a trio with Bruce Burton and future Columbus Jazz Orchestra drummer Bob Breithaupt, and studied with the piano teacher Maury Kline. He moved to Columbus in 1973.

== Career ==
Floyd attended Ohio State University starting 1974, where he studied music education but did not graduate, playing with trumpeter Jeff Tyzik and saxophonist Vince Andrews. In 1983, he recorded a series of TV specials, entitled "Special Request", which were syndicated on PBS. From 1984 to 1985, Floyd played piano and organ across Europe and the US in Ray Charles's band, where he opened shows before Charles entered stage, but left the band when his daughter was born. In 2004, Floyd took over as pianist in the Columbus Jazz Orchestra after the death of Hank Marr. In 2012, Floyd joined the Count Basie Orchestra as a pianist, where he was featured on the Grammy-nominated album All About That Basie (2018).

Bobby Floyd currently tours in a trio with Derek DiCenzo on bass and guitar, and Reggie Jackson on drums.

== Personal life ==
Floyd lives in Powell, Ohio, with his wife, Marilyn. They have one daughter, singer Bobbi Townes. One of his brothers, Vic Floyd, is also a pianist.

== Awards ==
- 1986 – WBBY/Michelob "Jazz Search" Competition, as the Bobby Floyd Project, with Jeff Ciampa and Jim Rupp
- 2015 – Lincoln Theater "Walk of Fame" star on sidewalk, for Outstanding Contribution to Jazz
- 2018 – Grammy nomination with the Count Basie Orchestra, All About That Jazz (pianist)
- 2019 – Greater Columbus Arts Council Raymond J. Hanley Award

== Discography ==
=== As a leader ===
- Interpretations (Gerard, 1986)
- Floyd's Finest Gift (CoJazz, 2001)
- Setting the Standards (Bobby Floyd Productions, 2001)
- Notes To and From My Friends (Summit, 2007)

=== As a sideman ===
==== With Vince Andrews ====
- Love, Oh Love (Gerard, 1983),
- Very Convincing (Gerard, 1986)
- Hey, Vince! (Gerard, 1986)

==== With Christian Howes ====
- Confluence (Self-released, 1997)
- Ten Yard (Self-released, 1998)
- Out Of The Blue (Resonance, 2010)

==== With others ====
- Rusty Bryant – Rusty Rides Again (Phoenix Jazz, 1980; CD reissue: HighNote, 2001)
- Pete Mills – Art and Architecture (Summit, 2004)
- Columbus Jazz Orchestra – The Colors of Jazz (Jazz Arts Group, 2006)
- Jamey Aebersold – Feelin' Good! Blues in B-3 (Aebersold Jazz, 2007) - with Dave Stryker, Jonathan Higgins
- Ansyn Banks – Banks Gives Thanks (Resonance, 2011)
- Antonio Hart – Blessings (Jazz Legacy Productions, 2015)
- Count Basie Orchestra – All About That Basie (Concord, 2018)
- Bryan Olsheski – In the Moment (CoJazz, 2019)
- Rich Wiley – Conspiracy (Wise Cat, 2019)
- Dr. John – Ske-Dat-De-Dat: The Spirit of Satch (Concord, 2019)
- Rich Thompson – Who Do You Have To Know (Origin, 2023) - with Corey Christiansen
- Count Basie Orchestra – Basie Swings the Blues (Candid, 2023)
- Thom Rotella – Side Hustle (HighNote, 2024)
