= Go Tell It on the Mountain (album) =

Studio album by The Blind Boys of Alabama
- Released: September 16, 2003
- Recorded: 2003
- Studio: Capitol Studio B (Hollywood)
- Genre: Gospel music
- Length: 45:18
- Label: Real World, Narada
- Producer: John Chelew

The Blind Boys of Alabama chronology
Higher Ground (2002)	Go Tell It on the Mountain (2003)	There Will Be a Light (2004)

Professional ratings
Review scores
Source	Rating
Allmusic	link

Go Tell It on the Mountain is a Grammy Award winning Christmas album by The Blind Boys of Alabama, released in 2003.

== Track listing ==
1. "Last Month of the Year" – 3:03
2. "I Pray on Christmas" (featuring Solomon Burke) – 3:41
3. "Go Tell It on the Mountain" (featuring Tom Waits) – 3:57
4. "Little Drummer Boy" (featuring Michael Franti) – 3:19
5. "In the Bleak Midwinter" (featuring Chrissie Hynde & Richard Thompson) – 4:49
6. "Joy to the World" (featuring Aaron Neville) – 2:25
7. "Born in Bethlehem" (featuring Mavis Staples) – 6:36
8. "The Christmas Song" (featuring Shelby Lynne) – 2:34
9. "Away in a Manger" (featuring George Clinton & Robert Randolph) – 5:22
10. "Oh Come All Ye Faithful" (featuring Me'Shell Ndegeocello) – 2:10
11. "White Christmas" (featuring Les McCann) – 4:03
12. "Silent Night" – 3:19
13. "My Lord, What a Morning" – bonus track

== Personnel ==
The Blind Boys of Alabama

- Bobby Butler
- Clarence Fountain
- George Scott
- Jimmy Carter
- Joey Williams
- Ricky McKinnie
- Tracy Pierce

with:

- Duke Robillard – guitar
- Danny Thompson – double bass
- John Medeski – Hammond B-3 organ
- Michael Jerome – drums

== Charts ==
- 2003 Top Gospel Albums No. 1
- 2004 Top Internet Albums No. 247

== Awards ==
- 2004 Grammy Award for Best Traditional Soul Gospel Album

== DVD ==
A DVD, Blind Boys of Alabama - Go Tell it on the Mountain : Live in New York, was recorded live in concert, in December 2003, at the Beacon Theatre in New York City. The special holiday concert aired on PBS in December 2004. The band performs with Aaron Neville, John Medeski, Duke Robillard, Chrissie Hynde, Mavis Staples, Michael Franti, Robert Randolph, and Charlie Musselwhite.
