= Eric "Ricky" McKinnie =

American gospel singer

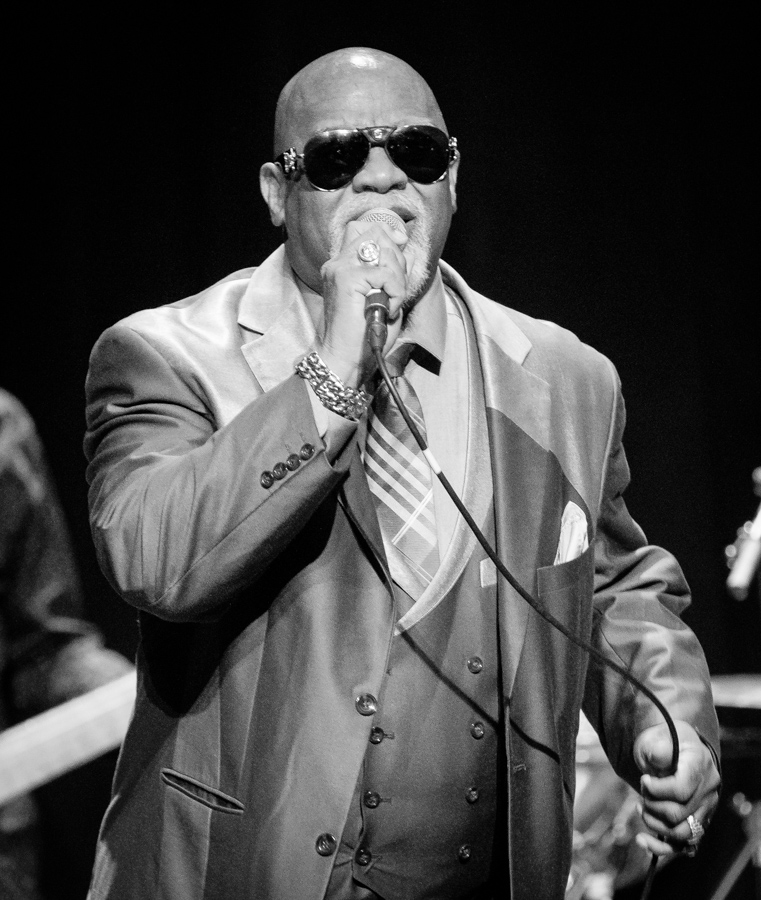
Eric "Ricky" McKinnie performing at Cosmopolite Scene in Oslo (2018)

Eric "Ricky" McKinnie (born July 12, 1952) is a blind American gospel singer, drummer, radio show host, recording studio owner, stage actor, and songwriter, best known for performing with the Blind Boys of Alabama, a gospel group that has won six Grammy Awards and received the Lifetime Achievement Award from the Recording Academy. McKinnie also serves as road business manager for the group. McKinnie has performed with a variety of gospel acts, including the Gospel Keynotes and his own group, the Ricky McKinnie Singers.

== Early life and education ==
McKinnie was born in Atlanta, Georgia to Sarah Frances (née Sharp) McKinnie Shivers and Ed Lee McKinnie. McKinnie and his family lived in the Carver Homes housing projects before moving to the southwestern Atlanta neighborhood of Pittsburgh and later Kirkwood. Early on, McKinnie started playing drums for Thomas A. Dorsey's nephew, Rev. B. J. Johnson Jr., at the Greater Mount Calvary Baptist Church in Atlanta. McKinnie also sang with his older brother. McKinnie attended DeKalb Community College, where he played in the student orchestra.

== Career ==
Still in his teens, in 1970, McKinnie joined Troy Ramey and the Soul Searchers, who recorded for Nashboro Records at the time. He subsequently became a member of the Tyler, Texas-based Gospel Keynotes in 1972, with whom he released the RIAA certified Gold album, Reach Out, and the Platinum album Destiny. During McKinnie's time with the group, the Gospel Keynotes recorded hit singles "Jesus, You Been Good to Me" and "That's My Son Hanging on the Cross." Around the age of twenty, McKinnie began losing his sight due to glaucoma, and was blind by 1975. In response to McKinnie's success with the Gospel Keynotes, Atlanta mayor Maynard Jackson honored McKinnie in 1975, declaring May 10th 'Eric R. McKinnie Day'. Subsequent recognition for his contributions to gospel music came from Georgia Governor George Busbee in 1977.

In 1978, McKinnie founded the Ricky McKinnie Singers, with his mother and brother. This regional group performed at the Georgia Mountain Fair, Six Flags Over Georgia and various churches, recording for the New Orleans label, Southland Records, and opening for artists such as well known gospel singer James Cleveland. In 1979, The Angelic Sound of the Ricky McKinnie Singers began airing on WXAP in Atlanta, and his show, Words and Music for Your Soul, which often featured his mother, Sarah Shivers, aired on WYZE. In the 1980s, McKinnie hosted the radio and television show Rock with Ricky, but was forced to shelve this to work more closely with the Blind Boys of Alabama.

In addition to performing with the Blind Boys of Alabama, McKinnie operates Quality Sound Management, an Atlanta recording studio, which has recorded a number of artists, including Robert Brown and the late Angie Stone.

In 2001, McKinnie received an honorary Doctor of Divinity from Carver Bible College. From a 2006 interview, McKinnie became a part of The History Makers Collection of the Library of Congress.

McKinnie took on the role of manager for the Blind Boys of Alabama in 1997. In 2000 he transitioned to Business Manager, a title he still holds today. Following the retirement of longtime group member and group leader, Jimmy Carter, McKinnie became the acting group leader in 2023.

McKinnie, who was not with the Blind Boys of Alabama during productions of Lee Breuer and Bob Telson's The Gospel at Colonus in Atlanta in 1987 and on Broadway in 1988, performed with the group on September 4–9, 2018 at Central Park's Delacorte Theatre in New York in a limited run of free shows that prompted celebration among fans and critics alike.

Ricky McKinnie has been included in two volumes of the New York Times best-selling Six-Word Memoirs Series, including Six Words: Fresh Off the Boat: Stories of Immigration, Identity, and Coming to America (2017), for which McKinnie was a guest speaker at Six Words Fresh Off the Boat: A Backstory Show in Atlanta on May 23, 2018, at the Jimmy Carter Presidential Library in Atlanta.

As a member of the Blind Boys of Alabama, McKinnie is a spokesperson for Feed the Hungry Campaign, and supports the Diabetes Foundation, the Glaucoma Foundation and the Atlanta-based Family and Friends organization, which was founded by his family. McKinnie is also the founder and president of Atlanta-based nonprofit, Traditions Cultural Arts, Inc., an organization devoted to promoting and preserving traditional art forms by upholding the legacies of industry veterans and uniting them with their up-and-coming counterparts to provide opportunities for fellowship, sponsorship and mentorship.
