= Atom Bomb (album) =

Studio album by The Blind Boys of Alabama
- Released: March 15, 2005
- Genre: Gospel music
- Length: 35:20
- Label: Real World Records
- Producer: John Chelew

The Blind Boys of Alabama chronology
Live at the Apollo (2005)	Atom Bomb (2005)	Down in New Orleans (2008)

Professional ratings
Review scores
Source	Rating
Allmusic	3.5/5 stars
Rolling Stone	3/5 stars

Atom Bomb is an album by The Blind Boys of Alabama, released in 2005.

== Track listing ==
1. "(Jesus Hits Like the) Atom Bomb" – 2:27
2. "Demons" – 4:30 (featuring Gift of Gab)
3. "Talk About Suffering" – 4:13
4. "I Know I've Been Converted" – 2:41
5. "Old Blind Barnabas" – 3:31
6. "Spirit in the Sky" – 3:04
7. "Faith & Grace" – 3:07
8. "New Born Soul" – 2:54
9. "Presence of the Lord" – 4:59
10. "Moses" – 3:55

== Awards ==
In 2006, the album won a Dove Award for Traditional Gospel Album of the Year at the 37th GMA Dove Awards.
