= Andy Nevala =

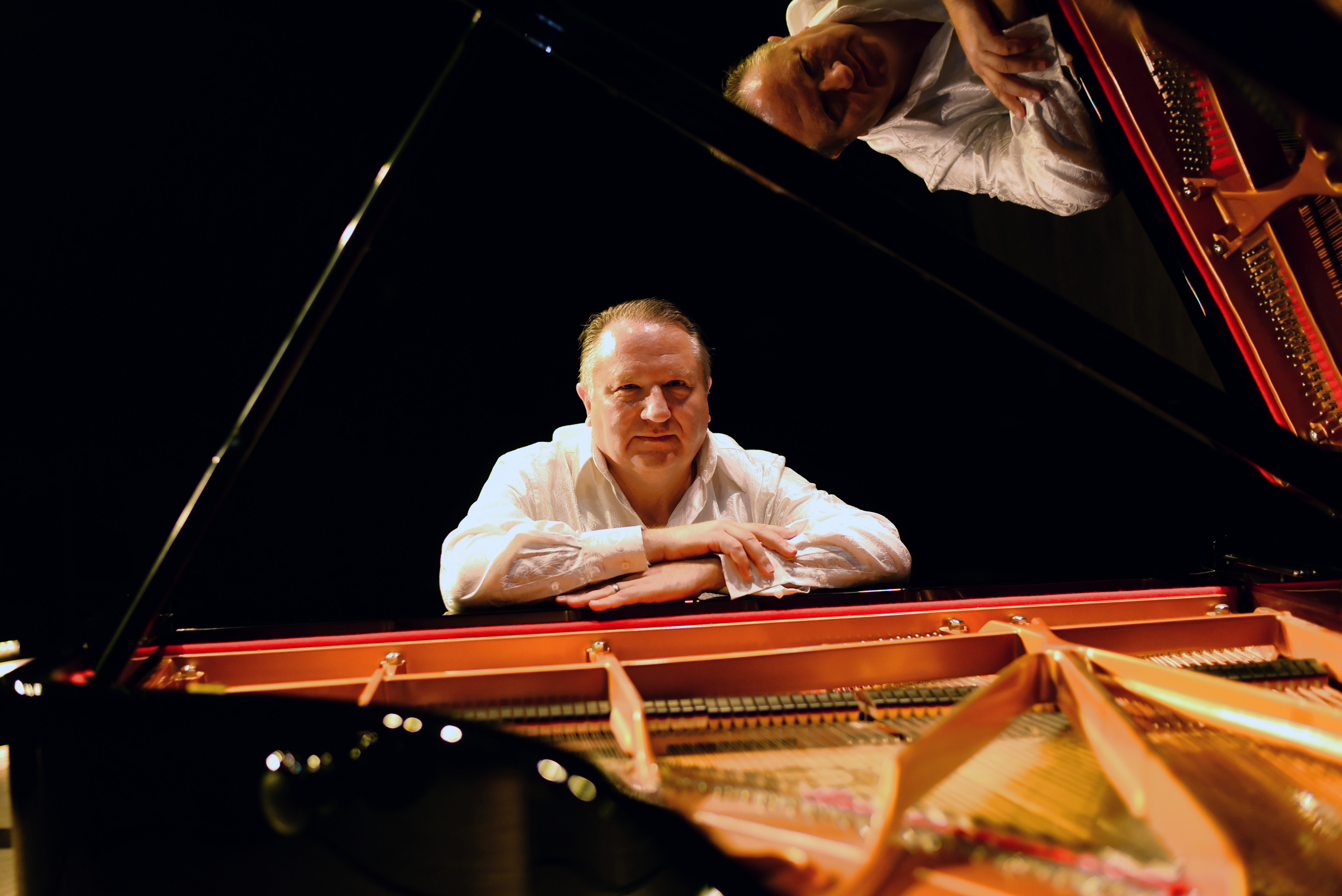

Background information
- Born: Andrew Eric Nevala; May 9, 1972 (age 54); Aurora, Colorado
- Genres: Jazz, Latin jazz
- Occupations: Musician, educator, arranger
- Instruments: Piano, keyboards
- Years active: 1994–present
- Labels: ZoHo, Girod, New West, Capri
- Formerly of: The Glenn Miller Orchestra, Eddie Turner, The Rhythm Mob, Rebecca Scott, Conjunto Colores
- Website: andynevalamusic.com

Andrew Eric Nevala (born May 9, 1972) is an American jazz pianist and music educator who was born in Aurora, Colorado. A son of a military veteran, he attended grade school in Hahn, Germany, and then Sumter, South Carolina, and graduated from Mountain Home High School, Idaho.

== Background ==
Nevala began studying piano at an early age and later earned a Bachelor of Arts in Music degree from Boise State University, a Masters in Music Theory and Composition from the University of Northern Colorado, and a doctorate in piano performance with a jazz emphasis from the University of Colorado, Boulder, where he was the first doctoral Student in the Jazz Studies Program. He studied jazz piano with Chuck Smith, Pat Bianchi, Chip Stephens, and Art Lande, and classical piano with Del Parkinson and Robert Spillman.

== Career ==
He is currently Director of Jazz Studies at Jacksonville State University, in Jacksonville, Alabama and was formerly Coordinator of Jazz Studies at California State University Stanislaus in Turlock, California. At JSU, he oversaw the program grow from two jazz bands and a combo when he arrived, to four jazz ensembles, six combos, a Latin Ensemble, and a vocal Jazz Ensemble. Under his direction, JSU Jazz Ensemble I has won two Downbeat Student Music Awards, and his groups have performed at the Jazz Educators Network Conference and the Alabama Music Educators Conference.

As a professional musician, he has toured with the Glenn Miller Orchestra, Steve Lippia, Atlanta Latin Jazz Orchestra, Eddie Turner, the ProJazzTrio, and the Andy Nevala Quartet.

== Awards ==
=== Downbeat Student Music Awards ===
- 2022 Outstanding Performance, Undergraduate Big Band, Jacksonville State University Jazz Ensemble I, director
- 2015 Outstanding Performance, Undergraduate Big Band, Jacksonville State University Jazz Ensemble I, director
- 2003 Arrangement, "Autumn Leaves"
- 2003 Outstanding Performance, Big Band, University of Colorado Jazz Ensemble I, Pianist
- 2002 Outstanding Performance, Original Composition, ‘Nocturne’, Composer/Performer
- 2002 Outstanding Performance, College Instrumental Group, University of Colorado Combo 1, Pianist
- 2000 Best College Jazz/Rock Group, UNC Combo I, Director and performer
- 2000 Best Vocal Jazz Group, UNC Sus 4, Rehearsal Pianist and performer
- 1999 Best College Jazz/Rock Performance, UNC Combo II, Director and performer
- 1999 Best Vocal Jazz Group, UNC Sus 4, Rehearsal Pianist and performer

== Discography ==
- 2019, Big Band of Brothers, A Jazz Celebration of the Allman Brothers Band, New West Records
- 2018, Nevala, Brothers, Carswell, Kozak, Three Times Two, Girod Records
- 2014, Orquesta Dharma, La Clave Del Gumbo
- 2011, Orquesta Dharma, Road Warrior
- 2007, Alone Together, Capri Records
- 2006, University of Colorado Jazz Ensemble I, CU Over The Rainbow,

University of Colorado College of Music, Jazz Studies Program

- 2005, ProJazzTrio, Live From Venezuela
- 2005, Conjunto Colores, Con Colores Se Goza
- 2004, University of Colorado Jazz Ensemble I, CU ‘Round Midnight,

University of Colorado College of Music, Jazz Studies Program

- 2003, One For the Road, The Cornerstone Trio, Glenn Miller Productions
- 2002, Conjunto Colores, On Another Level
- 2000, Waiting in the Alley
- 2002, Conjunto Colores, Lo Mejor Del Conjunto Colores
- 2001, University of Colorado Jazz Ensemble I, Boulder Buff – A Tribute

To Glenn Miller, University of Colorado College of Music

- 2000, UNC Jazz Lab Band I, Alive XVII, United Jazz Artists
- 2000, Suzanne Morrison, From Where you Are
- 2000, Carrie Schultz, Introducing Carrie Schultz
- 1999, Conjunto Colores, MI Planeta
- 1998, Steve Roach, No Way Out
- 1997, Rebecca Scott Decision, United
- 1997, Robert Walker, Art of the Groove
