= Gause (surname) =

Gause is a surname. Notable people with the surname include:

- Fred Gause (1879–1944) Justice of the Indiana Supreme Court
- Georgy Gause (1910–1986), Russian biologist
- Jesse Gause (1785–c. 1836), early leader in the Latter Day Saint movement
- Nora Trueblood Gause, (1851-1955), American humanitarian
- Paul Gause (born 1986), American college basketball player
- Quentin Gause (born 1992), American football player
- Rufus Hollis Gause (1925–2015), US theologian
