= Live at the Apollo (Ben Harper and The Blind Boys of Alabama album) =

Live album by Ben Harper and The Blind Boys of Alabama
- Released: March 14, 2005 (CD)
- Recorded: October 2004
- Venue: Apollo Theater (Harlem, New York)
- Genre: Gospel, gospel blues, blues rock
- Length: 73:53
- Label: Virgin
- Producer: Jean-Pierre Plunier

Ben Harper chronology
There Will Be a Light (2004)	Live at the Apollo (2005)	Both Sides of the Gun (2006)

The Blind Boys of Alabama chronology
There Will Be a Light (2004)	Live at the Apollo (2005)	Atom Bomb (2005)

Live at the Apollo was a concert by Ben Harper and The Blind Boys of Alabama filmed at the Apollo Theater (Harlem, New York), on October 12, 2004 and released as a DVD and a CD.

The DVD was released on March 29, 2005 and the CD on March 14, 2005.

== CD Material ==
The songs on the CD are the same as those on the DVD, which are listed below.

== DVD material ==
Concert songs

1. "11th Commandment"
2. "Well, Well, Well"
3. "I Want To Be Ready"
4. "Take My Hand"
5. "Picture of Jesus"
6. "Church House Steps"
7. "Give a Man a Home"
8. "Wicked Man"
9. "Mother Pray"
10. "I Shall Not Walk Alone"
11. "Church On Time"
12. "Where Could I Go"
13. "There Will Be a Light"
14. "Satisfied Mind"

Approximate concert time: 1:17:00

Making of the Album

(Approximate run time: 9:36)

Behind the Scenes

(Approximate run time: 14:38)

Photo Slideshow

(Approximate run time: 1:30)

DVD total approximate run time: 1:45:00
