= Ruthie Foster =

American blues musician, singer, and songwriter

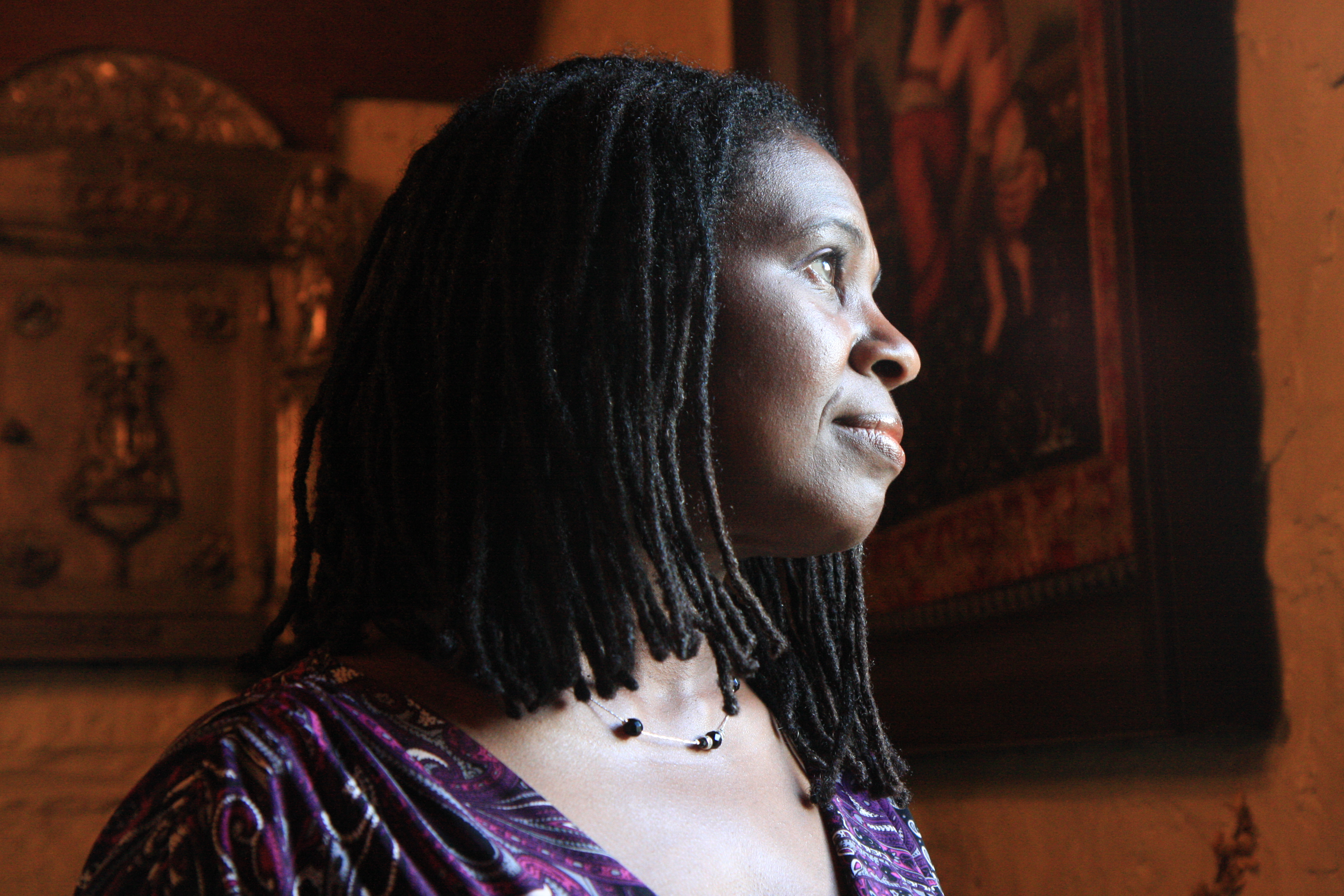
- Foster in 2011

Background information
- Born: Ruthie Cecelia Foster; February 10, 1964 (age 62); Gause, Texas, U.S.
- Genres: Blues, folk, gospel blues
- Occupations: Musician, songwriter
- Instruments: Vocals, guitar
- Years active: 1997–present
- Labels: Sun Records, Blue Corn Music, M.O.D. Records
- Website: ruthiefoster.com

Ruthie Cecelia Foster (born February 10, 1964) is an American singer-songwriter of blues and folk music. She mixes a wide palette of American song forms, from gospel and blues to jazz, folk and soul. She has often been compared to Bonnie Raitt and Aretha Franklin. Foster has been nominated for multiple Grammy Awards for Best Blues Album and Best Contemporary Blues Album, and won her first Grammy on February 2, 2025.

== Life and career ==
Foster is from Gause, Texas, and comes from a family of gospel singers. At the age of fourteen, Foster was a soloist in her hometown choir and was certain that her future would revolve around music. After high school, she moved to Waco, Texas, to attend McLennan Community College where her studies concentrated in music and audio engineering. She began fronting a blues band, learning how to command a stage in the bars of Texas.

Hoping to travel and gain a wider world perspective, Foster joined the United States Navy, and soon began singing in the naval band Pride which played pop and funk hits at recruitment drives in the southeastern United States. Following her tour of duty, Foster headed to New York City where she became a regular performer at various local folk venues. Atlantic Records heard of Foster's talent and offered her a recording deal with the intent of cultivating her as a budding pop star, but Foster was not interested in a pop career, preferring instead to explore the various strains of American roots music that had informed her childhood. When her mother fell ill in 1993, Foster left New York and her recording deal and returned to Texas to be with her family. She began working as a camera operator and production assistant at a television station in College Station, Texas, while she cared for her mother who died in 1996.

== Career ==
In 1997, Foster self-released the album Full Circle, the success of which paved the way to a long relationship with the record label Blue Corn Music.

Blue Corn released the follow-up album Crossover in 1999, Runaway Soul in 2002, and Stages (featuring a series of live tracks) in 2004. Foster's next release was Heal Yourself in 2006, followed by the studio album The Phenomenal Ruthie Foster in 2008, which was produced by Papa Mali. In 2009, Blue Corn released The Truth According to Ruthie Foster, which was produced by Grammy-winning producer Chris Goldsmith and recorded at Ardent Studios in Memphis. The Truth According to Ruthie Foster earned her a Grammy Award nomination for Best Contemporary Blues Album. A second album of Foster's live performances, Live At Antone's (CD and DVD), was released in 2011. In 2012, Blue Corn released the studio album Let It Burn, which featured special guests the Blind Boys of Alabama, William Bell and the rhythm section of the Funky Meters, and was produced by Grammy Award winner John Chelew. Let It Burn earned Foster a second Grammy nomination, this time for Best Blues Album, and was the vehicle for numerous Blues Music Awards won by Foster.

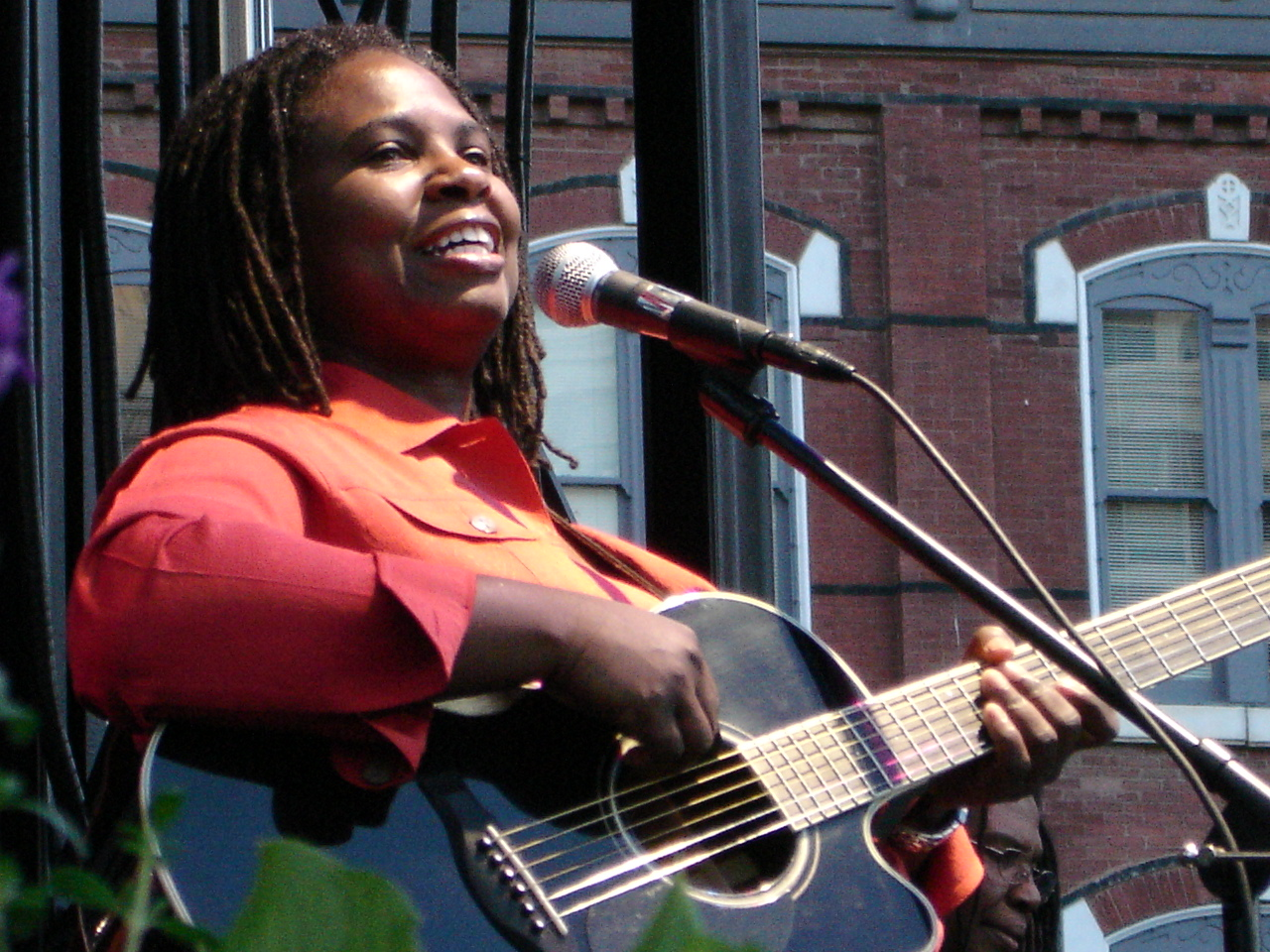
Foster in 2008

Foster's awards list includes three Grammy nominations (Let It Burn for Best Blues Album, The Truth According to Ruthie Foster for Best Contemporary Blues Album, and Promise of a Brand New Day for Best Blues Album), her numerous wins at the Blues Music Awards, including three awards for Best Female Vocalist and one for DVD of the Year for Live At Antone's, and Foster's crown for Best Female Vocalist at the 2013 Austin Music Awards. In 2016, she was nominated for two Living Blues Awards and won the Koko Taylor Award for Best Traditional Female Blues Artist. Her list of honors also include a nomination from the Living Blues Awards for Best Live Performer.

Foster performed with the Allman Brothers Band in 2012 at their annual Beacon Theatre run in New York City. She sang on four songs, including a cover version of "The Weight" on which she traded verses with Susan Tedeschi. She has toured with the Blind Boys of Alabama as well as Warren Haynes and also appears on Haynes' album Man In Motion. She was featured in February 2013 as a special guest on House of Blues and Elwood Blue's radio show, The BluesMobile, as well as an appearance in November 2012 in Austin Live: Tick Tock, a video short produced by the City of Austin. She performed at the Texas State Society of Washington D.C.'s Presidential Inauguration Ball in January 2013.

Foster continues to tour extensively around the world. As of 2016, her shows have spanned across the U.S., Italy, Germany, Spain, and Cuba.

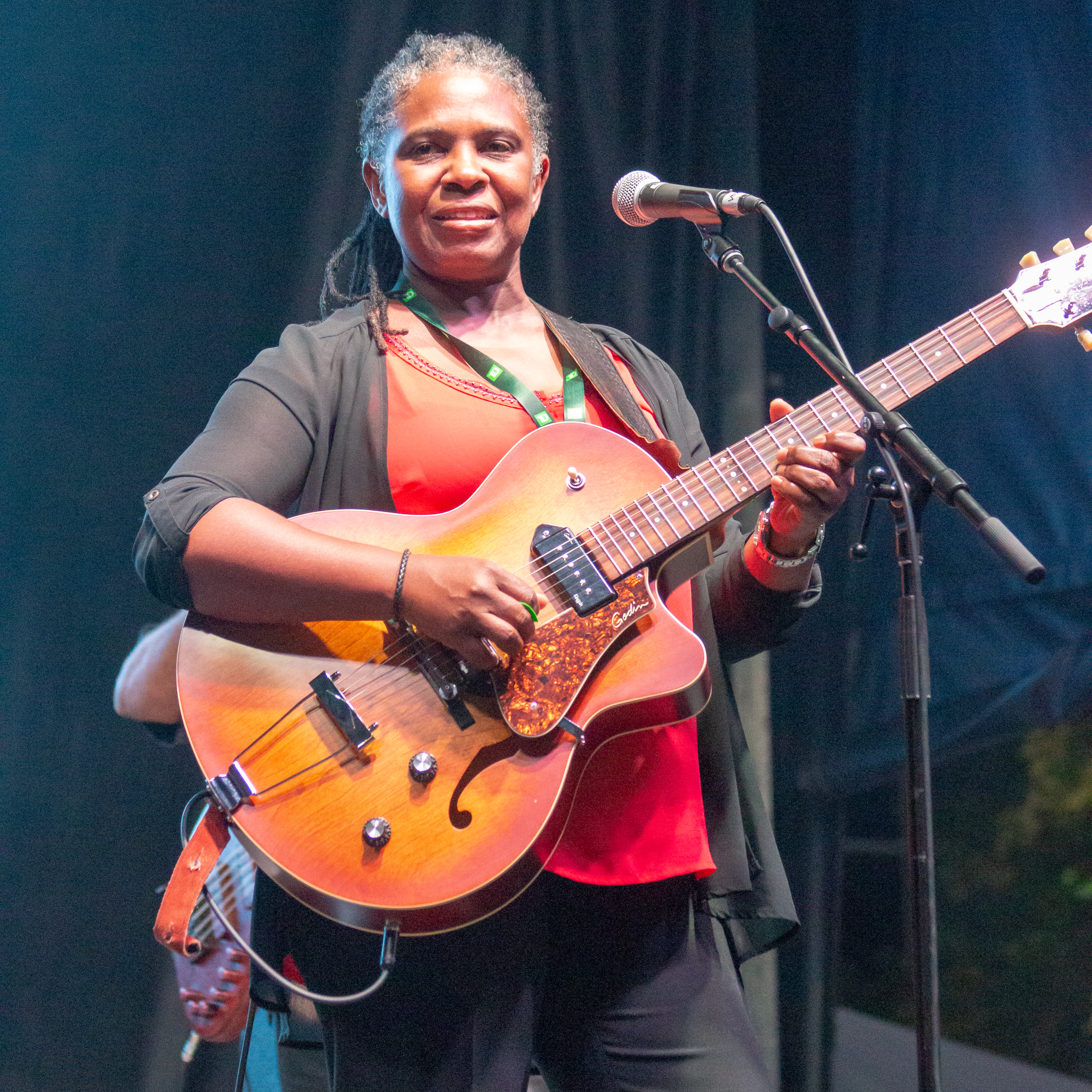
Foster performing at the Kitchener Blues Festival 2018

She announced details for a 2017 album during an in-depth career retrospective interview with The Pods & Sods Network in November 2016. That album, Joy Comes Back, was released on March 24, 2017, via Blue Corn Records, and included collaborations with several artists, including Derek Trucks of the Tedeschi Trucks Band. Following Hurricane Harvey which damaged many coastal cities in Foster's home state of Texas, she was invited to participate in a benefit concert including Bonnie Raitt, Willie Nelson, Paul Simon, and James Taylor. Another significant moment was Foster's performance at Carnegie Hall in February 2018. Foster was also awarded one of US Artists' fellowship awards, which recognized her contributions to her field, accompanied by an unrestricted $50,000 award.

Foster earned the 2025 Grammy Award for Best Contemporary Blues Album for her album Mileage.

== Discography ==
- Full Circle (1997) : M.O.D. Records
- Crossover (1999) : M.O.D. Records
- Runaway Soul (2002) : Blue Corn Music
- Stages (2004) : Blue Corn Music
- The Phenomenal Ruthie Foster (2007) : Blue Corn Music
- The Truth According to Ruthie Foster (2009) : Blue Corn Music
- Live at Antone's (2011) : Blue Corn Music (CD and DVD)
- Let It Burn (2012) : Blue Corn Music
- Promise of a Brand New Day (2014) : Blue Corn Music
- Joy Comes Back (2017) : Blue Corn Music
- Live at the Paramount (2020) : Blue Corn Music
- Healing Time (2022) : Blue Corn Music
- Mileage (2024) : Sun Records
- Just Say Yes (2026) : Sun Records

== Awards and honors ==
- 2008 Blues Music Awards Nominee – Traditional Blues Female Artist of the Year
- 2009 Blues Music Awards Nominee – Traditional Blues Female Artist of the Year
- 2010 Grammy Award Nominee - The Truth According to Ruthie Foster nominated for Best Contemporary Blues Album
- 2010 Blues Music Awards Winner – Contemporary Blues Female Artist of the Year
- 2010 Living Blues Critics' Poll Winner – Blues Artist of the Year (Female)
- 2011 Blues Music Awards Winner – Koko Taylor Award for Traditional Blues Female Artist of the Year
- 2011 Living Blues Awards Nominee – Blues Artist of the Year (Female)
- 2012 Blues Music Awards
  - Winner: Koko Taylor Award for Traditional Blues Female Artist of the Year
  - Winner: DVD of the Year for Live at Antone's
  - Nominee: B.B. King Entertainer of the Year
- 2012 Grammy Award Nominee – Let It Burn nominated for Best Blues Album
- 2013 Blues Music Awards Winner – Koko Taylor Award for Traditional Blues Female Artist of the Year
- 2014 Grammy Award Nominee - Promise of a Brand New Day nominated for Best Blues Album
- 2015 Blues Music Awards Winner – Koko Taylor Award for Traditional Blues Female Artist of the Year
- 2016 Living Blues Award Nominee - Blues Artist of the Year (Female) and Best Live Performer
- 2016 Blues Music Awards Winner – Koko Taylor Award for Traditional Blues Female Artist of the Year
- 2018 US Artists Fellowship Award
- 2018 Blues Music Award Winner - Koko Taylor Award for Traditional Blues Female Artist of the Year
- 2019 Texas Music Hall of Fame Inductee (Austin Music Awards)
- 2019 Blues Music Award Winner - Koko Taylor Award (Traditional Blues Female)
- 2023 Blues Music Award Winner - Contemporary Blues Female Artist of the Year
- 2025 Grammy Award winner - Mileage won for Best Contemporary Blues Album
