= Gause, Texas =

- Unincorporated community Census-designated place
- Location within Texas Location within the United States
- Country: United States
- State: Texas
- County: Milam
- Elevation: 371 ft (113 m)

Population (2020)
  - Total: 275
- Time zone: UTC-6 (Central (CST))
  - Summer (DST): UTC-5 (CDT)
- GNIS feature ID: 1357931

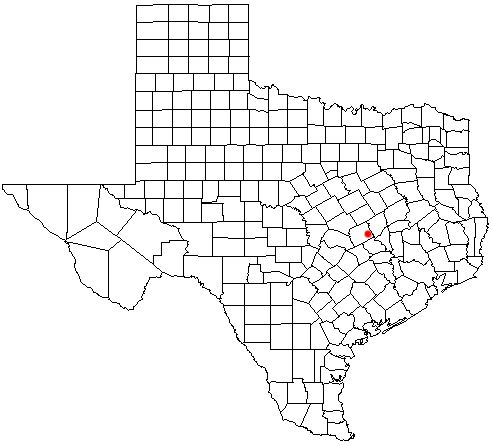
Location of Gause in the state of Texas

Gause is an unincorporated community in Milam County, Texas, United States. According to the Handbook of Texas, the community had an estimated population of 400 in 2000. For statistical purposes, the United States Census Bureau first defined Gause as a census-designated place (CDP) in the 2020 census with a population of 275.

== Geography ==
Gause is situated along U.S. Highway 79/190, 16 miles southeast of Cameron and 29 miles west of Bryan.

Sugarloaf Mountain, the highest point in Milam County, is near Gause. Sugarloaf, a 60-acre property (24 ha), was purchased by the Tonkawa Tribe of Oklahoma from private owners, in commemoration of its status as a site sacred to the Tonkawa. Sugarloaf will become part of a historical park.

== History ==
The community is named for William J. Gause, a settler who moved to the area in 1872, and built a home out of lumber hauled from Montgomery. In 1873, he gave right-of-way and 100 acres (0.40 km^{2}) of land to the International-Great Northern Railroad. This caused the area to grow and a post office opened in 1874. A schoolhouse that doubled as a church was built in 1876. Gause had about 300 residents in 1884, as well as two steam-powered cotton gins and two churches. Gause was a shipping point for Milam County farmers who shipped corn, cotton, and cottonseed oil. The Gause Independent School District was established in 1905.

The population reached its peak around 1915, when 1,000 people lived in the community. Gause slowly declined over the next few decades. Its bank was discontinued in 1927 after 17 years in operation. The combination of a decline in the number of businesses in Gause and the introduction of the automobile precipitated further downturns in the local economy. By the 1960s, the community had 278 residents, down from 750 in the 1940s. The population began to rebound in the late 1980s as more people chose to live in Gause and commute to jobs in nearby industrial plants. In 1990, Gause had 400 residents and eight businesses. The population remained unchanged as of 2000. Despite its unincorporated status, Gause continues to have a functioning post office (zip code:77857).

== Education ==
Public education in the community of Gause is provided by the Gause Independent School District. The district operates a single campus that serves an estimated 150 students in prekindergarten through grade eight.

== Demographics ==
Historical population
Census	Pop.	Note	%±
2020	275		—
U.S. Decennial Census; 1850–1900 1910; 1920 1930 1940; 1950 1960 1970; 1980 1990 2000; 2010 2020

Gause first appeared as a census designated place in the 2020 U.S. census.

=== 2020 census ===
Gause CDP, Texas – Racial and ethnic composition Note: the US Census treats Hispanic/Latino as an ethnic category. This table excludes Latinos from the racial categories and assigns them to a separate category. Hispanics/Latinos may be of any race.
Race / Ethnicity (NH = Non-Hispanic)	Pop 2020	% 2020
White alone (NH)	215	78.18%
Black or African American alone (NH)	14	5.09%
Native American or Alaska Native alone (NH)	2	0.73%
Asian alone (NH)	0	0.00%
Native Hawaiian or Pacific Islander alone (NH)	0	0.00%
Other race alone (NH)	0	0.00%
Multiracial (NH)	16	5.82%
Hispanic or Latino (any race)	28	10.18%
Total	275	100.00%

== Notable people ==
- Lance Archer (b. 1977) is a professional wrestler, currently signed to All Elite Wrestling.
- Ruthie Foster (b. 1964) is a singer-songwriter of blues and folk music.
- Ox Miller (1915–2007) was a professional baseball pitcher, chiefly for the St. Louis Browns.
- Jo-Jo Moore (1908–2001) was a Major League Baseball outfielder who played for the New York Giants and Cincinnati Reds
- Bob Wills (1905–1975) was a Western swing musician, songwriter, and bandleader for Bob Wills and his Texas Playboys.
