= Down in New Orleans =

Studio album by The Blind Boys of Alabama
- Released: 29 January 2008
- Genre: Gospel
- Length: 42:04
- Label: Time-Life
- Producer: Chris Goldsmith

The Blind Boys of Alabama chronology
Atom Bomb (2005)	Down in New Orleans (2008)

Down in New Orleans is a gospel album by The Blind Boys of Alabama, released in 2008. It won the award for Best Traditional Gospel Album at the 51st Annual Grammy Awards. At the 40th GMA Dove Awards, the album was named the Traditional Gospel Album of the Year, and the track "Free at Last" was the Traditional Gospel Recorded Song of the Year.

Down in New Orleans debuted on the New Zealand Album Charts at number 33 on 13 April 2009.

== Critical reception ==
Reviewer Wilson McBee summarized the album thus: "In response to Katrina's disaster of bibilical [sic] proportions, the Blind Boys have made a moving tribute to the city, its people, and its music on Down in New Orleans, and if the album is neither a classic of New Orleans jazz nor of Southern gospel, it reminds us of the deep connections that have always existed between the two genres."

Jessica Lopa wrote, "With its twelve tracks, each one a definitive expression of the ageless story of an honest life and its reaping, Down in New Orleans is a positive force characterized by a wealth of musical ability."

Andrew Gilstrap wrote that "Down in New Orleans isn't as slick as recent Blind Boys efforts — partly because Carter's voice holds more rasp than [absent lead vocalist Clarence] Fountain's — but it successfully blends the group's deep gospel roots with the city's musical identity."

Robin Denselow found that "This is a Blind Boys album with an intriguing new twist"

In his critical review, Andy Gill wrote that "only a couple of tracks – "You Got To Move", given a revivalist treatment, and a version of Curtis Mayfield's "A Prayer" featuring genuinely moving vocal interplay – come up to the group's usual standard".

== Track listing ==
All tracks traditional; except where indicated

1. "Free At Last" – 3:32
2. "Let's Make a Better World" (Earl King) – 3:19 (with Hot 8 Brass Band)
3. "How I Got Over" – 5:03
4. "You Got to Move" – 3:35 (with Bennie Pete, Carl LeBlanc)
5. "Across the Bridge" (Walter Scott) – 3:41 (with Preservation Hall Jazz Band)
6. "You Better Mind" – 3:49 (with Carl LeBlanc)
7. "Down by the Riverside" – 3:51 (with Allen Toussaint, Preservation Hall Jazz Band)
8. "If I Could Help Somebody" (Marion Williams) – 2:28 (with Allen Toussaint)
9. "Uncloudy Day" – 2:55 (with Preservation Hall Jazz Band)
10. "A Prayer" (Curtis Mayfield) – 3:30
11. "I've Got a Home" – 2:51
12. "I'll Fly Away" (Albert E. Brumley) – 3:30 (with Hot 8 Brass Band)

== Awards ==
The album won a Dove Award for Traditional Gospel Album of the Year at the 40th GMA Dove Awards.
