= There Will Be a Light =

Studio album by Ben Harper and The Blind Boys of Alabama
- Released: September 21, 2004
- Genre: Blues, gospel
- Length: 38:50
- Label: Virgin
- Producer: Ben Harper & the Innocent Criminals

Ben Harper chronology
Diamonds On the Inside (2003)	There Will Be a Light (2004)	Live at the Apollo (2005)

The Blind Boys of Alabama chronology
Go Tell It on the Mountain (2003)	There Will Be a Light (2004)	Live at the Apollo (2005)

Professional ratings
Review scores
Source	Rating
Allmusic	4/5 stars

There Will Be a Light is a gospel album by Ben Harper and The Blind Boys of Alabama, released in 2004. It is Harper's sixth album.

This album earned a Grammy award for Best Gospel album while Harper also won a Grammy for the track, "11th Commandment".

== Track listing ==
All songs written by Ben Harper except as noted.

1. "Take My Hand" – 3:54
2. "Wicked Man" – 3:33
3. "Where Could I Go" (Marc Ford, Ben Harper, Jason Yates) – 4:09
4. "Church House Steps" – 4:46
5. "11th Commandment" (Harper, The Blind Boys of Alabama) – 1:34
6. "Well, Well, Well" (Bob Dylan, Danny O'Keefe) – 3:15
7. "Pictures of Jesus" – 3:45
8. "Satisfied Mind" (Red Hayes, Jack Rhodes) – 3:15
9. "Mother Pray" (James Rowe, John W. Vaughan) – 3:00
10. "There Will Be a Light" – 3:22
11. "Church on Time" – 4:17

== Personnel ==
- Ben Harper & the Innocent Criminals
- Bobby Butler
- Oliver Charles
- Rock Deadrick
- Clarence Fountain
- Ricke McKinnie
- Leon Mobley
- Juan Nelson
- Tracie Pierce
- Michael Ward
- Joe "Jackson Joe" Williams
- Jason Yates
- Marc Ford

=== Production ===
- Producer: Ben Harper & the Innocent Criminals
- Executive producer: Chris Goldsmith
- Engineers: Mike Glines, Jimmy Hoyson
- Mixing: Jimmy Hoyson
- Arranger: Ben Harper & the Innocent Criminals
- Design: Jason Yates
- Artwork: Jason Yates
- Photography: Steve Sherman

== Charts ==
=== Weekly charts ===
Weekly chart performance for There Will Be a Light
Chart (2004)	Peak position
Australian Albums (ARIA)	6
Austrian Albums (Ö3 Austria)	37
Belgian Albums (Ultratop Flanders)	50
Belgian Albums (Ultratop Wallonia)	19
French Albums (SNEP)	1
German Albums (Offizielle Top 100)	73
Italian Albums (FIMI)	1
New Zealand Albums (RMNZ)	7
Portuguese Albums (AFP)	7
Swiss Albums (Schweizer Hitparade)	3
US Billboard 200	81
US Top Gospel Albums (Billboard)	1

=== Year-end charts ===
2004 year-end chart performance for There Will Be a Light
Chart (2004)	Position
Australian Albums (ARIA)	79
French Albums (SNEP)	65

2005 year-end chart performance for There Will Be a Light
Chart (2005)	Position
French Albums (SNEP)	152

== Certifications and sales ==
Certifications and sales for There Will Be a Light
Region	Certification	Certified units/sales
Australia (ARIA)	Gold	35,000^{^}
France (SNEP)	2× Gold	200,000^{*}
United States	—	197,000
^{*} Sales figures based on certification alone.^{^} Shipments figures based on certification alone.
