= Black Violin =

American hip hop group

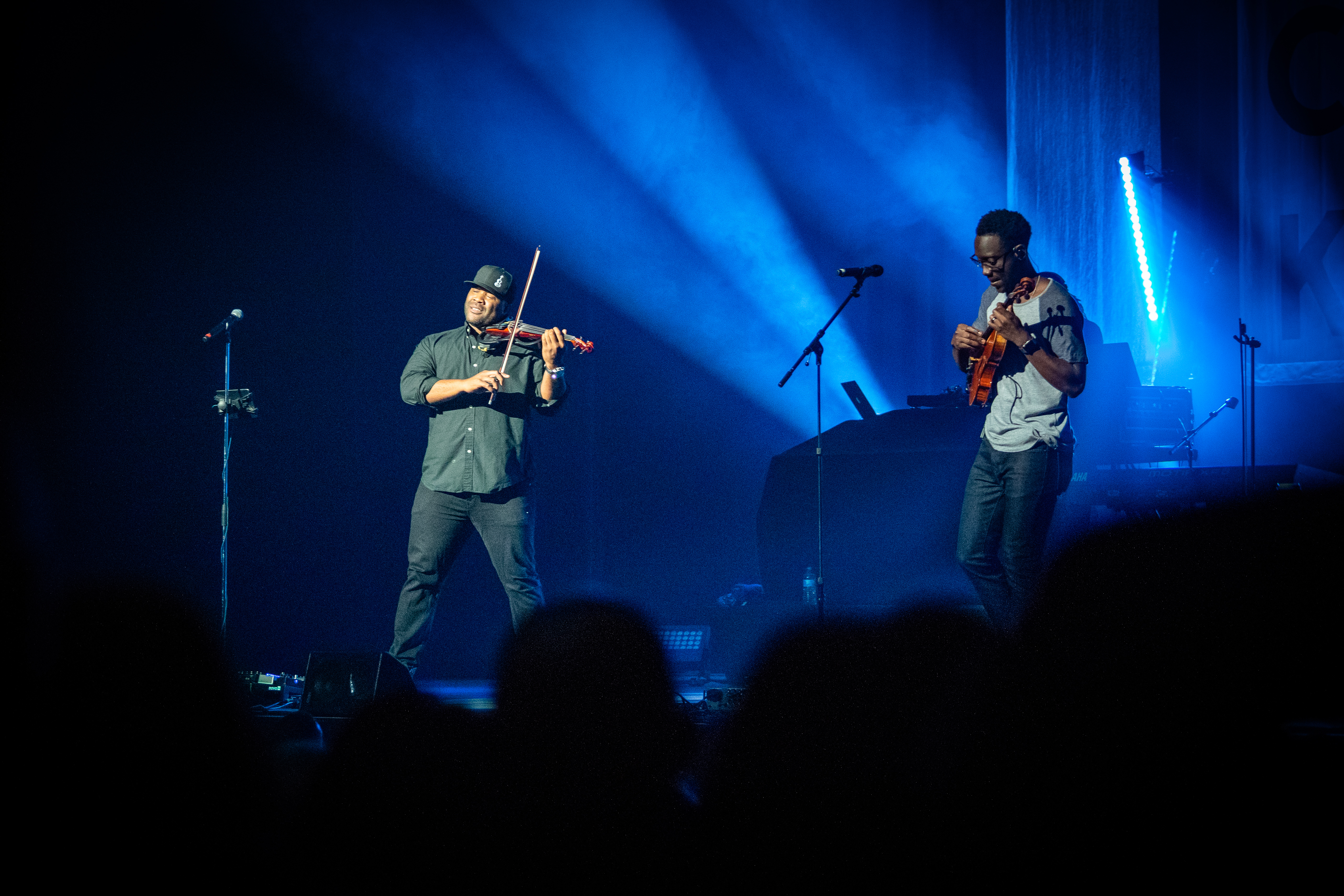
- Black Violin Live in Dubai in 2007

Background information
- Origin: Fort Lauderdale, Florida, United States
- Genres: Jazz, Hip hop, Funk, Classical, Modern classical, Fusion
- Years active: 2004 – present
- Labels: Dknex Music; Di Versatile Inc, Deutsche Grammophon/Universal Classics
- Members: Wil B Kev Marcus; DJ SPS; Nat Stokes
- Website: blackviolin.net

Black Violin is an American hip hop duo from Fort Lauderdale, Florida comprising two classically trained string instrumentalists, Kevin Sylvester and Wilner Baptiste, who go by the stage names Kev Marcus and Wil B. Kev Marcus plays the violin, and Wil B. plays the viola.

They developed an act covering hip-hop songs on their violins, which became popular in local clubs. Two years after sending in a tape to Showtime at the Apollo, they were invited to appear on the show—which they won and kept winning.

They were approached by the manager of Alicia Keys, who asked them to perform with the singer on the Billboard Awards. Other offers followed—they toured with Mike Shinoda of Linkin Park, opened for the Wu-Tang Clan, composed the music for the Fox series Pitch. Individually and together, Wil and Kev have worked with Alessia Cara, 2 Chainz, and Lil Wayne. All the while, Black Violin continued touring, playing as many as 200 shows a year, and released two independent, self-financed albums before releasing the acclaimed Stereotypes in 2015.

The duo currently performs with DJ SPS and drummer Nat Stokes.

== Early years ==
Sylvester and Baptiste attended Dillard High School of Performing Arts, where they had the same music teacher.

=== Wil B ===
Wil B is the stage name of Wilner Baptiste. Baptiste originally wanted to play saxophone but learned the viola as it was the only instrument available in class. According to a 2012 interview, Baptiste stated: "I stuck with the viola and it opened a lot of doors for me." Baptiste went on to attend Florida State University on a full scholarship.

=== Kev Marcus ===
Kev Marcus is the stage name of Kevin Sylvester. Of his early years, Sylvester stated in a 2012 interview: "I didn't want to be the violinist in my neighborhood." According to Sylvester, in the fifth grade: "I got into a little trouble...and my mom said she needed me to get into something, so she took me to Saturday morning violin class." Sylvester went on to attend Florida International University (FIU) on a full scholarship.

== Career ==
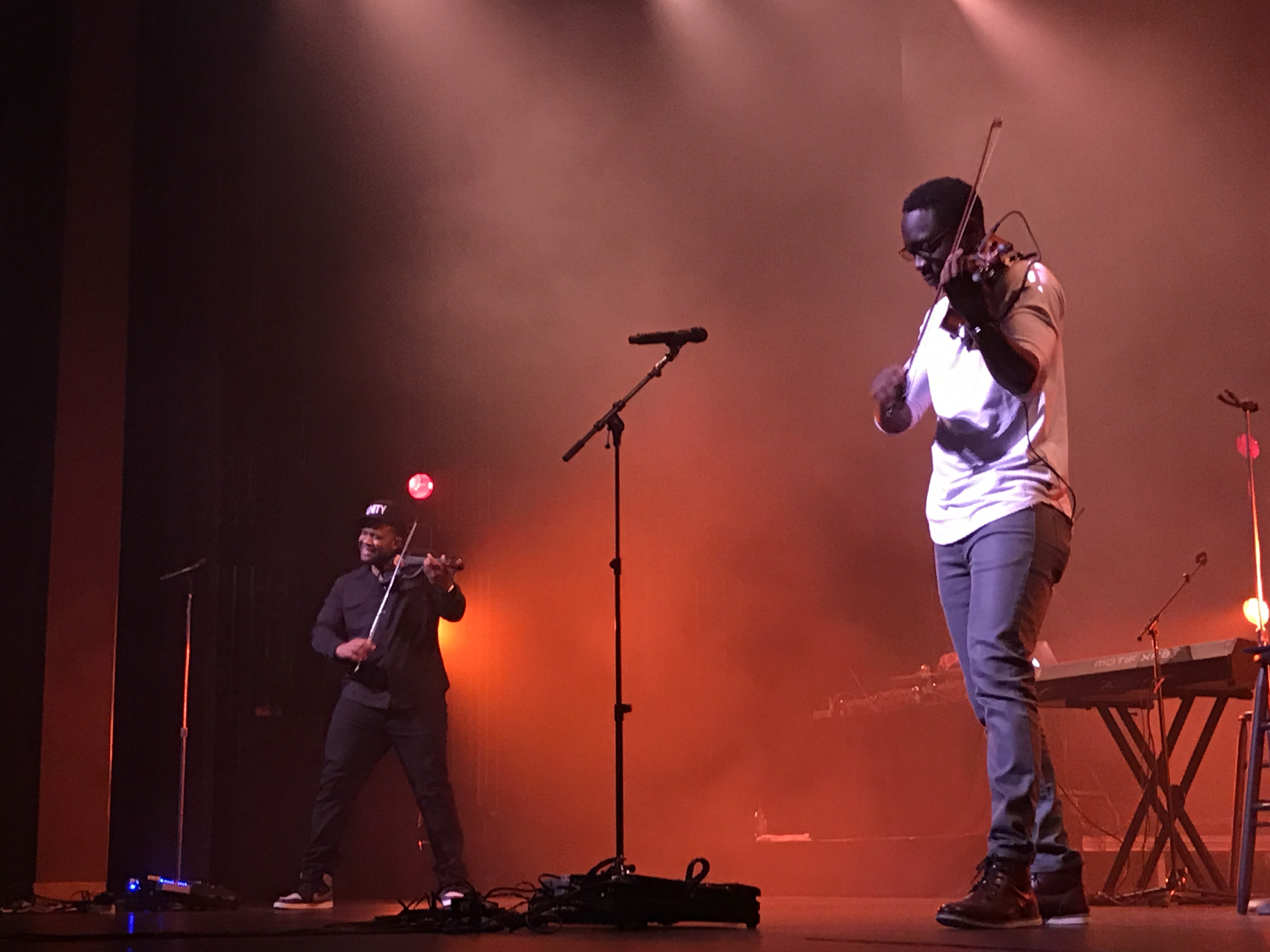
Black Violin performs March 28, 2017 at the Washington Center for the Performing Arts in Olympia, WA

The group name "Black Violin" is derived from the album of the same name by jazz violinist, Stuff Smith. At FIU, Sylvester met Sam G., who would go on to become the duo's manager. Alongside Sam G., the duo went on to co-found the production company DKNEX, which stands for Di-Versatile Music.

According to Baptiste, "We wanted to be the next Neptunes; the next Timbaland...but we noticed how, whenever we performed with our artists, the audience was really drawn to us." Of the duo's artistic philosophy on its self-titled album, Sylvester said:

"Our mantra has always been to engage the audience to look at things from a different perspective...At first, we leaned on the fact that we were different —more than on our technique. We wanted you to be confused. This time, we tried to keep our core message, but with more gravitas: more seriousness. Not just be crazy and different, but really step it up and be badass violinists."

Black Violin clinched the Showtime at the Apollo 2005 Legend title, of which Sylvester said:

"After we won the Apollo, which is the hardest audience on the planet, we knew there was something there...The hard thing was to package it so that people would give us a chance, because we were doing something that nobody had ever seen. Every time we step on stage, we had to prove it over and over."

Black Violin's popularity has risen with their performance accompanying Alicia Keys at the 2004 Billboard Awards, and by performing on the same bill with some of the industry's biggest artists, such as Wu-Tang Clan, and Mike Shinoda of Linkin Park. The two men are also producers and writers, having worked with Kanye West, Tom Petty, Lupe Fiasco, Aerosmith, among others.

Black Violin was invited to play at the Kids Inaugural Concert, one of the inaugural balls for United States President Barack Obama, in 2013. The concert was a special tribute to military families and was attended by First Lady Michelle Obama, her daughters Malia Obama and Sasha Obama, and Second Lady (at the time) Jill Biden.

== Philanthropy ==
The Black Violin Foundation reaches over 100,000 students per year through free performances and work through youth symphonies, community centers, and low-income, Title I schools. The duo's wives are the co-directors of the foundation.

Alongside the TurnAround Arts at the Kennedy Center for Performing Arts, Black Violin also maintains a mentorship program at Mary M. Bethune Elementary School in Broward County, Florida.

== Discography ==
- Black Violin (2008), Di Versatile Music Group
- Classically Trained (2012), Di Versatile Music Group
- Stereotypes (2015), Deutsche Grammophon/Universal Music Classics
- Take the Stairs (2019), Di Versatile Music Group
- Give Thanks (2020), Di Versatile Music Group
- Full Circle (2025), Di Versatile Music Group

=== Mixtapes ===
- BV Mixtape Series: Unleashed (2006)
- BV Mixtape Series: Unleashed II (2009)
