= The Blind Boys of Alabama =

American gospel group (founded 1939)

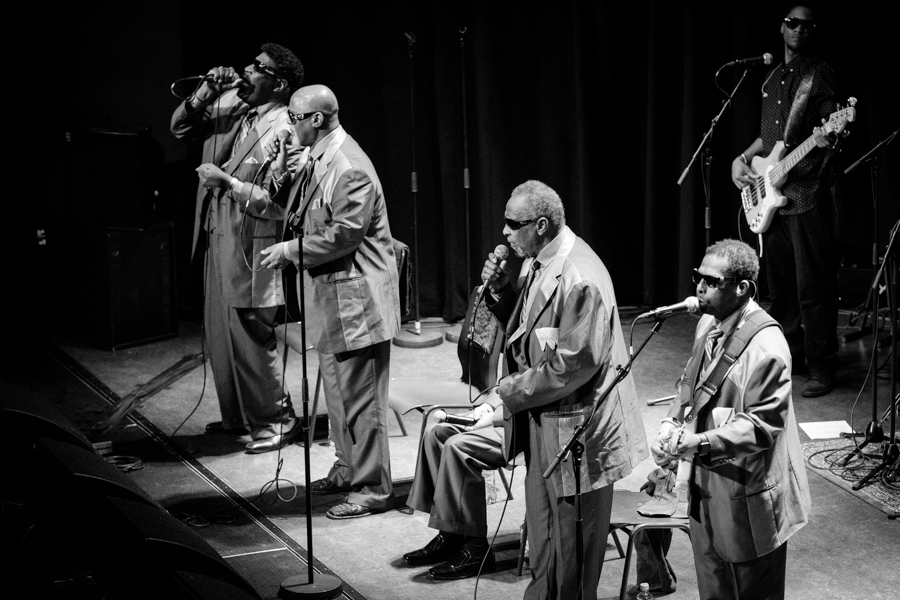
- The Blind Boys of Alabama performing at Cosmopolite Scene Oslo in 2018

Background information
- Origin: Talladega, Alabama, U.S.
- Genres: Gospel, traditional black gospel, blues, soul
- Years active: 1939–present
- Members: Ricky McKinnie; Joey Williams; Reverend Julius Love; JW Smith; Sterling Glass
- Past members: Ben Moore; Clarence Fountain; Johnny Fields; George Scott; Olice Thomas; Vel Bozman Traylor; Reverend J.T. Hutton; Bishop Billy Bowers; Caleb Butler; Samuel Butler Jr; Roscoe Robinson; Charles Porter; Dwight Fields; Paul Beasley; Jimmy Carter
- Website: blindboys.com

The Blind Boys of Alabama, also billed as The Five Blind Boys of Alabama, and Clarence Fountain and the Blind Boys of Alabama, is an American gospel group. The group was founded in 1939 in Talladega, Alabama, and has featured a changing roster of musicians over its history, the majority of whom are or were vision impaired.

The Blind Boys found mainstream success following their appearance in the 1983 Obie Award-winning musical The Gospel at Colonus. Since then, the group has toured internationally and has performed and recorded with such artists as Prince, Lou Reed, Peter Gabriel, Bonnie Raitt, Ben Harper, Bon Iver, and Amadou & Mariam. The group's cover of the Tom Waits song "Way Down in the Hole" was used as the theme song for the first season of the HBO series The Wire.

The Blind Boys have won five Grammy Awards in addition to being presented with a Grammy Lifetime Achievement Award in 2009. They were endowed with a National Heritage Fellowship from the National Endowment for the Arts in 1994, they were inducted into the Gospel Music Hall of Fame in 2003, and they were inducted into the Alabama Music Hall of Fame in 2010. The group was also invited to the White House during the Bill Clinton, George W. Bush, and Barack Obama administrations.

Group member Ricky McKinnie said in a 2011 interview with the magazine Mother Jones: "Our disability doesn't have to be a handicap. It's not about what you can't do. It's about what you do. And what we do is sing good gospel music."

== History ==
=== 1930s and 1940s ===
The Blind Boys of Alabama first sang together in 1939 as part of the school chorus at the Alabama Institute for the Negro Deaf and Blind in Talladega, Alabama. The founding members were Clarence Fountain (1929–2018), George Scott (1929–2005), Velma Bozman Traylor (1923–1947), Johnny Fields (1927–2009), Olice Thomas (b. 1926, d. unknown), and the only sighted member, J. T. Hutton (c. 1924–2012.) (Note: While band member Jimmy Carter was often credited as being an "original" or "founding" member of the group, he was actually too young to join the group when they began touring, but he was attending the Alabama Institute for the Negro Blind when the group was originally formed. He did not officially join the group until the 1980s, having previously worked with the Dixieland Blind Boys as well as Five Blind Boys of Mississippi. Carter's first recorded performance with the Blind Boys was on their 1982 record I'm a Soldier in the Army of the Lord.)

Early influences of the Blind Boys include the Golden Gate Quartet, The Soul Stirrers and The Heavenly Gospel Singers. While the boys were not allowed to sing black gospel music at their school (which was run by an all-white faculty), they were able to hear it on the radio.

The earliest version of the group was known as The Happy Land Jubilee Singers and their first performances were for World War II soldiers at nearby encampments, where the boys sang for pocket change. The group's first professional performance was on June 10, 1944, during a broadcast from radio station WSGN (currently WAGG) in Birmingham, Alabama. The following year, the members dropped out of school and began touring the gospel circuit. In 1947, lead vocalist Traylor died in a gun accident.

In 1948, a Newark, New Jersey, promoter booked the Happy Land Jubilee Singers along with a gospel act from Mississippi known as the Jackson Harmoneers, whose members were also visually impaired, and advertised the program as the "Battle of the Blind Boys." The two acts soon changed their names to the Five Blind Boys of Alabama and the Five Blind Boys of Mississippi and often toured together. The Blind Boys' early sound was also influenced by the Five Blind Boys of Mississippi who were singing in the "hard gospel" style that was becoming popular at the time. Hard gospel often involved a shrieking and screaming style of singing and during performances some audience members reportedly would get so excited that some would have to be sent to the hospital.

The Blind Boys made their first recordings in 1948 on the Coleman label and their first national hit was "I Can See Everybody's Mother But Mine" released in 1949. Their success led to a series of recordings on various record labels.

Reverend Paul Exkano of the King Solomon Baptist Church in New Orleans joined the group shortly after they changed their name to Five Blind Boys of Alabama and was present during the group's first recordings in 1948 and 1949, but he left the group after two years and was replaced by Percell Perkins of the Five Blind Boys of Mississippi, later replaced by Joe Watson.

=== 1950s ===
During the 1950s, black gospel music was popular and the Blind Boys were one of the better known groups. Artists from pop and rock genres began to include aspects of black gospel music in their arrangements and black gospel artists such as Ray Charles and Sam Cooke began crossing over to pop and rock music. Ray Charles's manager offered the Blind Boys a big touring deal if they would cross over to other genres, but the group decided to stick to their gospel roots. They signed with Specialty Records in 1953, but left five years later, after again being pressured to sing secular music.

While the Blind Boys were selling records in the 1950s, they did not make much money. In an interview with Ebony magazine in 2003, Fountain stated that they signed contracts that took advantage of them and that they were each paid $50 per album side and the record company kept the rest. By 1953, each member made $100 per side and, as per Fountain, "That was good money in that day. We didn't know what we were worth."

=== 1960s and 1970s ===
Into the 1960s the popularity of traditional gospel music was on the decline and soul music gained favor as a new type of secular black music. At the same time, rhythm and blues and rock musicians began to incorporate traditional gospel sounds into their music. The term soul was originally used by gospel musicians in the 1950s to identify the spiritual nature of their music. By the late 1960s, the term being used more commonly to describe all popular music by African Americans.

During the 1960s, the Blind Boys performed at benefits for Martin Luther King Jr. and the civil rights movement. They continued to resist offers to sing more secular music. Fountain attributed their resistance to selling out to their lack of need, noting that they were happy and well-fed as they were and wanted to enjoy performing the music they sought to perform, as opposed to recording popular music solely for a paycheck.

In 1969, Fountain left the group in order to pursue a solo career. Neither the Blind Boys nor Fountain found much success into the 1970s. In 1972, guitarist Samuel Butler Jr. (son of the guitarist of the Five Blind Boys of Mississippi) joined the group. Fountain returned to the group in 1977.

=== 1980s and 1990s ===
During their first 40 years, the Blind Boys had primarily played for black gospel audiences, mainly in churches and school auditoriums. The 1980s would mark the group's exposure to a wider audience.

By the early 1980s, singer Clarence Fountain had taken the role as the group's frontman. It was at this time that the group was joined by vocalist Jimmy Carter, whose first recording with the group was on their 1982 record I'm a Soldier in the Army of the Lord. Carter sang with the Dixieland Blind Boys, as well as the Five Blind Boys of Mississippi, prior to his work with The Blind Boys of Alabama. Carter was a student of the Alabama Institute for the Negro Blind when the group was originally formed, but was too young to join the group when they began touring.

In 1983, the group (billed as Clarence Fountain and The Five Blind Boys of Alabama) was cast in the theatrical production The Gospel at Colonus, an African-American musical version of Sophocles' tragedy, Oedipus at Colonus. In the play, the Blind Boys collectively played the part of blinded Oedipus. The cast included Morgan Freeman as well as members of The Soul Stirrers. The Gospel at Colonus won an Obie for Best Musical in 1984 and the production moved to Broadway in 1988. The play's success led to the Blind Boys' exposure to a wider mainstream audience and marked a turning point for the group.

In 1990, vocalist and percussionist Ricky McKinnie was invited by Fountain to join the Blind Boys. McKinnie had actually met the Blind Boys when he was about five years old. McKinnie's mother, Sarah McKinnie Shivers, was a singer who would often cross paths with the Blind Boys while she was on tour. McKinnie lost his sight due to glaucoma at age 23, but had been playing drums for over a decade prior.

The Blind Boys released Deep River in 1992, which was nominated for Best Traditional Soul Gospel Album at the 36th Annual Grammy Awards. The album was produced by Booker T. Jones, and featured a version of Bob Dylan's "I Believe In You." In 1993, they appeared as musical guests on Late Night with Conan O'Brien.

In 1994, the National Endowment for the Arts awarded a National Heritage Fellowship to Clarence Fountain and the Five Blind Boys of Alabama. The award was presented to the Blind Boys by First Lady Hillary Clinton.

In 1995, the Blind Boys became the first artists to be signed to the new House of Blues gospel label, for which they recorded their first live album I Brought Him with Me. The album featured appearances from blues singers Koko Taylor and Solomon Burke. In December 1996, the group appeared in the Christmas episode of TV series Beverly Hills, 90210 titled "Gift Wrapped". The Blind Boys continued experimenting with contemporary popular music on their 1997 release Holding On, also released on the House of Blues label. The album contained elements of funk and reggae.

=== 2000s ===
"Free at last" (2:40)
The Blind Boys of Alabama perform "Free at Last" at the White House on February 9, 2010

The Blind Boys of Alabama enjoyed further exposure and success in the 2000s and 2010s, including collaborations with many high-profile musical artists. Their songs were featured on soundtracks of television series, such as Boston Public, Lost, and Criminal Minds, as well as films, such as Madea Goes to Jail, Alpha and Omega, and Hop. The Blind Boys made an appearance in the film The Fighting Temptations and were featured on such television series as 60 Minutes II and The Colbert Report, as well as on multiple episodes of The Tonight Show with Jay Leno and Late Night with David Letterman. They were invited to perform at the White House in both 2002 during the presidency of George W. Bush for a celebration of gospel music, and in 2010 during the presidency of Barack Obama for a celebration of music from the civil rights movement.

In 2001, the Blind Boys released Spirit of the Century on Peter Gabriel's Real World Records. The album won the award for Best Traditional Soul Gospel Album at the 44th Annual Grammy Awards. The album included a version of "I Just Want to See His Face" by The Rolling Stones as well as a version of the song "Amazing Grace" arranged to the tune of "The House of the Rising Sun".

In 2002, they released Higher Ground, an album that combines traditional gospel lyrics with the music of other artists. The title song is a rendition of the Stevie Wonder hit, but some of the lyrics were changed to make it a gospel song—for example, the line "Lovers, keep on lovin'" became "Prayers, keep on prayin." Other songs covered on the album include "People Get Ready" by Curtis Mayfield, "Spirit in the Dark" by Aretha Franklin, "The Cross" by Prince, and "You and Your Folks, Me and My Folks" by Funkadelic. The album won the Blind Boys another Grammy for Best Traditional Soul Gospel Album and also won them a GMA Dove Award for Traditional Gospel Album of the Year. The Blind Boys also performed on the steps of the Library of Congress in 2002.

In 2003, the Blind Boys released Go Tell It on the Mountain. The album contains renditions of mostly Christmas-related gospel songs and features guest artists Solomon Burke, Tom Waits, Michael Franti, Chrissie Hynde, Richard Thompson, Aaron Neville, Mavis Staples, Shelby Lynne, George Clinton, Robert Randolph, Meshell Ndegeocello, and Les McCann. The album went on to win the Grammy for Best Traditional Soul Gospel Album. They also contributed to the soundtrack of the Disney animated film Brother Bear, performing the song "Welcome" alongside Phil Collins.

The Blind Boys performed live twice with Lou Reed: In 2004, they performed together at a private concert on the floor of the UN General Assembly for the Landmine Survivors Network and in 2010, they appeared on Late Night with David Letterman and performed "Jesus", a song originally released by The Velvet Underground on their eponymous album.

The Blind Boys collaborated several times with Ben Harper: Harper played guitar on the Blind Boys' albums Higher Ground and Spirit of the Century. The Blind Boys again collaborated with Harper on his 2004 album There Will Be a Light and toured with him throughout Europe that year. The majority of the songs were Harper originals, but the album also included a cover of Bob Dylan and Danny O'Keefe's "Well, Well, Well." There Will Be a Light also won the Grammy for Best Traditional Soul Gospel Album. The following year, Harper and the Blind Boys released Live at the Apollo, a recording of their live performance from the Apollo Theater in October 2004.

The Blind Boys released the album Atom Bomb in 2005. The album features cover versions of songs such as "Demons" by Fatboy Slim and Macy Gray, (a track that also featured a guest appearance by rapper Gift of Gab); Blind Faith's "Presence of the Lord," featuring soul musician Billy Preston; and a cover of Norman Greenbaum's "Spirit in the Sky," featuring David Hidalgo of Los Lobos and blues musician Charlie Musselwhite. The album was awarded the prize for Traditional Gospel Album of the Year at the 37th GMA Dove Awards.

On March 9, 2005, at the age of 75, vocalist George Scott died of complications from diabetes and a heart condition. In 2006, vocalist Ben Moore was invited to join the group by Carter. Moore had previously performed under the name "Bobby Purify" as part of the R&B duo James & Bobby Purify and continued to use the name as a solo artist after the duo broke up in the 1980s. In 2007, Fountain stopped touring with the group due to complications from diabetes.

In 2008, the Blind Boys released the album Down in New Orleans. The album was recorded in New Orleans, which was a first for the group, and includes songs written by or made famous by New Orleans musicians along with updated gospel standards. Many tracks also feature guest musicians from the city. Tracks include a jazzy version of the popular gospel song "Uncloudy Day", backed by the Preservation Hall Jazz Band; blues song "Make a Better World" written by musician Earl King), backed by the Hot 8 Brass Band; as well as a bluesy version of "If I Could Help Somebody" by Mahalia Jackson with Allen Toussaint on piano. The album also won the GMA Dove Award for Traditional Gospel Album of the Year.

The Blind Boys released their album Duets in 2009. Each song features a duet between the Blind Boys and another artist; some of these artists include Susan Tedeschi, Bonnie Raitt, and John Hammond. Earlier that same year, the group was honored with a Lifetime Achievement Award at the 52nd Annual Grammy Awards.

=== 2010s ===
In 2010, the Blind Boys were inducted into the Alabama Music Hall of Fame.

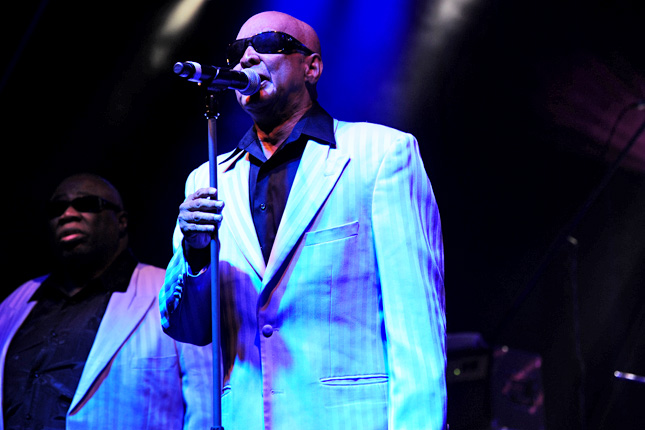
The Blind Boys of Alabama performing at the West Coast Blues & Roots Festival in 2011.

In 2011, the group appeared in the live-action/animated feature film Hop.

Vocalist Billy Bowers left the group in 2011 when he was injured and underwent back surgery. Bowers' role as vocalist was filled by Ricky McKinnie, who was also the groups' percussionist for many years. Bowers died July 2, 2013, of heart failure in Montgomery, Alabama, at the age of 71.

In 2013, the Blind Boys released I'll Find a Way, produced by Justin Vernon of Bon Iver. The album also features guest appearances by Sam Amidon and Merrill Garbus of Tune-Yards. The following year, the Blind Boys released Talkin' Christmas! in collaboration with blues musician Taj Mahal.

In 2016, the Blind Boys contributed to God Don't Never Change: The Songs of Blind Willie Johnson, a tribute album recorded in honor of gospel musician Blind Willie Johnson. The Blind Boys performed the song "Mother's Children Have a Hard Time", a performance that was nominated for Best American Roots Performance at the 60th Annual Grammy Awards. The album was also nominated in the category of Best Roots Gospel Album. In 2017, the Blind Boys released the album Almost Home on BBOA Records in collaboration with Amazon Music. Fountain also rejoined the group for the album's recording. The songs on the album were written for the Blind Boys by writers including Marc Cohn, Phil Cook, John Leventhal, and Valerie June. The Blind Boys' manager, Charles Driebe, recorded interviews with the members of the group then shared them with the songwriters who wrote songs reflecting the Blind Boys' personal stories. The song "Let My Mother Live" from the album was nominated for Best American Roots Performance at the 60th Annual Grammy Awards. Written by Leventhal, the song is about Carter as a young boy at the Alabama Institute and "how scared I was, and that I wanted my mother to live until I got grown." On August 28, 2020, Single Lock Records released the Blind Boys' album Almost Home to all platforms, including a bonus track: previously unreleased Bob Dylan song, "See By Faith."

On June 3, 2018, Clarence Fountain died of complications from diabetes at the age of 88 in Baton Rouge, Louisiana. His final performance with the Blind Boys of Alabama was on May 16, 2018, at the Manship Theatre there.

September 2018 saw the release of the Muscle Shoals tribute album, Small Town, Big Sound. The Blind Boys, along with blues musician Mike Farris, performed a cover of the song "Respect Yourself." The album also featured cover songs by such artists as Steven Tyler, Willie Nelson, Grace Potter, Chris Stapleton, and Kid Rock.

In January 2019, the Blind Boys performed with Marc Cohn at the Katharine Hepburn Cultural Arts Center. The performance was broadcast on the PBS live music series The Kate that spring.

Over the summer of 2019, the Blind Boys toured Europe with blind Afro-pop duo Amadou & Mariam. Similar to the Blind Boys, the husband-and-wife duo originally met in 1975 at the Bamako Institute for the Blind in Mali. During the tour, the two groups of vocalists would provide vocal accompaniment to performances of each group's songs. They would also perform original material that they had created together, such as the songs "Bamako to Birmingham" and "Two Cultures, One Beat."

In August of that same year, the Blind Boys released a collaborative album with Marc Cohn titled Work To Do. The album features Cohn and the Blind Boys performing new and older material by Cohn in addition to renditions of traditional gospel songs. Seven of the tracks are recordings from their performance on The Kate earlier that same year, including Cohn's hit "Walking in Memphis", as well the Blind Boys' version of "Amazing Grace" to the melody of "The House of the Rising Sun". On October 15, 2019, the group appeared on Today to perform the title track alongside Marc Cohn.

Music blog UDiscoverMusic named Blind Boys the longest standing music group, as they are still touring and writing/recording music after being founded in 1939. In 2019, Jason Isbell selected the Blind Boys to join him for his October residency at the Ryman Auditorium. Shortly after, they were featured with Irish TV host Hector Ó hEochagáin for his show Hector USA. The Blind Boys' 2019 Christmas Tour earned the praise of The New Yorker, which commented "The beloved gospel ensemble the Blind Boys of Alabama...remains perennially fresh, whether it's interjecting godliness into unexpected songs or, as in this case, saluting Christmas."

=== 2020s ===
In March 2020, the group toured Australia and New Zealand, performing at the Womadelaide and Womad NZ festivals. In May 2020, Woodstock legend Wavy Gravy included the Blind Boys in his virtual music festival celebrating his 84th birthday.

To kick off 2021, the Recording Academy featured the Blind Boys performing 'If I Had a Hammer' on their "Positive Vibes Only" series. Later that year, the Blind Boys teamed up with Béla Fleck to release a new version of "I Wish I Knew How It Would Feel to Be Free" for Record Store Day. The song went on to be nominated for a Grammy Award in the Best American Roots Performance category.

Singer Ben Moore (Benjamin Moore, Jr.) died of natural causes on May 12, 2022. He was 80 years old. In July 2022, the Blind Boys were featured as performers at the closing ceremonies of the World Games at the Protective Stadium in Birmingham, Alabama. They performed with Jamey Johnson and a 75-piece orchestra led by Dr. Henry Panion on a bill headlined by Lionel Richie.

In September 2022, the Blind Boys released two collaborative tracks with Black Violin titled "We Are One" and "The Message", the latter of which was nominated for a Grammy for Best Americana Performance. The View featured the Blind Boys on Martin Luther King Jr Day 2023, including an interview and multiple performances.

Tenor Paul Beasley died on March 13, 2023, at the age of 78. Beasley was previously a member of such groups as Gospel Keynotes and the Mighty Clouds of Joy. He joined the Blind Boys in 2013 after losing his eyesight.

In 2023, the Blind Boys album Echoes of the South earned three Grammy Award nominations, including Best Roots Gospel Album, as well as Best American Roots Performance for the song "Heaven Help Us All" and Best Americana Performance for the song "Friendship". The album was named after the Birmingham radio program that hosted the group's first professional performance in 1944. Jimmy Carter retired from the Blind Boys after recording the album, at the age of 91.

== Awards and nominations ==
Year	Nominee / work	Category	Award	Result
1994	Deep River	Best Traditional Soul Gospel Album	Grammy Awards	Nominated
2002	Spirit of the Century	Best Traditional Soul Gospel Album	Grammy Awards	Won
2003	Higher Ground	Best Traditional Soul Gospel Album	Grammy Awards	Won
2003	Higher Ground	Traditional Gospel Album of the Year	Dove Award	Won
2004	Go Tell It on the Mountain	Best Traditional Soul Gospel Album	Grammy Awards	Won
2005	There Will Be a Light	Best Traditional Soul Gospel Album	Grammy Awards	Won
2006	Atom Bomb	Traditional Gospel Album of the Year	Dove Award	Won
2009	Down in New Orleans	Traditional Gospel Album of the Year	Dove Award	Won
2009	"Free At Last"	Traditional Gospel Recorded Song of the Year	Dove Award	Won
2009	Down in New Orleans	Best Traditional Gospel Album	Grammy Awards	Won
2009	The Blind Boys of Alabama	Lifetime Achievement Award	Grammy Awards	Won
2016	God Don't Never Change: The Songs of Blind Willie Johnson	Best Roots Gospel Album	Grammy Awards	Nominated
2016	"Mother's Children Have a Hard Time", from the album God Don't Never Change: The Songs of Blind Willie Johnson	Best American Roots Performance	Grammy Awards	Nominated
2017	"Let My Mother Live", from their album Almost Home	Best American Roots Performance	Grammy Awards	Nominated
2021	"I Wish I Knew How It Would Feel to Be Free", with Béla Fleck	Best American Roots Performance	Grammy Awards	Nominated
2022	"The Message", with Black Violin	Best Americana Performance	Grammy Awards	Nominated
2023	Echoes of the South	Best Roots Gospel Album	Grammy Awards	Won
2023	"Heaven Help Us All"	Best American Roots Performance	Grammy Awards	Nominated
2023	"Friendship"	Best Americana Performance	Grammy Awards	Nominated

== Other honors ==
Year	Honor	Presenter
1994	National Heritage Fellowship	National Endowment for the Arts
2003	Hall of fame inductees	Gospel Music Hall of Fame
2005	Helen Keller Personal Achievement Award	American Foundation for the Blind
2005	First Niarchos Prize for Survivorship	Queen Noor of Jordan on behalf of the Landmine Survivors Network
2010	Hall of fame inductees	Alabama Music Hall of Fame

== Members ==
=== Current members ===
Name	Years active	Instruments
Ricky McKinnie (c. 1952)	1990–present	Drums, vocals
Joey Williams	1991–present	Guitar, vocals
Sterling Glass	2022–present	Vocals
Rev. Julius Love	2020-present	Vocals
Dr. JW Smith	2023-present	Vocals
Peter Levin	?–present	Organ
Stephen Raynard Ladson	?–present	Bass

=== Founding members ===
Name	Years active	Instruments	Notes
Clarence Fountain (November 28, 1929–June 3, 2018)	1939–1968, 1980–2007, 2017–2018	Lead vocals	
George Scott (1929–2005)	1939–2005	Vocals	
Johnny Fields (1927–2009)	1939–1990s	Vocals	Performed sporadically after 1970s.
Olice Thomas (b. 1926, deceased)	1939–1993	Vocals	Date of death unknown. Performed infrequently after 1970s.
J. T. Hutton (c. 1924–July 27, 2012)	1939–1958	Vocals	The only sighted original member.
Vel Bozman Traylor (1923–1947)	1939–1947	Vocals	
Eddie Cox	1939–1941	Vocals	

=== Former members ===
Name	Years active	Instruments	Notes
Paul Excano	1947–1948	Vocals	
Roscoe Robinson (b. May 22, 1928, d. February 26, 2026)	Late 1950s	Vocals	
Bishop Billy Bowers (c. 1942, d. July 2, 2013)	1968–1980, 2005–2011	Lead vocals	
Samuel Butler Jr.	1972–1994	rhythm guitar, vocals	No relation to Caleb "Bobby" Butler.
Charles Porter	1973–?	Vocals	
Caleb "Bobby" Butler	1979–2008	bass, vocals	Butler is sighted. No relation to Samuel Butler Jr.
Jimmy Carter (c. 1932)	1983–2023	Lead & backing vocals	Sang casually with original members until 1944. Later, fronted an identically named group from 1947 until 1952.
JT Clinkscales	1983–1990s	Vocals	
Joe Watson	1972–1987	(unclear)	
Curtis Foster (b. June 8 1959)	mid 1990s–2002	Vocals	
Ben Moore (b. August 7, 1941, d. May 12, 2022)	2006–2022	Vocals	
Paul Beasley (b. December 11, 1944, d. March 13, 2023)	2013–2023	Vocals	

== Discography ==
=== As main artists ===
- 1949 – I Can See Everybody's Mother But Mine – Coleman Records
- 1950 – Sweet Honey in the Rocks – Palda Records
- 1950 – Livin' On Mother's Prayers – Palda Records
- 1950 – Come Over Here The Table Spread – Palda Records
- 1953 – The Sermon
- 1953 – When I Lost My Mother – Specialty Records
- 1954 – Marching Up To Zion – Specialty Records
- 1954 – Oh Lord, Stand By Me – Specialty Records
- 1958 – My Mother's Train – Vee-Jay Records
- 1959 – God is On the Throne – Savoy Records
- 1959 – The Original Blind Boys – Savoy Records
- 1963 – (1957) You'll Never Walk Alone – HOB Records
- 1963 – Old Time Religion – HOB Records
- 1963 – True Convictions – HOB Records
- 1965 – Can I Get a Witness? – HOB Records
- 1967 – Church Concert in New Orleans (Live) – HOB Records
- 1969 – Fix it Jesus Like You Said You Would – Keen Records
- 1969 – Jesus Will Be Waiting
- 1970 – In the Gospel Light
- 1970 – The Five Blind Boys From Alabama
- 1970 – The Soul of Clarence Fountain
- 1973 – Best of Five Blind Boys of Alabama
- 1974 – Precious Memories
- 1974 – There's a God Somewhere – ABC Records
- 1978 – The Soldier Album – PIR Records
- 1981 – Faith Moves Mountains – Messiah Records
- 1982 – I'm a Soldier in the Army of the Lord
- 1987 – In the Hands of the Lord
- 1989 – I'm a Changed Man – Wajji Records
- 1989 – The Five Blind Boys of Alabama
- 1990 – Brand New – Wajji Records
- 1990 – I'm Not That Way Anymore – Atlanta International Records
- 1991 – I am a Soldier
- 1991 – Oh Lord, Stand By Me / Marching Up to Zion
- 1991 – The Best of the Five Blind Boys
- 1992 – Deep River – Elektra/Nonesuch Records
- 1993 – Bridge Over Troubled Waters
- 1994 – Alive in Person
- 1994 – Blessed Assurance
- 1994 – Don't Forget To Pray
- 1994 – In the Gospel Light
- 1994 – Soul Gospel
- 1994 – Swing Low, Sweet Chariot
- 1995 – 1948–51
- 1995 – I Brought Him With Me – House of Blues Music Company
- 1996 – All Things Are Possible
- 1996 – Golden Moments in Gospel
- 1997 – Holdin' On – House of Blues Music Company
- 1998 – Have Faith: The Very Best of the Five Blind Boys of Alabama
- 1999 – Best of Clarence Fountain and the Five Blind Boys of Alabama
- 1999 – Hallelujah: A Collection of Their Finest
- 2000 – My Lord What a Morning
- 2001 – Spirit of the Century – Real World Records
- 2001 – You'll Never Walk Alone / True Convictions (reissue)
- 2002 – Higher Ground – Real World Records
- 2003 – Amazing Grace
- 2003 – Go Tell It on the Mountain – Real World Records
- 2004 – There Will Be a Light (with Ben Harper) – Virgin Records
- 2005 – Live at the Apollo (with Ben Harper)
- 2005 – Atom Bomb – Real World Records
- 2006 – Just a Closer Walk with Thee, a compilation of work ranging from the years 1963–1965
- 2008 – Down in New Orleans – Time Life – Grammy winner
- 2009 – Enlightenment – The Great American Music Co. (2 CDs)
- 2009 – Duets (compilation of collaborations with other artists) – Saguaro Road Records
- 2010 – Faith Moves Mountains (reissue)
- 2011 – Take the High Road – Saguaro Road Records
- 2013 – I'll Find a Way – Sony Masterworks
- 2014 – Talkin' Christmas! (with Taj Mahal) – Sony Masterworks
- 2017 – Almost Home – BBOA Records/Single Lock Records
- 2019 – Work To Do (with Marc Cohn) – BMG Records
- 2021 – I Wish I Knew How It Would Feel to Be Free (with Bela Fleck) – Single Lock Records
- 2023 – Echoes Of The South – Single Lock Records
- 2024 - I Heard The Bells On Christmas Day feat. Jay Buchanan - Thirty Tigers

=== As featured or guest artists ===
- 2002 – Up by Peter Gabriel on his song "Sky Blue"
- 2002 – Lifted: Songs of the Spirit – "Freedom Road"
- 2002 – WYEP Live and Direct: Volume 4 – On Air Performances – "Amazing Grace"
- 2002 – Don't Give Up on Me by Solomon Burke on his song "None of Us Are Free"
- 2003 – Brother Bear: An Original Walt Disney Records Soundtrack – "Welcome" with Phil Collins and Oren Waters
- 2005 – Redemption Songs – "Nothing But The Blood"
- 2007 – Song of America – "Let Us Break Bread Together"
- 2014 – Songs from a Stolen Spring – "Freedom"
- 2016 – God Don't Never Change: The Songs of Blind Willie Johnson – "Mother's Children Have a Hard Time"
- 2018 – King of the Road: A Tribute to Roger Miller - "The Crossing" with Ronnie Dunn
