= Something for Kate discography =

Band discography

- Studio albums: 7
- EPs: 3
- Live albums: 1
- Compilation albums: 4
- Singles: 28

The discography of Australian rock band Something for Kate, consists of seven studio albums, one live album, four compilation albums, three extended plays and 28 singles.

== Albums ==
=== Studio albums ===
List of studio albums, with release date, label, and selected chart positions and certifications shown
Title	Album details	Peak chart positions	Certifications
Title	Album details	AUS	Certifications
Elsewhere for 8 Minutes	Released: 4 July 1997; Label: Murmur, Sony BMG (MATTCD053); Formats: CD, LP	70	ARIA: Gold
Beautiful Sharks	Released: 7 June 1999; Label: Murmur, Sony BMG (MATTCD085); Formats: CD, LP	10	ARIA: Platinum
Echolalia	Released: 22 June 2001; Label: Murmur, Sony BMG (MATTCD111); Formats: CD, LP	2	ARIA: Platinum
The Official Fiction	Released: 15 August 2003; Label: Murmur, Sony BMG (MATTCD130); Formats: CD, LP	1	ARIA: Platinum
Desert Lights	Released: 1 June 2006; Label: Murmur, Sony BMG (MATTCD136); Formats: CD, LP	1	ARIA: Gold
Leave Your Soul to Science	Released: 28 September 2012; Label: EMI, Capitol (4042422); Formats: CD, LP	5	
The Modern Medieval	Released: 20 November 2020; Label: EMI, Capitol (0710366); Formats: CD, LP, digital download, streaming	4	
"—" denotes a release that did not chart or was not issued in that region.

=== Live albums ===
List of live albums
Title	Album details
Live at the Corner	Released: 24 February 2008; Label: New Found Frequency; Formats: CD

=== Compilation albums ===
List of compilation albums, with selected chart positions
Title	Album details	Peak chart positions	Certifications
Title	Album details	AUS	Certifications
Q & A with Dean Martin	Released: 2000; Label: Murmur/Sony BMG (MATTCD098); Formats: CD	—	
Phantom Limbs: Selected B-Sides	Released: 20 August 2004; Label: Murmur/Sony BMG; Formats: 2× CD	27	
iTunes Originals – Something for Kate	Released: 22 May 2007; Label: Sony BMG; Formats: Download only	—	
The Murmur Years: The Best of Something for Kate 1996 – 2007	Released: 18 August 2007; Label: Sony BMG; Formats: CD	26	ARIA: Gold
"—" denotes a release that did not chart or was not issued in that region.

=== Video albums ===
List of video albums, with release date, label, and selected chart positions and certifications shown
Title	Album details	Peak chart positions	Certifications
Title	Album details	AUS	Certifications
Big Screen Television	Released: 1999; Label: Murmur (200972.2); Formats: VHS	—	
A Diversion	Released: October 2002; Label: Murmur (MATTDVD122); Formats: VHS, DVD	3	ARIA: Gold

== Extended plays ==
List of extended plays
Title	EP details	Peak chart positions
Title	EP details	AUS
....The Answer to Both Your Questions	Released: May 1996; Label: Murmur/Sony BMG (MATTCD028, MATTV028); Formats: CD, 7" vinyl	—
Intermission	Released: March 1997; Label: Murmur/Sony BMG (MATTCD047); Formats: CD	64
Harpoon / Clint (with Jebediah)	Released: July 1998 (Note: Harpoon / Clint is a split EP with tracks by Something for Kate and Jebediah. Two different versions were released, Jebediah's CD version (Harpoon EP) and SFK's 2×7" vinyl. Each had different cover art.); Label: Murmur (MATTCD074, MATTV074); Formats: CD, 2×7" vinyl	—

== Singles ==
List of singles, with selected chart positions
Title	Year	Peak chart positions	Album
Title	Year	AUS	Album
"Dean Martin"	1996	98	Non-album single
"Captain (Million Miles an Hour)"	1997	95	Elsewhere for 8 Minutes
"Prick"	1997	—	Elsewhere for 8 Minutes
"Working Against Me"	1998	—	Elsewhere for 8 Minutes
"Roll Credit"	1998	—	Elsewhere for 8 Minutes
"Electricity"	1999	39	Beautiful Sharks
"Hallways"	1999	54	Beautiful Sharks
"Whatever You Want"	1999	59	Beautiful Sharks
"The Astronaut"	2000	74	Beautiful Sharks
"Monsters"	2001	15	Echolalia
"Three Dimensions"	2001	32	Echolalia
"Twenty Years"	2001	43	Echolalia
"Say Something"	2002	40	Echolalia
"Déjà Vu"	2003	19	The Official Fiction
"Song for a Sleepwalker"	2003	35	The Official Fiction
"Moving Right Along"	2004	60	The Official Fiction
"Cigarettes and Suitcases"	2006	23	Desert Lights
"Oh Kamikaze"	2006	39	Desert Lights
"California"	2007	—	Desert Lights
"The Futurist"	2007	—	The Murmur Years
"Survival Expert"	2012	—	Leave Your Soul to Science
"Miracle Cure"	2012	—	Leave Your Soul to Science
"Star-Crossed Citizens"	2013	—	Leave Your Soul to Science
"Situation Room"	2020	—	The Modern Medieval
"Waste Our Breath"	2020	—	The Modern Medieval
"Supercomputer"	2020	—	The Modern Medieval
"Come Back Before I Come Back to My Senses"	2020	—	The Modern Medieval
"Blue Bird"	2021	—	The Modern Medieval

== Other appearances ==
List of other non-single song appearances
Title	Year	Album
"Photograph"	1999	Songs from Dawson's Creek
"Ordinary World"	1999	Undone: The Songs of Duran Duran
"Dreamworld"	2001	The Power & The Passion - A Tribute to Midnight Oil
"When the War Is Over"	2007	Standing on the Outside
"When The River Runs Dry"	2013	Crucible: The Songs of Hunters & Collectors
