= Triple J's Hottest 100 of 2003 =

Top 100 Australian songs of 2003

2003 Triple J Hottest 100
- Album artwork for the CD compilation

Countdown details
- Date of countdown: 25 January 2004

Countdown highlights
- Winning song: Jet "Are You Gonna Be My Girl"
- Most entries: The White Stripes; Powderfinger (5 tracks)

Chronology
← Previous; 2002	Next → 2004

The 2003 Triple J Hottest 100, announced on 25 January 2004, was the eleventh such countdown of the most popular songs of the year, according to listeners of the Australian radio station Triple J. As in previous years, a CD featuring 40 (not necessarily the top 40) songs was released. A DVD, containing film clips of songs from the Hottest 100 was also released. A countdown of the videos of each song was shown on the ABC music series Rage in March.

== Full list ==
Note: Australian artists

#	Song	Artist	Country of origin
1	Are You Gonna Be My Girl	Jet	Australia
2	Hey Ya!	Outkast	United States
3	Seven Nation Army	The White Stripes	United States
4	(Baby I've Got You) On My Mind	Powderfinger	Australia
5	Clocks (Röyksopp Trembling Heart Mix)	Coldplay	United Kingdom/Norway
6	Hello	The Cat Empire	Australia
7	Sunsets	Powderfinger	Australia
8	Zebra	John Butler Trio	Australia
9	The Nosebleed Section	Hilltop Hoods	Australia
10	Love Your Way	Powderfinger	Australia
11	Déjà Vu	Something for Kate	Australia
12	Lighthouse	The Waifs	Australia
13	We Used to Be Friends	The Dandy Warhols	United States
14	The Hardest Button to Button	The White Stripes	United States
15	I Love Work	Butterfingers	Australia
16	Relapse	Little Birdy	Australia
17	Taylor	Jack Johnson	United States
18	Diamonds On the Inside	Ben Harper	United States
19	Rollover DJ	Jet	Australia
20	Feeler	Pete Murray	Australia
21	Armies Against Me	Epicure	Australia
22	Fortune Faded	Red Hot Chili Peppers	United States
23	Who's Gonna Save Us?	The Living End	Australia
24	The Horizon Has Been Defeated	Jack Johnson	United States
25	Baby Blue	Little Birdy	Australia
26	Russell Crowe's Band	Frenzal Rhomb	Australia
27	There's Always Someone Cooler Than You	Ben Folds	United States
28	Danger! High Voltage	Electric Six	United States
29	With My Own Two Hands	Ben Harper	United States
30	The Bitter End	Placebo	United Kingdom
31	Time Is Running Out	Muse	United Kingdom
32	You Were the Last High	The Dandy Warhols	United States
33	Gay Bar	Electric Six	United States
34	Everyone Deserves Music	Michael Franti & Spearhead	United States
35	Plastic Loveless Letter	Magic Dirt	Australia
36	Just Because	Jane's Addiction	United States
37	Days Like These	The Cat Empire	Australia
38	Everytime	Butterfingers	Australia
39	Coming Home	Alex Lloyd	Australia
40	Times Like These	Jack Johnson	United States
41	Blackbird	The Beautiful Girls	Australia
42	Stockholm Syndrome	Muse	United Kingdom
43	12:51	The Strokes	United States
44	Dumb Enough	Hilltop Hoods	Australia
45	Weak and Powerless	A Perfect Circle	United States
46	77%	The Herd	Australia
47	Bomb the World	Michael Franti & Spearhead	United States
48	There There	Radiohead	United Kingdom
49	2 + 2 = 5	Radiohead	United Kingdom
50	Fisherman's Daughter	The Waifs	Australia
51	Sista (Live)	John Butler Trio	Australia
52	Just Pretend	The Bens	United States
53	Feeling This	Blink-182	United States
54	Let Me Be	Xavier Rudd	Australia
55	Greed for Your Love	Missy Higgins	Australia
56	Franco Un-American	NOFX	United States
57	Work It	Missy Elliott	United States
58	The Leaving Song Pt. II	AFI	United States
59	So Entertaining	Gus and Frank	Australia
60	Watch Out Boys	Magic Dirt	Australia
61	St. Anger	Metallica	United States
62	Music	The Beautiful Girls	Australia
63	Song for a Sleepwalker	Something for Kate	Australia
64	Step into My Office, Baby	Belle and Sebastian	United Kingdom
65	Something White and Sigmund	Andromeda	Australia
66	Tabloid Magazine	The Living End	Australia
67	Lovesong	Amiel	Australia
68	One Second of Insanity	The Butterfly Effect	Australia
69	Hysteria	Muse	United Kingdom
70	The Outsider	A Perfect Circle	United States
71	Girl's Not Grey	AFI	United States
72	Running Up That Hill	Placebo	United Kingdom
73	Life Sentence	Epicure	Australia
74	Look Good in Leather	Cody Chesnutt	United States
75	The Seed (2.0)	The Roots featuring Cody Chesnutt	United States
76	Rockin' Rocks	Powderfinger	Australia
77	Stumblin'	Powderfinger	Australia
78	Who's Ya Daddy?	Gerling	Australia
79	Milkshake	Kelis	United States
80	Satisfaction	Benny Benassi	Italy
81	The Golden Path	The Chemical Brothers featuring The Flaming Lips	United Kingdom/United States
82	Good Luck	Basement Jaxx featuring Lisa Kekaula	United Kingdom/United States
83	Reptilia	The Strokes	United States
84	We Don't Play Guitars	Chicks on Speed featuring Peaches	Germany/Canada
85	Pass That Dutch	Missy Elliott	United States
86	Lines	Pete Murray	Australia
87	Move Your Feet	Junior Senior	Denmark
88	Voices in My Head	Machine Gun Fellatio	Australia
89	Girl, You Have No Faith in Medicine	The White Stripes	United States
90	Break It (Down James Brown)	Offcutts	Australia
91	Vampire Racecourse	The Sleepy Jackson	Australia
92	Doctor Doctor	Gyroscope	Australia
93	I Just Don't Know What to Do with Myself	The White Stripes	United States
94	In the Cold, Cold Night	The White Stripes	United States
95	Special Needs	Placebo	United Kingdom
96	Man of Constant Sorrow	Skeewiff	United Kingdom
97	Growing on Me	The Darkness	United Kingdom
98	Out of Time	Blur	United Kingdom
99	Inertiatic ESP	The Mars Volta	United States
100	The Chariot	The Cat Empire	Australia

== Statistics ==
=== Artists with multiple entries ===
#	Artist	Entries
5	The White Stripes	3, 14, 89, 93, 94
5	Powderfinger	4, 7, 10, 76, 77
3	The Cat Empire	6, 37, 100
3	Jack Johnson	17, 24, 40
3	Placebo	30, 72, 95
3	Muse	31, 42, 69
2	Jet	1, 19
2	John Butler Trio	8, 51
2	Hilltop Hoods	9, 44
2	Something for Kate	11, 62
2	The Waifs	12, 50
2	The Dandy Warhols	13, 32
2	Butterfingers	15, 38
2	Little Birdy	16, 25
2	Ben Harper	18, 29
2	Pete Murray	20, 86
2	Epicure	21, 73
2	Flea (Note: Once with the Red Hot Chili Peppers (22), once with The Mars Volta (99))	22, 99
2	The Living End	23, 66
2	Ben Folds (Note: Once solo (27), once with The Bens (52))	27, 52
2	Electric Six	28, 33
2	Michael Franti and Spearhead	34, 47
2	Magic Dirt	35, 60
2	The Beautiful Girls	41, 62
2	The Strokes	43, 83
2	A Perfect Circle	45, 70
2	Radiohead	48, 49
2	Missy Elliott	57, 85
2	AFI	58, 71
2	Cody ChesnuTT (Note: Once solo (74), once with The Roots (75))	74, 75

=== Countries Represented ===
Country	Entries
Australia	47
United States	38
United Kingdom	14
Norway	1
Italy	1
Germany	1
Canada	1
Denmark	1

=== Records ===
- Powderfinger are the first band ever to get three songs in the Top 10.
- Frenzal Rhomb holds the record of having the shortest song in the Hottest 100, with "Russell Crowe's Band" at 1:12.
- The song "Clocks" by Coldplay charted in the countdown for the second year in a row after a remix by Röyksopp featured at No. 5
- The Living End and Something for Kate made their seventh consecutive appearance in the Hottest 100, with both bands having at least one track featured in every annual countdown since 1997. Similarly, Machine Gun Fellatio made their fifth consecutive appearance, having appeared in every annual countdown since 1999.

== Top 10 Albums of 2003 ==
Bold indicates winner of the Hottest 100.

#	Artist	Album	Country of origin	Tracks in the Hottest 100
1	Powderfinger	Vulture Street	Australia	4, 7, 10, 76, 77
2	The White Stripes	Elephant	United States	3, 14, 89, 93, 94
3	Radiohead	Hail to the Thief	United Kingdom	48, 49
4	**Jet**	**Get Born**	**Australia**	**1, 19 (24, 89 in 2004)**
5	Jack Johnson	On & On	United States	17, 24, 40
6	Something for Kate	The Official Fiction	Australia	11, 63
7	Ben Harper	Diamonds On the Inside	United States	18, 29
8	John Butler Trio	Living 2001–2002	Australia	51
9	Muse	Absolution	United Kingdom	31, 42, 69
10	The Living End	Modern ARTillery	Australia	23, 66 (52 in 2002)

== CD release ==
**CD 1**
1. Jet – "Are You Gonna Be My Girl"
2. Hilltop Hoods – "The Nosebleed Section"
3. Jane's Addiction – "Just Because"
4. The Dandy Warhols – "We Used to Be Friends"
5. Something for Kate – "Déjà Vu"
6. Cody ChesnuTT – "Look Good in Leather"
7. Little Birdy – "Baby Blue"
8. The Sleepy Jackson – "Vampire Racecourse"
9. The Herd – "77%"
10. John Butler Trio – "Zebra"
11. Placebo – "The Bitter End"
12. Radiohead – "There There"
13. Basement Jaxx – "Good Luck"
14. Electric Six – "Gay Bar"
15. The Waifs – "Lighthouse"
16. Magic Dirt – "Plastic Loveless Letter"
17. AFI – "The Leaving Song Pt. II"
18. The Beautiful Girls – "Black Bird"
19. Pete Murray – "Feeler"
20. Skeewiff – "Man of Constant Sorrow"
**CD 2**
1. The Mars Volta – "Inertiatic ESP"
2. The Living End – "Who's Gonna Save Us?"
3. The Cat Empire – "Hello"
4. Chicks on Speed – "We Don't Play Guitars"
5. Ben Harper – "Diamonds on the Inside"
6. Butterfingers – "I Love Work"
7. Missy Higgins – "Greed For Your Love"
8. Chemical Brothers – "The Golden Path"
9. Offcuts – "Break It Down James Brown"
10. Machine Gun Fellatio – "Voices in My Head"
11. Nofx – "Franco Un-American"
12. The Butterfly Effect – "One Second of Insanity"
13. Michael Franti and Spearhead – "Everyone Deserves Music"
14. Epicure – "Life Sentence"
15. Belle and Sebastian – "Step into My Office Baby"
16. Junior Senior – "Move Your Feet"
17. Missy Elliott – "Pass That Dutch"
18. Gyroscope – "Doctor, Doctor"
19. Xavier Rudd – "Let Me Be"
20. Powderfinger – "(Baby I've Got You) On My Mind"

== DVD release ==
Volume 11 DVD Cover

The Hottest 100 DVD was the second such DVD, after the 2002 release.

1. Jet – Are You Gonna Be My Girl
2. Jane's Addiction – Just Because
3. The Dandy Warhols – We Used To Be Friends
4. Something for Kate – Déjà Vu (Radio Edit)
5. Cody ChesnuTT – Look Good in Leather
6. Little Birdy – Baby Blue
7. The Sleepy Jackson – Vampire Racecourse
8. The Herd – 77%
9. The John Butler Trio – Zebra
10. Placebo – The Bitter End
11. Radiohead – There There
12. Basement Jaxx – Good Luck (featuring Lisa Kekaula)
13. Electric Six – Gay Bar
14. The Waifs – Lighthouse
15. Magic Dirt – Plastic Loveless Letter
16. AFI – The Leaving Song Pt. II
17. Pete Murray – Feeler
18. The Mars Volta – Inertiatic ESP (Album Version)
19. The Living End – Who's Gonna Save Us
20. The Cat Empire – Hello
21. Chicks on Speed (featuring Peaches) – We Don't Play Guitars
22. Ben Harper – Diamonds On the Inside
23. Butterfingers – I Love Work
24. Missy Higgins – Greed For Your Love
25. Chemical Brothers – The Golden Path
26. Offcutts – Break It Down, James Brown
27. Machine Gun Fellatio – Voices in My Head
28. NOFX – Franco Un-American
29. The Butterfly Effect – One Second of Insanity
30. Michael Franti and Spearhead – Everyone Deserves Music
31. Belle and Sebastian – Step into My Office, Baby
32. Junior Senior – Move Your Feet (Radio Edit)
33. Missy Elliott – Pass That Dutch
34. Powderfinger – (Baby I've Got You) On My Mind

== See also ==
- 2003 in music
