= The Murmur Years =

The Murmur Years: The Best of Something for Kate 1996 - 2007

Greatest hits album by Something for Kate
- Released: 17 August 2007
- Genre: Rock, pop rock, alternative rock
- Label: Murmur

Something for Kate chronology
iTunes Originals - Something for Kate (2006)	The Murmur Years: The Best of Something for Kate 1996 - 2007 (2007)	Live at the Corner (2008)

The Murmur Years: The Best of Something for Kate 1996 - 2007, was a retrospective double compilation album issued in August 2007. It comprises 33 tracks by Australian rock band Something for Kate spanning more than 10 years of the band's career from 1996 to 2007. The band handpicked songs for the album from early EPs, their five studio albums, live favourites and covers, along with a new track, "The Futurist". It peaked at No. 26 on the ARIA Albums Chart in early September.

== Track listing ==
=== Disc 1 ===
1. "The Futurist"
2. "Déjà Vu"
3. "Captain (Million Miles an Hour)"
4. "Monsters"
5. "Hallways"
6. "Cigarettes and Suitcases"
7. "You Only Hide"
8. "The Last Minute"
9. "Oh Kamikaze"
10. "Beautiful Sharks"
11. "Light at the End of the Tunnel"
12. "Down the Garden Path"
13. "Twenty Years"
14. "Subject to Change"
15. "Back to You"
16. "Truly" (Live Bootleg)

=== Disc 2 ===
1. "Electricity"
2. "Three Dimensions"
3. "Pinstripe"
4. "California"
5. "Say Something"
6. "Whatever You want"
7. "Kaplan/Thornhill"
8. "Working Against Me"
9. "Jerry Stand Up"
10. "Song for a Sleepwalker"
11. "Strategy"
12. "Dean Martin"
13. "The Astronaut"
14. "Hanging on the Telephone" (Live)
15. "Rock the Casbah"
16. "Dreamworld"
17. "Born to Run"

== Charts ==
Chart (2007)	Peak position
Australian Albums (ARIA)	26

== Certifications ==
Region	Certification	Certified units/sales
Australia (ARIA)	Gold	35,000^{‡}
^{‡} Sales+streaming figures based on certification alone.

== Personnel ==
- Paul Dempsey - guitar, vocals
- Clint Hyndman - drums, percussion, backing vocals
- Stephanie Ashworth - bass guitar, backing vocals
