= The Deluge (Fanning Dempsey National Park album) =

Studio album by Fanning Dempsey National Park
- Released: 2 August 2024
- Length: 41:50
- Label: Dew Process
- Producer: Craig Silvey

Singles from The Deluge
- 1. "Disconnect" Released: 10 May 2024; 2. "The Deluge" Released: 28 June 2024; 3. "Born Expecting" Released: 19 July 2024

The Deluge is the debut studio album by Australian duo Bernard Fanning and Paul Dempsey credited as Fanning Dempsey National Park. The album was released on 2 August 2024.

The album will be supported with a five date Australian tour commencing in October 2024. Further dates were added in January 2025, commencing in April 2025.

At the 2024 ARIA Music Awards, the album was nominated for Best Adult Contemporary Album.

== Background ==
Fanning and Dempsey have been prevalent in the Australian music scene since the 1990s, with their groups, Powderfinger and Something for Kate respectively.

In August 2020, the duo uploaded a cover of "Under Pressure" onto YouTube, which was recorded during the COVID-19 lockdown in Australia. Fanning also contributed backing vocals on the Something for Kate track "Inside Job" on their 2020 album, The Modern Medieval.

In April 2024, the duo announced "devious plans" on social media. Upon release of "Disconnect" Fanning confirmed more music saying, "We didn't want it to sound like a Fanning record or a Dempsey record, we wanted it to sound like a band." The album was announced on 30 May 2024.

== Singles ==
"Disconnect" was released on 10 May 2024 as the album's lead single, following a fortnight of online teasers. Al Newstead from Australian Broadcasting Corporation called it "a barrelling number on which Fanning and Dempsey trade lead vocals over a triumphant, heartland rock backing." Mary Varvaris from The Music said "the song, features Ron Dziubla's saxophone, huge drums, synths, and a gorgeous lead melody that showcases Fanning and Dempsey's skillset." The song was shortlisted for Song o the Year at the APRA Music Awards of 2025.

The title track was released on 28 June 2024, which Mary Varvaris from The Music reviewed saying "A song that highlights both of the singers' bands melodic sensibilities with a little dash of Kraftwerk, 'The Deluge' is just the right balance of quirky, 80s-inspired electronic elements and rock and roll."

On 19 July 2024, the duo released "Born Expecting".

In January 2025, the duo released "Blackstar", the "missing cut on the album". On 2 May 2025, "King Pumpkin" was released, ahead of a national tour.

== Critical reception ==
Professional ratings
Review scores
Source	Rating
The Courier-Mail	4/5 stars
The AU Review	4/5 stars

The Courier-Mail said "Think of it as the eight-bit spiritual successor to Regurgitator's Unit." The Australian said "Bernard Fanning and Paul Dempsey's joint debut was created to establish something distinctly reflective of each musician's tastes, rather than merely an extension of their respective solo efforts."

Pace Proctor from The AU Review said "The Deluge is a simultaneous throwback in both genre and concept, with modern production, songwriting and instrumentation that keep it fresh and exciting. While crafting an album that not only pays homage to their musical influences but also boldly carves out new territory for themselves, Fanning and Dempsey provide an exclamation mark on an already stellar run while finding another standout moment in their already illustrious careers."

Andrew Stafford from The Guardian said "The Deluge (is) an album which harks back to Berlin-era Bowie, Gary Numan's Tubeway Army, new-wave era Robert Palmer, Duran Duran and Foreigner."

== Track listing ==
All tracks are written by Fanning, Dempsey.

The Deluge track listing
No.	Title	Length
1.	"The Deluge"	4:15
2.	"Born Expecting"	4:01
3.	"Disconnect"	3:44
4.	"Eyes Wide Open"	4:08
5.	"Blood"	3:34
6.	"Never Pass This Way Again"	3:55
7.	"Strangers"	3:25
8.	"Past Tomorrow"	4:53
9.	"Dunning Kruger National Park"	5:13
10.	"King of Nowhere"	4:42
Total length:		41:50

== Personnel ==
Fanning Dempsey National Park

- Bernard Fanning – vocals, guitar, synthesizer
- Paul Dempsey – vocals, bass, guitar, percussion, synthesizer

Additional personnel

- Nick DiDia – engineering
- Ron Dziubla – saxophone
- Adam MacDougall – keyboards, synthesizer
- Craig Macfarland – bass
- Craig Silvey – production, mixing, drum programming
- Dani Bennett Spragg – engineering
- Simon Struthers – mastering
- Michael Urbano – drum programming, drums

== Charts ==
=== Weekly charts ===
Weekly chart performance for The Deluge
Chart (2024)	Peak position
Australian Albums (ARIA)	3

=== Year-end charts ===
2024 year-end chart performance for The Deluge
Chart (2024)	Position
Australian Artist Albums (ARIA)	38
