= Desert Lights =

Studio album by Something for Kate
- Released: 1 June 2006
- Genre: Alternative rock
- Length: 43:25
- Label: Murmur
- Producer: Brad Wood

Something for Kate chronology
| Phantom Limbs: Selected B-Sides (2004) | Desert Lights (2006) | iTunes Originals - Something for Kate (2007) |

Singles from Desert Lights
- 1. "Cigarettes and Suitcases" Released: May 2006; 2. "Oh Kamikaze" Released: September 2006; 3. "California" Released: March 2007

Desert Lights is the fifth studio album by Australian band, Something for Kate, released on 1 June 2006. It peaked at No. 1 on the ARIA Charts – their second studio album to do so after The Official Fiction (August 2003). Desert Lights was accredited gold by ARIA for shipment of 35,000 copies by the end of 2006.

== Background ==
Something for Kate were established in 1994 as an alternative rock band in Melbourne. By 1998 the line-up was Paul Dempsey on lead vocals, guitar and keyboards; Clint Hyndman on drums and percussion and Stephanie Ashworth on bass guitar, percussion and backing vocals. Something for Kate had issued their fourth studio album, The Official Fiction in August 2003, which became their first number-one album.

Desert Lights, their fifth studio album was issued on 1 June 2006, which also topped the charts – their second number-one album. It was accredited gold record status within a month of its release for shipment of 35,000 copies. They had recorded it over four months in Los Angeles with production by Brad Wood (Ben Lee, the Smashing Pumpkins, Liz Phair). It provided three singles, "Cigarettes and Suitcases" (May 2006), "Oh Kamikaze" (September) and "California" (March 2007).

== Track listing ==
All tracks are written by Stephanie Ashworth, Paul Dempsey, Clint Hyndman, unless noted otherwise

| No. | Title | Length |
|---|---|---|
| 1. | "California" | 3:42 |
| 2. | "Down the Garden Path" | 4:54 |
| 3. | "Cigarettes and Suitcases" | 4:04 |
| 4. | "This Is the Life for Me" | 3:59 |
| 5. | "A Fool's History Part 1" | 3:37 |
| 6. | "Oh Kamikaze" | 3:55 |
| 7. | "Impossible" | 4:58 |
| 8. | "Transparanoia" | 4:53 |
| 9. | "Statues" | 4:13 |
| 10. | "Washed out to Sea" | 5:07 |
| Total length: | | 43:25 |

=== Bonus Bootleg Disc ===
(from the limited edition 2 CD version)

1. "Three Dimensions" (Live at the Zoo)
2. "Hawaiian Robots" (Live at the Zoo)
3. "Prick" (Live at the Zoo)
4. "Pinstripe" (Live at the Zoo)
5. "Déjà Vu" (Live at the Zoo)
6. "Born to Run" (originally recorded by Bruce Springsteen)

Live tracks are taken from two concerts at live music venue, The Zoo, in Fortitude Valley, Brisbane, on 20 and 21 May 2006.

=== Deluxe edition bonus disc ===
The 2014 deluxe edition included a bonus disc of the album's B-sides.

==== Track listing ====
1. "Three Dimensions (Live at the Zoo)" - 3:44
2. "Hawaiian Robots (Live at the Zoo)" - 5:04
3. "Prick (Live at the Zoo)" - 3:55
4. "Pinstripe (Live at the Zoo)" - 5:55
5. "Déjà vu (Live at the Zoo)" - 4:49
6. "Born to Run" (Bruce Springsteen) - 4:33
7. "The Actor Makes His Move" - 3:39
8. "The Killing Moon" (Will Sergeant, Ian McCulloch, Les Pattinson, Pete de Freitas) - 4:25
9. "Prick (Live at the POW)" - 3:59
10. "Airport Kid" - 4:07
11. "The Amazing Machine that Does Not Work - Demo version" - 4:34
12. "Close to Me" (Robert Smith) - 3:43
13. "Cassandra Walks the Plank" - 3:01
14. "Rock the Casbah" (Topper Headon, Joe Strummer, Mick Jones) - 3:49
15. "Oh Kamikaze (T-Rek Remix)" - 7:44
16. "The Futurist" - 4:05

== Charts ==
| Chart (2006) | Peak position |
|---|---|
| Australian Albums (ARIA) | 1 |

== Certifications ==
| Region | Certification | Certified units/sales |
|---|---|---|
| Australia (ARIA) | Gold | 35,000^{^} |
^{^} Shipments figures based on certification alone.

== Personnel ==
Something for Kate

- Paul Dempsey – guitar, vocals
- Clint Hyndman – drums, percussion, backing vocals
- Stephanie Ashworth – bass guitar, backing vocals

Additional personnel

- Mike Garson – piano on "Washed Out to Sea"
- Pete Yorn – backing vocals on "California"
- Brad Wood – backing vocals
- Jaye Ellah – backing vocals
- Chick Molverton – backing vocals

== Release history ==
| Region | Date | Format | Edition(s) | Label | Catalogue |
|---|---|---|---|---|---|
| Australia | June 2006 | CD; LP; Digital | Standard | Murmur | MATTCD136 |
| Australia | July 2014 | 2×CD; LP | Deluxe Edition, Reissue | Murmur, Sony Music Australia | 88843074362 |
| Australia | August 2018 | LP | Limited Edition, Reissue | Sony Music Australia | 88843074881 |
