= Monsters (Something for Kate song) =

Single by Something for Kate

from the album Echolalia
- B-side: Hawaiian Robots "The Astronaut" (Live Acoustic) "Submarine" "Monsters" (Album Version)
- Released: 30 April 2001
- Studio: Mangrove Studio
- Genre: Indie rock
- Label: Murmur
- Songwriters: Clint Hyndman, Paul Dempsey, Stephanie Ashworth
- Producers: Trina Shoemaker, Something for Kate

Something for Kate singles chronology
"Say Something" (2002)	"Monsters" (2001)	"Three Dimensions" (2003)

Monsters is a song by Australian indie rock group, Something for Kate. It was released on 30 April 2001, as the lead single ahead of their third studio album, Echolalia (2001), and peaked at No.15 on the ARIA Singles Charts. The song was nominated for Single of the Year at the 2001 ARIA Music Awards, and Song of the Year at the APRA Music Awards of 2002. The song was voted second by Triple J listeners in the Triple J Hottest 100, 2001, and 88th in the Triple J Hottest 100 of the Past 20 Years in 2013.

== Music video ==
The Bart Borghesi directed music video for "Monsters" was nominated for the ARIA Award for Best Video in 2001, but lost to "Wake Up" by Eskimo Joe.

== Track listing ==
All tracks are written by Something for Kate.

Australian CD single
No.	Title	Length
1.	"Monsters" (Single Version)	3:39
2.	"Hawaiian Robots"	4:53
3.	"The Astronaut" (Live Acoustic)	3:11
4.	"Submarine"	5:17
5.	"Monsters" (Album Version)	4:29

== Charts ==
Chart (2001)	Peak position
Australia (ARIA)	15
