= Strange Loop (album) =

Studio album by Paul Dempsey
- Released: 13 May 2016
- Venue: The Loft
- Label: EMI
- Producers: Tom Schick and Paul Dempsey

Paul Dempsey chronology
Shotgun Karaoke (2013)	Strange Loop (2016)	Shotgun Karaoke Vol. II (2025)

Singles from Strange Loop
- 1. "Morningless" Released: 3 February 2016; 2. "The True Sea" Released: 15 April 2016; 3. "Idiot Oracle" Released: 27 May 2016

Strange Loop is the third studio album by Australian singer–songwriter Paul Dempsey. Dempsey. The album was released in May 2016 and peaked at number 5 on the ARIA Charts.

Dempsey said "With every new song and each new record you just hope to chisel everything a little cleaner than last time, paint the scenery in more precise detail and give some extra dimensions to the stories and also to have as much fun as possible creating all the accompanying noise. I feel completely satisfied that I've done that with this record."

== Reception ==
Professional ratings
Review scores
Source	Rating
The AU Review	9/10 stars
The Music	4.5/5 stars

Sosefina Fuamoli from The AU Review said "Dempsey has long been regarded as one of the country's best songwriters and on this new album, he has continued to showcase a talent for weaving intricate and earnest lyricism through musical arrangements that long-time fans are likely to immediately warm to, while newcomers are bound to have their heads turned."

Dylan Stewart from The Music called the album "captivating" and said Paul Dempsey has inspired countless imitators, none of whom have been able to combine his complex lyrics with his soaring vocals. Strange Loop, while centred on Dempsey's folksier persona compared to his sometimes violent front man status with Something for Kate, is exhibit A."

Australian Musician said described the album as "an 11 track, 48 minute long aural presentation, showcasing Dempsey’s considerable song-writing and instrumental prowess."

== Track listing ==
- All songs written and arranged by Paul Dempsey.
1. "The True Sea"
2. "Strange Loop"
3. "Idiot Oracle"
4. "Hey History (Don't Go Changin')"
5. "Lifetime Supply"
6. "Morningless"
7. "Be Somebody"
8. "Blindspot"
9. "Iris Black"
10. "Volunteers"
11. "Nobody's Trying to Tell Me Something"

== Charts ==
Chart (2016)	Peak position
Australian Albums (ARIA)	5
