= Everything Is True =

Everything is True

Studio album by Paul Dempsey
- Released: 20 August 2009
- Genre: Australian rock
- Label: EMI
- Producer: Wayne Connolly, Paul Dempsey

Paul Dempsey chronology
Everything is True (2009)	Shotgun Karaoke (2013)

Singles from Everything Is True
- 1. "Out the Airlock" Released: 15 May 2009; 2. "Ramona Was a Waitress" Released: 2009; 3. "Fast Friends" Released: November 2009; 4. "Bats" Released: March 2010

Professional ratings
Review scores
Source	Rating
Allmusic	3.5/5 stars

Everything is True is a solo album by Australian singer–songwriter Paul Dempsey. Dempsey, who rose to fame with his band Something For Kate, played every instrument that appears on the album.

At the ARIA Music Awards of 2009, Dempsey and the album were nominated for three ARIA Awards: ARIA Award for Best Male Artist, ARIA Award for Best Adult Contemporary Album and ARIA Award for Producer of the Year.

At the J Awards of 2009, the album was nominated for Australian Album of the Year.

== Background ==
Dempsey has revealed that he was initially reluctant to record the album, but was encouraged by his two other bandmates from Something For Kate. Clint Hindman, the drummer, had opened a bar in his hometown of Melbourne, Australia, and bassist, Stephanie Ashworth, was exploring other pursuits such as photography while Dempsey worked on the album.

== Track listing ==
1. "Bats"
2. "Fast Friends"
3. "Out of the Airlock"
4. "Ramona Was a Waitress"
5. "Take Us to Your Leader"
6. "Bird in a Basement"
7. "Theme from Nice Guy"
8. "Have You Fallen Out of Love?"
9. "The Great Optimist"
10. "Safety in Numbness"
11. "Man of the Moment"

== Charts ==
Chart (2009)	Peak position
Australian Albums (ARIA)	5

== Certifications ==
Region	Certification	Certified units/sales
Australia (ARIA)	Gold	35,000^{^}
^{^} Shipments figures based on certification alone.
