= Triple J's Hottest 100 of the Past 20 Years =

20th anniversary of Australian annual music poll

20 Years Triple J Hottest 100

Countdown details
- Date of countdown: 8-9 June 2013

Countdown highlights
- Winning song: Oasis "Wonderwall"
- Most entries: Dave Grohl; The Killers; Silverchair; Damon Albarn; Daft Punk (3 tracks)

Chronology
← Previous; 2012	Next → 2013

The Triple J Hottest 100 of the Past 20 Years was a poll conducted by Triple J to celebrate the 20th anniversary of the Hottest 100's current format. Voters were allowed to vote for 20 songs that were released from 1 January 1993 until 31 December 2012. Voting was open for 20 days from 14 May to 2 June. The first half of the countdown was broadcast on 8 June and the second half was broadcast the following day. Approximately 940,000 votes were received.

== Full list ==
- Bold: Previous winner of an annual Hottest 100
- Green background: Australian artists

#	Song	Artist	Country of origin	Year of release	Previous position (annual countdown) (Note: Year is specified if different from year of release)	Previous position (all-time countdown)
**1**	**Wonderwall**	**Oasis**	**United Kingdom**	**1995**	**1**	**12 (2009)**
2	Seven Nation Army	The White Stripes	United States	2003	3	20 (2009)
3	Last Goodbye	Jeff Buckley	United States	1994	14 (1995)	4 (1998), 7 (2009)
4	The Nosebleed Section	Hilltop Hoods	Australia	2003	9	17 (2009)
5	Bitter Sweet Symphony	The Verve	United Kingdom	1997	4	99 (1998), 14 (2009)
6	Everlong	Foo Fighters	United States	1997	61 (2006) (Note: Live acoustic version)	9 (2009)
7	Mr. Brightside	The Killers	United States	2003	13 (2004)	38 (2009)
**8**	**These Days**	**Powderfinger**	**Australia**	**1999**	**1**	**21 (2009)**
**9**	**Somebody That I Used to Know**	**Gotye featuring Kimbra**	**Australia/New Zealand**	**2011**	**1**	
**10**	**My Happiness**	**Powderfinger**	**Australia**	**2000**	**1**	**27 (2009)**
**11**	**No One Knows**	**Queens of the Stone Age**	**United States**	**2002**	**1**	**45 (2009)**
12	Hearts a Mess	Gotye	Australia	2006	8	77 (2009)
13	Paranoid Android	Radiohead	United Kingdom	1997	7	13 (1998), 5 (2009)
**14**	**Little Lion Man**	**Mumford & Sons**	**United Kingdom**	**2009**	**1**	
15	Breathe	The Prodigy	United Kingdom	1996	7	95 (1998), 70 (2009)
16	Skinny Love	Bon Iver	United States	2007	21 (2008)	92 (2009)
17	Tomorrow	Silverchair	Australia	1994	5	59 (1998), 33 (2009)
18	Hey Ya!	OutKast	United States	2003	2	
19	Dammit	Blink-182	United States	1997	6	20 (1998), 68 (2009)
20	Prisoner of Society	The Living End	Australia	1997	15	18 (1998), 34 (2009)
21	1979	The Smashing Pumpkins	United States	1995	13 (1996)	71 (1998), 35 (2009)
22	Song 2	Blur	United Kingdom	1997	2	46 (1998), 61 (2009)
**23**	**Knights of Cydonia**	**Muse**	**United Kingdom**	**2006**	**1 (2007)**	**18 (2009)**
**24**	**One Crowded Hour**	**Augie March**	**Australia**	**2006**	**1**	**59 (2009)**
25	Bullet with Butterfly Wings	The Smashing Pumpkins	United States	1995	2	33 (1998), 51 (2009)
26	Chop Suey!	System of a Down	United States	2001	3	82 (2009)
27	Frontier Psychiatrist	The Avalanches	Australia	2000	6	
28	Scar Tissue	Red Hot Chili Peppers	United States	1999	10	
**29**	**Take Me Out**	**Franz Ferdinand**	**United Kingdom**	**2004**	**1**	**100 (2009)**
30	Californication	Red Hot Chili Peppers	United States	1999	7 (2000)	
31	Teardrop	Massive Attack	United Kingdom	1998	23	22 (2009)
32	Stinkfist	Tool	United States	1996	2	24 (1998), 37 (2009)
**33**	**Zombie**	**The Cranberries**	**Ireland**	**1994**	**1**	
34	Brick	Ben Folds Five	United States	1997	12 (1998)	32 (1998), 67 (2009)
35	Karma Police	Radiohead	United Kingdom	1997	9	54 (1998), 15 (2009)
36	Hallelujah	Jeff Buckley	United States	1994		3 (2009)
37	Sabotage	Beastie Boys	United States	1994	16	44 (1998), 48 (2009)
38	Sweet Disposition	The Temper Trap	Australia	2008		
39	Heart-Shaped Box	Nirvana	United States	1993	20	
40	Closer	Nine Inch Nails	United States	1994	2	14 (1998), 62 (2009)
41	Yellow	Coldplay	United Kingdom	2000	5	87 (2009)
42	Brother	Matt Corby	Australia	2011	3	
43	Betterman	John Butler Trio	Australia	2001	5	47 (2009)
44	One More Time	Daft Punk	France/United States	2000	61 (2001)	96 (2009)
45	Float On	Modest Mouse	United States	2004	11	94 (2009)
46	Into My Arms	Nick Cave & the Bad Seeds	Australia	1997	18	84 (1998), 36 (2009)
47	Self Esteem	The Offspring	United States	1994	3	80 (1998)
48	Last Nite	The Strokes	United States	2001	12	
49	Dog Days Are Over	Florence & the Machine	United Kingdom	2009	10	
50	Better Man	Pearl Jam	United States	1994	44 (1995)	22 (1998), 39 (2009)
51	Bohemian Like You	The Dandy Warhols	United States	2000	10	85 (2009)
52	Feel Good Inc.	Gorillaz featuring De La Soul	United Kingdom/United States	2005	3	
53	Every You Every Me	Placebo	United Kingdom	1998	5 (1999)	83 (2009)
**54**	**Sex on Fire**	**Kings of Leon**	**United States**	**2008**	**1**	**90 (2009)**
55	Praise You	Fatboy Slim	United Kingdom	1998	4 (1999)	
56	Born Slippy .NUXX	Underworld	United Kingdom	1995	12 (1996)	65 (2009)
57	Banquet	Bloc Party	United Kingdom	2005		42 (2009)
**58**	**No Aphrodisiac**	**The Whitlams**	**Australia**	**1997**	**1**	**36 (1998)**
59	Around the World	Daft Punk	France	1997		58 (2009)
60	Glycerine	Bush	United Kingdom	1994	5 (1996)	
61	Lonely Boy	The Black Keys	United States	2011	2	
**62**	**Buy Me a Pony**	**Spiderbait**	**Australia**	**1996**	**1**	**86 (1998)**
63	Chemical Heart	Grinspoon	Australia	2002	2	
64	Kids	MGMT	United States	2007	5 (2008)	
65	Harder, Better, Faster, Stronger	Daft Punk	France	2001	7 (2007) (Note: Alive 2007 version)	
66	Berlin Chair	You Am I	Australia	1993	23 (1994)	61 (1998), 52 (2009)
67	Breezeblocks	alt-J	United Kingdom	2012	3	
**68**	**Are You Gonna Be My Girl**	**Jet**	**Australia**	**2003**	**1**	
69	Lose Yourself	Eminem	United States	2002	7	
70	! (The Song Formerly Known As)	Regurgitator	Australia	1997	6 (1998)	
71	Clint Eastwood	Gorillaz	United Kingdom	2001	9	
72	Joker & the Thief	Wolfmother	Australia	2005	9	
73	Home	Edward Sharpe & the Magnetic Zeros	United States	2009	15	
74	Let's Dance to Joy Division	The Wombats	United Kingdom	2007	12	
75	Somebody Told Me	The Killers	United States	2004	4	
76	Electric Feel	MGMT	United States	2007	2 (2008)	
77	My People	The Presets	Australia	2007	18	
78	Freak	Silverchair	Australia	1997	13	
79	I Bet You Look Good on the Dancefloor	Arctic Monkeys	United Kingdom	2005	50	
80	Bulls on Parade	Rage Against the Machine	United States	1996	46	89 (2009)
**81**	**Big Jet Plane**	**Angus & Julia Stone**	**Australia**	**2010**	**1**	
82	Teenage Dirtbag	Wheatus	United States	2000	4	
83	Common People	Pulp	United Kingdom	1995	38	81 (2009)
84	Gold Digger	Kanye West featuring Jamie Foxx	United States	2005	13	
85	Gangsta's Paradise	Coolio featuring L.V.	United States	1995	3	
86	When You Were Young	The Killers	United States	2006	4	
87	Naïve	The Kooks	United Kingdom	2006		
88	Monsters	Something for Kate	Australia	2001	2	
89	Wolf Like Me	TV on the Radio	United States	2006	63	99 (2009)
90	Straight Lines	Silverchair	Australia	2007	2	
91	Harpoon	Jebediah	Australia	1997	7 (1998)	
92	Little Talks	Of Monsters & Men	Iceland	2011	2 (2012)	
93	Black Hole Sun	Soundgarden	United States	1994	22	58 (1998)
94	Pumped Up Kicks	Foster the People	United States	2010	32	
95	Cigarettes Will Kill You	Ben Lee	Australia	1998	2	
96	Hello	The Cat Empire	Australia	2003	6	
97	Paper Planes	M.I.A.	United Kingdom	2007	17	
98	Leaving Home	Jebediah	Australia	1997	10	50 (1998)
99	Video Games	Lana Del Rey	United States	2011	6	
100	Intergalactic	Beastie Boys	United States	1998	25	

== Artists with multiple entries ==
#	Artist	Tracks
3	Dave Grohl (Note: Once with the Foo Fighters (6), once with Queens of the Stone Age (11) and once with Nirvana (39))	6, 11, 39
3	The Killers	7, 75, 86
3	Silverchair	17, 78, 90
3	Damon Albarn (Note: Once with Blur (22), twice with Gorillaz (52, 71))	22, 52, 71
3	Daft Punk	44, 59, 65
2	Jeff Buckley	3, 36
2	Powderfinger	8, 10
2	Gotye	9, 12
2	Radiohead	13, 35
2	The Smashing Pumpkins	21, 25
2	Red Hot Chili Peppers	28, 30
2	Beastie Boys	37, 100
2	Gorillaz	52, 71
2	MGMT	64, 76
2	Jebediah	91, 98

== Nations represented ==
Country	Count
United States	43
Australia	29
United Kingdom	25
France	3
Iceland	1
Ireland	1
New Zealand	1

== Songs by decade ==
Decade	Song Count
1990s	44
2000s	48
2010s	8

== Notes ==
- No. 101 was Zebra by the John Butler Trio

== CD Release ==
Disc 1
No.	Title	Artist(s)	Length
1.	"Wonderwall" (#1)	Oasis	4:19
2.	"Mr. Brightside" (#7)	The Killers	3:43
3.	"The Nosebleed Section" (#4)	Hilltop Hoods	3:37
4.	"Somebody That I Used to Know" (#9)	Gotye featuring Kimbra	4:04
5.	"Last Goodbye" (#3)	Jeff Buckley	4:35
6.	"Knights of Cydonia" (#23)	Muse	4:47
7.	"One More Time" (#44)	Daft Punk	3:55
8.	"! (The Song Formerly Known As)" (#70)	Regurgitator	3:26
9.	"No One Knows" (#11)	Queens of the Stone Age	4:39
10.	"Little Lion Man" (#14)	Mumford & Sons	4:02
11.	"Video Games" (#99)	Lana Del Rey	4:42
12.	"These Days" (#8)	Powderfinger	4:13
13.	"Feel Good Inc." (#52)	Gorillaz featuring De La Soul	3:41
14.	"Bohemian Like You" (#51)	The Dandy Warhols	3:31
15.	"My People" (#77)	The Presets	4:26
16.	"Paper Planes" (#97)	M.I.A.	3:23
17.	"Chemical Heart" (#63)	Grinspoon	4:39
18.	"Bitter Sweet Symphony" (#5)	The Verve	4:35
19.	"Float On" (#45)	Modest Mouse	3:28

Disc 2
No.	Title	Artist(s)	Length
1.	"Seven Nation Army" (#2)	The White Stripes	3:51
2.	"Paranoid Android" (#13)	Radiohead	6:22
3.	"Dog Days Are Over" (#49)	Florence and the Machine	4:10
4.	"Sweet Disposition" (#38)	The Temper Trap	3:52
5.	"One Crowded Hour" (#24)	Augie March	4:12
6.	"Gangsta's Paradise" (#85)	Coolio featuring L.V.	4:01
7.	"Breathe" (#15)	The Prodigy	3:59
8.	"Berlin Chair" (#66)	You Am I	2:35
9.	"Zombie" (#33)	The Cranberries	5:06
10.	"Let's Dance to Joy Division" (#74)	The Wombats	3:11
11.	"Dammit" (#19)	Blink-182	2:45
12.	"Kids" (#64)	MGMT	5:02
13.	"Hey Ya!" (#18)	OutKast	4:09
14.	"Big Jet Plane" (#81)	Angus & Julia Stone	3:58
15.	"Tomorrow" (#17)	Silverchair	4:26
16.	"Song 2" (#22)	Blur	2:02
17.	"Buy Me a Pony" (#62)	Spiderbait	1:43
18.	"Banquet" (#57)	Bloc Party	3:18
19.	"Skinny Love" (#16)	Bon Iver	3:49
20.	"Teardrop" (#31)	Massive Attack	5:27
