= Beautiful Sharks =

Studio album by Something for Kate
- Released: 7 June 1999
- Recorded: Sing Sing Studios, Hothouse Studios
- Genre: Alternative rock
- Length: 48:55
- Label: Murmur
- Producer: Brian Paulson

Something for Kate chronology
Elsewhere for 8 Minutes (1997)	Beautiful Sharks (1999)	Q & A with Dean Martin (2000)

Singles from Beautiful Sharks
- 1. "Electricity" Released: March 1999; 2. "Hallways" Released: August 1999; 3. "Whatever You Want" Released: November 1999; 4. "The Astronaut" Released: March 2000

Beautiful Sharks is the second studio album by Australian band Something for Kate, released in June 1999. It marked a change in musical direction for the band, employing interesting and unconventional chord progressions and production. Sounding more sparse and open than their intense debut effort, the album produced four singles: "Electricity", "Whatever You Want", "The Astronaut" and "Hallways". It also had a limited edition release as a two-CD package, with multimedia content on the second disc. At the ARIA Music Awards of 2001, the album was nominated for Best Adult Alternative Album.

It was the first album recorded with bass player Stephanie Ashworth, although some b-sides released at the time were from recording sessions with Toby Ralph on bass.

Explaining the album title, frontman and songwriter Paul Dempsey said: "I guess the reason I put the two words together it because the shark is an animal that is both beautiful and graceful, but it will turn around and bite you. The theme of the album has a lot to do with humans and the technology we've created and where we're heading. It's beautiful, it's wonderful what we've created for ourselves, but it is going to turn around and bite us."

He said the first single, "Electricity", was about energy: "I wish sometimes that I was a pulse of energy … I'm always moving too fast for myself. Nothing's happening quick enough for me, I've always got about 500 things that I want to be doing. That's the thing behind 'Electricity'—I want to anticipate things before they happen. It's about movement and energy and speed, wanting to be a pulse of energy rather than being constrained by physics and flesh and bone."

== Track listing ==
(All songs by Something for Kate except where noted)

1. "Whatever You Want" – 3.53
2. "Hallways" – 3:03
3. "Beautiful Sharks" – 3:57
4. "Electricity" – 3:50
5. "Big Screen Television" – 4:33
6. "The Astronaut" – 3:42
7. "Easy" – 4:26
8. "Slowdance" – 4:35
9. "Before Butterfly's Wings" – 4:23
10. "Anchorman" – 4:54
11. "Back to You" – 3:57
12. "Photograph" – 3:38

=== Deluxe edition bonus disc ===
The 2014 deluxe edition included a bonus disc of the album's B-sides.

==== Track listing ====
1. "Sleep is Worth the Wait" - 5:58
2. "Pinstripe - Acoustic version" - 5:56
3. "Colored Chalk" - 4:10
4. "Easy (Mr Barrow & Mr Yates Surfin' for Kate Remix)" - 3:25
5. "Mental Note" - 4:39
6. "Electricity (Live at the Wireless)" - 3:56
7. "Snapshot" - 5:46
8. "Back to You - Piano version" - 4:41
9. "Belief=Function=Belief" - 4:54
10. "Beautiful Sharks - Revisited" - 4:10
11. "Born Yesterday" - 4:33
12. "Ordinary World" (Simon Le Bon, Warren Cuccurullo, Nick Rhodes, John Taylor) - 6:07
13. "Like Bankrobbers (Live at the Wireless)" - 5:09

== Charts ==
Chart (1999)	Peak position
Australian Albums (ARIA)	10

== Certifications ==
Region	Certification	Certified units/sales
Australia (ARIA)	Platinum	70,000^{‡}
^{‡} Sales+streaming figures based on certification alone.

== Personnel ==
- Paul Dempsey - guitars, vocals
- Stephanie Ashworth - bass
- Clint Hyndman - drums
- Glenn Richards - backing vocals ("Whatever You Want")
- Gareth Skinner - strings ("Slowdance")

== Release history ==
Region	Date	Format	Edition(s)	Label	Catalogue
Australia	June 1999	CD; LP	Standard	Murmur	MATTCD085
Australia	June 1999	CD+CD_Rom	Limited Edition	Murmur	MATTCD085E
Australia	July 2014	2×CD; LP	Deluxe Edition, Reissue	Murmur, Sony Music Australia	88843074342
Australia	August 2018	LP	Limited Edition, Reissue	Sony Music Australia	88843074851
