= Phantom Limbs: Selected B-Sides =

Compilation album by Something for Kate
- Released: 20 August 2004
- Recorded: 1997–2003
- Genre: Alternative rock
- Length: 142:39
- Label: Murmur
- Producer: Various

Something for Kate chronology
| The Official Fiction (2003) | Phantom Limbs: Selected B-Sides (2004) | Desert Lights (2006) |

Phantom Limbs: Selected B-Sides is a compilation double album by Australian band Something for Kate. Released in 2004, it contains B-sides from singles released from their first four albums, including live versions and cover versions of songs by artists including David Bowie, Duran Duran and Australian rock band Jebediah.

== Track listing ==
=== Disc One ===
(All songs by Something for Kate except where noted)

1. "Hawaiian Robots" (B-side to 'Monsters') – 4:53 [2001]
2. "All the Things That Aren't Good About Scientology" (B-side to 'Working Against Me') – 3:58 [1998]
3. "Born Yesterday" (B-side to 'The Astronaut') – 4:33 [2000]
4. "Losing My Mind" (B-side to 'Déjà vu') – 4:55 [2003]
5. "Chapel Street Etc." (B-side to 'Captain (Million Miles an Hour)') – 4:34 [1997]
6. "You Can't Please Everybody, Rockwell" (B-side to 'Roll Credit') – 4:48 [1998]
7. "3 x 2" (B-side to 'Prick') – 6:41 [1997]
8. "The Green Line Is Us, the Red Line Is Them" (B-side to 'Three Dimensions') – 5:23 [2001]
9. "Sleep Is Worth the Wait" (B-side to 'Electricity') – 5:57 [1999]
10. "Telescope" (B-side to 'Working Against Me') – 6:37 [1998]
11. "Blueprint Architecture" (B-side to 'Déjà vu') – 3:30 [2003]
12. "Mental Note" (B-side to 'Hallways') – 4:39 [1999]
13. "Belief = Function = Belief" (B-side to 'Whatever You Want') – 4:53 [1999]
14. "Coloured Chalk" (B-side to 'Electricity') – 4:11 [1999]
15. "Submarine" (B-side to 'Monsters') – 5:15 [2001]

=== Disc Two ===
1. "Faster" (B-side to 'Song for a Sleepwalker') – 5:42 [2003]
2. "Anchorman II" (B-side to 'Song for a Sleepwalker') – 4:50 [2003]
3. "A Remarkable Lack of Foresight" (B-side to 'Twenty Years') – 5:25 [2001]
4. "Dreamworld (Midnight Oil song)" (Jim Moginie) (B-side to 'Say Something') – 3:48 [2002]
5. "Harpoon" (Jebediah) (B-side to 'Roll Credit') – 4:21 [1998]
6. "Ordinary World" (Simon Le Bon, Warren Cuccurullo, Nick Rhodes, John Taylor) (B-side to 'The Astronaut') – 6:07 [2000]
7. "Ashes to Ashes" (Live at the POW) (David Bowie) (B-side to 'Moving Right Along') – 4:36 [2004]
8. "Whatever You Want" (live at the Chapel) (B-side to 'Say Something') – 4:15 [2002]
9. "The Astronaut" (live acoustic) (B-side to 'Monsters') – 3:10 [2001]
10. "Anchorman" (live at the Forum) (B-side to 'Twenty Years') – 5:21 [2001]
11. "You Only Hide" (live acoustic) (B-side to 'Déjà vu') – 4:17 [2003]
12. "Pinstripe" (acoustic) (B-side to 'Electricity') – 5:56 [1999]
13. "Back to You" (piano version) (B-side to 'Whatever You Want') – 4:40 [1999]
14. "Truly" (live bootleg) (Jody Bleyle) (never before released) – 5:24

== Charts ==
| Chart (2004) | Peak position |
|---|---|
| Australian Albums (ARIA) | 27 |

== Personnel ==
- Paul Dempsey – guitar, vocals
- Clint Hyndman – drums, percussion, backing vocals
- Stephanie Ashworth – bass guitar, backing vocals
