= Live at the Corner (Something for Kate album) =

Live album by Something for Kate
- Released: 23 February 2008
- Recorded: 23 February 2008
- Venue: Corner Hotel, Richmond
- Genre: Alternative rock
- Length: 71:24
- Label: New Found Frequency/Artist Controlled Bootleg
- Producer: Peter Frawley

Something for Kate chronology
The Murmur Years (2007)	Live at the Corner (2008)	Leave Your Soul to Science (2012)

Live at the Corner is a live album by Australian alternative rockers Something for Kate. It was produced by Peter Frawley, recorded and mixed by Sam Lowe for release on the same evening it was recorded. Justine Cleghorn of FasterLouder described it as an "Artist Controlled Bootleg", which captured the band's performance on 23 February 2008 at the Corner Hotel in Richmond. The limited release was also available at the following night's performance.

== Track listing ==
All tracks written by Stephanie Ashworth, Paul Dempsey and Clint Hyndman, unless otherwise noted.

1. "Stunt Show" (3:37)
2. "Prick" (4:25)
3. "Big Screen Television" (4:37)
4. "California" (4:02)
5. "Old Pictures" (4:02)
6. "Pinstripe" (3:34)
7. "Chapel St." (6:35)
8. "The Astronaut" (3:53)
9. "Deja Vu" (3:29)
10. "Back to You" (4:25)
11. "Reverse Soundtrack" (4:45)
12. "Ship of Fools" (Karl Wallinger) (4:54)
13. "This Is the Life for Me" (4:16)
14. "Down the Garden Path" (6:04)
15. "Monsters" (4:13)
16. "The Futurist" (4:33)

== Personnel ==
Something for Kate

- Stephanie Ashworth: – bass guitar
- Paul Dempsey: – vocals, guitar
- Clint Hyndman: – drums

Additional musicians

- Pip Branson: – guitar, violin, glockenspiel

Recording details

- Producer: – Peter Frawley
- Audio engineer: – Sean McVitty
- Mixing engineer: – Sam Lowe
  - Assistant mixing engineer: – Gene Shev
