= Live at the Corner =

Live at the Corner may refer to:

- Live at the Corner (Ash Grunwald), 2005
- Live at the Corner (Something for Kate album), 2008
- Live at the Corner (Tame Impala album), 2010
