= Phantom limb (disambiguation) =

A phantom limb is the sensation by an amputee that an amputated or missing limb is still attached to the body.

Phantom limb may also refer to:

- Phantom Limb (record label), a UK independent record label
- Phantom Limb (album), by Pig Destroyer
- Phantom Limb (band), from Bristol, England
- Phantom Limb (character), a fictional character in The Venture Bros. cartoon
- "Phantom Limb" (The Shins song), 2007
- "Phantom Limb" (Alice in Chains song), 2013
- "Phantom Limb", a song by GWAR from the album The Blood of Gods
- The Phantom Limbs, an American music band
- Phantom Limbs: Selected B-Sides, a compilation double album by Australian band Something for Kate
- "My Phantom Limb", a song by Swans from Leaving Meaning
