= Echolalia (album) =

Studio album by Something for Kate
- Released: 22 June 2001
- Recorded: Mangrove Studio
- Genre: Alternative rock
- Length: 52:31
- Label: Murmur, Red Ink
- Producer: Trina Shoemaker, Something for Kate

Something for Kate chronology
| Q & A with Dean Martin (2000) | Echolalia (2001) | The Official Fiction (2003) |

Singles from Echolalia
- 1. "Monsters" Released: 30 April 2001; 2. "Three Dimensions" Released: August 2001; 3. "Twenty Years" Released: November 2001; 4. "Say Something" Released: February 2002

Professional ratings
Review scores
| Source | Rating |
|---|---|
| AllMusic | 4/5 stars |

Echolalia is the third studio album by Australian alternative rock band Something for Kate which was released on 22 June 2001. It peaked at No. 2 on the ARIA Albums Chart, was voted the Best Album of 2001 by Triple J listeners and earned the band six ARIA Music Award nominations for Album of the Year, Best Adult Alternative Album, Single of the Year ("Monsters"), Best Group, Best Cover Art and Best Video ("Monsters"). It was issued in the United States and a limited edition US included a second disc titled "Past and Present Tension". The second disc included past songs and singles, as well as some live versions of their older songs. In October 2010, Echolalia was listed in the top 40 in the book, 100 Best Australian Albums.

== Track listing ==
(All songs by Something For Kate except where noted)

1. "Stunt Show" – 3:40
2. "Three Dimensions" – 4:08
3. "Jerry Stand Up" – 5:14
4. "Monsters" – 3:39
5. "Old Pictures" – 3:39
6. "You Only Hide" – 3:55
7. "Feeding the Birds and Hoping for Something in Return" – 4:02
8. "Twenty Years" – 4:13
9. "Say Something" – 2:52
10. "Manmade Horse" – 3:50
11. "Happy Endings" – 4:42
12. "Seasick" – 3:51
13. "White" – 4:39

=== Deluxe edition bonus disc ===
The 2014 deluxe edition included a bonus disc of the album's B-sides.

==== Track listing ====
1. "Hawaiian Robots" – 4:53
2. "The Astronaut (Live Acoustic version)" – 3:11
3. "Submarine" – 5:17
4. "The Green Line is Us, The Red Line is Them" – 5:23
5. "Monsters – Demo version" – 3:37
6. "Beautiful Sharks (Live at the Hi-Fi)" – 4:04
7. "A Remarkable Lack of Foresight" – 5:25
8. "Bankrobbers (Live at the Forum)" – 5:17
9. "Anchorman (Live at the Forum)" – 5:20
10. "Folded Paper Boats" – 3:39
11. "Whatever You Want (Live at the Chapel)" – 4:15
12. "Chapel Street Etc. (Live at the Chapel)" – 4:07
13. "Dreamworld" (Jim Moginie) – 3:47

== Charts ==
| Chart (2001–02) | Peak position |
|---|---|
| Australian Albums (ARIA) | 2 |

== Certifications ==
| Region | Certification | Certified units/sales |
|---|---|---|
| Australia (ARIA) | Platinum | 70,000^{^} |
^{^} Shipments figures based on certification alone.

== Personnel ==
- Paul Dempsey – guitars, vocals
- Stephanie Ashworth – bass
- Clint Hyndman – drums

== Release history ==
| Region | Date | Format | Edition(s) | Label | Catalogue |
|---|---|---|---|---|---|
| Australia | 22 June 2001 | CD; LP | Standard | Murmur | MATTCD111 |
| United States | 2002 | 2×CD | Standard + Enhanced | Murmur / RedInk | WK24026PRO |
| Australia | July 2014 | 2×CD; LP | Deluxe Edition, Reissue | Murmur, Sony Music Australia | 88843074332 |
| Australia | August 2018 | LP | Limited Edition, Reissue | Sony Music Australia | 88843074861 |
| Australia | December 2021 | LP | Limited Edition, Reissue | Sony Music Australia | 19439907691 |
