= Q & A with Dean Martin =

Compilation album by Something for Kate
- Released: 2000
- Genre: Alternative rock
- Length: 53:13
- Label: Murmur
- Producers: Greg Atkinson, Something for Kate

Something for Kate chronology
Beautiful Sharks (1999)	Q & A with Dean Martin (2000)	Echolalia (2001)

Q & A with Dean Martin is an album by Melbourne, Australia-based rock band Something for Kate. It is a re-release of the entire 1996 ....The Answer to Both Your Questions EP (Tracks 1 to 7) together with the "Dean Martin" single (Tracks 8 to 10), both of which were out of print and still in demand by fans. Despite a 50+ minute running time, Q & A with Dean Martin is considered to be a 'mini-album'.

== Track listing ==
1. "Subject to Change" – 3:21
2. "Higher Than You Think" – 6:03
3. "Tomorrow and the Next Day" – 3:59
4. "Picards Lament" – 3:27
5. "Slow" – 4:27
6. "Toothpaste" – 3:08
7. "Clint" – 5:19
8. "Dean Martin" – 4:37
9. "WW" – 4:03
10. "One Quarter of One Hour" – 14:49

== Release history ==
Region	Date	Format	Edition(s)	Label	Catalogue
Australia	2000	CD	Standard	Murmur	MATTCD098
Australia	July 2014	2×LP	Deluxe Edition, Reissue	Sony Music Australia	19075817761
