= Elsewhere for 8 Minutes =

Studio album by Something for Kate
- Released: 4 July 1997
- Recorded: February 1997 at York St Studios, Auckland, New Zealand
- Genre: Alternative rock
- Length: 57:39
- Label: Murmur
- Producer: Brian Paulson

Something for Kate chronology
....The Answer to Both Your Questions (1996)	Elsewhere for 8 Minutes (1997)	Beautiful Sharks (1999)

Singles from Elsewhere for 8 Minutes
- 1. "Captain (Million Miles An Hour)" Released: August 1997; 2. "Prick" Released: October 1997; 3. "Working Against Me" Released: February 1998; 4. "Roll Credit" Released: June 1998

Elsewhere for 8 Minutes is the debut studio album by Australian band Something for Kate. It was released in 1997 on Murmur. The title is a reference to the time it takes light travelling from the Sun to reach Earth. The band recorded the album at York St Studios in Auckland, New Zealand with producer Brian Paulson, whose previous credits included Wilco, Slint and Son Volt. Frontman Paul Dempsey said the band chose to record overseas to avoid being interrupted. "And it was cost-effective as well," he said. "The Australian dollar was better, the studio was fantastic–it just all worked out. And we didn't want to be in Melbourne." Bassist Julian Carroll, who had already decided to leave the band, remained for the recording but left soon after its completion.

== Track listing ==
=== CD ===
1. "Anarchitect" – 3:50
2. "Pinstripe" – 6:10
3. "Captain (Million Miles an Hour)" – 4:42
4. "Paintbrushes" – 4:48
5. "Prick" – 3:37
6. "Glass Timing" – 4:28
7. "Soundczech" – 6:12
8. "Working Against Me" – 4:41
9. "Strategy" – 5:57
10. "Roll Credit" – 4:13
11. "Like Bankrobbers" – 5:26
12. "The Last Minute" – 3:35

=== Vinyl ===
==== Side A ====
1. "Anarchitect" – 3:50
2. "Pinstripe" – 6:10
3. "Captain (Million Miles an Hour)" – 4:42
4. "Paintbrushes" – 4:48
5. "Prick" – 3:37
6. "Roll Credit" – 4:13

==== Side B ====
1. "Soundczech" – 6:12
2. "Working Against Me" – 4:41
3. "Strategy" – 5:57
4. "Like Bankrobbers" – 5:26
5. "The Last Minute" – 3:35

=== Deluxe edition bonus disc ===
The 2014 deluxe edition included a bonus disc of all the albums B-Sides.

==== Track listing ====
1. "Subjected to Change" – 5:11
2. "Floatation" – 4:32
3. "Chapel Street Etc" – 4:34
4. "All the Things That Aren't Good About Scientology" – 3:58
5. "Telescope" – 6:38
6. "The Last Minute - Djinji Brown Remix" – 3:39
7. "Prickly - Eli Janney Remix" – 4:37
8. "3x2" – 6:41
9. "Friendly" – 3:50
10. "Clint" – 5:19
11. "Harpoon (Jebediah Cover)" – 4:20
12. "You Can't Please Everybody, Rockwell" – 4:48
13. "Just a Passenger" – 5:02

== Personnel ==
Something for Kate

- Paul Dempsey – guitar, keyboards, vocals
- Julian Carroll – bass guitar
- Clint Hyndman – drums

Additional personnel

- Claudia Price – cello
- Rodd Bamman – viola
- Miranda Adams – violin
- Jocelyn Healy – violin
- Stephen Small – piano/piano accordion
- Strings arranged by Stephen Small

== Charts ==
Chart performance for Elsewhere for 8 Minutes
Chart (1997)	Peak position
Australian Albums (ARIA)	70

== Certifications ==
Region	Certification	Certified units/sales
Australia (ARIA)	Gold	35,000^{‡}
^{‡} Sales+streaming figures based on certification alone.

== Release history ==
Region	Date	Format	Edition(s)	Label	Catalogue
Australia	July 1997	CD; Cassette; LP	Standard	Murmur	MATTCD053
Australia	July 2014	2×CD; LP	Deluxe Edition, Reissue	Murmur, Sony Music Australia	88843074841
Australia	22 August 2022	LP	25th Anniversary Reissue	Sony Music Australia	19658737561
