= Song for a Sleepwalker =

Single by Something for Kate

from the album The Official Fiction
- Released: 10 October 2003
- Genre: Indie rock
- Songwriters: Paul Dempsey; Stephanie Ashworth; Clint Hyndman

Something for Kate singles chronology
"Déjà Vu" (2003)	"Song for a Sleepwalker" (2003)	"Moving Right Along" (2004)

"Song for a Sleepwalker" was the second single to be released from the album The Official Fiction by the Australian rock group Something for Kate. It was ranked #63 on Triple J Hottest 100, 2003.

== Track listings ==
Australian CD

1. "Song for a Sleepwalker" (Album Version)
2. "Moving Right Along" (Alternate Version)
3. "Anchormann II"
4. "Faster"

== Charts ==
Chart (2003)	Peak position
Australia (ARIA)	35
