= Leave Your Soul to Science =

Studio album by Something for Kate
- Released: 28 September 2012
- Recorded: Elmwood Recording, Dallas, Texas
- Genre: Alternative rock
- Length: 46:41
- Labels: EMI, Capitol
- Producer: John Congleton

Something for Kate chronology
Live at the Corner (2008)	Leave Your Soul to Science (2012)	The Modern Medieval (2020)

Singles from Leave Your Soul to Science
- 1. "Survival Expert" Released: 2012; 2. "Miracle Cure" Released: December 2012; 3. "Star-crossed Citizens" Released: 2013

Professional ratings
Review scores
Source	Rating
The Age	4/5 stars
Sunday Herald Sun	4/5 stars

Leave Your Soul to Science is the sixth studio album by Melbourne band Something for Kate, released on 28 September 2012. The album debuted at No.5 on the ARIA Charts. The album was produced by John Congleton, whose previous credits include Okkervil River, Shearwater and The New Pornographers and recorded at his Elmwood studio in Dallas, Texas. Frontman Paul Dempsey told The Age the band had been looking for someone to tell them when enough was enough. "We recognised an inclination or proclivity among ourselves to procrastinate and keep layering stuff up," he said. "We knew that we needed to fight that instinct and he was very much the guy to help us."

He told the Hobart Mercury Congleton was "the perfect guy for our new-found relaxed attitude": "He's a real experimenter and we were feeling very experimental ourselves. The four of us would just sit around and throw out ideas, and do the strangest, dumbest things and see what worked. Whenever we thought something was weird and interesting but we weren't sure about it, we'd just run with it any sort of uncertainty was a good thing. We ran with the uncertainty and embraced the feeling of not being 100 per cent sure of everything we were doing."

Dempsey said he had been unsatisfied with the way some songs on previous albums had been captured.

"In previous years we were concerned with being perfectionists, and trying to make everything just so. What we realised after a long time is that that actually can end up sucking the life out of things, and that perhaps the better way to do things is to fly by the seat of your pants and rely on the spontaneous energy of the moment. Some of our past records have suffered a bit from too much nitpicking, and this latest record really has zero nitpicking. There's plenty of audible mistakes and weird moments where we just went fuck it, just leave it, it's all part of what happens when you hit record."

Dempsey said the album's lyrics contained an abundance of often cryptic black humour. He said he found the lyrics of "This Economy", a song of lost love set during the 2008 financial crisis, "hilariously funny". "The song reeks of (disgraced businessman) Bernie Madoff and it reeks of young Wall Street executives who equate the size of their wallets with the success of their human relationships," he said. Dempsey said he was not bothered if people misunderstood his lyrics. "If my humour doesn't translate, there shouldn't need to be a press release letting everyone know that I'm funny."

The album's cover and inner book photography was by bassist Stephanie Ashworth.

== Track listing ==
(All songs by Something For Kate)

1. "Star-Crossed Citizens" – 3:41
2. "Survival Expert" – 3:16
3. "Private Rain" – 5:00
4. "The Kids Will Get the Money" – 4:52
5. "Sooner Or Later You're Gonna Have to Do Something About Me" – 3:25
6. "Miracle Cure" – 3:21
7. "Deep Sea Divers" – 3:51
8. "This Economy" – 3:46
9. "Back to Normal" – 3:55
10. "The Fireball at the End of Everything" – 4:53
11. "Eureka" – 3:22
12. "Begin" – 3:18

=== Bonus disc, Shotgun Karaoke ===
1. "Survival Expert (acoustic) – 3:20
2. "Hanging On" (Active Child) – 3:49
3. "Let's Dance" (David Bowie) – 3:45
4. "Ship of Fools" (Karl Wallinger) – 4:18
5. "Stop" (Sam Brown, Bruce Brody, Gregg Sutton) – 4:27

== Charts ==
Chart (2012)	Peak position
Australian Albums (ARIA)	5

== Personnel ==
Something for Kate

- Paul Dempsey – guitar, vocals
- Clint Hyndman – drums, percussion, backing vocals
- Stephanie Ashworth – bass guitar, backing vocals

Additional personnel

- Sarah Jaffe – backing vocals ("Deep Sea Divers")
- Bobby Sparks – keyboards ("The Kids Will get the Money", "The Fireball at the End of Everything", "Eureka", "Begin")

== Release history ==
Region	Date	Format	Edition(s)	Label	Catalogue
Australia	28 September 2012	CD; LP; Digital	Standard	EMI Music / Capitol Records	4042422 4
Australia	28 September 2012	2×CD	Special Edition	EMI Music / Capitol Records	4042392 0
Australia	July 2014	2×CD	Deluxe Edition, Reissue	EMI Music / Capitol Records	3791973
Australia	August 2018	LP	Limited Edition, Reissue	EMI Music / Capitol Records	4042431
