= The Official Fiction =

Studio album by Something for Kate
- Released: 15 August 2003
- Recorded: Mangrove Studios, Somersby, NSW
- Genre: Alternative rock
- Length: 53:48
- Label: Murmur
- Producer: Trina Shoemaker, Something for Kate

Something for Kate chronology
Echolalia (2001)	The Official Fiction (2003)	Phantom Limbs: Selected B-Sides (2004)

Singles from The Official Fiction
- 1. "Déjà Vu" Released: July 2003; 2. "Song for a Sleepwalker" Released: October 2003; 3. "Moving Right Along" Released: April 2004

The Official Fiction was the fourth studio album by Australian band Something for Kate. The album debuted at Number 1 on the ARIA charts and earned platinum status for sales exceeding 70,000 units. It earned the band four ARIA Music Award nominations (Album of the Year, Best Rock Album, Best Group, Best Cover Art) and took out Rolling Stone's Album of the Year and Single of the Year for "Déjà Vu". The first single from the album, "Déjà Vu", remains a staple of their live sets. It was followed by two other singles, "Song for a Sleepwalker" and "Moving Right Along".

== Track listing ==
(All songs by Something for Kate except where noted)

1. "Max Planck" – 4:41
2. "Best Weapon" – 4:47
3. "Song for a Sleepwalker" – 3:54
4. "Kaplan/Thornhill" – 4:44
5. "Light at the End of the Tunnel" – 3:36
6. "Letter to the Editor" – 3:31
7. "Déjà Vu" – 4:26
8. "Reverse Soundtrack" – 4:41
9. "Coldwater Canyon" – 4:23
10. "Souvenir" – 3:24
11. "Moving Right Along" – 3:27
12. "Asleep at the Wheel" – 3:56
13. "No Man's Land" – 4:17

=== Deluxe edition bonus disc ===
The 2014 deluxe edition included a bonus disc of the album's B-sides.

==== Track listing ====
1. "Losing My Mind" – 4:55
2. "Blueprint Architecture" – 3:30
3. "You Only Hide (Live Acoustic version)" – 4:16
4. "Moving Right Along – Alternate version" – 3:22
5. "Anchorman II" – 4:50
6. "Faster" – 5:41
7. "Life of the Party" – 5:40
8. "Ashes to Ashes" (Live at the POW) (David Bowie) – 4:36
9. "Hanging on the Telephone" (Jack Lee) – 2:38

== Personnel ==
Something for Kate

- Paul Dempsey – guitars, vocals
- Stephanie Ashworth – bass
- Clint Hyndman – drums

Additional personnel

- Grant-Lee Phillips – backing vocals ("No Man's Land")
- Caitlin Cary – backing vocals ("Song for a Sleepwalker")
- Lisa Germano – backing vocals ("Light at the End of the Tunnel", "Reverse Soundtrack")
- Kathryn Brownhill – violin ("Song for a Sleepwalker", "Reverse Soundtrack", "Coldwater Canyon", "Souvenir")
- Catherine Tabrett – cello ("Light at the End of the Tunnel", "Reverse Soundtrack", "Coldwater Canyon")
- The Section Quartet ("Kaplan/Thornhill", "Deja Vu"):
  - Eric Gorfain – violin
  - Daphne Chan – violin
  - Richard Dodd – cello
  - Leah Katz – viola

== Charts ==
Chart (2003)	Peak position
Australian Albums (ARIA)	1

== Certifications ==
Region	Certification	Certified units/sales
Australia (ARIA)	Platinum	70,000^{‡}
^{‡} Sales+streaming figures based on certification alone.

== Release history ==
Region	Date	Format	Edition(s)	Label	Catalogue
Australia	August 2003	CD; LP; Digital	Standard	Murmur	MATTCD130
Europe	2004	CD	Standard	Murmur / Epic	EPC 515344 2
Australia	July 2014	2×CD; LP	Deluxe Edition, Reissue	Murmur, Sony Music Australia	88843074352
Australia	August 2018	LP	Limited Edition, Reissue	Sony Music Australia	88843074871
