= Diamonds On the Inside =

Studio album by Ben Harper
- Released: March 11, 2003
- Recorded: 2002
- Genres: Blues rock; reggae; funk rock; jam band
- Length: 61:29
- Label: Virgin
- Producer: Ben Harper

Ben Harper chronology
Live from Mars (2001)	Diamonds On the Inside (2003)	There Will Be a Light (2004)

Singles from Diamonds On the Inside
- 1. "With My Own Two Hands" Released: 2002; 2. "Diamonds On the Inside" Released: April 21, 2003

Professional ratings
Review scores
Source	Rating
AllMusic	4/5 stars
Pitchfork	6.5/10

Diamonds On the Inside is the fifth album by American singer-songwriter Ben Harper, released in 2003. Although he did not explicitly credit the Innocent Criminals for the first time in 10 years, all the touring members continue to support him on the album. On this album, Harper brought on several new additions to his band, the first being guitarist Nicky Panicci (a.k.a. Nicky P) in 2002 who is the first guitar player to be credited on a Ben Harper record. Panicci toured with Harper on the Diamonds on the Inside Tour for almost a year. After leaving Harper's band on his own accord, Marc Ford, formerly of The Black Crowes replaced Panicci and joined Harper's band.

== Track listing ==
All songs written by Ben Harper except as noted.

1. "With My Own Two Hands" – 4:35
2. "When It's Good" – 3:03
3. "Diamonds On the Inside" – 4:27
4. "Touch from Your Lust" – 4:28
5. "When She Believes" – 5:20
6. "Brown Eyed Blues" (Harper, Juan D. Nelson) – 5:42
7. "Bring the Funk" (Harper, Oliver Charles, Greg Kurstin, Leon Mobley, Nelson) – 4:07
8. "Everything" – 3:04
9. "Amen Omen" – 5:51
10. "Temporary Remedy" – 3:11
11. "So High So Low" – 3:44
12. "Blessed to Be a Witness" – 4:11
13. "Picture of Jesus" – 5:49
14. "She's Only Happy in the Sun" (Dean Butterworth, Harper) – 3:57

== Personnel ==
=== Musicians ===
- Ben Harper – organ, acoustic guitar, bass guitar, drums, electric guitar, vocals, synthesiser bass, tongue drum
- Al Yasha Anderson – guitar solo on "With My Own Two Hands"
- Carla Benson – background vocals
- Ron Blake – trumpet
- Leo Chelyapov – clarinet
- John Ingram – background vocals
- Greg Kurstin – synthesizer, piano, celeste, Hammond organ, electric piano, background vocals, clavinet, mellotron
- Ladysmith Black Mambazo – vocals
- Greg Leisz – pedal steel
- Timothy Loo – cello
- Misty Love – background vocals
- Leon Mobley – percussion, sound effects, background vocals
- Juan Nelson – bass, background vocals
- Nicky Panicci (a.k.a. Nicky P.) – acoustic guitar, guitar, electric guitar
- David Ralicke – trombone
- Darrel Sims – viola
- Amy Wilkins – harp
- Rebecca Yeh – cello
- Josef Zimmerman – upright bass

=== Production ===
- Producer: Ben Harper
- Engineers: Todd Burke, Rick "Soldier" Will
- Assistant engineers: Kevin Dean, June Murakawa
- Mixing: Todd Burke
- Mastering: Gavin Lurssen
- Arrangers: Ben Harper, Greg Kurstin
- Assistants: Josh Florian, Rail Jon Rogut
- Advisor: Ben Elder
- Design: Mike King
- Layout Design: Mike King
- Photography: Bunni Lezak, Warren Darius Aftahi, Blue Sky, Jon Shapiro
- Research: Ben Elder

== Charts ==
=== Weekly charts ===
Weekly chart performance for Diamonds On the Inside
Chart (2003)	Peak position
Australian Albums (ARIA)	2
Austrian Albums (Ö3 Austria)	64
Belgian Albums (Ultratop Flanders)	29
Belgian Albums (Ultratop Wallonia)	8
Canadian Albums (Billboard)	8
French Albums (SNEP)	2
German Albums (Offizielle Top 100)	73
Italian Albums (FIMI)	1
New Zealand Albums (RMNZ)	2
Portuguese Albums (AFP)	10
Swiss Albums (Schweizer Hitparade)	3
US Billboard 200	19

=== Year-end charts ===
2003 year-end chart performance for Diamonds On the Inside
Chart (2003)	Position
Australian Albums (ARIA)	17
Belgian Albums (Ultratop Wallonia)	66
French Albums (SNEP)	23
New Zealand Albums (RMNZ)	8
Swiss Albums (Schweizer Hitparade)	60

2004 year-end chart performance for Diamonds On the Inside
Chart (2004)	Position
French Albums (SNEP)	155

== Certifications ==
Certifications for Diamonds On the Inside
Region	Certification	Certified units/sales
Australia (ARIA)	2× Platinum	140,000^{^}
Canada (Music Canada)	Gold	50,000^{^}
France (SNEP)	Platinum	300,000^{*}
Italy (FIMI)	Platinum	100,000^{*}
New Zealand (RMNZ)	2× Platinum	30,000^{^}
Portugal (AFP)	Silver	10,000^{^}
Switzerland (IFPI Switzerland)	Gold	20,000^{^}
United States (RIAA)	Gold	500,000^{‡}
^{*} Sales figures based on certification alone.^{^} Shipments figures based on certification alone.^{‡} Sales+streaming figures based on certification alone.
