= Déjà Vu (Something for Kate song) =

Single by Something for Kate

from the album The Official Fiction
- B-side: "Losing My Mind", "Blueprint Architecture"
- Released: 4 July 2003
- Genre: Indie rock
- Label: Murmur
- Songwriter(s): Clint Hyndman, Paul Dempsey, Stephanie Ashworth

Something for Kate singles chronology
"Say Something" (2002)	"Déjà Vu" (2003)	"Song for a Sleepwalker" (2003)

Déjà Vu is a song by Australian indie rock group, Something for Kate. It was issued in July 2003 as the lead single ahead of their fourth studio album, The Official Fiction (August 2003), and peaked at No. 19 on the ARIA Singles Charts. It became part of the band's live set.

== Music video ==
A music video directed by Grant Marshall was produced to promote the single.

== Track listings ==
Australian CD

1. "Déjà Vu" (Radio Edit)
2. "Losing My Mind"
3. "Blueprint Architecture"
4. "You Only Hide" (Live Acoustic)

== Charts ==
Chart (2003)	Peak position
Australia (ARIA)	19
