= With My Own Two Hands =

Single by Ben Harper

from the album Diamonds On the Inside
- Released: 2002
- Recorded: 2002
- Genre: Reggae, blues rock
- Length: 4:34
- Label: Virgin
- Songwriter: Ben Harper
- Producer: Ben Harper

Ben Harper singles chronology
"Steal My Kisses" (2000)	"With My Own Two Hands" (2002)	"Diamonds On the Inside" (2003)

"With My Own Two Hands" is a single from Ben Harper's 2003 release Diamonds on the Inside.

The lyrics focus on how changes in the world can come about when a single person decides to take action. The song, which features an up-tempo reggae groove, was played in regular rotation on European radio stations. The song's popularity in Europe was such that Ben Harper was awarded French Rolling Stone's "Artist of the Year" ("Artiste de l'année") in 2003. An alternate version featuring Jack Johnson is also featured on the Curious George film soundtrack Sing-A-Longs and Lullabies for the Film Curious George.

The B-side to the single was "Bring the Funk", also taken from Diamonds on the Inside. It has been included on some TV programs as background music.
