= Corner Hotel =

Pub and music venue in Melbourne, Australia

The Corner Hotel
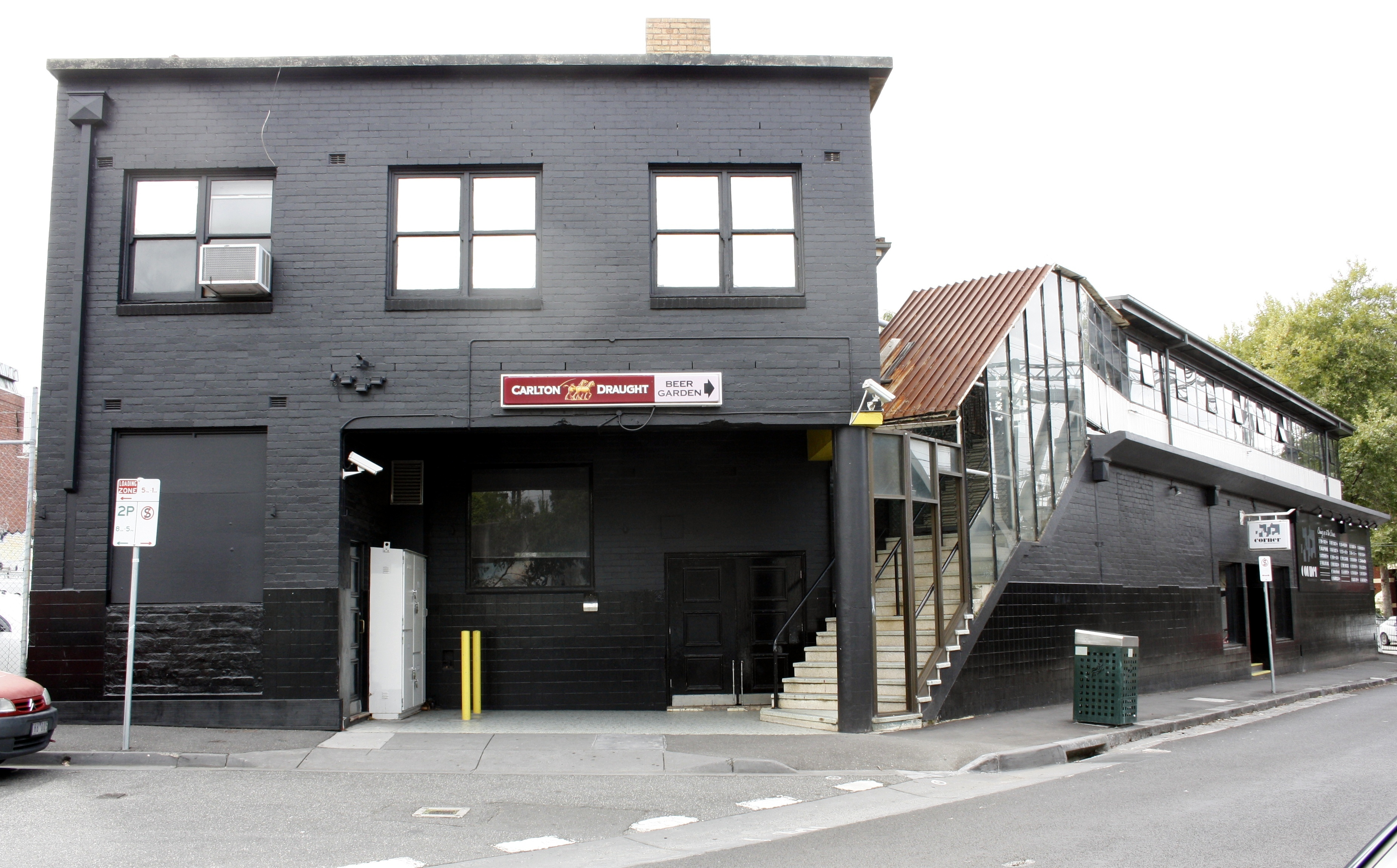
- Interactive map of the The Corner Hotel area

General information
- Location: 57 Swan Street, Richmond, Victoria
- Coordinates: 37°49′29″S 144°59′33″E
- Opened: 1871

The Corner Hotel in the Melbourne suburb of Richmond, Victoria, Australia, is a remodelled 19th-century pub which has been a live music venue since the 1940s and, since 1995, a popular rock music venue and rooftop bar.

== History ==
=== 1871–1983 ===
In 1871, the premises was licensed to David and Jane McCormick. Business thrived because of the close proximity to the Richmond railway station. In 1881, it was renovated by William Malone, who improved both the accommodation and the liquor quality. Malone was the licensee until 1895. Between 1895 and 1929, the hotel changed hands seven times. From 1929 to 1935, it was operated by Nelly O'Connor and her husband.

The pub is thought to have begun presenting live music during the 1940s jazz era. During the 1950s, it was owned by the Melbourne Cooperative Brewing Company, an offshoot of Carlton & United Breweries. They rebuilt the hotel in 1954, obtaining permits to serve alcohol during the reconstruction. This was the peak time of an Australian custom known as the six o'clock swill, where venues were required to stop serving alcohol at 6 p.m. This law was a relic of World War I and operated from 1915 until its abolition in the mid-1960s (1966 in Victoria). It meant that workers would rush to pubs after finishing work and consume as much alcohol as possible before the bar closed.

In 1966, the pub was demolished and rebuilt in a slightly shifted location, to make space for the widening of the railway lines.

=== 1984–1995 ===
Brian Hartung from Carlton & United Breweries approached Wayne Gale in 1984 and asked if he could start music at The Corner Hotel. At that time, Gale was running venues at The John Barleycorn Hotel in Collingwood, The Tiger Lounge (Royal Oak in Richmond), and The Prospect Hill Hotel in Kew.

The first bands to play the venue were The Adventure and Big Music Works on Friday 28 February 1983 with Big Pig following on the Saturday night. At first, live music was played only on Friday and Saturday nights. The first band to hold a Saturday night residency was the Spaniards, which was fronted by Australian music legend Mick Pealing. During the period that Wayne Gale was the owner and band booker, the cream of Australia's music industry played there. At one point, he achieved 15 full houses in 16 days and the missing day was a break to allow the staff to recover. This was an outstanding achievement considering the strength and fierce competition in the Melbourne music industry at the time.

Bands such as Johnny Diesel & The Injectors, Spy vs Spy, and Baby Animals all used the venue to build their profile in Melbourne and achieved this by playing on rotating monthly residency. Both Mick Jagger and David Gilmour performed separate, unannounced shows during 1988. Pink Floyd first played at Corner on a Monday night with the resident band the Party Animals, and they had so much fun they returned to play as the whole band the following Friday night. During this time, the Corner Hotel played host to many music industry master classes and at one class by Liberty De Vito (drummer for Billy Joel) to everyone's surprise Billy Joel jumped up and sang.

The Corner Hotel also played host to many overseas bands such as Ian Gillan, Spencer Davis, Canned Heat, The Fabulous Thunderbirds, Lonnie Brooks, Charlie Musselwhite, and Junior Wells. The majority of major Australian acts played during this period, and some of the names were Ian Moss, Don Walker, Jimmy Barnes, Tommy Emmanuel, Painters and Dockers, TISM, Joe Camilleri, Nick Barker, Screaming Jets, Kevin Borich, Stevie Wright, Masters Apprentices, Weddings Parties Anything. Other bands such as The Saints, The Stems and Ups & Downs also played the venue during this time. During the time Wayne Gale was the owner, The Corner Hotel became known as the place to see Melbourne's up-and-coming bands.

=== 1996–present ===
Owners Tim Northeast & Mathew Everett took the reins of the Corner in the mid-1990s. Everett owned the Punters Club in Fitzroy, also a popular live music venue at the time, and currently owns the Northcote Social Club in the eponymous suburb.

The Corner has also played host to a number of significant moments in music history. The White Stripes created the iconic riff to Seven Nation Army during their soundcheck in 2003, which coincidentally is 700m from AAMI Park where it is played after local soccer club Melbourne Victory play their song after a goal is scored. In 2006 U2 filmed a video for their single Window in the Skies in the band room and rooftop garden of the hotel. Crowded House chose the venue for their final Melbourne show in 1996, though they later reformed. The Living End used footage from their 1997 Corner show for the film clip to Second Solution.

The venue was one of the first in 2005 to make all shows smoke-free and has also been stamping out sexual assault and harassment, and unspecified environmental initiatives.

The Corner Hotel launched the Corner Award in 2016, an annual award for local artists. Previous recipients of the Award include Sampa The Great, Cable Ties and Baker Boy.

The Corner has received a number of accolades over the years including Music Victoria Best Venue 2013–2018, NLMAs Victoria Venue of the Year 2016, and AHA National Awards for Excellence – Best Entertainment Venue 2019, AHA VIC State Awards for Excellence – Best Live Entertainment Venue 2017 & 2018. It has also held its place as the top Australian venue in the Pollstar Top 100 Global Club Venues since 2013, the highest placement being #13.

Artists that have played the Corner include:

Airbourne, Alison Wonderland, Amity Affliction, Amy Shark, Architecture in Helsinki, Band of Horses, Ben Harper, Biffy Clyro, Big Scary, Birds of Tokyo, Black Lips, Black Rebel Motorcycle Club, Blindside, Blink-182, Bliss n Eso, Bowling For Soup, Boy & Bear, Cat Power, Charles Bradley, COG, Courtney Barnett, Crowded House, David Hasselhoff, Deftones, Diesel, Derrick May, Dinosaur Jr., Diplo, Dropkick Murphys, Easy Star All-Stars, First Aid Kit, Flight Facilities, Frente, Future of the Left, Grimes, Grizzly Bear, Hilltop Hoods, Hot Water Music, Hozier, Interpol, Jebediah, Jesse Welles, Jimmy Cliff, Joan Jett, Joe Strummer, John Butler Trio, King Krule, Lorde, Magic Dirt, Me First and the Gimme Gimmes, Midnight Oil, Ministry, Morcheeba, Mr. Bungle, Mutemath, Northeast Party House, Northlane, Nothing but Thieves, Opeth, Paul Kelly, Peaches, Pennywise, Pinch Points, Public Enemy, Queens of the Stone Age, Rocket from the Crypt, Rodriguez, Rowland S. Howard, Sam Fender, Sharon Jones, Shella, Shlomo, SIA, Silversun Pickups, Something for Kate, Spiderbait, Spoon, Steve Earle, Swans, Tallest Man on Earth, Tame Impala, Tash Sultana, Tex Perkins, The Avalanches, The Black Keys, Michelle Shocked, The Bronx, The Darkness, The Drones, The Hives, The Horrors, The Libertines, The Living End, The Misfits, The Rapture, The White Stripes, Trophy Eyes, Vance Joy, Vengaboys, Violent Femmes, Wanda Jackson, Weddings Parties Anything, Xavier Rudd, Yellowcard,You Am I.

== Awards ==
=== Music Victoria Awards ===
The Music Victoria Awards are an annual awards night celebrating Victorian music. They commenced in 2006 (formerly known as The Age EG Awards).

Year	Nominee / work	Award	Result	Ref.
Music Victoria Awards of 2013	Corner Hotel	Best Venue	Won	
Music Victoria Awards of 2014	Corner Hotel	Best Venue	Won	
Music Victoria Awards of 2015	Corner Hotel	Best Venue	Won	
Music Victoria Awards of 2016	Corner Hotel	Best Venue (Over 500 Capacity)	Won	
Music Victoria Awards of 2017	Corner Hotel	Best Venue (Over 500 Capacity)	Won	
Music Victoria Awards of 2018	Corner Hotel	Best Venue (Over 500 Capacity)	Won	
Music Victoria Awards of 2019	Corner Hotel	Best Venue (Over 500 Capacity)	Nominated	
Music Victoria Awards of 2020	Corner Hotel	Best Venue (Over 500 Capacity)	Nominated	
2021 Music Victoria Awards	Corner Hotel	Best Venue (Over 500 Capacity)	Nominated	
2023 Music Victoria Awards	Corner Hotel	Best Large Venue (Metro)	Nominated	
2024 Music Victoria Awards	Corner Hotel	Best Large Venue (Metro)	Won	
