= ....The Answer to Both Your Questions =

EP by Something for Kate
- Released: 1996
- Recorded: January 1996
- Genre: Alternative rock
- Length: 29:43
- Language: English
- Label: Murmur

Something for Kate chronology
....The Answer to Both Your Questions (1996)	Elsewhere for 8 Minutes (1997)

....The Answer to Both Your Questions is a 1996 debut EP by Something for Kate. The EP reportedly title came from the bands' frontman Paul Dempsey asking a friend for suggestions for what to name the EP. His response was, "The answer to both your questions is 'Porn'". Although Dempsey did not take this advice, he thought the answer was "a good title".

== Track listing ==
All tracks are written by Something for Kate.

No.	Title	Length
1.	"Subject To Change"	3:22
2.	"Higher Than You Think"	6:04
3.	"Tomorrow And The Next Day"	4:00
4.	"Picards Lament"	3:28
5.	"Slow"	4:27
6.	"Toothpaste"	3:09
7.	"Clint"	5:18

== Personnel ==
- Julian Carroll – bass guitar
- Clint Hyndman – drums
- Paul Dempsey – vocals, guitar
- Sophie Wheeler – cello
- Recorded – Greg Atkinson, Lawrence Maddy, Tamas Spencer
- Mixed – Greg Atkinson
- Mastered – Wayne Baptist
