= Diamonds On the Inside (song) =

2003 single by Ben Harper

Single by Ben Harper

from the album Diamonds On the Inside
- Released: April 28, 2003
- Length: 4:26
- Label: Virgin
- Songwriter: Ben Harper
- Producer: Ben Harper

Ben Harper singles chronology
"With My Own Two Hands" (2002)	"Diamonds On the Inside" (2003)	"Better Way" (2006)

"Diamonds On the Inside" is a song by American artist Ben Harper. It was released in April 2003 as the second single from his album, Diamonds On the Inside.

== Lyrical content ==
The verse "A candle throws its light into the darkness In a nasty world so shines a good deed" demonstrates the importance of Shakespeare in Harper's references; it comes from the famous play The Merchant of Venice: "How far that little candle throws his beams! So shines a good deed in a naughty world."

== Charts ==
=== Weekly charts ===
Chart (2003)	Peak position
Australia (ARIA)	68
France (SNEP)	85
New Zealand (Recorded Music NZ)	13
US Adult Pop Airplay (Billboard)	31
US Adult Alternative Airplay (Billboard)	2

=== Year-end charts ===
Chart (2003)	Position
US Triple-A (Billboard)	14

== Release history ==
Region	Date	Format(s)	Label(s)	Ref.
Australia	April 28, 2003	CD	Virgin	
United States	July 28, 2003	Triple A radio	Virgin	
