= The Modern Medieval =

Studio album by Something for Kate
- Released: 20 November 2020
- Studios: La Cueva Recording, Byron Bay, Australia
- Length: 39:26
- Label: EMI
- Producers: Nick DiDia; Something for Kate

Something for Kate chronology
| Leave Your Soul to Science (2012) | The Modern Medieval (2020) |

Singles from The Modern Medieval
- 1. "Situation Room" Released: 2 April 2020; 2. "Waste Our Breath" Released: 17 July 2020; 3. "Supercomputer" Released: 4 September 2020; 4. "Come Back Before I Come Back to My Senses" Released: 2 October 2020; 5. "Blue Bird" Released: 19 March 2021

The Modern Medieval is the seventh studio album by Melbourne band Something for Kate, released on 20 November 2020.

== Background and recording ==
The songwriting process for The Modern Medieval began almost immediately after Dempsey released Strange Loop in 2016 and by the end of 2017, the musical side of things was relatively established. With a sense of where things were going, the trio entered La Cueva Recording with studio co-owner Nick DiDia to formally begin work on the record. Once the recording process had finished, the trio allowed the record to settle before embarking on the mixing process with Howie Beck in Canada.

Paul Dempsey told Rolling Stone "All our other records have been recorded in the same studio, with the same person. You start recording, and immediately as soon as you finish recording, you start mixing, and you keep on going until it's done, and then it's all finished. We decided this time, before we even started, that we wanted to break it up into segments. We wanted to record it one place with one person, and then go home for a month, live with the rough recording, and then go somewhere else and mix it with somewhere else again. So it was three blocks, and it almost gave us three opportunities to imagine what the record could be."

The recording and mixing process was officially wrapped up in November 2019. The album was scheduled for mid-2020, but was delayed due to the COVID-19 pandemic.

== Critical reception ==
Professional ratings
Review scores
| Source | Rating |
|---|---|
| Beat Magazine | 9/10 stars |

The Modern Medieval received critical acclaim.

Jeff Jenkins from Stack Magazine said "Paul Dempsey knows how to craft a multi-layered masterpiece. His songs are beautifully constructed soundscapes" calling the album "a fine return".

Mary Gleeko from Beat Magazine wrote: "The Modern Medieval is an album of ten polished and slick tracks that dance with spirit and ferocious intensity."

== Track listing ==
1. "All the Great Minds" – 4:08
2. "Come Back Before I Come Back to My Senses" – 3:33
3. "Situation Room" – 4:30
4. "Inside Job" – 4:04
5. "Supercomputer" – 4:00
6. "Waste Our Breath" – 4:01
7. "Our Extinguished Colleague" – 3:06
8. "Bluebird" – 3:51
9. "Last Resort Town" – 2:52
10. "I Will Defeat You" – 5:21

== Charts ==
Chart performance for The Modern Medieval
| Chart (2020) | Peak position |
|---|---|
| Australian Albums (ARIA) | 4 |

== Release history ==
| Region | Date | Format | Edition(s) | Label | Catalogue |
|---|---|---|---|---|---|
| Australia | 20 November 2020 | CD; LP; Digital | Standard | EMI Music | 0710368 / 0875192 |
