= Something for Kate =

Australian alternative rock band

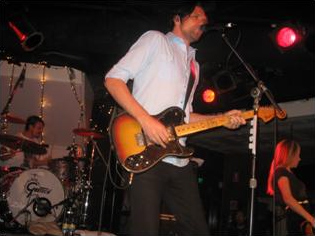
- L to R: Clint Hyndman, Paul Dempsey, Stephanie Ashworth performing at the Corner Hotel, Richmond in February 2008

Background information
- Origin: Melbourne, Victoria, Australia
- Genres: Alternative rock, post-grunge
- Years active: 1994–present
- Labels: Murmur/Sony BMG; New Found Frequency; EMI
- Spinoffs: Scared of Horses
- Members: Paul Dempsey; Clint Hyndman; Stephanie Ashworth
- Past members: Julian Carroll; Toby Ralph
- Website: somethingforkate.com

Something for Kate are an Australian alternative rock band, which formed in 1994 with Paul Dempsey on lead vocals and guitar, and Clint Hyndman on drums. They were joined in 1998 by Stephanie Ashworth on bass guitar and backing vocals. The group have released seven studio albums: both The Official Fiction (2003) and Desert Lights (2006) topped the ARIA Albums Chart; while Beautiful Sharks (1999), Echolalia (2001) and Leave Your Soul to Science (2012) reached the top 10. Two of their singles have reached the ARIA top 20: "Monsters" (2001) and "Déjà Vu" (2003). The band have received a total of 11 nominations for ARIA Music Awards in 1999, 2001 and 2003.

== History ==
=== 1994–1997: Formation and early years ===
Something for Kate were formed in 1994 in Melbourne by Julian Carroll on bass guitar, Paul Dempsey on lead guitar and lead vocals, and Clint Hyndman on drums. Dempsey and Hyndman were school friends from Padua College, Mornington Peninsula; Carroll successfully answered their advertisement in music stores. The trio played their first gig on 12 September 1994 at the Punter's Club in Melbourne, changing their band name from Fish of the Day at the suggestion of the venue's booking agent, Richard Moffat. Dempsey recalled that they performed because they "just wanted to make an abrasive, staccato racket, like electrical machinery." He explained that the group's new name was inspired by his dog, Kate – he had been left a shopping note, to buy "Something for Kate". As for the dog, Dempsey's mother sold Kate, the family's Jack Russell, "They told me she ran away... I think they were a bit tired of her escaping out of the back fence. My mum let it slip about a year later. She let the dog out of the bag."

The band built a varied fan base in Melbourne and recorded a demo tape that sold out of multiple pressings. In 1995, Sony Music's A&R, Chris Dunn, signed them to the Murmur label, which had picked up teenage rock band Silverchair a year earlier. He said one song, "Slow", was particularly appealing: "That really triggered the whole thing in me. I kept on playing this song over and over again. I just thought it was a really good song for such a young person."

Something for Kate released a seven-track extended play, ....The Answer to Both Your Questions, in May 1996. It was produced by Greg Atkinson and appeared both on CD and as a hand-decorated mini-LP. An Oz Music Project reviewer described it as "a critically acclaimed debut release and started catching the ears of punters around the country." During August and September of that year, they undertook the Unipaloser Tour of national universities with label mates Jebediah and Bluebottle Kiss.

In October they followed with a single, "Dean Martin", also produced by Atkinson, which received frequent airplay on youth radio network, Triple J. A limited edition five-track EP, Intermission, was hastily assembled from leftover recordings and released in March 1997, quickly becoming a collector's item. Jasper Lee of Oz Music Project declared that it "shows the vast potential for [the] Melbourne band... Dempsey's voice proves that under the thick layer of the morbid rock guy, that a emotionally-brittle heart lies within."

In February 1997, the band recorded their debut album, Elsewhere for 8 Minutes (July 1997), at York St Studios, Auckland, with producer Brian Paulson, whose credits included Wilco and Slint. Carroll, who had recently married, quit the band to live on a rural property, but agreed to remain for the sessions, he was replaced on bass guitar by Toby Ralph (ex-Lobtailing). Greg Lawrence of WHAMMO website described the album as "the glorious debut" which "showed, early on in this band's career, the depth of emotional range at the disposal of songwriter and singer Paul Dempsey... [it] is a crucial initial chapter in the story of this important Australian band."

A single, "Captain (Million Miles an Hour)", appeared in May 1997. It received heavy airplay on Triple J and was listed at No. 39 on their Hottest 100 for that year. The band's following quickly grew and they toured heavily, scoring gigs on numerous major festivals. Dempsey acknowledged that "It's pretty hard when you start out. It's only now that we're starting to get some serious recognition that we can finally begin to pick & choose where we want to play. But to do that, you have to be able to prove that, as a band, you can really cut it live & draw the crowds."

=== 1998–2002: Beautiful Sharks ===
After about a year in Something for Kate, Ralph had failed to fit in with the other two, he was replaced by Stephanie Ashworth from three-piece indie rockers, Sandpit. Sandpit had released their own debut album, On Second Thought, in May 1998 but they disbanded – founding drummer Paul Sciacca had left ahead of recording sessions. Ashworth on bass guitar, keyboards and backing vocals and Brendan Webb, on lead guitar and vocals, had finished that album with their producer, Greg Wales, also on drums.

Dempsey felt that his group were going through a "really turbulent period" and "completely de-constructed everything" to rebuild after Ashworth joined. He continued, "We've just been lucky because we've got this really natural chemistry between the three of us... We've finally got the right combination of people and we're collaborating the way a band should." By the time Ashworth had joined "she and Dempsey had gone from musical acquaintances to becoming a couple." In June 1998 Something for Kate issued another single, "Roll Credit", which included label mates Jebediah's cover of their song, "Clint" and SFK's cover of Jebediah's "Harpoon". Murmur also issued a split double-7" single/EP with the two versions of "Harpoon" on one disc and both versions of "Clint" on the other.

During 1998 Dempsey set up a side project, Scared of Horses, to release a solo album An Empty Flight, in November that year. He co-wrote and performed the tracks with a variety of fellow artists on lead vocals including Ashworth, Jamie Hutchings of Bluebottle Kiss, Laura MacFarlane of Ninetynine, Andria Prudente of Arrosa, Glenn Richards of Augie March and Heinz Riegler of Not from There.

In late 1998 the band travelled to Toronto to rehearse and record their second album, Beautiful Sharks, again with Paulson as producer. Ashworth and Dempsey co-wrote half of the music for the album. It was released the following June, which reached No. 10 on the ARIA Albums Chart, and was certified gold status by ARIA for shipment of 35,000 copies, in 2001. According to Australian musicologist, Ian McFarlane, "the acclaimed [album] moved beyond the stark instrumentation of the first album into more diverse pastures (for example, the rumbling 'Electricity', the atmospheric 'Beautiful Sharks')". Dino Scatena, an Australian journalist, opined that "a lot of the beauty in [the album] lies in its understated quality ... so subtle, so perfect, any other songwriter would give his little pinky for a moment of such inspiration, such craftsmanship."

"Electricity", their next single, appeared ahead of the album in March 1999 and peaked in the ARIA Singles Chart top 40. It was followed by "Hallways" in August, which did not reach the top 50. Beautiful Sharks was nominated for Best Alternative Release at the ARIA Music Awards of 1999. The band embarked on a major tour with Powderfinger and had three tracks listed in the Triple J Hottest 100, 1999: "Electricity" (No. 44), "Whatever You Want" (No. 70) and "Hallways" (No. 72). They toured Japan and the United States in early 2000, where Ashworth received — and rejected — an offer to join Courtney Love's rock band, Hole.

=== 2001–2002: Echolalia ===
Something for Kate's third studio album, Echolalia (June 2001), was produced by Trina Shoemaker (Sheryl Crow, Queens of the Stone Age). They began work at Mangrove Studios – owned by INXS member Garry Gary Beers – on Sydney's north coast. The sessions in a windowless rehearsal studio stretched out over a year as Dempsey struggled with writer's block. He recalled:

We'd go down there every day, pick up our instruments and wait for something to happen. And we spent a lot of days just sitting there, staring at each other. We'd set a standard for ourselves and I guess we were trying to meet that. Nothing was happening, we got really depressed and we hit a wall. I was spiralling down.

Exasperated, the band travelled to an island in the Gulf of Thailand, where Dempsey wrote "Monsters" in 20 minutes. He said the song, about overcoming self-doubt, broke the drought: "As soon as I stopped thinking about it, as soon as I stopped being a songwriter, it came. So after that, we came home and wrote about 20 songs." Ashworth described Dempsey's guitar work: "Paul was a really percussive guitarist: he's a drummer, first and foremost and he actually taught Clint to play the drums. So he comes from playing the guitar from a really percussive perspective; from a very Fugazi-type of world, creating every aspect of a song on the guitar instead of just melodies."

The album, released in June 2001, peaked at No. 2 and was certified as platinum – for shipment of 70,000 copies – by the end of the year. Lawrence felt that "In many ways, it marks quite a departure from their past two efforts, moving towards a sparser and richer sound, both in terms of instrumentation and the moods it creates. A dazzling evolution for this vital Melbourne trio." It was listed in the top 40 in the book, 100 Best Australian Albums (October 2010). The authors, John O'Donnell, Toby Creswell and Craig Mathieson, explained, "[it is] full of ghosts; figures appear and then disappear; people turn into nothingness as they blindly repeat their daily routines, and protagonists try to find a way to move from the world they know to the world they want."

"Monsters" was issued in April 2001 as the album's lead single, which debuted at No. 15, and is the group's highest charting single. O'Donnell, Creswell and Mathieson described the track's sound, "It begins with purpose, shadowed by a hint of trepidation, but two lines in, as the bass starts to make its point and Dempsey's voice becomes more pointed, the song starts to summon self-belief." Fellow Australian music journalist, Ed Nimmervoll, felt the group had "spent more time on their songs than they'd ever spent in the past. On record the result was the rich and full sound which they haven't been able to capture up until now. Their efforts were rewarded and the band's status confirmed with the first single 'Monsters' becoming the band's first bona fide 'hit'." It was followed by two more singles, "Three Dimensions" (August) and "Twenty Years" (November), which reached the top 50.

The band sold out two national tours and finished the year again supporting Powderfinger. At the ARIA Music Awards of 2001 Something for Kate were nominated in six categories – Album of the Year, Best Group, Best Alternative Release and Best Cover Art (by Ashworth) for Echolalia; and Single of the Year and Best Video (directed by Bart Borghesi) for "Monsters" – but they did not win a trophy. On the Triple J Hottest 100, 2001 "Monsters" as listed at No. 2, "Three Dimensions" at No. 13 and "Twenty Years" at No. 37; while Echolalia was listed as the top album for the year.

=== 2003–2008: The Official Fiction, Desert Lights, and hiatus ===
On 15 August 2003 Something for Kate issued their fourth studio album, The Official Fiction, which is their first number-one album. It was produced by Shoemaker at Mangrove Studios, again. Lawrence opined that it "is the perfect soundtrack to the inevitable self-indulgent melancholy I'll be suffering/enjoying for the next few days/weeks/months. The precisely structured chord progressions, creative arrangements and insightful lyrics are already weaving their magic and cultivating the warm gloom of loss." He noticed that "[Dempsey's] voice is instantly recognisable and familiar as he tells the stories that have become a feature of SFK's unique lyrical content" while "Hyndman's drumming is far from conservative, offering oddly but deftly placed accents and a beat that fights the sugar-sweet melodies to provide a much-needed edge."

The first two singles from the album were "Déjà Vu" (July 2003), which peaked at No. 19, and "Song for a Sleepwalker" (October), which reached the top 40. At the ARIA Music Awards of 2003 SFK received four nominations: Album of the Year, Best Group, Best Rock Album and Best Cover Art (by Ashworth and Dave Horner) for The Official Fiction. It was certified gold by the end of that year. On the Triple J Hottest 100, 2003, "Déjà Vu" was listed at No. 11 and "Song for a Sleepwalker" at No. 63; Official Fiction was listed at No. 6 on the Top 10 Albums of 2003. Ashworth described the group, "We're an album band not a singles band. We write albums and then the record company picks whatever they want to be the single. That's what's really difficult. So for you, you might get a very one-sided idea of what a band's like and then you put the album on and you go: 'Oh, I didn't realize they had this side.' That's where I think singles are a real fucker. I don't like it."

Desert Lights, their fifth studio album (1 June 2006) also topped the charts – their second number-one album. It was certified gold status within a month of its release. They had recorded it over four months in Los Angeles with Brad Wood (Ben Lee, the Smashing Pumpkins, Liz Phair). Dempsey had started working on lyrics for it in the previous year, "Writing this record was difficult. But at the end of it, I've never been happier." Stephanie McDonald of FasterLouder felt its "sound has moved from one of raw, hard rock to something a lot more melodic with pop appeal... [the group] combines both those elements into something truly inspirational."

"Cigarettes and Suitcases", the lead single, was released in May 2006, which reached No. 23, while the follow-up single, "Oh Kamikaze", appeared in September and reached the top 40. Rob Smith of The Dwarf felt that the first single "is SFK at their typical alternative rock best, blending a catchy and melodious chorus with constant beats and a use of light and heavy guitar work. The second single 'Oh, Kamikaze' is a more upbeat number one might almost be able to dance to, if one could dance that is."

A compilation 2×CD album, The Murmur Years, was released on 18 August 2007 with one new song, "The Futurist". According to Nimmervoll "Notwithstanding a couple of one-off reunion shows for their ever-loyal following Something for Kate went into hiatus while their leader concentrated on writing for a solo album." They issued a limited edition 16-track live album, Live at the Corner, as an "artist-controlled bootleg", capturing the sound of the band on stage on 23 February 2008 at the Corner Hotel in Richmond.

=== 2012–2013: Reformation, Leave Your Soul to Science, and second hiatus ===
In mid-2012 Something for Kate resumed their recording career, six years after their previous studio effort. They worked on Leave Your Soul to Science (September 2012) in Dallas with John Congleton (Okkervil River, Shearwater, the New Pornographers) co-producing. Dempsey said they looked for someone to contain them during the recording process: "We recognised an inclination or proclivity among ourselves to procrastinate and keep layering stuff up. We knew that we needed to fight that instinct and he was very much the guy to help us."

The band uploaded two songs from the album to the internet before its release ("Survival Expert" and "The Fireball at the End of Everything") and also played two live shows in Melbourne and Sydney to preview it. The album reached No. 5, and provided three singles, "Survival Expert" (August 2012), "Miracle Cure" (December) and "Star-crossed Citizens" (May 2013).

As part of the band's mid-2013 Star-Crossed Cities Tour, Dempsey recorded Shotgun Karaoke video segments prior to each show, in which he performed cover versions of songs by artists, the Lemonheads, David Bowie, INXS, and Queen. The tour for ended in Hobart on 29 June 2013. By October that year Dempsey had resumed his solo career.

=== 2020: The Modern Medieval ===
In April 2020, Something for Kate released "Situation Room", their first new track in eight years. It served as the lead single for the band's seventh studio album, which at the time was also titled Situation Room and a to-be-decided release date. In July 2020, the band released the album's second single, "Waste Our Breath". In September 2020, the band announced both the album's title as The Modern Medieval and its third single, "Supercomputer". On 1 October 2020, the album's fourth single, "Come Back Before I Come Back to My Senses" was released. The album was released on 20 November and debuted at Number 5 on the ARIA chart 2020.

== Members ==
=== Current members ===
- Paul Dempsey – lead vocals, guitar, keyboards (1994–present)
- Clint Hyndman – drums, percussion (1994–present)
- Stephanie Ashworth – bass, percussion, occasional backing vocals (1998–present)

==== Current touring members ====
- Adrian Stoyles – guitar, keyboards, backing vocals (2015–present)
- Olivia Bartley − backing vocals, percussion, guitar, keyboards (2020–present)

=== Former members ===
- Julian Carroll – bass (1994–1997)
- Toby Ralph – bass (1997–1998)

==== Former touring members ====
- Phillip 'Pip' Branson – rhythm guitar, violin
- Wally Gunn – rhythm guitar, keyboards
- Simon Burke – keyboards
- Anthony Petrucci – rhythm guitar
- John Hedigan – guitar (died 2019)

== Activism ==
In 2004, Something for Kate joined People for the Ethical Treatment of Animals (PETA) in its fight against animal cruelty. As part of their involvement, the band produced an advertisement protesting Kentucky Fried Chicken's (KFC) alleged cruelty to animals.

Dempsey is listed as a supporter of the "Oscar's Law" campaign against the factory farming of companion animals, together with other publicly known figures including musician Mark McEntee, comedian Mick Molloy and the Essendon Football Club.

== Discography ==
- Elsewhere for 8 Minutes (1997)
- Beautiful Sharks (1999)
- Echolalia (2001)
- The Official Fiction (2003)
- Desert Lights (2006)
- Leave Your Soul to Science (2012)
- The Modern Medieval (2020)

== Awards and nominations ==
=== APRA Awards ===
The APRA Awards are presented annually from 1982 by the Australasian Performing Right Association (APRA), "honouring composers and songwriters". They commenced in 1982.

Year	Nominee / work	Award	Result	Ref.
2002	"Monsters" (Paul Dempsey, Stephanie Ashworth, Clint Hyndman)	Song of the Year	Nominated	
2021	"Situation Room" (Paul Dempsey, Stephanie Ashworth, Clint Hyndman)	Song of the Year	Shortlisted	

=== ARIA Music Awards ===
The ARIA Music Awards is an annual awards ceremony that recognises excellence, innovation, and achievement across all genres of Australian music. Something for Kate have been nominated for eleven awards.

Year	Nominee / work	Award	Result
1999	Beautiful Sharks	Best Alternative Release	Nominated
2001	Echolalia	Album of the Year	Nominated
2001	Echolalia	Best Group	Nominated
2001	Echolalia	Best Alternative Release	Nominated
2001	"Monsters"	Single of the Year	Nominated
2001	Bart Borghesi for Something for Kate – "Monsters"	Best Video	Nominated
2001	Stephanie Ashworth for Something for Kate – Echolalia	Best Cover Art	Nominated
2003	The Official Fiction	Album of the Year	Nominated
2003	The Official Fiction	Best Group	Nominated
2003	The Official Fiction	Best Rock Album	Nominated
2003	Stephanie Ashworth & David Homer for Something for Kate – The Official Fiction	Best Cover Art	Nominated

=== EG Awards / Music Victoria Awards ===
The EG Awards (known as Music Victoria Awards since 2013) are an annual awards night celebrating Victorian music. They commenced in 2006.

Year	Nominee / work	Award	Result
2012	"Survival Expert"	Best Song	Nominated
2012	Something for Kate	Best Band	Nominated
