= Stephanie Ashworth =

Australian musician

- Stephanie Ashworth, 14 April 2006; Courtesy: Jerrystandup

Background information
- Born: Stephanie Ashworth; Melbourne, Victoria, Australia
- Genres: Alternative, Australian rock
- Occupation: Musician
- Instruments: Bass, vocals
- Years active: 1994–present
- Labels: Sony/BMG, EMI, Capitol
- Member of: Something for Kate
- Formerly of: Sandpit; Scared of Horses
- Spouse: Paul Dempsey (m. 2006)

Stephanie Ashworth is an Australian bassist, photographer, artist and columnist, known for being a member of the bands Sandpit and Something for Kate, in which she performs with her spouse, Paul Dempsey, the frontman.

== Music career ==
Early in Ashworth's career, she played in the bands Sandpit and Scared of Horses. Her most recent band is Something for Kate, which she joined replacing bassist Toby Ralph in March 1998, a fill-in after Julian Carroll's departure. She frequently performs barefoot. In 2000, she was offered a place in Courtney Love's band, Hole, but declined.

== Writing and photography ==
Ashworth has contributed artwork and photography to the releases of Something for Kate. Her photos of New York City were used for the 2012 album Leave Your Soul to Science.

Since January 2008, Ashworth has written a monthly column for Jmag, the magazine of Australian radio station Triple J.

== Personal life ==
Ashworth married her bandmate and Something for Kate frontman, Paul Dempsey, in 2006, and remains in this relationship as of 2022. Following the release of Dempsey's solo album Everything Is True, they relocated to New York City, United States, in 2010. Their son Miller was born in 2011.

== Awards and nominations ==
=== APRA Awards ===
The APRA Awards are presented annually from 1982 by the Australasian Performing Right Association (APRA), "honouring composers and songwriters".

Year	Nominee / work	Award	Result	Ref.
2002	"Monsters" by Something for Kate (Paul Dempsey, Stephanie Ashworth, Clint Hyndman)	Song of the Year	Nominated	
2021	"Situation Room by Something for Kate (Paul Dempsey, Stephanie Ashworth, Clint Hyndman)	Song of the Year	Shortlisted	
