= Paul Dempsey =

Australian musician (born 1976)

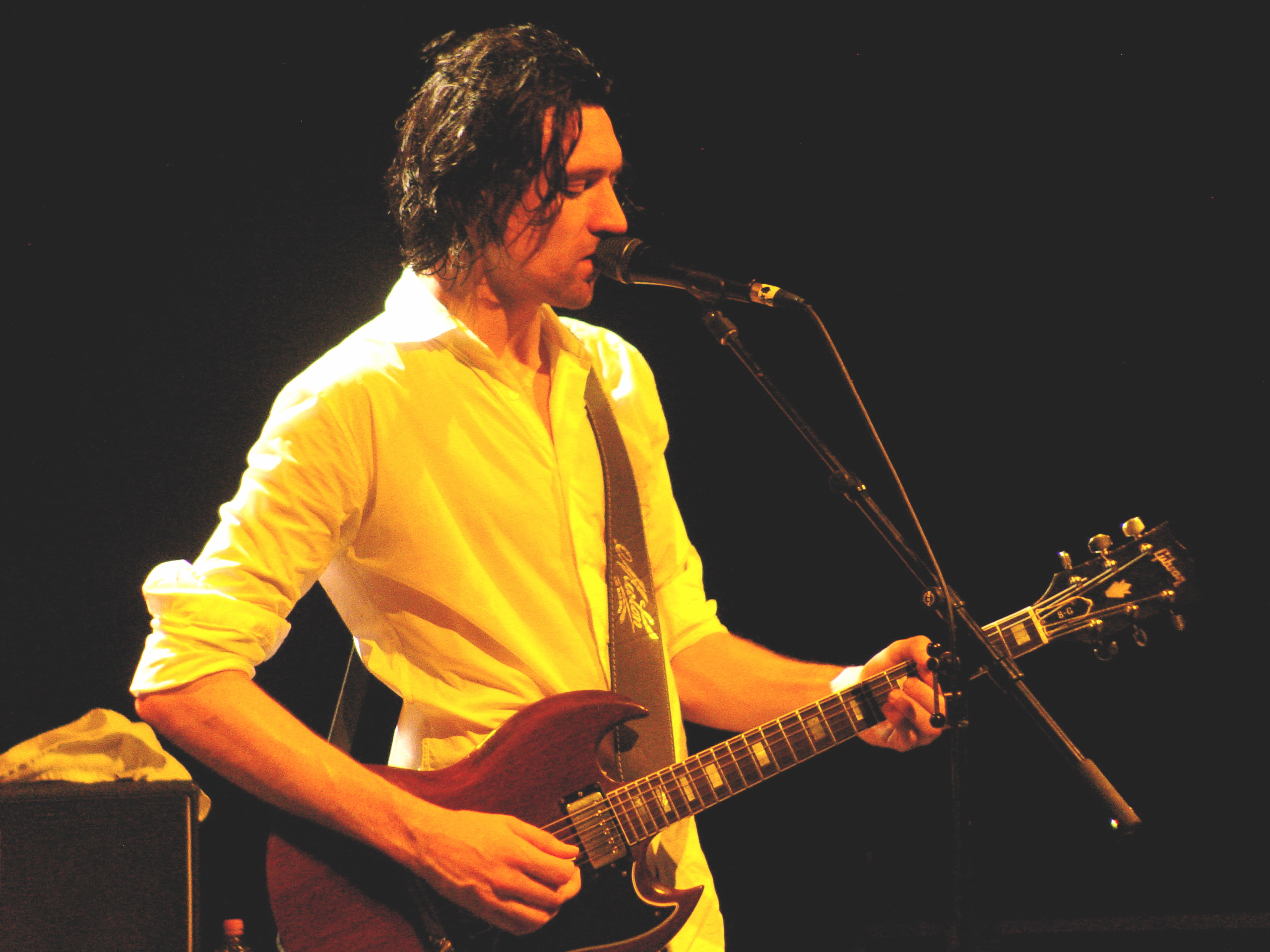
- Dempsey on guitar and vocals, September 2006

Background information
- Born: Paul Anthony Dempsey; 25 May 1976 (age 50); Melbourne, Victoria, Australia
- Genres: Alternative rock; Australian rock; folk
- Occupations: Singer; songwriter; musician
- Instruments: Guitar; vocals; bass; keyboards; drums
- Years active: 1994–present
- Labels: Sony BMG; EMI
- Member of: Something for Kate, Fanning Dempsey National Park
- Spouse: Stephanie Ashworth (m. 2006)
- Website: pauldempseymusic.com

Paul Anthony Dempsey (born 25 May 1976) is an Australian musician. He is best known as the lead singer, guitarist and principal lyricist of rock group Something for Kate. Dempsey released his debut solo album, Everything Is True, on 20 August 2009, which peaked at No. 5 on the ARIA Albums Chart. He has also produced and co-written albums for other artists, including Mosman Alder.

Dempsey has experienced bouts of clinical depression and periods of writer's block, both of which have been publicised. Australian musicologist Ian McFarlane noted that he "has the capacity to lay his soul bare through his music, there is little pretence or adherence to fashionable measures in the band's delivery". In 2006, Dempsey married Something for Kate's bass guitarist Stephanie Ashworth (formerly of Sandpit).

== Early years ==
Dempsey was born on 25 May 1976 and grew up in Melbourne. His father, Charlie Dempsey (born 7 November 1937), and mother, Gillian (née Barrington, born 25 May 1944), were recent Irish immigrants. Charlie died in a car accident when Dempsey was one year old and "too young to remember". He and his three older sisters, including Gillian "Jill" (born 1964) and Moira (born 1967), were raised by his mother and grandmother.

After initially learning piano from his grandmother, Dempsey switched to guitar when he was eight, and later taught himself to play drums. For his final years of secondary schooling he attended Padua College on the Mornington Peninsula, where he was interested in playing basketball.

== Musical career ==
=== 1994–2007: Something for Kate ===
In mid-1994, six months after leaving Padua College, Dempsey, on lead guitar and lead vocals, formed Something for Kate in Melbourne, Australia, with school friend Clint Hyndman on drums. They soon recruited Julian Carroll to play bass guitar by advertising in local record stores.

Initially named Fish of the Day, the group were renamed after a gig at the Punter's Club, with Dempsey's Jack Russell dog, Kate, serving as the key inspiration. They played two shows before they released a demo tape in 1995. In early 1996, they were signed to the Sony subsidiary label Murmur Records by A&R representative Chris Dunn—all of the members were 19 years old at the time. From 1996 to 2007, the band released five studio albums, four of which peaked within the ARIA top 10. In 2007, the band announced they were on a hiatus.

In late 1997, Dempsey filled in as a guitarist for Brisbane band Fur, and Perth-based band Ammonia. He also played drums for two Bluebottle Kiss shows and for his sister's band, John Smith.

In 1998, he recorded an album of songs that he had written for a side project with other musicians (including Glenn Richards of Augie March) called Scared of Horses.

In 2003, he produced and played drums, bass, guitar and keyboards on The Givegoods' 2003 album, I Want to Kill a Rich Man. The Givegoods was the project of Tom Morgan (Smudge) and Andy Calvert, with assistance from Evan Dando (The Lemonheads) and Juanita Stein (Waikiki and Howling Bells).

=== 2008–2011: Solo career and Everything Is True ===
In 2009, he had commenced recording an album titled Everything Is True in Los Angeles with mix engineer-producer Doug Boehm—in April 2009, the process was complete. The first single, "Out the Airlock", was briefly offered as a free download on his website before being officially released on 15 May 2009. The album was released on 14 August 2009 and peaked at No. 5 on the ARIA Album Chart. At the ARIA Music Awards of 2009, Dempsey and the album were nominated for three ARIA Awards: ARIA Award for Best Male Artist, ARIA Award for Best Adult Contemporary Album and ARIA Award for Producer of the Year.

Following the release of his solo album, Dempsey and Ashworth relocated to New York, US, for two years in 2010. While in the US, Dempsey formed a backing band but also performed solo shows; in a June 2013 interview, Dempsey explained: "In our two years in New York I think I played more shows in that two years than I had in the previous 10. I felt like I was being what I regard as a working musician, actually going out and playing music every night or several nights a week. As someone who's been doing it for nearly 20 years, I think it is important to put yourself in situations where you feel like you're doing it for the first time and you still have something to prove to an audience and—most importantly—to yourself."

In October 2009 at the Melbourne International Arts Festival, Dempsey performed in the world premiere of the musical theatre production of Dirtsong, created by Black Arm Band. The songs were written by Alexis Wright, with some sung in Indigenous languages. The show was reprised as the closing show at the 2014 Adelaide Festival. Other performers included Trevor Jamieson (2014 only), Archie Roach, Lou Bennett, Jimmy Barnes, and Emma Donovan.

In 2010, Dempsey played a variety of instruments on several of Melbourne dance artist T-Rek's albums, and contributed keyboards on Melbourne band The Nation Blue's album Protest Songs. In April 2010, Dempsey produced and mixed the third studio EP, Heavy Harm, by Sydney rock band, Papa VS Pretty.

In October 2011, Dempsey performed with the Black Arm Band, Archie Roach, Mavis Staples, Ricki Lee Jones, and Joss Stone in "Notes From the Hard Road and Beyond", which was part of the Melbourne Festival and was held at The Sidney Myer Music Bowl. Dempsey played guitar and performed a duet with Stone, sang with Staples, and performed a rendition of "A Hard Rain's A-Gonna Fall" with Australian singer-songwriter Shane Howard.

=== 2012–2024: Something for Kate and solo work ===
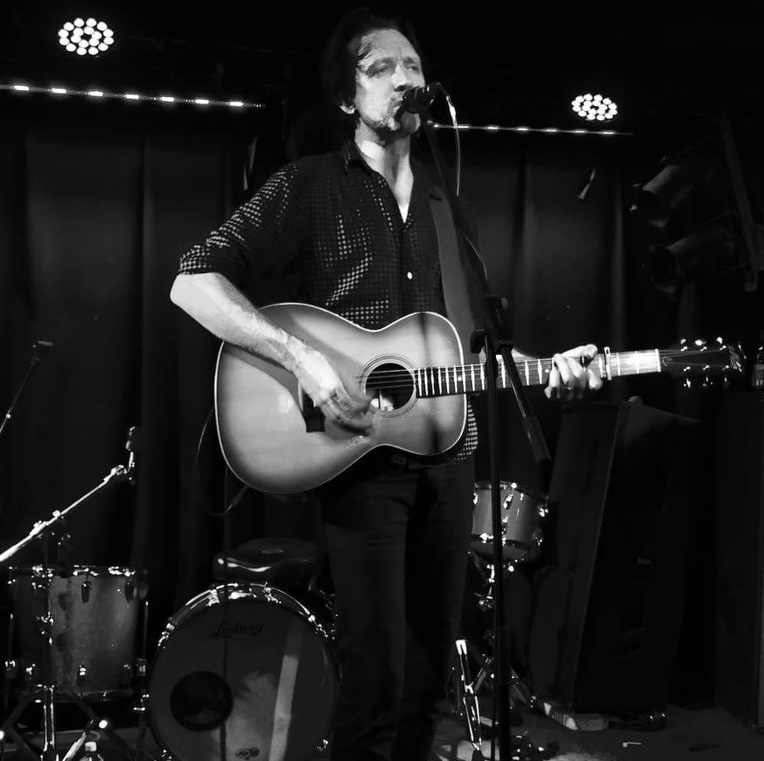
Dempsey performing in Melbourne, 2018

In September 2012, the sixth Something for Kate studio album, Leave Your Soul to Science, was released and debuted at No. 5 on the ARIA Album Chart. The band commenced a national Australian tour in support of the album in June 2013. Dempsey revealed his ongoing enthusiasm for live performance prior to the tour: "I enjoy getting out and playing more than ever. I get more impatient and frustrated that I can't do it more often."

Dempsey released a second solo album called Shotgun Karaoke, which was released on 4 October 2013 and peaked at No. 17 on the ARIA Album Chart.

In January 2014, Dempsey produced the debut album, Humdrum Star, for six-piece Brisbane band Mosman Alder. The album was released on Dew Process Records.

In late 2014, Dempsey commenced production work on a new album for Mike Noga, former drummer of The Drones. Based on the experiences of fellow musicians like Davey Lane (You Am I), Noga launched a Pozible campaign to pay for the anticipated recording costs of A$16,000. Noga explained seven days prior to the close of the campaign in late November 2014 that he asked Dempsey to produce the album:

"Paul and I have been friends for many years now and we've discovered that we work pretty damn well together. I'm somewhat 'loose' when it comes to songwriting and he is the exact opposite, so put us together in a room and it all evens out quite nicely. He also knows a hell of a lot about recording equipment which I profess to know absolutely nothing about ... He hears things others don't."

In regard to the changes that the internet has had on the music industry, Dempsey said in November 2014: "A ton of things have changed and a ton of things haven't changed. I think the only brand new hurdle is that most music is now simply there for the taking and a large proportion of the population seem disinclined to assign any value at all to the hard work and resources that went into creating it. Other than that, the only thing that matters is the only thing that's ever mattered (in my opinion) and that is getting out there and playing your arse off in front of people anywhere you can, anytime you can. It's better than radio, it's better than the internet, it's better than a review and it's better for you and your band. If you want to be a musician, go be a musician. Be prepared to lose money and play to no one [but] hopefully it'll get better as you get better."

Fanning collaborated with Paul Dempsey on a project called Fanning Dempsey National Park. Their debut album, The Deluge, was released on 2 August 2024.

=== 2024–present: Fanning Dempsey National Park & Shotgun Karaoke Vol. II ===
In 2024, Dempsey collaborated with Bernard Fanning on a project called Fanning Dempsey National Park. Their debut album, The Deluge, was released on 2 August 2024.

In August 2025, Dempsey announced the release of Shotgun Karaoke Vol. II. The album, set for release in October 2025, features cover versions of songs by artists such as Cher, Patti Smith, Carla Geneve and R.E.M.

== Television ==
Dempsey appeared as a panellist on RocKwiz on 24 February 2007, performing a solo version of "Monsters" and George Michael's "Careless Whisper" with Kate Miller-Heidke. He also appeared on Good News Week on 26 October 2009, performing the song "Fire" by Bruce Springsteen as part of the "Strange But True" segment. Dempsey appeared on RocKwiz again on 8 June. He performed a solo version of "Survival Expert" from Something for Kate's album Leave Your Soul to Science as well as Hall & Oates "Out of Touch" with Emily Lubitz.

== Personal life ==
Stephanie Ashworth, on bass guitar with Something for Kate, April 2006. Dempsey and Ashworth were married in Las Vegas during 2005.

In 2006, Dempsey married bandmate and long-term domestic partner Stephanie Ashworth in Las Vegas, Nevada. They are parents to a son, Miller, who was born in May 2011. In 2010, the couple had relocated to New York City, for two years, and Dempsey revealed his intention to return to the American city in a June 2013 interview.

Dempsey has suffered bouts of clinical depression and has also complained about periods of writer's block. In a 2010 interview he explained:

I think a lot of people who suffer from depression feel guilty. They feel like being selfish, they feel like they shouldn't talk about it because they sound like they are whining. I think it is important to not be like that and talk about it, so that people think that it is OK to talk about it. If anybody sees me talking about it and therefore thinks that it is alright for them to talk to their friends about it, then that is a good thing. I get a lot of emails and a lot of letters from people who tell me that they are going through the same thing or that they had battles with depression as well and that it gave them some sort of strength or consolation to know that someone else that they respect goes through that as well. It is a lot of people! It is one in five people in Australia.

In a November 2014 interview conducted by Mosman Alder, Dempsey replied to a question about whether he believes in the possibility of a soul or an afterlife by saying: "No more than I believe in the 'possibility' of a tooth fairy"; the interviewer described him as "a man of science and a sinful heathen-atheist". Later in the interview, Dempsey said that he is a fan of the astrophysicist Neil deGrasse Tyson, whose writings he has read, and whom he has seen in a live discussion with Brian Greene that was held in New York City.

In November 2014, Dempsey said that his all-time favourite band is Fugazi.

== Discography ==
=== Solo ===
==== Studio albums ====
Title	Album details	Peak chart positions	Certification
Title	Album details	AUS	Certification
Everything Is True	Released: 20 August 2009; Label: EMI Australia (5099968447922); Format: CD, digital download	5	ARIA: Gold
Shotgun Karaoke	Released: 31 October 2013; Label: EMI Australia (3755469); Format: CD, digital download	17	
Strange Loop	Released: 13 May 2016; Label: EMI Australia (4777227); Format: CD, 2×LP, digital download	5	
Shotgun Karaoke Vol. II	Released: 24 October 2025; Label: EMI Australia (7871625); Format: Streaming, CD, LP, digital download	8	

==== Extended plays ====
Title	EP details
Counterfeits and Forgeries	Released: August 2009; Label: EMI Australia (5099968551322); Format: Limited Edition CD
iTunes Live from Sydney	Released: 16 October 2009; Label: Paul Dempsey; Format: DD

==== Singles ====
List of singles, with selected chart positions
Title	Year	Peak chart positions	Certification	Album
Title	Year	AUS	Certification	Album
"Out the Airlock"	2009	84		Everything Is True
"Ramona Was a Waitress"	2009	85	ARIA: Gold	Everything Is True
"Fast Friends"	2009	—		Everything Is True
"Bats"	2010	—		Everything Is True
"We'll Never Work in the Town Again"	2010	—		Non-album single
"Morningless"	2016	—		Strange Loop
"The True Sea"	2016	—		Strange Loop
"Idiot Oracle"	2016	—		Strange Loop
"The Sky's Gone Missing"	2018	—		Vast
"Fashionably Late (Every New Year's Day)" (with Shannen James)	2021	—		Non-album single
"If I Could Turn Back Time"	2025	—		Shotgun Karaoke Vol. II
"Boys of Summer"	2025	—		Shotgun Karaoke Vol. II
"—" denotes a recording that did not chart or was not released.

== Guest appearances ==
Year	Title	Artist	Album
2010	"Your Lovin' Is On My Mind"	various artists	Before Too Long: Triple J Tribute to Paul Kelly
2010	"Addicted"	various artists	He Will Have His Way
2013	"Sunrise"	with Darren Middleton	Translations
2016	"Calling Out"	with Pez	Don't Look Down

=== See also ===
- Something for Kate
- Fanning Dempsey National Park

== Awards and nominations ==
=== APRA Awards ===
The APRA Awards are presented annually from 1982 by the Australasian Performing Right Association (APRA), "honouring composers and songwriters".

Year	Nominee / work	Award	Result	Ref.
2002	"Monsters" by Something for Kate (Paul Dempsey, Stephanie Ashworth, Clint Hyndman)	Song of the Year	Nominated	
2020	"Fear Of Missing Out" by Ainslie Wills (Ainslie Wills, Paul Dempsey, Lawrence Folvig, Arron Light)	Song of the Year	Shortlisted	
2021	"Situation Room by Something for Kate (Paul Dempsey, Stephanie Ashworth, Clint Hyndman)	Song of the Year	Shortlisted	
2025	"Disconnect" by Fanning Dempsey National Park (Paul Dempsey / Bernard Fanning)	Song of the Year	Shortlisted	

=== ARIA Music Awards ===
The ARIA Music Awards is an annual awards ceremony that recognises excellence, innovation, and achievement across all genres of Australian music.

Year	Nominee / work	Award	Result	Ref.
2009	Paul Dempsey	ARIA Award for Best Male Artist	Nominated	
2009	Paul Dempsey & Wayne Connolly,	ARIA Award for Producer of the Year	Nominated	
2009	Everything Is True	ARIA Award for Best Adult Contemporary Album	Nominated	

=== National Live Music Awards ===
The National Live Music Awards (NLMAs) are a broad recognition of Australia's diverse live industry, celebrating the success of the Australian live scene. The awards commenced in 2016.

Year	Nominee / work	Award	Result
2016	himself	Live Voice of the Year	Nominated
2016	himself	Victorian Live Voice of the Year	Won

=== EG Awards/Music Victoria Awards ===
The Music Victoria Awards (previously known as The Age EG Awards and The Age Music Victoria Awards) are an annual awards night celebrating Victorian music.

Year	Nominee / work	Award	Result
2009	himself	Best Male Artist	unknown
2009	Everything Is True	Best Album	unknown
