= Richard Smallwood discography =

- Studio albums: 10
- Live albums: 6
- Compilation albums: 9
- Video albums: 6

American singer and musician Richard Smallwood has released ten studio albums, six live albums, six compilation albums and six video albums.

== Albums ==
=== Studio albums ===
List of studio albums, with selected chart positions and sales figures
Title	Album details	Peak chart positions		
Title	Album details	US	US Gospel	US Christ.
Look Up and Live (with the Union Temple Baptist Church Young Adult Choir)	Released: 1974	—	—	—
Give Us Peace (with the Union Temple Baptist Church Young Adult Choir)	Released: 1976	—	—	—
The Richard Smallwood Singers (with the Richard Smallwood Singers)	Released: 1982; Label: Onyx (#3803)	—	2	—
Psalms (with the Richard Smallwood Singers)	Released: 1984; Label: Onyx (#3833)	—	1	—
Textures (with the Richard Smallwood Singers)	Released: February 3, 1987; Label: Word (#8355)	—	7	26
Vision (with the Richard Smallwood Singers)	Released: August 24, 1988; Label: Word (#8406)	—	9	—
Portrait (with the Richard Smallwood Singers)	Released: May 16, 1990; Label: Word (#8469)	—	9	—
Testimony (with the Richard Smallwood Singers)	Released: May 14, 1992; Label: Sparrow (#1283)	—	8	30
Rejoice (with Vision)	Released: August 26, 1997; Label: Verity (#43097), Zomba	—	18	—
Promises (with Vision)	Released: July 15, 2011; Label: Verity (#88697514992)	63	1	—
"—" denotes releases that did not chart or were not released in that territory.

=== Live albums ===
List of live albums, with selected chart positions and sales figures
Title	Album details	Peak chart positions			Sales
Title	Album details	US	US Gospel	US Christ.	Sales
Live (with the Richard Smallwood Singers)	Released: August 24, 1993; Label: Sparrow (#51352)	—	11	—	
Adoration: Live in Atlanta (with Vision)	Released: April 30, 1996; Label: Verity (#43015), Zomba	—	5	—	
Healing: Live in Detroit (with Vision)	Released: June 1, 1999; Label: Verity (#43119), Zomba	—	3	—	US: 57,000
Persuaded: Live in D.C. (with Vision)	Released: August 7, 2001; Label: Verity (#43172), Zomba	189	3	16	
Journey: Live in New York (with Vision)	Released: September 26, 2006; Label: Verity (#62226), Zomba	162	1	—	
Anthology Live (with Vision)	Released: May 26, 2015; Label: RCA	— (Note: Anthology Live did not enter the Billboard 200, but peaked at number 84 on the US Top Current Album Sales chart.)	1	—	
"—" denotes releases that did not chart or were not released in that territory.

=== Compilation albums ===
List of compilation albums, with selected chart positions
Title	Album details	Peak chart positions
Title	Album details	US Gospel
Gospel Greats (with the Richard Smallwood Singers)	Released: September 13, 1994; Label: Benson (#84039)	—
Memorable Moments	Released: September 14, 1999; Label: Sparrow (#20253)	19
The Praise & Worship Songs of Richard Smallwood (with Vision)	Released: October 21, 2003; Label: Verity (#53710), Zomba	13
Quintessential Collection	Released: April 10, 2007; Label: EMI (#86435)	—
The Center of My Joy (with the Richard Smallwood Singers)	Released: August 28, 2007; Label: Shanachie (#5767)	—
The Definitive Gospel Collection	Released: May 20, 2008; Label: Word (#8874082)	—
Setlist: The Very Best of Richard Smallwood Live	Released: July 12, 2011; Label: Legacy, Verity (#88697 92561 2)	—
Beginnings	Released: January 24, 2012; Label: Word (#WD2-888510)	—
20th Century Masters - The Millennium Collection: The Best Of Richard Smallwood	Released: September 25, 2015; Label: Motown Gospel (#002320702)	20
"—" denotes releases that did not chart or were not released in that territory.

=== Video albums ===
List of video albums, with selected chart positions
Title	Album details	Peak chart positions
Title	Album details	US Music Videos
Richard Smallwood Singers Video Celebration (with the Richard Smallwood Singers)	Released: July 1, 1991; Label: A&M (#1727)	—
Adoration: Live in Atlanta (with Vision)	Released: May 21, 1996; Label: Verity (#43015)	—
Healing: Live in Detroit (with Vision)	Released: July 13, 1999; Label: Verity (#43119)	20
Persuaded: Live in D.C. (with Vision)	Released: September 11, 2001; Label: Verity (#43172)	24
The Praise & Worship Songs of Richard Smallwood (with Vision)	Released: November 4, 2003; Label: Verity (#53862)	—
Journey: Live in New York (with Vision)	Released: September 26, 2006; Label: Verity (#2226)	—
"—" denotes releases that did not chart or were not released in that territory.

== Singles ==
=== As a lead artist ===
List of singles, with selected chart positions, showing year released and album name
Title	Year	Peak chart positions		Album
Title	Year	US Gospel	US Cashbox Gospel	Album
"Vision" (with the Richard Smallwood Singers)	1989	—N/a	12	Vision
"What He’s Done for Me" (with the Richard Smallwood Singers)	1993	—N/a	3	Testimony
"I'll Trust You" (with Vision)	2007	15	—N/a	Journey: Live in New York
"Trust Me" (with Vision)	2011	9	—N/a	Promises
"Same God" (with Vision)	2015	24	—N/a	Anthology Live
"—" denotes releases that did not chart or were not released in that territory.

=== As a featured artist ===
List of singles, with selected chart positions, showing year released and album name
Title	Year	Peak chart positions	Album
Title	Year	US Gospel	Album
"I Give You Praise" (Robert E. Person featuring Richard Smallwood)	2017	—	Classic Covers
"—" denotes releases that did not chart or were not released in that territory.

== Other charted songs ==
List of other charted songs, with selected chart positions, showing year released and album name
Title	Year	Peak chart positions		Album
Title	Year	US Gospel Digital Sales	US Gospel Stream.	Album
"Total Praise" (with Vision)	1996	6	—	Adoration: Live in Atlanta
"Don't Cry" (with Kirk Franklin)	2000	6	11	Rebirth of Kirk Franklin
"Morning's Breaking" (with Vision, featuring Kelly Price)	2007	15	—	Journey: Live in New York
"—" denotes releases that did not chart or were not released in that territory.

== Guest appearances ==
List of non-single guest appearances, with other performing artists, showing year released and album name
Title	Year	Other artist(s)	Album	Ref.
"He Gave Me Sunshine"	1990	Reflex	We Love Gospel Music II	
"Rejoice Greatly, O Daughter of Zion"	1992	The Richard Smallwood Singers	Handel's Messiah: A Soulful Celebration	
"Don't Cry"	2002	Kirk Franklin	The Rebirth of Kirk Franklin	
"Lamb"	2004	Donald Lawrence & Co.	I Speak Life	
"When Jesus Came into My Life"	2004	Mark Hubbard	Blessin' Waitin' on Me	
"Total Praise"	2005	Donnie McClurkin	Psalms, Hymns & Spiritual Songs	
"What a Friend"	2006	Kelly Price	This Is Who I Am	
"Lord You Are"	2007	Tramaine Hawkins	I Never Lost My Praise	
"Don't Worry (He's On Time)"	2007	7 Sons of Soul	Witness	
"Healing"	2009	Earnest Pugh	Earnest Pugh Live - Rain On Us	
"Lead Me, Guide Me"	2012	Doris Akers	Journeysongs Third Edition: Volume 21	
"Highway to Heaven"	2016	Robert Anderson, Inez Andrews, The Caravans, Jessy Dixon, Margaret Douroux, Leann Faine, Walter Hawkins, Jennifer Holliday, Joe Ligon, Babbie Mason, Dorothy Norwood, Edgar O'Neal, Kitty Parham, Billy Preston, Vernon Oliver Price, The Barrett Sisters, Angela Spivey, Rev. Donald Vails, Albertina Walker, Romance Watson, Richard White, Isaac Whittman, Velma Willis	Gospel Pioneer Reunion	
"I Shall Wear a Crown"	2016	Robert Anderson, Inez Andrews, The Caravans, Jessy Dixon, Margaret Douroux, Leann Faine, Walter Hawkins, Jennifer Holliday, Joe Ligon, Babbie Mason, Dorothy Norwood, Edgar O'Neal, Kitty Parham, Billy Preston, Vernon Oliver Price, The Barrett Sisters, Angela Spivey, Rev. Donald Vails, Albertina Walker, Romance Watson, Richard White, Isaac Whittman, Velma Willis	Gospel Pioneer Reunion	
"The Center of My Joy"	2016	—N/a	Gospel Pioneer Reunion	
