= Bobby Jones (singer) =

American gospel music singer and television host (born 1946)

- Born: September 18, 1939 (age 86); Henry, Tennessee, U.S.
- Origin: Nashville, Tennessee, U.S.
- Genres: Christian, urban contemporary gospel
- Occupations: Singer, radio host, television host

Bobby Jones (born September 18, 1938) is an American gospel singer, television host, and radio broadcaster from Nashville, Tennessee. He is best known as the host and executive producer of several cable television programs, most notably Bobby Jones Gospel, which premiered on Black Entertainment Television (BET) in 1980 and became one of the longest-running original series in cable television history. NPR referred to him as the Ed Sullivan of gospel music, for his role in launching the careers of many gospel stars.

On radio, Jones hosts The Bobby Jones Radio Show, a daily one-hour music program distributed by American Urban Radio Networks. He won a Grammy Award for best soul gospel performance by a duo or group for "I’m So Glad I’m Standing Here Today", a duet with country singer Barbara Mandrell, and received the 2025 Grammy Lifetime Achievement Award. He has also been inducted into the Gospel Music Hall of Fame and the Black Music & Entertainment Walk of Fame.

== Early life and education ==
Jones was born September 18, 1938, in Henry, Tennessee, to Augusta Tharpe Jones and Jim Jones. He graduated with a B.S. in elementary education from Tennessee State University, an Ed.D. degree from Vanderbilt University and a Th.D. from Payne's Theological Seminary. Jones is a member of Phi Beta Sigma fraternity. Prior to embarking on his career as a musician, he taught in the St. Louis Public School system from 1959 to 1965; the Nashville Metropolitan Schools from 1966 to 1968; then subsequently became a textbook consultant for McGraw Hill and worked as an instructor at Tennessee State University from 1974 to 1986.

== Career ==
=== Television and radio ===
Jones began his television career in 1976, when Nashville station WSM-TV (now WSMV) gave him a slot on the Sunday morning schedule with Nashville Gospel. That show continued for some 25 years, with a number of hosts. Jones launched his variety program, Bobby Jones Gospel, on BET in 1980. His shows figure prominently in the channel's Sunday lineup, consistently ranking in the Top 5 of overall BET weekly programming. In addition to his work for BET, Jones produced and hosted a similar half-hour program for WDCN-TV (now WNPT), Nashville's public television outlet, during the early 1980s. The show was seen early Saturday evenings.

Bobby Jones Gospel lays claim to offering the first prime exposure to several Gospel music solo artists and groups including Kirk Franklin, Mary Mary, Yolanda Adams, and Smokie Norful. Other artists featured have included Albertina Walker, Patti LaBelle, Dorothy Norwood, and Helen Baylor.

Jones also hosts shows for other television networks including Bobby Jones' Next Generation on the Gospel Music Channel and Bobby Jones Presents for The Word Network. On radio, he hosts The Bobby Jones Radio Show, a daily one-hour music program distributed by American Urban Radio Networks. Jones previously hosted the weekly The Bobby Jones Gospel Countdown which ran for more than a decade on AURN. Jones also oversees the Nashville Super Choir.

=== Books ===
Jones has authored two books. In 2000, his memoir, Make A Joyful Noise (St. Martins Press) included chapters about his tiff with the Winans family and his personal conversations with the Rev. James Cleveland. Both topics were controversial and caused some friction with Gospel's first family and Cleveland's music organization, the Gospel Music Workshop of America. In 1999, Jones released Touched By God (Simon & Schuster), a collection of stories by Gospel artists about how God has changed their lives.

== Awards and nominations ==
=== GMA Dove Awards ===
Year	Category	Nominated work	Result	Ref.
1970	Graphic Layout and Design	Fill My Cup, Lord (with The Blackwood Brothers)	Nominated	
1981	Contemporary Black Gospel Album of the Year	Caught Up (with New Life)	Nominated	
1983	Group of the Year	Bobby Jones & New Life	Nominated	
1983	Inspiration Black Gospel Album of the Year	Soul Set Free (with New Life)	Nominated	
1984	Contemporary Black Gospel Album	Come Together (with New Life)	Won	
1987	Contemporary Black Gospel Album	Another Time (with New Life)	Nominated	
1999	Traditional Gospel Recorded Song	"Just A Closer Walk With Thee" (with New Life)	Nominated	
2015	Lifetime Achievement Award	Himself	Honored	
2023	Jackie Patillo Leadership Award	Himself	Honored	

=== Grammy Awards ===
Year	Category	Nominated work	Result	Ref.
1984	Best Soul Gospel Performance By A Duo Or Group	"I'm So Glad I'm Standing Here Today" (shared with Barbara Mandrell)	Won	
2025	Lifetime Achievement Award	Himself	Honored	

=== Stellar Awards ===
Year	Category	Nominated work	Result	Ref.
2009	Special Event CD of the Year	Bobby Jones Presents Ultimate Gospel	Nominated	
2010	Music Video of the Year	"Dr. Bobby Jones presents Renee Spearman and Prez"	Nominated	
2023	Thomas A. Dorsey Most Notable Achievement Award	Himself	Honored	

=== Miscellaneous awards and honors ===
Year	Award	Category	Nominated work	Result	Ref.
1980	Gabriel Award		Make a Joyful Noise	Won	
2002	BET	Chairman Award	Himself	Honored	
2003	The Full Gospel Baptist Convention	Trailblazer Award	Himself	Honored	
2008	Gospel Music Hall of Fame		Himself	Inducted	
2011	Music City Walk of Fame		Himself	Inducted	
2023	Black Music & Entertainment Walk of Fame		Himself	Inducted	

== Personal life ==
Jones has a wife, Ethel, and they have a daughter, Sonnetta.
