= Fred Mendelsohn =

American music executive (1917–2000)

- Born: May 16, 1917
- Died: April 28, 2000 (age 82)
- Occupations: Record producer; record label founder and president; songwriter; talent scout
- Known for: President of Savoy Records

Fred Mendelsohn (May 16, 1917 – April 28, 2000) was an American music executive. The president of Savoy Records for 42 years, he was the first man to ever record, promote and market black gospel music as a national company. His dedication and contributions built the historic foundation for the black gospel music industry.

Many of today's major gospel artists started on Savoy under the leadership of Mendelsohn. As a talent scout for the label, he discovered artists such as Nappy Brown, C. J. Johnson, and James Cleveland, and promoted Cleveland with many background church choirs. In doing this he was responsible for building the choir market.

Mendelsohn was responsible for such historic acts as The Caravans featuring Albertina Walker, Inez Andrews, Shirley Caesar, Dorothy Norwood, Delores Washington, The Barrett Sisters, Dorothy Love Coates & The Gospel Harmonettes and Clara Ward.

As a songwriter, he co-wrote, with Rose Marie McCoy, Brown's 1955 hit single "Don't Be Angry".
