= Mary Don't You Weep =

1915 song performed by Fisk Jubilee Singers

Song
- Recorded: 1915 (first recording), Fisk Jubilee Singers
- Genre: Gospel, spiritual

"Mary Don't You Weep" (alternately titled "O Mary Don't You Weep", "Oh Mary, Don't You Weep, Don't You Mourn", or variations thereof) is a Spiritual that originates from before the American Civil War. As such, scholars sometimes refer to it as a "slave song", "a label that describes their origins among the enslaved", and it contains "coded messages of hope and resistance". It is considered "one of the most important Negro spirituals". It is listed as number 11823 in the Roud Folk Song Index.

The song tells the Biblical story of Mary of Bethany and her distraught pleas to Jesus to raise her brother Lazarus from the dead. Other narratives relate to The Exodus and the Passage of the Red Sea, with the chorus proclaiming Pharaoh's army got drownded! [sic]. With liberation thus one of its themes, the song again became popular during the Civil Rights Movement. Additionally, a song that explicitly chronicles the victories of the Civil Rights Movement, "If You Miss Me from the Back of the Bus", written by Charles Neblett of the Freedom Singers, was sung to this tune and became one of the most well-known songs of that movement.

In 2015, the Swan Silvertones's version of the song was inducted into the Library of Congress's National Recording Registry for the song's "cultural, artistic and/or historical significance to American society and the nation’s audio legacy". In June 2026, CBS News included the song in its list of the 250 essential American songs of the past 250 years.

== Recordings ==
The first recording of the song was by the Fisk Jubilee Singers in 1915. The folklorist Alan Lomax recorded several traditional variants of the song in the 1930s, 40s and 50s across the United States, from Mississippi to Ohio to Michigan, including one version by Huddie Ledbetter (Lead Belly) of Louisiana in 1935.

The best-known recordings were made by the vocal gospel group the Caravans in 1958, with Inez Andrews as the lead singer, and the Swan Silvertones in 1959.

Mary Don't You Weep became the Swan Silvertones' greatest hit. Aretha Franklin's live performance of the song, recorded in 1972 with James Cleveland for her album, Amazing Grace—the best-selling gospel album of all time—remains a landmark moment in music history. Lead singer Claude Jeter's interpolation I'll Be Your Bridge Over Deep Water If You Trust In My Name served as Paul Simon's inspiration to write his 1970 song Bridge over Troubled Water. A later interpolation in the spiritual's lyrics God gave Noah the rainbow sign, no more water the fire next time is widely referred to as inspiring the title for The Fire Next Time, James Baldwin's 1963 account of race relations in America, but the earliest popular version of the song containing this lyric is Pete Seeger's, from 1964, and postdates the book's publication.

Many other recordings have been made by artists ranging from the Soul Stirrers to Burl Ives. Singer Bing Crosby included the song in a medley on his album 101 Gang Songs (1961). Singer Pete Seeger gave it additional folk music visibility by performing it at the 1964 Newport Folk Festival, and played it many times throughout his career, adapting the lyrics and stating the song's relevance as an American song, not just a spiritual. In 1960, Stonewall Jackson recorded a hit country version of the song. In the 1960s, Jamaican artist Justin Hinds had a ska hit with "Jump Out of the Frying Pan", whose lyrics borrowed heavily from the spiritual. Paul Clayton's version "Pharaoh's Army" appears in 1961's Home-Made Songs & Ballads. Singer James Brown rewrote the lyrics of the original spiritual for his 1964 soul hit with his vocal group the Famous Flames, "Oh Baby Don't You Weep". An a cappella version by Take 6, simply called "Mary", received wide airplay in 1988. The song is sung briefly at the beginning of the music video for Bone Thugs N Harmony's 1996 "Tha Crossroads". It was covered in the Bruce Springsteen with the Seeger Sessions Band Tour. The song also appeared on Mike Farris' 2007 album Salvation in Lights. It appears in The Peter Yarrow Songbook and on the accompanying recorded album, Favorite Folks Songs. Titled as "Don't You Weep, Mary", this song is on the Kingston Trio album Close-Up.

Jazz guitarist Eric Gale made a recording of this song in his 1977 album Multiplication.

A 1988 recording of this song by Sister Thea Bowman, FSPA, was re-released in digital format in 2020 in the digital album, Songs of My People: The Complete Collection.

There was an adaptation "Mairi Mi Lypasai Pia", written and recorded by the Greek songwriter, Manos Xydous, on his 2010 album Otan tha fygo ena vrady apo 'do.

In Denmark, the song was recorded successfully by Four Jacks titled "O Marie, Jeg Vil Hjem Til Dig".

"Mary Don't You Weep"

Single by Prince
- Released: June 7, 2018
- Recorded: 1983

Prince singles chronology
"Nothing Compares 2 U" (2018)	"Mary Don't You Weep" (2018)	"Rock 'n' Roll Is Alive! (And It Lives in Minneapolis)" (2019)

In 2018, a recording of the song by Prince from 1983 was used in the soundtrack of Spike Lee's film BlacKkKlansman. The song later went on to go on his posthumous album, Piano and a Microphone 1983.
