= List of stage names: G =

This list of stage names lists names used by those in the entertainment industry, alphabetically by their stage name's surname (or the best approximation) followed by the given name (or the best approximation) where the surname begins with "G". One-word stage names are presented in List of one-word stage names.

Stage name	Birth name	Life	Notability	Notes
Becky G	Rebbeca Marie Gomez	1997–	American singer and actress	
Bobby G	Robert Alan Gubby	1953–	English singer (Bucks Fizz)	Also known as Bobby Gee
Daddy G	Grantley Evan Marshall	1959–	English musician and DJ (Massive Attack)	
Franky G	Frank Gonzales	1965–	American actor	
Gina G	Gina Gardiner	1970–	Australian singer	
Karol G	Carolina Giraldo Navarro	1991–	Colombian singer and songwriter	
Kenny G	Kenneth Bruce Gorelick	1956–	American jazz musician, composer and producer	
Shock G	Gregory Edward Racker	1963–2021	American rapper and musician (Digital Underground)	Known legally as Gregory Edward Jacobs (adopted stepfather's surname)
Stylo G	Jason Andre McDermott	1985–	British-Jamaican rapper	
Warren G	Warren Griffin III	1970–	American rapper, DJ and producer	
Jean Gabin	Jean-Alexis Moncorgé	1904–1976	French actor	Also known as Jean Gabin Alexis Moncorgé
Gunter Gabriel	Günter Caspelherr	1942–2017	German singer, musician and composer	
John Gabriel	Jack Monkarsh	1931–2021	American actor, singer and producer	
Juan Gabriel	Alberto Aguilera Valadez	1950–2016	Mexican singer, songwriter and actor	Also known as "Juanga" and "El Divo de Juárez"
Madonna Wayne Gacy	Stephen Bier Jr.	1964–	American musician (Marilyn Manson)	Also known as "Pogo"
Josseline Gaël	Jeannine Augustine Jeanne Blanleuil	1917–1995	French actress	
Lady Gaga	Stefani Joanne Angelina Germanotta	1986–	American singer, songwriter and actress	
John Gale	Jun Gallardo	N/A	Filipino film director	
France Gall	Isabelle Geneviève Marie Anne Gall	1947–2018	French singer	
Marisa Galvany	Myra Beth Genis	1936–	American soprano	
Vice Ganda	Jose Marie Borja Viceral	1976–	Filipino comedian, actor and television host	
Robert Gant	Robert Gonzalez	1968–	American actor	
Greta Garbo	Greta Lovisa Gustafsson	1905–1990	Swedish-American actress	
Jean Garcia	Jessica Anne Rodriguez Maitim	1969–	Filipina actress, model and dancer	
Carlos Gardel	Charles Romuald Gardès	1890–1935	French-born Argentine singer, songwriter, composer and actor	
Vincent Gardenia	Vincenzo Scognamiglio	1920/1921–1992	Italian-American actor	
John Garfield	Jacob Julius Garfinkle	1913–1952	American actor	
Beverly Garland	Beverly Fessenden	1926–2008	American actress	
Judy Garland	Frances Gumm	1922–1969	American actress, singer, dancer and vaudevillian	
James Garner	James Bumgarner	1928–2014	American actor	
Brad Garrett	Brad Gerstenfeld	1960–	American comedian and actor	
Leif Garrett	Leif Per Nervik	1961–	American singer and actor	
Snuff Garrett	Thomas Garrett	1938–2015	American record producer	
Spencer Garrett	Spencer Garrett Heckenkamp	1963–	American actor	
David Garrick	Philip Core	1945–2013	English singer	
Martin Garrix	Martijn Garritsen	1996–	Dutch DJ and record producer	
Willie Garson	Willie Garson Paszamant	1964–2021	American actor	
Green Gartside	Paul Strohmeyer	1955–	Welsh songwriter, singer and musician (Scritti Politti)	
John Gary	John Gary Strader	1932–1998	American singer and television personality	
Linda Gary	Linda Gary Dewoskin	1944–1995	American actress	
Lorraine Gary	Lorraine Gottfield	1937–	American actress	
Kevin Gates	Kevin Gilyard	1986–	American rapper	
Synyster Gates	Brian Haner Jr.	1981–	American musician (Avenged Sevenfold)	Also known as Syn
Mark Gaumont	Mark Ryan	1959–2011	English musician (Adam and the Ants)	
Gene Gauntier	Genevieve Liggett	1885–1966	American screenwriter and actress	
Cassandra Gava	Cassandra Gaviola	1959–	American actress and producer	
William Gaxton	Arturo Gaxiola	1893–1963	American actor	
Git Gay	Birgit Holmberg	1921–2007	Swedish director, actress and singer	
Maria Gay	Maria de Lourdes Lucia Antonia Pichot Gironés	1876–1943	Spanish opera singer	
Lisa Gaye	Leslie Gaye Griffin	1935–2016	American actress and dancer	
Crystal Gayle	Brenda Gail Webb	1951–	American country singer	
Jackie Gayle	Jack Potovsky	1926–2002	American comedian and actor	
Ronnie Gaylord	Ronald Fredianelli	1930–2004	American musician, songwriter, and comedian	
George Gaynes	George Jongejans	1917–2016	Finnish-American singer and actor	
Gloria Gaynor	Gloria Fowles	1943–	American singer	
Mitzi Gaynor	Francesca Marlene de Czanyi von Gerber	1931–2024	American actress, singer and dancer	
Eunice Gayson	Eunice Elizabeth Sargaison	1928–2018	English actress	
Franky Gee	Francisco Alejandro Gutierrez	1962–2005	Cuban-American singer, rapper and soldier	
Master Gee	Guy O'Brien	1962–	American hip hop artist	
Will Geer	William Ghere	1902–1978	American actor, musician and social activist	
Gidget Gein	Bradley Stewart	1969–2008	American musician and artist (Marilyn Manson)	
Rhoda Gemignani	Rhoda Barbara Cohan	1939–	American actress	
Adeline Genée	Anina Jensen	1878–1970	Danish-British ballet dancer	
Johnny Gentle	John Askew	1936–2024	English singer	Known as Darren Young in his later career
Bobbie Gentry	Roberta Streeter	1942–	American retired singer-songwriter	
Anthony George	Ottavio Gabriel George	1921–2005	American actor	
Boy George	George Alan O'Dowd	1961–	English singer, songwriter and DJ (Culture Club)	
Cassietta George	Casietta Baker	1929–1995	American gospel singer and composer	
Gladys George	Gladys Clare Evans	1904–1954	American actress	
John George	Tufei Filthela	1898–1968	Syrian-American actor	
Peggy George	Margaret de Mille	c. 1908–1978	American actress	
Screaming Mad George	Joji Tani	1956–	Japanese special effects artist, film director and former musician	
Wally George	George Walter Pearch	1931–2003	American radio and television commentator	
Carl Gerard	Carl Gerhard Petersen	1885–1966	Danish-American actor	
Danyel Gérard	Gérard Daniel Kherlakian	1939–	French pop singer and composer	
Zinovy Gerdt	Zalmnan Khrapinovich	1916–1996	Russian actor	
Ashlyn Gere	Kimberly Ashlyn McKamy	1959–	American pornographic actress	
Little Gerhard	Karl-Gerhard Lundkvist	1934–2026	Swedish singer	
Gene Gerrard	Eugene O'Sullivan	1892–1971	English actor	
Lisa Gerritsen	Lisa Orszag	1957–	American child actress	
Ira Gershwin	Israel Gershowitz	1896–1983	American lyricist	
Valeska Gert	Gertrud Valesca Samosch	1892–1978	German dancer and actress	
Stan Getz	Stan Gayetsky	1927–1991	American jazz musician	
Tamara Geva	Tamara Zheverzheieva	1907–1997	Russian-American actress, dancer and choreographer	
Georgia Gibbs	Frieda Lipschitz	1918–2006	American singer and entertainer	
Marla Gibbs	Margaret Bradley	1931–	American actress	
Terry Gibbs	Julius Gubenko	1924–	American jazz musician and bandleader	
Henry Gibson	James Bateman	1935–2009	American actor, comedian and poet	
Julie Gibson	Gladys Soray	1913–2019	American singer and actress	
Virginia Gibson	Virginia Gorski	1925–2013	American dancer, singer and actress	
Billy Gilbert	William Gilbert Barron	1894–1971	American comedian and actor	
Irene Gilbert	Irene Liebeschutz	1934–2011	German-American actress and director	
John Gilbert	John Pringle	1897–1936	American actor, screenwriter and director	
Paul Gilbert	Ed MacMahon	1918–1976	American actor	
Sara Gilbert	Sara Abeles	1975–	American actress	
Astrud Gilberto	Astrud Evangelina Weinert	1940–2023	Brazilian singer	
Rex Gildo	Ludwig Hirtreiter	1936–1999	German singer	
Jack Gilford	Jacob Gellman	1908–1990	American actor	
Aidan Gillen	Aidan Murphy	1967/1968–	Irish actor	
Anita Gillette	Anita Luebben	1936–	American actress and singer	
Jean Gillie	Jean Coomber	1915–1949	English actress	
Ann Gillis	Alma Mabel Conner	1927–2018	American actress	
Jamie Gillis	Jamey Ira Gurman	1943–2010	American pornographic actor	
Gail Gilmore	Gail Gerber	1937–2014	Canadian actress	Also known as Gail Gibson
Virginia Gilmore	Sherman Virginia Poole	1919–1986	American actress	
Amos Gitai	Amos Weinraub	1950–	Israeli filmmaker	
Christine Glanville	Nancy Christine Fletcher	1924–1999	English puppeteer	
Jackie Gleason	Herbert Walton Gleason Jr.	1916–1987	American actor, comedian, writer and composer	
Peter Glenville	Peter Patrick Brabazon Browne	1913–1996	English actor and director	
Gary Glitter	Paul Francis Gadd	1944–	English former singer	
Marie Glory	Raymonde Toully	1905–2009	French actress	
Alma Gluck	Reba Feinsohn	1884–1938	Romanian-American soprano	
Blanche Glynne	Blanche Aitken	1893–1946	Welsh actress	
Jón Gnarr	Jón Gunnar Kristinsson	1967–	Icelandic actor, comedian and politician	
Liza Goddard	Louise Elizabeth Goddard	1950–	English actress	
Eyal Golan	Eyal Bitton	1971–	Israeli singer	
Ernest Gold	Ernst Sigmund Goldner	1921–1999	Austrian-American composer	
Whoopi Goldberg	Caryn Johnson	1955–	American actress, comedienne, author and television personality	
Samuel Goldwyn	Szmuel Gelbfisz	1882–1974	Polish-American film producer	Also known as Samuel Goldfish
Typist Gopu	Gopalarathinam	1933/1934–2019	Indian actor	
C. Henry Gordon	Henry Racke	1883–1940	American actor	
Don Gordon	Donald Guadagno	1926–2017	American actor	
Ruth Gordon	Ruth Gordon Jones	1896–1985	American actress, screenwriter and playwright	
Charles Gordone	Charles Fleming	1925–1995	American playwright, actor and director	
Lesley Gore	Lesley Goldstein	1946–2015	American singer and songwriter	
Mel Gorham	Marilyn Schnaer	1959–	American actress	
Eydie Gormé	Edith Gormezano	1928–2013	American singer	
Rita Gorr	Marguerite Geirnaert	1926–2012	Belgian opera singer	
Irv Gotti	Irving Lorenzo Jr.	1970–2025	American DJ and record producer	
Jetta Goudal	Juliette Goudeket	1891–1985	Dutch-American actress	
Paulo Goulart	Paulo Afonso Miessa	1933–2014	Brazilian actor	
Elliott Gould	Elliott Goldstein	1938–	American actor	
Harold Gould	Harold Goldstein	1923–2010	American character actor	
La Goulue	Louise Weber	1866–1929	French dancer	
Chantal Goya	Chantal de Guerre	1942–	French singer and actress	
Armando Goyena	Jose Revilla	1922–2011	Filipino actor	
Leslie Grace	Leslie Grace Martínez	1995–	American singer, songwriter and actress	
Maggie Grace	Margaret Grace Denig	1983–	American actress and model	
Mckenna Grace	Mckenna Grace Burge	2006–	American actress and singer	
Don Grady	Don Louis Agrati	1944–2012	American actor and musician	
Bill Graham	Wulf Grajonca	1931–1991	German-American promoter	
Eve Graham	Evelyn May Beatson	1943–	Scottish retired singer (The New Seekers)	
T. Max Graham	Neil Graham Moran	1941–2011	American actor	
Gloria Grahame	Gloria Penelope Hallward	1923–1981	American actress	
Margot Grahame	Margaret Clark	1911–1982	English actress	
Lou Gramm	Louis Andrew Grammatico	1950–	American singer-songwriter (Foreigner)	
Angry Grandpa	Charles Green Jr.	1950–2017	American YouTuber	
Stewart Granger	James Lablache Stewart	1913–1993	English actor	
Cary Grant	Archibald Alec Leach	1904–1986	English-American actor	
Faye Grant	Faye Elizabeth Yoe	1957–	American actress	
Gogi Grant	Myrtle Audrey Arinsberg	1924–2016	American pop singer	
Kathryn Grant	Olive Kathryn Grandstaff	1933–	American actress and singer	Also known as Kathryn Grandstaff
Kirby Grant	Kirby Grant Hoon Jr.	1911–1985	American actor	
Lee Grant	Lyova Haskell Rosenthal	Disputed YOB	American actress and director	
Mr. Lee Grant	Bogdan Kominowski	1945–	New Zealand singer and actor	
Rachel Grant	Rachel Louise Grant DeLongueuil	1977–	English actress and television presenter	
Richard E. Grant	Richard Grant Esterhuysen	1957–	Swazi-English actor and presenter	
Shauna Grant	Colleen Applegate	1963–1984	American pornographic actress and model	
Shelby Grant	Brenda Thompson	1936–2011	American actress	
Don Grashey	Dominic Guarasci	1925–2005	Canadian songwriter and music producer	
Steve Gravers	Solomon Gottlieb	1922–1978	American character actor	
Michale Graves	Michael Emanuel	1975–	American singer (Misfits)	
Ralph Graves	Ralph Horsburgh	1900–1977	American screenwriter, film director and actor	
Wavy Gravy	Hugh Nanton Romney Jr.	1936–	American entertainer and peace activist	
Beatrice Gray	Bertrice Kimbrough	1911–2009	American actress and dancer	
Coleen Gray	Doris Jensen	1922–2015	American actress	
Dobie Gray	Lawrence Brown	1940–2011	American singer and songwriter	
Dorian Gray	Maria Mangini	1928–2011	Italian actress	
Dulcie Gray	Dulcie Bailey	1915–2011	English actress and writer	
Gilda Gray	Marianna Michalska	1901–1959	Polish-American dancer and actress	
Jason Gray	Jason Jeffrey Gay	1972–	American singer-songwriter	
Jerry Gray	Generoso Graziano	1915–1976	American musician, arranger, composer and bandleader	
Macy Gray	Natalie Renée McIntyre	1967–	American singer and actress	
Rose Gray	Rosie May Hudson-Edmonds	1996–	English singer and songwriter	
Sally Gray	Constance Stevens	1915–2006	English actress	
Ugly Dave Gray	Graham David Taylor	1933–	English-Australian actor, comedian and television personality	
Vivean Gray	Jean Vivra Gray	1924–2016	English actress	
Perlita Greco	Alfonsina Grecco Constantini	1906–2001	Argentine-American actress and singer	
CeeLo Green	Thomas DeCarlo Callaway	1975–	American singer, songwriter, rapper, record producer and actor	
Mitzi Green	Elizabeth Keno	1920–1969	American child actress and singer	
Peter Green	Peter Allen Greenbaum	1946–2020	English singer-songwriter and guitarist (Fleetwood Mac)	
Shecky Greene	Fred Sheldon Greenfield	1926–2023	American comedian and actor	
Judy Greer	Judith Therese Evans	1975–	American actress	
Julie Gregg	Beverly Scalzo	1937–2016	American actress	
Stella Greka	Styliani Lagada	1922–2025	Greek singer and actress	
Anne Grey	Aileen Ewing	1907–1987	English actress	
Gloria Grey	Maria Draga	1909–1947	American actress	
Joel Grey	Joel Katz	1932–	American actor, singer, dancer, photographer and director	
Kaiti Grey	Athanasia Gizili	1924–2025	Greek actress and singer	
Lita Grey	Lillita MacMurray	1908–1995	American actress	
Nan Grey	Eschal Loleet Grey Miller	1918–1993	American actress	
Olga Grey	Anna Zacsek	1896–1973	American actress	
Professor Griff	Richard Griffin	1960–	American rapper (Public Enemy)	
Ethel Griffies	Ethel Woods	1878–1975	English actress	
Bessie Griffin	Arlette Broil	1922–1989	American gospel singer	
Kenneth Griffith	Kenneth Griffiths	1921–2006	Welsh actor and filmmaker	
Maribel Guardia	Maribel Fernandez Garcia	1959–	Costa Rican actress and singer	
Val Guest	Valmond Grossman	1911–2006	English film director and screenwriter	
Robert Guillaume	Robert Peter Williams	1927–2017	American actor and singer	
Bonnie Guitar	Bonnie Buckingham	1923–2019	American singer, musician and producer	
Aliza Gur	Alizia Gross	1940–	Israeli actress	
Billy Guy	Frank Phillips Jr.	1936–2002	American singer (The Coasters)	
Guitar Guy	Brian Haner	1958–	American musician and comedian	
Edmund Gwenn	Edmund John Kellaway	1877–1959	English actor	
Anne Gwynne	Marguerite Gwynne Trice	1918–2003	American actress	
Bad Gyal	Alba Farelo Solé	1997–	Spanish singer and songwriter	
Doc Gynéco	Bruno Beausir	1974–	French musician	
Greta Gynt	Margrethe Woxholt	1916–2000	Norwegian dancer and actress	
