= Sound of Gospel =

American record company

Sound Of Gospel Records
- Parent company: Nine Records
- Founded: 1969; 57 years ago
- Founder: Armen Boladian
- Status: Active
- Distributor: Nine Records
- Genre: Gospel
- Country of origin: United States
- Location: Detroit, Michigan

Sound of Gospel Records was founded in Detroit, Michigan, United States in 1969 by Armen Boladian. It is a gospel subsidiary record label of Westbound Records, where Boladian was also its former president.

Sound of Gospel signed up well-known gospel music acts including Mattie Moss Clark, The Clark Sisters, Voices of Tabernacle, Jerry Q. Parries, Yolanda Adams, Thomas Whitfield, and Rev. James Moore. The label also signed Esther Smith and the Youth IV Christ Fellowship Mass Choir. Pastor and church organist, the late Rev. Charles Nicks, Jr., and the St. James Adult Choir also signed up with the label, and released albums like Hold Back the Night.

== Artist roster (past and present) ==
This is a list of artists, past and present, who have recorded albums for Sound of Gospel Records over the past few decades.

- The voices of tabernacle
- The Clark Sisters (1976–1982)
- The New Jerusalem Baptist Church Mass Choir
- Esther Smith
- Rev. Charles Nicks Jr. & The St. James Adult Choir
- Kenneth Ward & The Southwest Mass Choir
- Galilee Mass Choir
- Ruth Busbee
- Thomas Whitfield
- Rev. Charles O. Miles
- The B.L.& S. Singers
- Andre Woods & Chosen
- Michael Johnson
- Rev. Donald Vails & the Choraleers
- The Bright Star Male Chorus
- Yolanda Adams
- Jerome L. Ferrell
- Greater Cleveland Choral Chapter
- Rev. Dr. George A. Copeland & The United Faith Church of Deliverance Mass Choir
- Mattie Moss Clark
- International Gospel Center's Voices of Deliverance
- Joy
- Wolverine State Baptist Mass Choir
- Rev. James Moore
- Wanda Nero Butler
- Thomas Butler
- Youth IV Christ Fellowship Mass Choir
- Jerry Q. Parries & The Christian Family Choir
- Herman Harris & Voices of Faith, Hope & Love
- Texas Mass Choir of the GMWA
- Voices of Heaven
- D.K. Craig & Voices of Tabernacle
- Harold Sutton
- B. J. Fears & the L.I.F.E. Choir
- Anthony Whigham
- John W. Griggs
- Atlanta Philharmonic Chorale
- Timothy Wright
- Lighthouse Inter-Denominational Choir
- F.A.M.E. Freedom Choir
- Charles G. Hayes
- Cosmopolitan Church of Prayer Choir
- James Cleveland
- Arvis Strickling-Jones
- Michigan State Community Choir
- Anthony Whigham
- Rev. Walter Richardson
- Vincent Manyweather
- Helen Stephens
- The Northern California Chapter of GMWA
- Youth IV Christ Fellowship Mass Choir
- Salvation Corporation
- Oscar Hayes
- Darius Brooks

== Hit songs ==
"You Brought The Sunshine", by the Clark Sisters, became a national hit.
