= Cedric Ford =

- Also known as: Minister Cedric Ford
- Born: Cedric LeVance Ford; September 28, 1968 (age 57); Chicago, Illinois
- Origin: Houston, Texas
- Genres: Gospel, traditional black gospel, urban contemporary gospel
- Occupations: Singer, songwriter
- Instruments: Vocals, singer-songwriter,
- Years active: 2000–present
- Labels: Muscle Shoals, Tyscot
- Website: cedricford.com

Minister Cedric LeVance Ford (born September 28, 1968) is an American gospel musician and leader of Worship Unlimited, currently based out of Houston, Texas because he is the music minister at Reflections of Christ Church. His first album, Featuring Visions: A Choral Ministry, was released by Muscle Shoals Records in 2000, and produced by Dorothy Norwood. He released, Created 2 Worship, with Tyscot Records in 2009, and this was a Billboard magazine breakthrough release upon the Gospel Albums chart at number 34. He was nominated for an NAACP Theatre Award for his role in The Fabric of a Man by David E. Talbert.

== Early life ==
Ford was born on September 28, 1968, in Chicago, Illinois, as Cedric LeVance Ford, whose father is Elder Collin Ford and mother Emma J. Ford.

== Music career ==
His music recording career commenced in 2000, with the release of Featuring Visions: A Choral Ministry by Muscle Shoals Records on February 1, 2000, and it was produced by Dorothy Norwood. The subsequent album, Created 2 Worship, was released on May 5, 2009, by Tyscot Records, and this was his breakthrough released upon the Billboard magazine Gospel Albums chart at No. 34.

== Theatre career ==
Ford was in The Fabric of a Man by David E. Talbert, and he was nominated for an NAACP Theatre Award because of his performance.

== Discography ==
List of selected studio albums, with selected chart positions
Title	Album details	Peak chart positions
Title	Album details	US Gos
Featuring Visions: A Choral Ministry	Released: February 1, 2000; Label: Muscle Shoals; CD, digital download	–
Created 2 Worship	Released: May 5, 2009; Label: Tyscot; CD, digital download	34
