= James Cleveland =

American gospel singer, musician and composer (1931–1991)

The Reverend James Cleveland
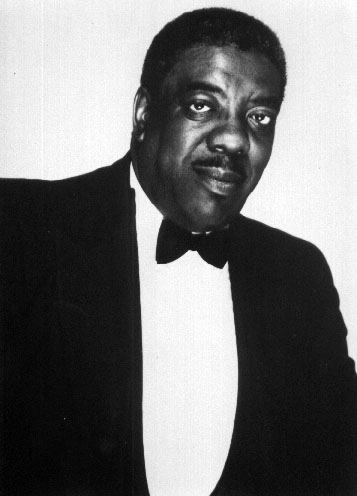

Background information
- Born: James Edward Cleveland; December 5, 1931; Chicago, Illinois, U.S.
- Died: February 9, 1991 (aged 59) Culver City, California, U.S.
- Genres: Gospel; traditional black gospel; urban contemporary gospel; soul music
- Occupations: Singer; musician; composer; arranger; recording artist; performer; music minister
- Instruments: Vocals, piano
- Labels: Byg, Gamble and Huff, HOB, HRB Music Company, King James, Musidisc, Nashboro, Phoenix, Savoy, Sonorous, Soul Parade, States, Thunderbird, UpFront

James Edward Cleveland (December 5, 1931 – February 9, 1991) was an American gospel singer, musician, and composer. Known as the "King of Gospel", Cleveland was a driving force behind the creation of the modern gospel sound by incorporating traditional black gospel, soul, pop, and jazz in arrangements for mass choirs.

Throughout his career, Cleveland appeared on hundreds of recordings and earned four Grammy Awards. He was the first gospel musician to earn a star on the Hollywood Walk of Fame. He was inducted into the Gospel Music Hall of Fame in 1984. For his trailblazing accomplishments, he is regarded by many as one of the greatest gospel singers who ever lived.

His best known recordings include "Lord, Help Me to Hold Out", "Peace Be Still", "I Don't Feel No Ways Tired", “Where Is Your Faith", "The Love of God", "God Has Smiled on Me", and "Jesus Is the Best Thing That Ever Happened to Me."

== Early life and career ==
Born in Chicago, Cleveland began singing as a boy soprano at Pilgrim Baptist Church where Thomas A. Dorsey was minister of music and Roberta Martin was pianist for the choir. He strained his vocal cords as a teenager while part of a local gospel group; this was said to contribute to the distinctive, gravelly voice which became a hallmark of his later in his career.

As a teenager, Cleveland was a part of a missionary group, Soul Winners for Christ which was created by his teenage friend Jessie Jimerson Phillips. Phillips would go on in later years to write Roberta Martin's last recorded song, "I Have Hope". Soul Winners for Christ also included a young Richard D. Henton and was headquartered at Chicago's Greater Harvest Baptist Church; Louis H. Boddie was pastor. The change in his voice led Cleveland to focus on his skills as a pianist, and later as a composer and arranger. Also produced and co wrote songs with Aretha Franklin for her multi award and multi million sales best selling album Amazing Grace. With songs that included "Precious Memories", "God will take care of you" and "Mary Don't You Weep".

== Musical career ==
=== The Gospelaires ===
In 1950, Cleveland joined the Gospelaires, a trio led by Norsalus McKissick and Bessie Folk. His arrangements modernized such traditional standards as "(Give Me That) Old Time Religion" and "It's Me, O Lord". After the trio disbanded, an associate of the group, Roberta Martin, hired him as a composer and arranger. The song that brought Cleveland tremendous fame was his rendition of "Peace Be Still".

=== Albertina Walker & The Caravans ===
Cleveland went to work with childhood friend Albertina Walker, founder of The Caravans, as a composer, arranger, pianist, and occasional singer as well as a narrator.

The Caravans became the launching pad for today's gospel legends. Besides Cleveland, the group counted among its membership several gospel luminaries including Shirley Caesar, known as the First Lady of Gospel; Cassietta George, who co-wrote some of the group's best hits; Delores Washington; Josephine Howard, mother to R&B artist Miki Howard; Inez Andrews, whose song "Mary, Don't You Weep" became a staple in the industry; Dorothy Norwood, known as Gospel's Greatest Storyteller; James Heron; Loleatta Holloway, who became a legendary dance recording artist in the late 1970s; and several others.

In November 1954, Walker provided Cleveland the opportunity to do his very first recording. By staying out of the studio for a while, she convinced States Records to allow him to record with her group. He continued to record with The Caravans until States closed down in 1957. Cleveland would later reunite with Walker in the late 1970s with two album releases: Reunion, released in 1977, and the iconic classic Please Be Patient With Me, released in 1979 with the Trinity All Nations Choir of Chicago. This album earned Walker her first gold record.

In 1959, he recorded a version of Ray Charles' hit "Hallelujah, I Love Her So" as a solo artist. By 1960, Cleveland, who had incorporated blues riffs in his work – and what Anthony Heilbut described as "sheer funkiness" – had become associated with a new tenor in gospel music. He became known by more than just the professionals within gospel music with his version of the Soul Stirrers' song, "The Love of God", backed by the Voices of Tabernacle from Detroit. The success and sensation of the song's recording led to a record contract with Savoy Records that would change his life forever.

=== Savoy Records ===
James Cleveland signed with the historic jazz label Savoy Records in 1962, going on to release a huge catalog of soul gospel recordings from that year until his death in 1991, many of which were recorded in a live concert setting. The live concert recording staple started with Reverend Lawrence Roberts, pastor of the First Baptist Church in Nutley, New Jersey, home of the famous Angelic Choir. Roberts liked the idea of capturing worship in song live on a recording where the listeners can feel and become of a part of the service. Working with Savoy's executive producer Fred Mendelsohn, Cleveland and the Angelic Choir of Nutley released two albums before recording the iconic masterpiece, Peace Be Still, in September 1963, which sold thousands of copies at that time and garnered Cleveland his first gold album. Peace Be Still also stayed on the Billboard charts for at least fifteen years after its release.

=== The Cleveland Singers ===
Cleveland moved to Los Angeles to become Minister of Music at Grace Memorial Church of God in Christ, where he attained even greater popularity working with keyboardist Billy Preston and the Angelic Choir of Nutley, New Jersey. He returned to touring with the newly organized James Cleveland Singers, which included Odessa McCastle, Georgia White, Eugene Bryant, and Billy Preston, among others. In 1964, Cleveland re-organized The James Cleveland Singers, which included Odessa McCastle, Roger Roberts, and Gene Viale (who was the first Latin-American to integrate soul gospel and sing with the Cleveland Singers).

In 1965, Cleveland added Clyde Brown and Charles Barnett to his group, which by then was traveling extensively throughout the United States and abroad into the late 1960s, performing in all major venues. This collaboration produced such recordings as "Heaven That Will Be Good Enough For Me", "Two Wings", and "The Lord Is Blessing Me Right Now".

Other singers were added in later years, including Marva Hines and renowned soprano soloist, Cleo Kennedy. They were mainstays until Cleveland's death in 1991.

=== The Southern California Community Choir ===
Cleveland capitalized on his success by founding his own choir, the Southern California Community Choir. After being nominated numerous times in previous years, James won his first Grammy Award with the Southern California Community Choir in 1975, for his 1974 album, In the Ghetto.

He recorded several albums with SCC between the years of 1970 and 1990. Their most successful albums were the 1979 Grammy-nominated release, It's a New Day, featuring the industry's signature staple, "God Is"; and their 1981 release, Where Is Your Faith; among many others. His final Grammy Award was issued posthumously after his passing in 1991, for his final album with SCC, Having Church, which features Cleveland's iconic rendition of Tramaine Hawkins' signature "What Shall I Do?", written and composed by Quincy Fielding.

=== Cornerstone Institutional Baptist Church ===
In November 1970, Cleveland founded his own ministry and church, Cornerstone Institutional Baptist Church, in Los Angeles which grew from ten to thousands of members throughout the remainder of his life. His first album with the church choir, The Voices of Cornerstone, was released in 1980, which featured a rendition by Cleveland of "Jesus, Lover of My Soul", and the title track, "A Praying Spirit", written by Elbernita "Twinkie" Clark and recorded by The Clark Sisters. The church choir's second album, My Expectations, was released in 1981 to moderate acclaim. By the time of his death the church membership was over 7,000.

=== James Cleveland Presents ===
From the 1970s until 1990, Cleveland would bring together a number of artists to back him on appearances and records. He also continued to introduce, appear, and record with some of the most notable gospel choirs and independent artists of the time – many of whom became legends in their own right including The Donald Vails Choraleers (Detroit); The Harold Smith Majestics, with whom he recorded the classic "Lord, Help Me to Hold Out"; The Los Angeles Gospel Messengers, the last choir to record with Cleveland before he passed; New Jerusalem Baptist Church Choir from Flint, Michigan; Henry Jackson; The Craig Brothers; The Salem Inspirational Choir from Omaha, Nebraska, with whom he recorded the iconic staple "I Don't Feel Noways Tired"; Richard "Mr. Clean" White; Bishop Albert Jamison & the Triboro Mass Choir; Issac Whittmon; Marva Hines; Debbie Austin; The Fourth of May; Quentella Caldwell; Sara Jordan Powell; The Philadelphia Mass Choir; The Houston Mass Choir; The New Jersey Mass Choir; and the award-winning Charles Fold Singers, from Cincinnati, Ohio, with whom Cleveland recorded five albums, including the Grammy-winning 1979 release, Make Me an Instrument.

Additionally, Cleveland himself backed other acts, contributing to the recordings of well-known artists such as Aretha Franklin, Ray Charles, and Elton John.

=== Aretha Franklin's Amazing Grace ===
Cleveland also moved to Detroit in the 1960s to take a position as music director at the famed New Bethel Baptist Church, where C. L. Franklin, father of the Queen of Soul, Aretha Franklin, was pastor. In 1972, James collaborated with Aretha on her historic Grammy-winning and multi-million-selling album Amazing Grace, which is known as the Greatest Gospel Album of All Time. Recorded live at the New Temple Missionary Baptist Church in Watts in Los Angeles, with his Southern California Community Choir, his feature on the album and Aretha's success as a pop artist made the album a historic landmark in gospel, and is still selling to this day, with a special CD re-release of The Complete Recordings (the unedited album recording session of the Amazing Grace project).

This historic recording was also filmed by director Sydney Pollack for an intended documentary release, but due to a technical issue of not using a clapperboard to synchronize the audio with the video, the film was deemed unusable, and was left shelved for the next 47 years. Before he died, Pollack authorized producer Alan Elliott to try to complete the film. Initially unaware of the sound synchronization problem, Elliot mortgaged his own house to buy the film negative from Warner Brothers, but was able to use modern technology to bring audio and video together successfully. The completed documentary was finally released in April 2019, playing in select theaters across the world, with a premier at the New Temple Missionary Baptist Church itself.

=== Gospel: The Motion Picture ===
The historic documentary film Gospel, released in 1983, features James Cleveland for the first time on the motion picture screen, along with the Southern California Community Choir, Walter Hawkins & the Family, The Mighty Clouds of Joy, Shirley Caesar, and The Clark Sisters. The film was directed by David Leivick and Frederick A. Ritzenberg. Excerpts from the film soundtrack was released on Savoy Records and became a top seller, with Cleveland having the majority feature on side two of the album.

== Gospel Music Workshop of America ==
In 1968, Cleveland taught others how to achieve the modern gospel sound and preserve the industry's rich legacy through his annual workshop convention, The Gospel Music Workshop of America (GMWA), an organization that he co-founded with Albertina Walker and which now has over 150 chapters with 30,000 members. The GMWA has featured and produced the likes of Donald Vails, Issac Douglas, Myrna Summers, Harold Ivory Williams Jr., Sara Jordan Powell, Daryl Coley, John P. Kee, Kirk Franklin, Kurt Carr, Donald Lawrence, and Yolanda Adams. The purpose of the workshop was to bring together singers from all over the country in order to perpetuate the art of gospel music. The workshops eventually attracted thousands of adherents and laid the groundwork for the popularity of gospel music. The last album Cleveland recorded with the GMWA was their 1990 release from the previous year's annual convention in New Orleans.

== Gospel renditions of pop songs ==
Throughout his recording career, Cleveland started a trend and was famously known for taking some of the greatest pop, R&B, and soul songs and transforming them into gospel anthems. Out of all the mainstream pop songs he rearranged for gospel audiences, his most memorable is his classic rendition of Gladys Knight & the Pips' "You're the Best Thing That Ever Happened to Me," which he changed to "Jesus Is the Best Thing That Ever Happened to Me." This rendition earned him a Grammy nomination when it was released in 1975 as his first recording with the Charles Fold Singers of Cincinnati, Ohio. Another memorable gospel rendition was of Barry Manilow's "I Write the Songs," which he recorded on his 1977 Grammy-winning album, Live at Carnegie Hall. The last song rendition he presented was Whitney Houston's "Didn't We Almost Have It All," known as "Aren't You Glad You Know the Lord," which Cleveland recorded in 1989 with the Northern and Southern California Choirs of the GMWA on the album Breathe on Me, featuring Daryl Coley and current Savoy Records executive producer Milton Biggham.

== Discography ==
- Out On A Hill (1961)
- Peace Be Still (1962)
- There Is No Failure In God (1962)
- This Sunday In Person (1962)
- Volume II (1962)
- The Soul of James Cleveland (1962)
- I Stood On the Banks of the Jordan (1963)
- The Sun Will Shine After Awhile (1964)
- Heaven, That's Good Enough For Me (1964)
- Give Me My Flowers (1965)
- James Cleveland Sings Songs Of Dedication (1965)
- He Leadeth Me (1965)
- The Grace Of God (1966)
- In Hollywood (1966)
- I Walk With God (1967)
- Volume 7 (1967)
- Songs My Mother Taught Me (1967)
- James Cleveland And The Cleveland Singers (1967)
- James Cleveland And The Cleveland Singers (1968)
- Sing In Memory Of Rev. Charles A. Craig (1968)
- Volume 8 Part 1 (1968)
- Volume 8 Part 2 (1968)
- James Cleveland And The Voices Of Tabernacle (1968)
- Where Can I Go (1968)
- God's Promise (1969)
- See About Me (1969)
- Psalm #134 (1969)
- I'm One Of Them (1969)
- The One And Only James Cleveland (1970)
- Amazing Grace (1970)
- God Specializes (1970)
- Give Me A Clean Heart (1970)
- James Cleveland With Hulah Gene And Her Daughter Carolyne (1972)
- I'll Do His Will (1972)
- Trust In God (1972)
- Live In Los Angeles, California (1972)
- Down Memory Lane (1973)
- Live In Chicago, Illinois (1973)
- In The Ghetto (1974)
- All You Need (1974)
- God Has Smiled On Me (1974)
- To The Glory Of God (1974)
- Jesus Is The Best Thing That Ever Happened To Me (1975)
- James Cleveland Sings With The Greatest Gospel Star Parade (1975)
- Give It To Me (1976)
- Live At Carnegie Hall (1977)
- The Lord Is My Life (1977)
- James Cleveland Presents the Salem Inspirational Choir (1978)
- Everything Will Be Alright (1978)
- Think Of His Goodness To You (1979)
- The Promise (1979)
- In God's Own Time, My Change Will Come (1979)
- Victory Shall Be Mine (1979)
- It's A New Day (1979)
- Let Me Be An Instrument (1979)
- A Praying Spirit (1980)
- 20th Anniversary Album (1980)
- Where Is Your Faith (1981)
- God's Way Is The Best Way (1981)
- I Want To Be Ready When You Come (1981)
- Recorded Live (1981)
- Lord, From The Depths Of My Heart (1982)
- James Cleveland And The Cleveland Singers (1982)
- Soon I Will Be Done With the Troubles of the World (1982)
- Sunday Morning (1983)
- Hallelujah 'Tis Done (1983)
- James Cleveland Sings With The World's Greatest Gospel Stars (1983)
- This Too Will Pass (1983)
- For The Prize (1983)
- I'm Giving My Life Up To You (1983)
- Christ Is The Answer (1983)
- Recorded Live At Symphony Hall In Newark, N.J. (1984)
- Live In Atlanta, GA (1985)
- James Cleveland Sings With The World's Greatest Choirs (1985)
- James Cleveland Sings Songs Of Dedication Reissue (1986)
- Merry Christmas (1987)
- Breathe On Me (1989)
- Having Church (1990)
- A Tribute to the King (1991)
- James Cleveland and the L.A. Gospel Messengers (1991)
- The Best Of Rev. James Cleveland And The GMWA (1993)
- Rev. Albert Jamison Presents Rev. James Cleveland & the Legends GMWA Live (1998)
- Standing in the Need of a Blessing (2000)
- Behind the Curtain (2001)

== Death ==
On February 9, 1991, James Cleveland died in Culver City, California. He was 59. Some reports list the cause of death as congestive heart failure, stating that the singer had fallen into a coma shortly before his death. Over 8,000 people gathered for his funeral service at the Shrine Auditorium in Los Angeles. He is interred at Inglewood Park Cemetery in Inglewood, California.

== Controversy ==
=== Estate and inheritance matters ===
Following Cleveland's death in February 1991, a number of controversies arose surrounding his estate, which at the time was estimated to be worth between $4 and $6 million.

==== Andre M. Cleveland ====
In October 1991, music producer Andre M. Cleveland (then aged 34) filed suit against James Cleveland's estate, claiming to be Cleveland's adopted son.

==== Jean Ervin/LaShone Cleveland ====
Also in October 1991, Jean Ervin, a member of the Cleveland-founded Cornerstone Institutional Baptist Church, claimed that she was the mother of Cleveland's only biological child, daughter LaShone Cleveland (b. 1965). Ervin also said that she believed that Andre M. Cleveland was not adopted as he claimed, but was merely one of the many "homeless" children that the late-singer took into his home over the years.

=== Abuse and infection allegations by Christopher Harris ===
In February 1992, Cleveland's then-foster son, Christopher Harris (formerly Christopher Harris Cleveland), filed a lawsuit against Cleveland's estate, claiming that Cleveland allegedly sexually abused him over a period of five years and infected him with the HIV virus, which he claims Cleveland contracted through same-sex liaisons. The case was settled with undisclosed terms. According to Heilbut (2012), Cleveland was widely recognized as gay in the gospel circuit.

== Awards and nominations ==
=== Dove Awards ===
The Dove Awards are awarded annually by the Gospel Music Association. Cleveland has been inducted into the Hall of Fame and has also earned 1 award and from 5 nominations.

Year	Award	Nominated work	Result
1980	Soul/Black Gospel Album of the Year	It's a New Day	Nominated
1981	Traditional Black Gospel Album of the Year	A Praying Spirit	Nominated
1982	Traditional Black Gospel Album of the Year	Where Is Your Faith	Nominated
1983	Traditional Black Gospel Album of the Year	James Cleveland & The Cleveland Singers	Nominated
1984	Gospel Music Hall of Fame	Himself	Inducted
2006	Southern Gospel Recorded Song of the Year	"Longs As I Got King Jesus" (as songwriter)	Won

=== Grammy Awards ===
The Grammy Awards are awarded annually by the National Academy of Recording Arts and Sciences. Cleveland has earned 4 awards from 29 nominations.

Year	Award	Nominated work	Result
1965	Best Gospel or Other Religious Recording	"Standin' On The Banks Of The River"	Nominated
1969	Best Soul Gospel Performance	"Bread of Heaven, Parts 1 and 2"	Nominated
1970	Best Soul Gospel Performance	"Come On And See About Me"	Nominated
1971	Best Soul Gospel Performance	"Amazing Grace"	Nominated
1973	Best Soul Gospel Performance	"Precious Memories"	Nominated
1974	Best Soul Gospel Performance	"Down Memory Lane"	Nominated
1975	Best Soul Gospel Performance	"In The Ghetto"	Won
1976	Best Soul Gospel Performance	"Jesus Is The Best Thing"	Nominated
1976	Best Soul Gospel Performance	God Has Smiled On Me	Nominated
1976	Best Soul Gospel Performance	To The Glory of God	Nominated
1977	Best Soul Gospel Performance	Give It To Me	Nominated
1977	Best Soul Gospel Performance	Touch Me - Volume II	Nominated
1978	Best Gospel Performance, Traditional	James Cleveland Live at Carnegie Hall	Won
1978	Best Gospel Performance, Traditional	The Lord Is My Life	Nominated
1978	Best Arrangement For Voices	"Oh Lord, Come By Here"	Nominated
1978	Best Inspirational Performance	"Oh Lord, Come By Here"	Nominated
1979	Best Soul Gospel Performance, Traditional	Tomorrow	Nominated
1979	Best Soul Gospel Performance, Traditional	I Don't Feel Noways Tired	Nominated
1980	Best Soul Gospel Performance, Traditional	It's A New Day	Nominated
1980	Best Soul Gospel Performance, Traditional	In God's Own Time	Nominated
1981	Best Soul Gospel Performance, Traditional	"Lord, Let Me Be An Instrument"	Won
1981	Best Soul Gospel Performance, Traditional	"A Praying Spirit"	Nominated
1981	Best Soul Gospel Performance, Traditional	Please Be Patient With Me	Nominated
1982	Best Soul Gospel Performance, Traditional	Where Is Your Faith	Nominated
1985	Best Soul Gospel Performance, Male	"The Prayer"	Nominated
1987	Best Soul Gospel Performance By A Duo, Group, Choir Or Chorus	James Cleveland And The Southern California Community Choir	Nominated
1987	Best Soul Gospel Performance By A Duo, Group, Choir Or Chorus	Dorothy Norwood And Friends	Nominated
1991	Best Gospel Album by a Choir or Chorus	Having Church	Won
1992	Best Gospel Album by a Choir or Chorus	Rev. James Cleveland And The L.A. Gospel Messengers	Nominated

=== Stellar Awards ===
The Stellar Awards are awarded annually by SAGMA. Cleveland has been honored once.

Year	Award	Nominated work	Result
1986	Special Recognition Award	Himself	Honored

== See also ==
• Barry White
