= Albertina Walker =

American gospel singer and songwriter (1929–2010)

- Walker in 2001

Background information
- Also known as: Tina, Queen of Gospel Music
- Born: Albertina Walker; August 29, 1929; Chicago, Illinois, U.S.
- Died: October 8, 2010 (aged 81) Chicago, Illinois, U.S.
- Genre: Gospel
- Occupations: Singer, composer, producer
- Instrument: Vocals
- Years active: 1940–2010
- Labels: Malaco Records; Savoy Records; Benson Records; Word Records; A&M Records; Scepter Records; Hob Records
- Formerly of: Sisters of Glory; The Caravans
- Website: albertinawalker.org

Albertina Walker (August 29, 1929 – October 8, 2010) was an American gospel singer, songwriter and humanitarian.

== Early years ==
Walker was born in Chicago, Illinois, to Ruben and Camilla Coleman Walker. Her mother was born in Houston County, Georgia, and her father in Bibb County, Georgia. They moved to Chicago between 1917 and 1920 where they lived out their lives. Albertina had four siblings born in Bibb County and four born in Chicago. Albertina began singing in the youth choir at the West Point Baptist Church at an early age, and joined several Gospel groups thereafter, including the Pete Williams Singers, the Willie Webb Singers, and the Robert Anderson Singers.

Albertina was greatly influenced by Mahalia Jackson, her friend and confidante, whom Jackson took on the road when Albertina was just a teenager. "Mahalia used to kid me. She'd say, 'Girl, you need to go sing by yourself'", recalled Walker in a 2010 Washington Post interview. Walker did just that. In 1951, she formed the group called The Caravans. She was popularly referred to as the "Queen of Gospel Music", initially by such notables as the late Reverend James Cleveland and Rev. Jesse L. Jackson, Sr, for her outstanding achievements within the genre after the death of Mahalia Jackson in 1972.

== Musical career ==
In the early 1950s, Walker founded her own Gospel music group The Caravans, enlisting fellow singers from The Robert Anderson Singers (Ora Lee Hopkins, Elyse Yancey and Nellie Grace Daniels). The Caravans' membership included: James Cleveland, Bessie Griffin, Shirley Caesar, Dorothy Norwood, Inez Andrews, Loleatta Holloway, Cassietta George, and Delores Washington. Her discovery of these artists resulted in the nickname "Star Maker". Walker retired The Caravans in the late 1960s, performing as a solo artist.

In the mid-1970s, Walker signed with Savoy Records then Benson Records, Word Records, A&M Records, and other record companies, recording a series of solo projects, many of them with big church choirs including The Evangelical Choir, The Cathedral of Love Choir, The Metro Mass choir, and her own church choir, The West Point Choir. Albertina recorded her first solo project Put a Little Love in Your Heart in 1975. She also recorded several projects together with Reverend James Cleveland. To date, she has recorded over 60 albums, including gold selling hits "Please Be Patient With Me", "I Can Go to God in Prayer", "The Best Is Yet to Come", "Impossible Dream", and "Joy Will Come". Walker sang for United States presidents George W. Bush and Bill Clinton, and South Africa's president, Nelson Mandela.

In 1995, Walker joined Thelma Houston, CeCe Peniston, Phoebe Snow and Lois Walden to record a gospel album in common, Good News in Hard Times, as the quintet called The Sisters of Glory.

Walker recorded a reunion album with her group The Caravans entitled Paved the Way, which was released by Malaco Records on September 5, 2006. Performers included Walker, Dorothy Norwood, Inez Andrews and Delores Washington. The album was dubbed by Billboard magazine as one of the most memorable releases of 2006 and entered the Billboard charts in the top ten and remained in the top forty for sixteen weeks. Paved the Way was nominated for a Grammy, Dove, Soul Train Music Award and two Stellar Awards.

== Legacy ==
Walker is featured in Who's Who in Black America as well as other volumes related to the Golden Age of Gospel Music. She received several keys to various cities and was honored at the Chicago Gospel Festival where a bench bearing her name was placed in downtown Chicago's Grant Park.

The City of Chicago paid tribute to Albertina by renaming 35th and Cottage Grove "Albertina Walker and The Caravans Drive". She was also conferred an honorary Doctor of Letters Degree by the Chicago Theological Seminary, an institution of the University of Chicago.

Walker co-founded the Gospel Music Workshop of America along with James Cleveland. She lent her support to, among other groups, United Negro College Fund, American Cancer Society, National Council of Negro Women, Nation of Islam's Million Family March, and the NAACP.

In 1988, she founded The Albertina Walker Scholarship Foundation for the Creative and Performing Arts, which offers financial assistance to college students in the form of scholarships to further their education in the field of music.

== Death ==
On her 81st birthday, Walker was admitted to a local Chicago hospital and placed on a ventilator. For some time she had been battling emphysema. At the time, she was in ICU dealing with respiratory problems–a condition she battled for years, and kept her on oxygen.

On Tuesday, September 7, Walker had a tracheostomy which doctors deemed a success, and she checked out of a Chicago hospital in late September and was admitted to RML specialty hospital for follow up care. She died on October 8, 2010.

== Discography ==
- Freedom (1972)
- God Is Love (1975)
- Reunion (with James Cleveland) (1978)
- Please Be Patient With Me (1979)
- God Is Our Creator (1980)
- I Can Go to God In Prayer (1981)
- Glory to His Name (1982)
- God Is Able to Carry You Through (1983)
- The Impossible Dream (1984)
- Work On Me (1985)
- Spirit (1986)
- The Best Is Yet To Come (1988)
- My Time Is Not Over (1989)
- You Believed in Me (1990)
- Live (1992)
- Songs Of The Church (1994)
- I'm Still Here (1997)
- Sail Away Some Bright Morning (1999)
- Best of Albertina Walker (2004)
- Passion For Our Lord (2006)
- Platinum Gospel (2011)
- Harvest Collection (2013)
- Golden Gospel Classics (2016)
- In My Heart (2021)
- Carry Me Home (2021)
- Joy Like A River (2021)
- One Of These Days (2021)
- Remember Me (2021)
- Let's Go Back: Live In Chicago (2022)
- In Times Like These (2024)

== Videography ==
=== Film and other appearances ===
- Leap of Faith – starring Steve Martin and Debra Winger
- Going Home to Gospel with Patti Labelle
- The Gospel Truth – Off-Broadway play
- The Evolution of Gospel
- The Gospel Legends

=== Television appearances ===
Walker appeared on The Oprah Winfrey Show, Good Morning America and The Tavis Smiley Show among others. She was a frequent guest on the nationally syndicated BET and Word television networks, Bobby Jones Gospel, Testify and Singsation.

== Awards and honors ==
Walker earned many awards and honors over her six decades of music ministry. Among them, 5 Gold Records; several Gospel Music Workshop of America Excellence Awards; an induction into the 2001 Gospel Music Hall of Fame in Nashville, Tennessee. She is also a recipient of a 2005 National Heritage Fellowship awarded by the National Endowment for the Arts, which is the United States government's highest honor in the folk and traditional arts.

=== Dove Awards ===
The Dove Awards are awarded annually by the Gospel Music Association. Walker has earned 3 nominations.

Year	Award	Nominated work	Result
1995	Traditional Black Gospel Album	Songs Of The Church - Live In Memphis	Nominated
1997	Traditional Gospel Album	Let's Go Back - Live In Chicago	Nominated
2007	Traditional Gospel Album	Paved The Way	Nominated

=== Grammy Awards ===
The Grammy Awards are awarded annually by the National Academy of Recording Arts and Sciences. Walker has won 1 award from 12 nominations.

Year	Award	Nominated work	Result
1981	Best Soul Gospel Performance, Traditional	Please Be Patient With Me	Nominated
1984	Best Soul Gospel Performance, Female	God Is Able To Carry You Through	Nominated
1985	Best Soul Gospel Performance, Female	The Impossible Dream	Nominated
1987	Best Soul Gospel Performance, Female	Spirit	Nominated
1987	Best Soul Gospel Performance by a Duo, Group, Choir, or Chorus	Dorothy Norwood and Friends	Nominated
1987	Best Soul Gospel Performance by a Duo, Group, Choir, or Chorus	"Jesus Is Mine"	Nominated
1990	Best Soup Gospel Vocal Performance, Female, Male	My Time Is Not Over	Nominated
1993	Best Traditional Soul Gospel Album	Live	Nominated
1994	Best Traditional Soul Gospel Album	He Keeps On Blessing Me	Nominated
1995	Best Traditional Soul Gospel Album	Songs Of The Church - Live In Memphis	Won
1997	Best Traditional Soul Gospel Album	Let's Go Back: Live In Chicago	Nominated
2007	Best Traditional Gospel Album	Paved The Way (as part of The Caravans)	Nominated

=== Stellar Awards ===
The Stellar Awards are awarded annually by SAGMA. Walker has received 1 award from 4 nominations.

Year	Award	Nominated work	Result
1994	Traditional Female Artist of the Year	Songs Of The Church - Live In Memphis	Won
2008	CD of the Year	Paved The Way	Nominated
2008	Traditional CD of the Year	Paved The Way	Nominated
2008	Traditional Group/Duo of the Year	Paved The Way	Nominated
