= Sara Jordan Powell =

American gospel musician (1938–2025)

- Born: October 6, 1938; Houston, Texas, U.S.
- Origin: Tulsa, Oklahoma, U.S.
- Died: November 16, 2025 (aged 87)
- Genres: Gospel, traditional black gospel
- Occupation(s): Singer, songwriter
- Instrument(s): Vocals, singer-songwriter
- Years active: 1972–2025
- Labels: Savoy

Sara Jordan Powell (October 6, 1938 – November 16, 2025) was an American gospel musician. Her first works, "Touch Somebody's Life" and "When Jesus Comes", were released in 1972, and got significant radio airtime. She released an album that was produced by James Cleveland, Touch Somebody's Life, which came out in 1975 on Savoy Records. Powell released four more albums on that label: 1980's I Must Tell Jesus, 1990's Sara Jordan Powell and When Jesus Comes to Stay, and 1995's The Soul of Sara Jordan Powell. Subsequently, she released one album with Compendia Music Group that same year, Live in Houston.

Her music has been performed at the White House—in 1979 for President Jimmy Carter; she was joined by Chuck Berry, Billy Eckstine, Evelyn "Champagne" King, and Andraé Crouch. President Ronald Reagan appointed her to serve on the Year of the Bible Committee. She later took the opportunity to minister to President Bill Clinton in Memphis, Tennessee, along with saxophonist Dr. Vernard Johnson, at the request of Bishop Louis Henry Ford, who was then presiding Bishop of the Church of God in Christ.

== Life and career ==
Sara Jordan Powell was born in Houston, Texas, on October 6, 1938, the daughter of a minister and pastor at the Turner Memorial Church of God in Christ, and his wife, who was a homemaker. She was born the third of 12 children in her family. Powell started singing when she was two years old. She graduated from Texas Southern University graduate with a Bachelor's degree in English, while minoring in drama and history. After graduation, she headed to Chicago, Illinois, to live with her sister, and she was apprenticed under Thomas A. Dorsey, while working for him during her tenure in Chicago. She was found by the Sallie Martin Singers while in Chicago with Dorsey, and she joined the group, after auditioning successfully. After the Sallie Martin Singers, she was a part of the Voices of Melody, headed by Dr. Charles Clency. Soon thereafter, her father became ill and died, and she and her husband departed for Houston to handle the church's affairs. While she was back in Houston, Powell became a teacher at a school, where she was encouraged to sing during a commencement ceremony, and after that she was a highly sought after local artist.

Around 1971, Rev. James Cleveland eavesdropped on one of her singing engagements in Los Angeles, California, and at his request, she met with him the next day. He asked her about recording, but Powell had never given it much thought. He encouraged her, and she quickly found success in 1972 with the songs, "Touch Somebody's Life" and "When Jesus Comes", which achieved significant radio airtime, and were on her debut album Touch Somebody's Life that came out in 1975 on the Savoy label. She attended Southwest Theological Seminary, and obtained her master's degree from University of St. Thomas, after achieving musical success. Powell had the opportunity to perform "Amazing Grace" for President Jimmy Carter at the White House, while they were honoring the Black Music Association, with the likes of Chuck Berry, Billy Eckstine, Evelyn "Champagne" King, and Andraé Crouch, on June 7, 1979.

Powell was an academic advisor at Oral Roberts University after she and her husband relocated there for her husband to pursue his Juris Doctor degree. Powell was the Church of God in Christ's Fine Arts Executive Director for 10 years. She was asked to serve on the Year of the Bible Committee by President Ronald Reagan. Powell had the opportunity to minister to President Bill Clinton in Memphis, Tennessee, along with Dr. Bernard Johnson, at the request of Bishop Lewis Henry Ford.

=== Music career ===
Her music recording career began in 1972, with the release of "Touch Somebody's Life" and "When Jesus Comes", which got significant radio airtime. Those songs were on her first album, Touch Somebody's Life, produced by Rev. James Cleveland, and released by Savoy Records in 1975. She would release four more albums on the label, 1980's I Must Tell Jesus, 1990's Sara Jordan Powell and When Jesus Comes, and 1995's The Soul of Sara Jordan Powell. Later that same year, she released the album Live in Houston with Compendia Music Group. She was inducted into the Oklahoma Jazz Hall of Fame in 2003.

=== Personal life and death ===
Powell resided in Chicago until her death on November 16, 2025, at the age of 87.

== Discography ==
- 1972 -- "Songs of Faith and Inspiration (Savoy)
- 1975 – "Touch Somebody's Life" (Savoy)
- 1980 – "I Must Tell Jesus" (Savoy)
- 1990 – "Sara Jordan Powell" (Savoy)
- 1990 – "When Jesus Comes to Stay" (Savoy)
- 1995 – "The Soul of Sara Jordan Powell" (Savoy)
- 1995 – "Live in Houston" (Compendia)
