= Javen =

- Also known as: JAVEN
- Born: Javen P. Campbell; July 17, 1971 (age 55); Hollywood, Florida
- Origin: Hollywood, California
- Genres: Christian R&B, CCM, contemporary R&B, gospel, urban contemporary gospel
- Occupations: Singer, songwriter, pastor, author
- Instruments: Vocals, singer-songwriter
- Years active: 2002–present
- Labels: Crowne, JCM, Melrose, Tyscot
- Website: javenonline.com worshipinthenow.com

Javen P. Campbell (born July 17, 1971), who goes by the stage name JAVEN, is an American gospel musician and Christian R&B recording artist. His music career started in 2002, with the release, Javen, by Crowne Music Group. He would release two more albums, 2006's Believer with JCM Records, and 2008's Keeping the Faith with Melrose Records, yet these failed to place on any charts. The subsequent album, Worship in the Now, was released in 2013 by Tyscot Records. This album would be his breakthrough released upon the Billboard Gospel Albums and Heatseekers Albums charts.

== Early life ==
Javen was born on July 17, 1971, in Hollywood, Florida, as Javen P. Campbell. Javen is number 12 out of 13 children.

== TV career ==
JAVEN began his TV career as a co-host on the "Paula White Show" on BET from 2001–2002. He has since become a frequent guest soloist appearing on many networks including BET, TBN, FOX, NBC, GMC, and more. His impeccable stage presence led him to star in numerous productions. He was a lead in the theatrical production of "A Raisin in the Sun." From 2002–2003, he starred in the off Broadway musical "The Rock and the Rabbi." He then moved to the big screen in 2005 starring in the movie "The Sixth," and in "One Night with the King" with Omar Sharif and Peter O'Toole in 2006. Continuing with his passion for acting, JAVEN landed a role in the adopted screenplay "Mwen Solé" in 2007. In 2010, he had a supporting role as "Garrett" in the "Preacher's Kid" starring Clifton Powell, Tank, and former Destiny's Child LaToya Luckett; a supporting role in the film "Abandoned" starring Britney Murphy; and several other independent films. As a songwriter, JAVEN wrote and recorded the hit single "One Step" which was featured in the film "The Cross" released in 2010.

In 2014, Javen starred in the HIT sold out stage play, "You're Never Alone," written and directed by Henry Fernandez.

== Music career ==
His music recording career commenced in 2002, with the album, Javen, and it was released by Crowne Music Group on February 5, 2002. His first single, "Never Give Up on Love" from the self-titled CD "Javen" soared to the top 10 CCM charts. He released, Believer, on September 5, 2006 with JCM Records. The subsequent album, Keeping the Faith, was released on September 30, 2008 by Melrose Records. "Keeping the Faith" includes both passionate ballads as well as household favorites like the hit single, "None Like You," which received award nominations such as Best Contemporary Video from GMC and a Dove Award nomination. This dynamic CD features the talents of Recording Artist Israel Houghton, Gospel Recording Artist Deitrick Haddon, Recording Artist Damita Haddon, and industry favorite, Peter Mokran. His fourth album, Worship in the Now, released on May 21, 2013 by Tyscot Records. This album was his breakthrough release upon two Billboard magazine charts, those being The Gospel Albums at No. 12 and The Heatseekers Albums at No. 14.

== Ministry ==
Javen was a full-time worship leader at a mega-church for many years. He hosted a weekly one-hour radio show which drew over 6 million hits and reaching over 250,000 listeners. Javen launched the Worship in the Now Ministries January 2011 in Hollywood, FL which includes the NOW Church. As Senior Pastor, he has developed the ministry to become a spiritual movement for many who have lost hope and direction. The Ministry has a multi-cultural, multi-ethnic diverse congregation from varied backgrounds, nations, races and ages. Throughout the year, WITN hosts conferences across the nation; a Morning Worship, a monthly event called The Encounter; monthly Life Line Prayer & Devotional calls; Outreach events; Youth Sports Camp; as well as partnerships with organizations like WorldVision, Hope for Haiti, Dream Center LA, and other local non-profits.

== Awards ==
In 2004, he was nominated for the Marlin Awards Best Male Contemporary Solo, Best Male Artist, Best Song, and Best Gospel Performance of the Year. JAVEN won two of the four award nominations. He later won the 2007 En Sound Music Award for "Best Urban Soul Album of the Year."

== "100 Keys for Your Right Now" Book ==
In May 2014, Javen released a short book, "100 Keys for Your Right Now," which gathers the profound statements that have revolutionized his life. Javen wrote this book to help readers through the toughest of situations.

== Personal life ==
Javen is based in Hollywood, California and resides in Beverly Hills, California. He is a spokesperson for WorldVision, a Christian humanitarian organization and a donor to Hope for Haiti, a program that houses, feeds, educates and trains over 300 children in Haiti. He also participates in several domestic mission programs addressing homelessness, hunger, and poverty in the Los Angeles area.

== Discography ==
List of selected studio albums, with selected chart positions
| Title | Album details | Peak chart positions | |
| Title | Album details | US Gos | US Heat |
|---|---|---|---|
| Worship in the Now | Released: May 21, 2013; Label: Tyscot; CD, digital download, extended content | 12 | 14 |
