= Tyscot Records =

- Founded: 1976
- Founder: Craig Tyson, Leonard Scott
- Genre: Gospel
- Country of origin: United States
- Location: Indianapolis, Indiana
- Official website: tyscot.com

Tyscot Records is an independent American gospel music record label based in Indianapolis, Indiana.

Tyscot Records was founded by Craig Tyson and Dr. Leonard Scott in 1976 to record their church choir, Christ Church Apostolic Radio Choir.

It now stands as the oldest black-owned Gospel recording label in the nation. Dr. Scott and Tyson established Tyscot Records as a recording vehicle for a local church choir project. Leonard Scott operated Tyscot from offices in his dental practice. The company faced hard financial times in its early years and eventually Craig Tyson decided to relinquish his share in the company. In the 1980s the label gained momentum by signing artists such as the Rev. Bill Sawyer and the Christian Tabernacle Choir, and Robert Turner and the Silver Hearts.

In 1988, Scott's son, Bryant Scott, was hired as the label's General Manager. During the late 1980s and early 1990s, Tyscot Records experienced tremendous growth and success mostly due to the recordings of a new artist, Rev. John P. Kee. Rev. Kee and his New Life Community Choir climbed the charts with each successive recording to land in the number one position in 1992 with the recording "We Walk By Faith".

The company faced a severe crisis in 1993 when their distributor, Spectra, filed for bankruptcy and left owing Tyscot Records over half a million dollars generated from the sale of its products. This meant, in turn, that Tyscot Records would not be able to pay its artists or their bills.

"But each of our artists stayed with us and renewed their contracts even though there was no guarantee they would be compensated,” said Scott. As the 1990s progressed, Tyscot Records experienced tremendous success with John P. Kee, whose 1999 release, “Not Guilty”, sold more than 500,000 copies and gave Tyscot their first RIAA certified Gold Record.

Tyscot Records has a roster of artists with a national and international following, including Deitrick Haddon and the Voices of Unity, the Rance Allen Group, Bishop Leonard Scott (co-founder of Tyscot Records), Shirley Murdock, Rodnie Bryant, Anointed Pace Sisters, Damita Haddon, Bishop Larry Trotter, Bishop Noel Jones and the City of Refuge Sanctuary Choir, VaShawn Mitchell, Morris Chapman, DeAndre Patterson, the Inner City Mass Choir, Garnelle Hubbard-Spearman, Chris Jones, Mark Hubbard, Brent Jones, Oscar Hayes, Cedric Ford, Javen, Lucinda Moore, Jonathan Nelson, Tasha Page-Lockhart and seminal CCM artist Carman.

Tyscot Recording Company's consists of President, Executive Assistant, Senior Director of Marketing, VP of Promotions, A&R Representative, Marketing & Promotions Coordinator, contracted Public Relations personnel, interns and volunteers. Tyscot Records products are distributed by Ryko Distribution for the general market and Word Distribution for the CBA (Christian Booksellers Association) in association with Taseis Media Group.

Label co-founder Craig Tyson died on November 30, 2006, in Indianapolis.

== See also ==
- List of record labels
