= Charles Nicks =

American musician and pastor

- Also known as: Rev. Charles H. Nicks Jr.
- Born: Charles Hercules Nicks; July 18, 1941; Lincoln, Nebraska
- Died: July 28, 1988 (aged 47) Detroit, Michigan
- Genres: Gospel, traditional black gospel
- Occupations: Singer, songwriter
- Instruments: Vocals, singer-songwriter
- Years active: 1985–1993
- Label: Sound of Gospel

Charles Hercules Nicks Jr. (July 18, 1941 – July 28, 1988) was an American gospel musician and former pastor, organist, and accompanist of St. James Baptist Church in Detroit, Michigan. Rev. Nicks released his first musical project in 1985, Come Unto Jesus with Sound of Gospel. He would release some albums while he was still alive, and others posthumously that would chart on the Billboard magazine Gospel Albums chart. Those all got released by Sound of Gospel, which were the following: Free Spirit, Free Spirit Vol 2, St. Louis & East St. Louis Chapter of GMWA, and The Unforgettable Years.

== Early life ==
Nicks was born on July 18, 1941, in Lincoln, Nebraska, to Rev. Charles Hercules Nicks Sr., a Baptist preacher, and Alliece Mahala Nicks (née, West), a pianist, which they named him after his father. His mother was his greatest musical influence early on, which gave him the impetus to learn to play the organ, and this he did aggressively and assertively. He would become the organist of his father church at the age of 16. Rev. Charles H. Nicks Jr. became pastor of St. James Missionary Baptist Church from 1972 to 1988.

== Personal life ==
Nicks was married to Lucille (née, Monroe), at the time of his death from congestive heart failure in Detroit's Sinai – Grace Hospital. Nicks had a sister, Beverley Nicks, who is of Los Angeles, California.

== Music career ==
His music career started in 1985, with the release of Come Unto Jesus by Sound of Gospel, and this charted at No. 9 on the Billboard magazine Top Gospel Albums chart. He would release four more albums to chart on that very exact same chart, some while he was alive, yet others were released posthumously. The albums charted were the following: 1986's Free Spirit at No. 6, 1988's Free Spirit Vol 2 at No. 3, St. Louis & East St. Louis Chapter of GMWA in 1989 at No. 22, and The Unforgettable Years in 1993 at No. 22.

== Discography ==
List of selected studio albums, with selected chart positions
Title	Album details	Peak chart positions
Title	Album details	US Gos
Come Unto Jesus	Released: 1985; Label: Sound of Gospel; CD, digital download	9
Free Spirit	Released: 1986; Label: Sound of Gospel; CD, digital download	6
Free Spirit Vol 2	Released: 1988; Label: Sound of Gospel; CD, digital download	3
St. Louis & East St. Louis Chapter of GMWA	Released: 1989; Label: Sound of Gospel; CD, digital download	22
The Unforgettable Years	Released: 1993; Label: Sound of Gospel; CD, digital download	22
