= Lucinda Moore =

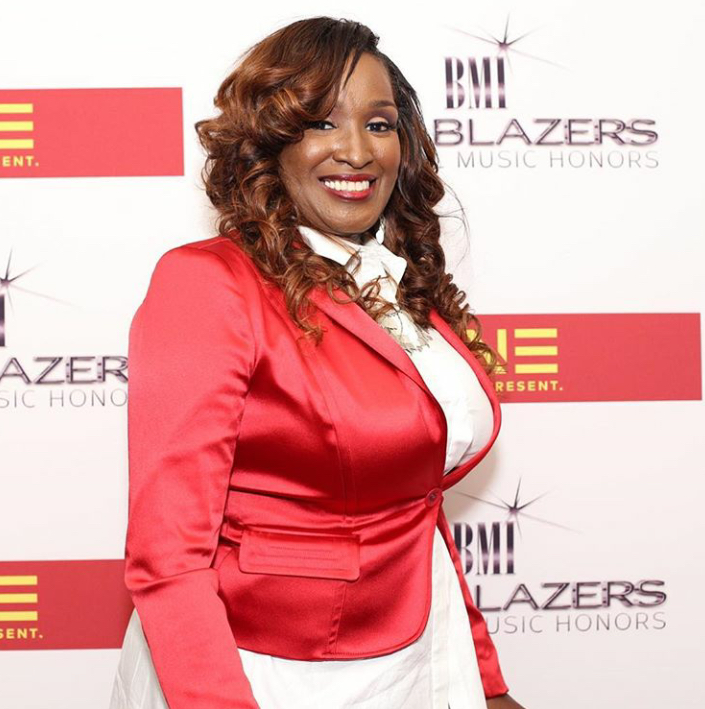
- Lucinda Moore, c.2014

Background information
- Birth name: Lucinda Simmons
- Born: Bridgeport, Connecticut
- Genres: Gospel, traditional black gospel, urban contemporary gospel
- Occupation(s): Singer, songwriter
- Instrument(s): vocals, singer-songwriter
- Years active: 1989–present
- Labels: Tyscot
- Website: lucindamoore.com

Lucinda Moore (née, Simmons) is an American urban contemporary gospel, traditional black gospel, and gospel music recording artist and musician. She started her music career in 1989, and her first studio album, Lucinda Moore, was released by Tyscot Records in 2006. Her second album, Blessed, Broken & Given, was released in 2010, by them. These albums both achieved placements on the Billboard magazine charts.

== Early life ==
Lucinda Moore was born to John Earl and Mary Simmons, where she was raised with her younger sister, Marion. She began singing at fourteen years old, and even sung to her father right before he died on October 23, 1987, during her senior year of high school.

== Music career ==
Her music career began in 1989, with her being a backup singer to Tramaine Hawkins. She released, Unlimited Praise, an extended play, in 2004. The experience would lead to a recording contract for her from Tyscot Records. She released, Lucinda Moore, a studio album, on July 11, 2006. This album was her breakthrough release upon the Billboard magazine charts, while it placed on the Top Gospel Albums chart, where it peaked at No. 18. Lucinda Moore is the songwriter & singer for the hit song "Turn Your Pressure into Praise!" which hit the top of radio charts. The subsequent Live Recorded album, Blessed, Broken & Given, was released on April 27, 2010. It placed even higher on the Gospel Albums chart, where it peaked at No. 13. In 2011, Lucinda Moore was nominated for 2 Stellar Awards and Won for "BEST TRADITIONAL FEMALE ARTIST OF THE YEAR!"

== Personal life ==
She resides in Bridgeport Connecticut.

== Discography ==
=== Studio albums ===
List of studio albums, with selected chart positions
Title	Album details	Peak chart positions
Title	Album details	US Gos
Lucinda Moore	Released: July 11, 2006; Label: Tyscot; CD, digital download	18
Blessed, Broken & Given	Released: April 27, 2010; Label: Tyscot; CD, digital download	13
Walking in My Favor	Released: April 14, 2017; Label: Nalah Music Group; CD, digital download	3
