= Esther Smith (musician) =

American gospel musician (born 1937)

- Born: Esther Jones; December 9, 1937 (age 88); Guntown, Mississippi
- Origin: Chicago, Illinois
- Genres: CCM, gospel, traditional black gospel, urban contemporary gospel, praise & worship
- Occupations: Singer, songwriter
- Instruments: Vocals, singer-songwriter
- Years active: 1988–present
- Labels: Sound of Gospel, A&M, Dorohn

Esther Smith (born December 9, 1937, as Esther Jones), is an American gospel musician and artist. She started her music career, in 1988, with the release of He Loves Me by Sound of Gospel. She has released seven more albums, since her first release, with two more labels A&M Records and Dorohn Records. Two albums have charted on the Billboard magazine charts, which have primarily come on the Gospel Albums chart.

== Early life ==
Smith was born Esther Jones on December 9, 1937, in Guntown, Mississippi, whose father abandoned the family because he was a womanizer, while her mother was a housekeeper to provide for Esther and two more siblings. At 13 years old, Smith's mother was nearly killed by a boyfriend, so they moved to Chicago, Illinois, where Smith got involved in the church. She left her mother's troubling home environment, and was raised by Mom and Dad Lockhart, which she became the lead singer of The Lockhart Singers. When she reached 18 years old, she became a missionary, and put her musical aspirations on hiatus for a while.

== Music career ==
Her recording music career started in 1988, with Sound of Gospel releasing, He Loves Me. She would release four more albums with the label, with one charting on the Billboard magazine Gospel Albums, and this was her 1990's Live in Concert release peaking at 23. With A&M Records, she released one album in 1994, Born to Worship, yet this did not chart. She would release two albums with Dorohn Records, and one of those charted on the aforementioned chart in 2000, You Love Me...Still, at No. 19, and it placed on the Independent Albums at No. 50.

== Discography ==
=== Studio albums ===
List of selected studio albums, with selected chart positions
Title	Album details	Peak chart positions
Title	Album details	US Gos
Live in Concert	Released: 1988; Label: Sound of Gospel; CD, digital download	23
You Love Me...Still	Released: 2000; Label: Dorohn; CD, digital download	19
