= Lamar Campbell =

Lamar Campbell may refer to:

- Lamar Campbell (American football) (born 1976), American retired National Football League player
- Lamar Campbell (musician) (born 1964), American gospel musician
