= Darius Brooks =

American gospel musician (born 1963)

- Born: Darius Lionel Brooks; April 30, 1963 (age 62); Chicago, Illinois, U.S.
- Genres: CCM, gospel, traditional black gospel, urban contemporary gospel
- Occupations: Singer, songwriter
- Instruments: Vocals, Piano, Organ
- Years active: 1990–present
- Labels: Sound of Gospel, Journey, Chordant
- Website: dariusbrooks.com

Darius Lionel Brooks (born April 30, 1963) is an American gospel musician. He started his music career, in 1990, with the release of, Simply Darius, by Sound of Gospel, and he would go on to release five more albums with his own label imprint, Journey Music Group. For three of these albums, they would chart on the Billboard Gospel Albums chart.

== Early life ==
Brooks was born on April 30, 1963, in Chicago, Illinois.

== Music career ==
His music recording career commenced in 1990, with the album, Simply Darius, and it was released on January 11, 1990, by Sound of Gospel. This album was his breakthrough released upon the Billboard Gospel Albums chart at No. 24. While the 2004 edition of Your Will was released on July 27, 2004, by EMI label, Chordant Receords, and this placed at No. 32 on the aforementioned chart. His subsequent album, My Soul, was released on April 4, 2006, by Journey Records, and this peaked at No. 16 on the Gospel Albums chart.

== Discography ==
List of selected studio albums, with selected chart positions
Title	Album details	Peak chart positions
Title	Album details	US Gos
Simply Darius	Released: January 11, 1990; Label: Sound of Gospel; CD, digital download	24
Your Will	Released: July 27, 2004; Label: Chordant; CD, digital download	32
My Soul	Released: April 4, 2006; Label: Journey; CD, digital download	16
