= Oscar Hayes =

American musician (1967–2015)

- Also known as: Reverend Oscar Hayes
- Born: Oscar Eason Hayes; October 12, 1967; Detroit, Michigan
- Died: January 19, 2015 (aged 47) Detroit, Michigan
- Genres: CCM; gospel; traditional black gospel; urban contemporary gospel
- Occupations: Singer; songwriter; musician
- Instruments: Vocals; piano
- Years active: 1991–2015
- Labels: Tyscot; Sound of Gospel
- Formerly of: The Abundant Life Fellowship Chorale

Reverend Oscar Eason Hayes (October 12, 1967 – January 19, 2015), was an American gospel musician and leader of The Abundant Life Fellowship Chorale. He started his music career, in 1991, with the release of Got 2 Tell It by Tyscot Records. His second album, Simply Determined, was released in 1993 by Tyscot Records, and this was his breakthrough release upon the Billboard magazine Gospel Albums chart. The third release, Choir Music, Vol. 1: Live in New Orleans, came out in 2001 from Sound of Gospel and this placed on the aforementioned chart.

== Early life ==
Reverend Hayes was born on October 12, 1967, in Detroit, Michigan, as Oscar Eason Hayes, whose mother June Hayes, resided in the Northern part of the city, and this caused Hayes to be exposed to a myriad of societal ills. Rev. Hayes graduated from William Tyndale Christian College with his bachelor's degree, while he was in Baton Rouge, Louisiana, at A.P. Clay Christian Seminary he graduated with his Master's and Th.D.

== Music career ==
He began his music recording career in 1991, with the release of Got 2 Tell It on November 26, 1991, by Tyscot Records. His second album, Simply Determined, was released by Tyscot Records on July 26, 1993, and it was his breakthrough release upon the Billboard magazine Gospel Albums chart at No. 27. The third album, Choir Music, Vol. 1: Live in New Orleans, was released on July 31, 2001, by Sound of Gospel, and it placed on the aforementioned chart at No. 19.

== Personal life ==
Reverend Hayes was married Erica Hayes, at the time of his death on January 19, 2015, and he was the pastor at Nazarene Missionary Baptist Church. Most importantly he was a father of 3 children Rickey, Omnee and Oscar Jr, and a grandfather of 5. He had a host of family he created and loved.

== Discography ==
List of studio albums, with selected chart positions
Title	Album details	Peak chart positions
Title	Album details	US Gos
Got 2 Tell It	Released: November 26, 1991; Label: Tyscot; CD, digital download	–
Simply Determined	Released: July 26, 1993; Label: Tyscot; CD, digital download	27
Choir Music, Vol. 1: Live in New Orleans	Released: July 31, 2001; Label: Sound of Gospel; CD, digital download	19
