= Leonard Scott (musician) =

- Also known as: Bishop Leonard Scott
- Born: Leonard Stephen Scott; February 28, 1949 (age 77); Indianapolis, Indiana
- Genres: Gospel, traditional black gospel, urban contemporary gospel
- Occupations: Singer, songwriter
- Instruments: Vocals, singer-songwriter
- Years active: 1989–present
- Label: Tyscot
- Website: bishoplscott.com

Bishop Leonard Stephen Scott (born February 28, 1949) is an American gospel musician and pastor of Rock Community Church. He started his music career, in 1989, with Tyscot Records releasing Holy, and they have released all of his albums. Scott has released eleven albums with three of those charting on the Billboard magazine Gospel Albums chart.

== Early life ==
Bishop Scott was born Leonard Stephen Scott, on February 28, 1949, in Indianapolis, Indiana, and founded the Tyscot Records label with L. Craig Tyson to facilitate the promotion of his church choir, Christ Church Apostolic Radio Choir.

== Music career ==
His music recording career started in 1989, with the release of Holy by his label Tyscot Records, and he has released all eleven of his albums with that particular label. The breakthrough release upon the Billboard magazine Gospel Albums chart was Hymns for the Nation in 2004, which charted at No. 39. His album, Hymns & Church Songs Live from Alabama, was released in 2006, and it charted at No. 29. The 2008 album, Be Lifted Up, charted at No. 18.

== Discography ==
List of studio albums, with selected chart positions
Title	Album details	Peak chart positions
Title	Album details	US Gos
Hymns for the Nation	Released: September 14, 2004; Label: Tyscot; CD, digital download	39
Hymns & Church Songs Live From Alabama	Released: April 25, 2006; Label: Tyscot; CD, digital download	29
Be Lifted Up	Released: April 15, 2008; Label: Tyscot; CD, digital download	18
