= Wanda Nero Butler =

American gospel musician

- Also known as: Princess of Gospel
- Born: Lawanda Marie Nero; September 24, 1958 (age 67); Solano County, California
- Origin: Detroit, Michigan; Atlanta, Georgia
- Genres: CCM, gospel, traditional black gospel, urban contemporary gospel
- Occupations: Singer, songwriter
- Instruments: Vocals, singer-songwriter
- Years active: 1988–present
- Labels: Sog Secret, Light, Sound of Gospel
- Website: wandanerobutler.com

Wanda Nero Butler (born September 24, 1958 as Lawanda Marie Nero) is an American gospel musician. Her first album, Reach for His Love, was released by Sog Secret in 1987, and her second album, New Born Soul, was released by the label in 1989. The subsequent two albums, Wanda and Live in Atlanta, was released in 1991 by Light Records. She released, Chike-Anyabwille, All to the Glory of God, and Family Prayer, was released in 1994, 1996, and 1999 respectively by Sound of Gospel. All albums charted with the lone exception of Wanda on the Billboard magazine Gospel Albums chart.

== Early life ==
Butler was born in Solano County, California, as Lawanda Marie Nero on September 24, 1958, whose father is Reverend Nero and her mother is Barbara Nero, whose maiden name was Fuller.

== Music career ==
Her music recording career commenced in 1988, with the album, Reach for His Love, and it was released by Sog (Sound of Gospel) Secret, and it was her breakthrough album upon the Billboard magazine Gospel Albums chart at No. 34. The subsequent album, New Born Soul, was released by Sog Secret on January 11, 1990, and it placed upon the aforementioned chart at No. 11. She released, Wanda, with Light Records on July 1, 1991, yet this was her only album that failed to chart. Her fourth album, Live in Atlanta, was released by Light Records on August 29, 1991, and this peaked at No. 22 on the Gospel Albums chart. The album, Chike-Anyabwille, was released by Sound of Gospel on November 29, 1994, and it placed on the aforementioned chart at No. 11. She released, All to the Glory of God, on July 23, 1996 by Sound of Gospel, and this peaked at No. 12 on the Top Gospel Albums chart. The latest release, Family Prayer, released from Sound of Gospel on June 26, 1999 by Sound of Gospel, and this placed at No. 11 on the aforementioned chart.

== Personal life ==
Butler is married to Reverend Zarak Butler, and together they have three children, who formerly resided in Detroit, Michigan, but presently reside in the Atlanta, Georgia area.

== Discography ==
List of studio albums, with selected chart positions
Title	Album details	Peak chart positions
Title	Album details	US Gos
Reach for His Love	Released: 1988; Label: Sog Secret; CD, digital download	34
New Born Soul	Released: January 11, 1990; Label: Sog Secret; CD, digital download	11
Wanda	Released: July 1, 1991; Label: Light; CD, digital download	–
Live in Atlanta	Released: August 29, 1991; Label: Light; CD, digital download	22
Chike-Anyabwille	Released: November 29, 1994; Label: Sound of Gospel; CD, digital download	11
All to the Glory of God	Released: July 23, 1996; Label: Sound of Gospel; CD, digital download	12
Family Prayer	Released: June 26, 1999; Label: Sound of Gospel; CD, digital download	11
