= L. T. Kennedy =

American politician

Member of the Mississippi House of Representatives from the Adams County district
- In office January 1918 – February 26, 1935

Personal details
- Born: April 15, 1882 Guntown, Mississippi
- Died: February 26, 1935 (aged 52) Natchez, Mississippi
- Party: Democrat

Laurens T. Kennedy (April 15, 1882 - February 26, 1935) was a Democratic member of the Mississippi House of Representatives, representing Adams County, from 1918 to his death in 1935.

== Biography ==
Laurens T. Kennedy was born on April 15, 1882, in Guntown, Mississippi. He went to the University of Mississippi and became the principal of a high school in Natchez, Mississippi. He stopped being the principal in 1909, when he was admitted to the bar. He then practiced law in Natchez, Mississippi. He was Natchez's city attorney for a period of time. He was the president of the Natchez board of education for 19 years and was the attorney for the Adams County board of supervisors for 12 years. He was elected as a Democrat to finish an unfinished term representing Adams County in the Mississippi House of Representatives and served, starting in 1918. He served continuously in the House, being re-elected without opposition since his first election. From 1923 to his death, he was the chairman of the House's appropriations committee. He died on February 26, 1935, at 10:30 PM, in his house in Natchez, Mississippi.
