= Cornelius Augustus =

American baseball player (1905–1981)

- Pitcher
- Born: September 17, 1905; Guntown, Mississippi, U.S.
- Died: March 30, 1981 (aged 75); St. Louis, Missouri, U.S.
- Batted: Unknown Threw: Left

Negro league baseball debut
- 1927, for the Memphis Red Sox

Last appearance
- 1937, for the St. Louis Stars
- Stats at Baseball Reference

Teams
- Memphis Red Sox (1927); St. Louis Stars (1937)

Cornelius "Lefty" Augustus (September 17, 1905 - March 30, 1981) was an American professional baseball pitcher in the Negro leagues. He played with the Memphis Red Sox in 1927 and the St. Louis Stars in 1937.
