= Guntown, Mississippi =

City in Mississippi, United States

- City
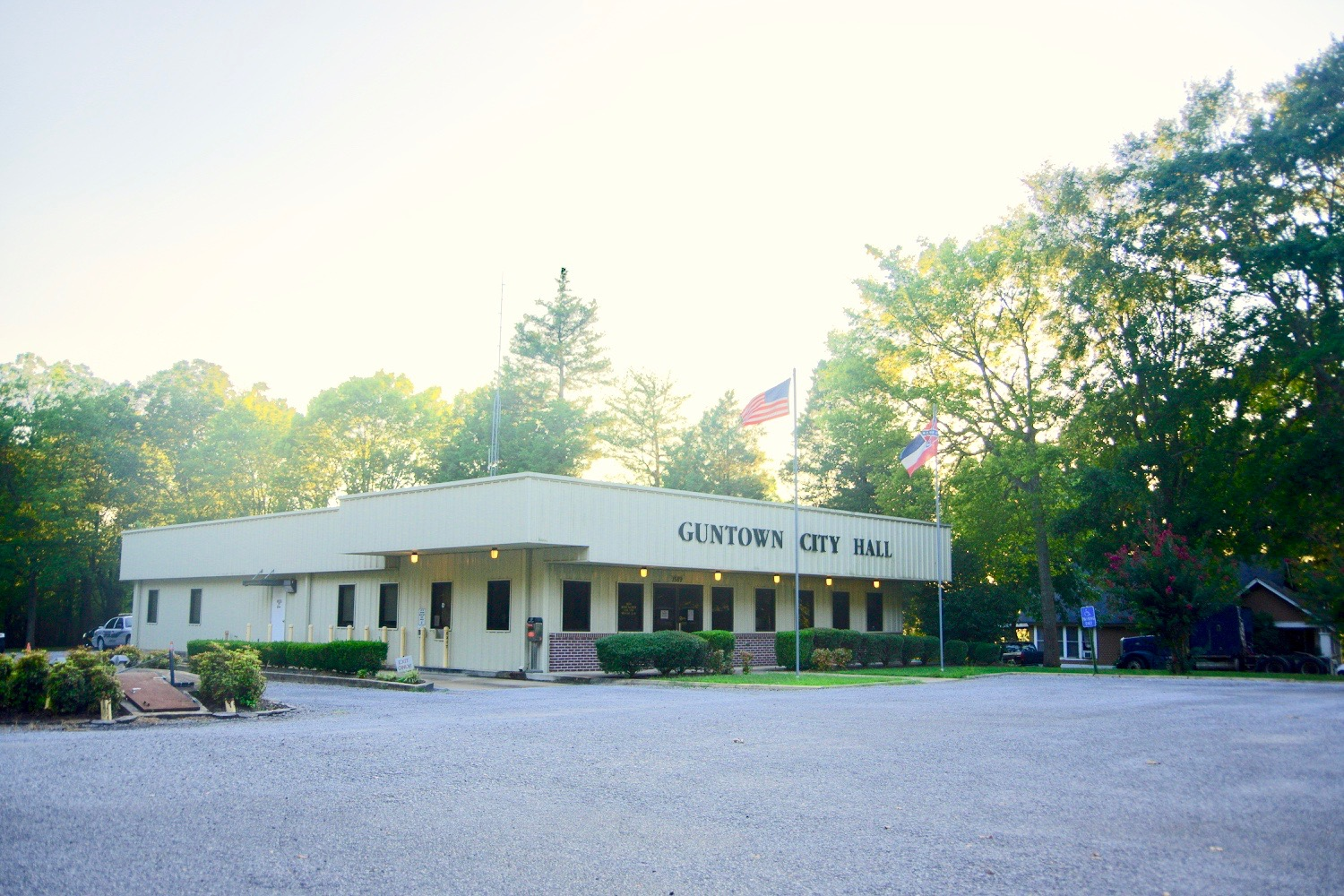
- Guntown City Hall

- Location in Lee county and Mississippi

- Location in the United States
- Coordinates: 34°26′35.4″N 88°39′35.2″W
- Country: United States
- State: Mississippi
- County: Lee
- Districts: 1, 2
- Founded: April 13, 1866
- Incorporated: February 16, 1867
- Named for: James G. Gunn

Government
  - Type: Mayor–Council
  - Mayor: Brent Lindsey (I)
  - Council: Board of Aldermen

Area
  - Total: 4.67 sq mi (12.10 km^{2})
  - Land: 4.66 sq mi (12.07 km^{2})
  - Water: 0.012 sq mi (0.03 km^{2})
- Elevation: 400 ft (122 m)

Population (2020)
  - Total: 2,410
  - Density: 517.2/sq mi (199.68/km^{2})
- Time zone: UTC−06:00 (CST)
  - Summer (DST): UTC−05:00 (CDT)
- ZIP code: 38849
- Area code: 662
- FIPS code: 28-29940
- GNIS feature ID: 670808, 2406630
- Highways: U.S. Highway 45; Highway 145
- Major airport: Memphis Airport (MEM)

Guntown, officially the City of Guntown, is a city in Lee County, Mississippi, United States. It is located in the northern part of the Tupelo micropolitan area. The population was 2,410 at the 2020 Census.

== History ==
Guntown is named for Virginia loyalist émigré James G. Gunn (d. 1826) who found asylum among the Chickasaw in present-day Lee County.

A post office with the name Campbellton was built February 12, 1846 at the site of Guntown. By November 1860, the Mobile and Ohio Railroad had built a line through the settlement. A station had been built by 1874.

During the American Civil War, United States Cavalry officers described it as "a station and small village on the Mobile & Ohio road." Founded on April 13, 1866, it was initially incorporated as the "Town of Guntown" on February 16, 1867.

== Geography ==
Guntown is located along Highway 145, with the older parts of the city lying further to the east near the railroad tracks. U.S. Route 45 traverses the western part of the city, running roughly parallel to MS 145. Baldwyn lies just to the north of Guntown, and Saltillo lies just to the south.

According to the U.S. Census Bureau, the city has a total area of 4.5 square miles (12 km^{2}), of which 4.5 square miles (12 km^{2}) is land and 0.22% is water.

== Demographics ==
Historical population
Census	Pop.	Note	%±
1900	325		—
1910	330		1.5%
1920	365		10.6%
1930	369		1.1%
1940	349		−5.4%
1950	299		−14.3%
1960	269		−10.0%
1970	304		13.0%
1980	359		18.1%
1990	692		92.8%
2000	1,183		71.0%
2010	2,083		76.1%
2020	2,410		15.7%
U.S. Decennial Census

=== 2020 census ===
Guntown Racial Composition
Race	Num.	Perc.
White	1,686	69.96%
Black or African American	511	21.2%
Native American	7	0.29%
Asian	10	0.41%
Pacific Islander	2	0.08%
Other/Mixed	107	4.44%
Hispanic or Latino	87	3.61%

As of the 2020 United States census, there were 2,410 people, 880 households, and 671 families residing in the town.

=== 2000 census ===
As of the census of 2000, there were 1,183 people, 443 households, and 337 families residing in the city. The population density was 261.1 inhabitants per square mile (100.8/km^{2}). There were 482 housing units at an average density of 106.4 per square mile (41.1/km^{2}). The racial makeup of the city was 74.98% White, 24.18% African American, 0.34% Asian, 0.42% from other races, and 0.08% from two or more races. Hispanic or Latino of any race were 1.01% of the population.

There were 443 households, out of which 45.4% had children under the age of 18 living with them, 51.2% were married couples living together, 21.0% had a female householder with no husband present, and 23.9% were non-families. 22.8% of all households were made up of individuals, and 9.7% had someone living alone who was 65 years of age or older. The average household size was 2.67 and the average family size was 3.12.

In the city, the population was spread out, with 34.3% under the age of 18, 7.0% from 18 to 24, 28.6% from 25 to 44, 20.2% from 45 to 64, and 9.9% who were 65 years of age or older. The median age was 32 years. For every 100 females, there were 89.9 males. For every 100 females age 18 and over, there were 80.3 males.

The median income for a household in the city was $27,188, and the median income for a family was $29,783. Males had a median income of $27,868 versus $20,375 for females. The per capita income for the town was $12,456. About 19.3% of families and 24.7% of the population were below the poverty line, including 34.5% of those under age 18 and 17.9% of those age 65 or over.

== Education ==
Guntown is served by the Lee County School District.

== Notable people ==
- Cornelius Augustus, baseball pitcher in the Negro leagues
- L. T. Kennedy, member of the Mississippi House of Representatives from 1918 to 1935
- Chad McMahan, member of the Mississippi Senate
- Esther Smith, gospel music singer

== See also ==
- Brices Cross Roads National Battlefield Site
- List of places named after people in the United States
