= Sonorous Entertainment =

Sonorous Records Inc.
- Parent company: Universal Music Group
- Founded: 2011
- Founder: Dwayne Bigelow, Stephen Taub and Ivan Cavric
- Distributor: Virgin Music Group
- Location: 133 Richmond St. West Suite 310. Toronto, Ontario Canada
- Official website: sonorousrecordings.com

Sonorous Records Inc. is an American company that was established in 2011 as an independent Christian record label by Dwayne Bigelow (Principal/CEO). The company's headquarters is located in Boca Raton, Florida, with its International Division located in Toronto, Ontario, Canada. In 2015, the company became Sonorous Records Inc. with headquarters in Toronto. Sonorous Entertainment remained as the publishing arm.

== House of Beauty (HOB) music catalog ==
House of Beauty was a beauty salon established around 1948 by Carmen Murphy. In the 1950s, she started funding gospel recordings and converted the salon's basement into a practice room.

Murphy's inspiration for HOB Records started when she attended a Good Friday Mass in her home town of Detroit. Finding herself particularly moved by the performances that evening, she would eventually convert the basement of her salon "House of Beauty" into a rehearsal space for local Gospel acts. Later that year, she funded the recording of a local Gospel star Rev. James Cleveland and the HOB Record label was born. Artists for the label included Shirley Caesar, Rev. James Cleveland, The Staple Singers, The Blind Boys of Alabama, Albertina Walker, The Mighty Clouds of Joy, and many others.

Over the years the HOB Records label was owned and operated by a number of companies. The label grew commercially and successfully between 1964 and 1976 when Scepter Records owned it. In 1976 the owner of Scepter Records, Florence Greenberg decided to retire and sold her record labels to Springboard International. When Springboard went bankrupt, Gusto Records acquired the HOB catalog. In the years to follow the HOB catalog continued to change hands.

In the Fall of 2011 Sonorous Entertainment acquired the House of Beauty (HOB) Music Catalog which gave Sonorous the copyrights to over 3,000 sound recordings and the publishing rights to over 200 songs.

== Various projects ==
With a vast collection of songs from the HOB Music Catalog, Sonorous began producing its Platinum Gospel Series. This series included digitally remastered compilations of various and individual Gospel artists. Physical and digital distribution in the United States for the series was undertaken by Sonorous' distribution partner Capitol Records.

Sonorous Entertainment currently operates under the umbrella of Interscope Capitol Labels Group.
