= Bessie Griffin =

American gospel singer (1922–1989)

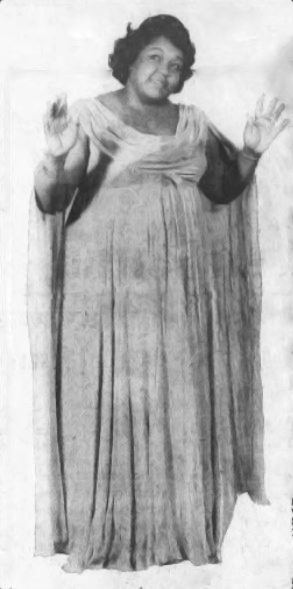
Bessie Griffin, 1977

Bessie Griffin (née Arlette B. Broil; July 6, 1922 – April 10, 1989) was an American gospel singer. From junior high into the late 1940s, she sang with the Southern Harps, who were better known later as the Southern Revivalists of New Orleans, then performed with The Caravans for a year and toured with W. Herbert Brewster Jr. Mentored by Mahalia Jackson, she moved to Chicago in the early 1950s and then relocated to Los Angeles at the end of the decade. She performed in theaters and night clubs, and appeared on popular televisions shows like The Ed Sullivan Show and The Dinah Shore Show.

== Early life and education ==
Arlette B. Broil was born on 6 July 1922 in New Orleans, Louisiana, to Victoria (née Walker) and Enoch Broil. Broil's mother died when she was five and she was raised by Lucy Narcisse, her "grandmother", in a strict Baptist home. Narcisse was actually her mother's cousin and was related to the singer and minister Louis Narcisse. The family went to church at 5 a.m. each Sunday. That service was followed by Sunday school at 9 a.m. and a second service at 11. After supper, they attended the 3 o'clock service, followed by the children's choir at 5 p.m., Baptist Young People's Training Union meeting at 6 p.m., and then the evening service. Broil attended public school and graduated from McDonogh Number 35 Senior High School. She had no formal voice training, but was taught to sing by her grandmother around the age of five.

== Recording career ==
Beginning in junior high school, Broil performed with a gospel quartet, known as the Southern Harps. After touring throughout the South, in 1947, the all-girl, a cappella quartet recorded two 78s for King Records. The following year, they recorded four 78s with Bob Shad, as the Southern Revivalists Of New Orleans. Accompanied by guitarist Brownie McGhee, she also recorded several solo singles for Shad. After a failed two-year marriage to Willie Griffin, in 1951, she became engaged to Spencer Jackson, with whom she would have her only child, Spencer, Jr. In 1951, when Mahalia Jackson came to New Orleans to sing, Griffin went to the concert and the two singers met. Jackson took the younger singer under her wing and invited her to come to Chicago to appear in a gospel performance at the Chicago Coliseum. Griffin sang two songs to an audience of over 40,000 people, who had come to celebrate Jackson's 25th anniversary in the music business and was well received.

When her recording of "Too Close" in 1953 failed to gain the acceptance she had hoped, Griffin joined The Caravans, a gospel group led by Albertina Walker. She recorded nine tracks with them in 1954 for States Records, but left the group, as she was unable to earn a living. Moving to Chicago, she performed on the church circuit. She also recorded a single for Al Benson's Parrot label. She toured for a year with W. Herbert Brewster, Jr., son of the noted pastor and musician W. Herbert Brewster, but failing to find success, returned to New Orleans where she performed as a soloist and disc jockey. In 1958, she moved to Los Angeles and was signed by Art Rupe of Specialty Records. The following year, Griffin founded a group called the "Gospel Pearls" and collaborated with Robert "Bumps" Blackwell in making the first gospel musical. After opening in Los Angeles, the musical Portraits In Bronze, based upon Sweet Flypaper of Life by Langston Hughes, she toured the show in Las Vegas and various California night clubs and theaters.

Griffin's voice was described by Leonard Feather of the Los Angeles Times as similar to both Bessie Smith and her mentor Jackson, but with "a broad and genuine range without falsettos, excellent enunciation and a deep spirituality which can hardly fail to excite with its honesty and power". After touring with Bronze, she recorded an album on the Decca label with an orchestra: "It Takes a Lot of Love" and made "Portraits in Bronze" on Liberty. She joined the night club circuit in the 1960s singing and recording gospel albums and appeared on television, but never realized large earnings. Among her appearances were a performance at Disneyland, on the Pat Boone show, several appearances on The Ed Sullivan Show, and in a Dinah Shore special with Frank Sinatra, Gerry Mulligan's Jazz Quartet, and folksingers, Bud & Travis.

Griffin recorded a solo album for Savoy, an album with the Gospel Pearls entitled "Gospel Soul" on Sunset and released a live recording of a concert on the Nashboro. She struggled with health problems, in 1970 had a heart attack, and had a long battle with peritonitis, which required several hospitalizations that interrupted her career. In 1974 she appeared in Together Brothers, as the character "Reverend Brown". The 20th Century Fox thriller, shot in Galveston, Texas, was scored by Barry White. The following year, she was recorded by Anthony Heilbut in her home, singing a variation of "The Lord Will Make A Way", which was later released on an album with other artists called All Of My Appointed Time. Recordings from the Southern Revivalists Of New Orleans were re-released in 1984 by Krazy Kat Records and she continued to tour at festivals and churches, as her health permitted.

== Death and legacy ==
Griffin died from breast cancer at the Brockton Memorial Center, Culver City, California on April 10, 1989. She was interred in the Inglewood Park Cemetery in Inglewood, California. Her most known recordings included Come Ye Disconsolate, It's Real, Soon-ah Will Be Done With the Trouble of the World and The Days Are Passed and Gone. The recording she made with Heilbut was sampled in the 1996 dance track "I Know The Lord" by the band The Tabernacle. The same sample was also used in 1999 for the Shaboom track "Bessie".

== Selected works ==
- 1972, The Gospel Sound, Vol. 2. Columbia Records #31595
- 1986, Black Gospel Singing: A Capella Gospel Singing (The Golden Age of Gospel Singing 1936-1954). Folklyric Records #9045
- 1994, Women Of Gospel's Golden Age, Vol 1. Specialty Records #567
- 1995, Great Gospel Women, Vol.2. Shanachie Records #6017
- 1996, All of My Appointed Time: Forty Years of A Cappella Gospel Singing. Mojo Records #308 [Jass #604 (1993), Stash Records #114 (1978)].
