= Year of the Bible =

In February 1982, Senator William L. Armstrong and Congressman Carlos Moorhead sponsored Senate Joint Resolution 165, 96 Stat. 1211 (H.J.Res.487 in the house,) a joint resolution authorizing and requesting the President to proclaim 1983 as the "Year of the Bible". In the United States, 1983 was designated as the national Year of the Bible by President Ronald Reagan by Proclamation 5018, made on February 3, 1983, at the annual National Prayer Breakfast. President Reagan was authorized and requested to so designate 1983 by Public Law 97-280 (Senate Joint Resolution 165], 96 Stat. 1211) passed by Congress and approved on October 4, 1982.

The law recited that the Bible "has made a unique contribution in shaping the United States as a distinctive and blessed nation and people" and that, quoting President Andrew Jackson, the Bible is "the rock on which our Republic rests". It also acknowledged a "national need to study and apply the teachings of the Holy Scriptures." "Can we resolve to reach, learn and try to heed the greatest message ever written, God's Word, and the Holy Bible?" Reagan asked. "Inside its pages lie all the answers to all the problems that man has ever known."

Paul Broun of Georgia sought a comparable declaration for 2010, but his proposal, 111 H. Con. Res. 112, did not emerge from the committee to which it was referred.

On January 30, 2012, Pennsylvania state lawmakers declared 2012 to be the "Year of the Bible". The Resolution passed by the Pennsylvania House of Representatives, HR 535, has faced resistance from atheist groups. In response, an atheist group, American Atheists, paid for the placement of a billboard in Harrisburg, Pennsylvania that protests the bill.

Governor Matt Bevin of Kentucky declared both 2016 and 2017 the Year of the Bible in the state.

== See also ==
- International Year of Bible Reading (declared by President George H. W. Bush at the National Prayer Breakfast in February 1990)
