= Mark Hubbard (musician) =

American gospel musician (born 1966)

- Born: Mark S. Hubbard; October 15, 1966 (age 59); Chicago, Illinois
- Genres: Christian R&B, gospel, traditional black gospel, contemporary R&B, urban contemporary gospel
- Occupations: Singer, songwriter
- Instruments: Vocals, singer-songwriter
- Years active: 1992–present
- Labels: Tyscot, Platinum Entertainment, Utopia

Mark S. Hubbard (born October 15, 1966) is an American gospel musician. He started his music career, in 1992, with the release of Trust in Jesus by Tyscot Records. This was his only album to chart on the Billboard magazine Gospel Albums chart. The next two albums, No, I Won't Turn Back in 1995 and He's up There in 1996, were released by Tyscot Records. The 1998 release, Different Level, was released by Platinum Entertainment, and his fifth album, Blessin' Waitin' on Me, was released by Utopia Music Group. His backing choir was called, The United Voices for Christ, now affectionately known as "The Voices".

To round out Mark Hubbard's music credentials, in 2017 Mark was elected as President Of the Chicago Chapter of The Recording Academy "The GRAMMYs.”

== Early life ==
Hubbard was born on October 15, 1966, in Chicago, Illinois, as Mark S. Hubbard, and his mother was Bishop Louarraire at Greater Temple Missionary Baptist Church. He became a believer in Jesus Christ at the age of five, and joined his mothers church, where he eventually lead the choir. His choir, The United Voices for Christ, was created in 1985, and it first had three participants, yet swelled to over one hundred.

== Music career ==
His music recording career began in 1992, with the release of Trust in Jesus by Tyscot Records on September 25, 1992, and this was his only album that chart upon the Billboard magazine Top Gospel Albums chart at No. 28. The next two releases were released by Tyscot Records, on March 21, 1995, with No, I Won't Turn Back and October 22, 1996, release of He's up There. He would go on to release two more albums on August 18, 1998, Different Level, with Platinum Entertainment, and October 12, 2004, release of Blessin' Waitin' on Me with Utopia Music Group which awarded him his first stellar award in 2006.

== Personal life ==
Hubbard resides in Chicago, Illinois, where he attends church at New Life Covenant Church, Pastor John Hannah.

== Discography ==
List of studio albums, with selected chart positions
Title	Album details	Peak chart positions
Title	Album details	US Gos
Trust in Jesus	Released: September 25, 1992; Label: Tyscot; CD, digital download	28
No, I Won't Turn Back	Released: March 21, 1995; Label: Tyscot; CD, digital download	–
He's up There	Released: October 22, 1996; Label: Tyscot; CD, digital download	–
Different Level	Released: August 18, 1998; Label: Platinum Entertainment; CD, digital download	–
Blessin' Waitin' on Me	Released: October 12, 2004; Label: Utopia; CD, digital download	–
