= Bobby Jones Gospel =

- Created by: Bobby Jones
- Starring: Bobby Jones
- Country of origin: United States

Production
- Running time: 1 hour

Original release
- Network: BET
- Release: January 27, 1980 – July 31, 2016

Bobby Jones Gospel (sometimes called The Bobby Jones Gospel Hour) was a program on BET hosted by Dr. Bobby Jones. The series premiered on January 27, 1980, two days after the network's January 25 launch. Bobby Jones Gospel features performances by gospel music artists. It was BET's longest running program. On April 27, 2015, it was announced that the show would be coming to an end after 35 years. The finale aired July 31, 2016.
