= Donald Vails =

American songwriter (1948–1997)

- Also known as: Rev. Donald Raymond Vails
- Born: Donald Raymond Vails, Jr. December 25, 1948; Atlanta, Georgia, US
- Died: September 10, 1997 (aged 48) Clinton, Maryland, US
- Genres: gospel, traditional black gospel, urban contemporary gospel
- Occupations: Singer, songwriter
- Instruments: vocals, piano, singer-songwriter
- Years active: 1977–1996
- Labels: Savoy, Sound of Gospel
- Formerly of: The Choraleers

Reverend Donald Raymond Vails, Jr. (December 25, 1948 – September 10, 1997), was an American gospel musician and pianist. He started his recorded music career in 1977, with the release, Donald Vails Choraleers on Savoy Records. Vails released sixteen albums with two labels, Savoy Records and Sound of Gospel. He released five albums that charted on the Billboard magazine Gospel Albums chart: He Promised a New Life in 1984 with Savoy Records, 1986's Yesterday, Today and Forever with Sounds of Gospel, 1987's Until the Rapture again with Sounds of Gospel, In Jesus Christ I Have Everything I Need in 1990 also with Sounds of Gospel, and 1994's A Sunday Morning Songbook with Savoy Records. The album, He Decided to Die, was a Grammy Award-nominated release, and it was certified as a gold album by the RIAA.

== Early life ==
Vails was born on December 25, 1948, in Atlanta, Georgia. His parents sent him to a nursery school at Gospel Choral Union, and this instilled in him a love of gospel music and the piano. He was reared in the church in his hometown at Mt. Zion Baptist Church. He was leading a choir by age twelve, and after high school, he relocated to Detroit, Michigan to pursue a degree in engineering at Detroit Institute of Technology and formed The Choraleers in 1969. Vails relocated to Washington, D.C., in 1985 to attain a master's degree in Music at Howard University. During this time, he became a member of Ebenezer AME Church located in Fort Washington, Maryland, and this caused the church's choir to grow from 40 to 175 participants in a few months. Vails also established the Salvation Corporation, an 80-member interdenominational choir.

== Music career ==
Vails began his recorded music career in 1977, with the release of Donald Vails Choraleers on Savoy Records. His sixteen albums made the Billboard magazine Gospel Albums chart, for five of those releases: He Promised a New Life in 1984 with Savoy Records at No. 32, No. 17 for Yesterday, Today and Forever with Sound of Gospel in 1986, 1987's Until the Rapture at No. 11 with Sound of Gospel, In Jesus Christ I Have Everything I Need again with Sound of Gospel in 1990 peaking at No. 26, and 1994's A Sunday Morning Songbook at No. 33 with Savoy Records. They would achieve a gold album certification by the RIAA and a Grammy Award nomination for their 1978 album, He Decided To Die, with Savoy Records.

== Personal life ==
Vails was married to Janine Vails (née, Anderson) when he died from a lengthy illness in Clinton, Maryland, on September 10, 1997.

== Discography ==
List of selected studio albums, with selected chart positions
| Title | Album details | Peak chart positions |
| Title | Album details | US Gos |
|---|---|---|
| He Promised a New Life | Released: 1984; Label: Savoy Records; CD, digital download | 32 |
| Yesterday, Today and Forever | Released: 1986; Label: Sound of Gospel; CD, digital download | 17 |
| Until the Rapture | Released: 1987; Label: Sound of Gospel; CD, digital download | 11 |
| In Jesus Christ I Have Everything I Need | Released: 1990; Label: Sound of Gospel; CD, digital download | 26 |
| A Sunday Morning Songbook | Released: 1994; Label: Savoy; CD, digital download | 33 |
