= Cassietta George =

American musician

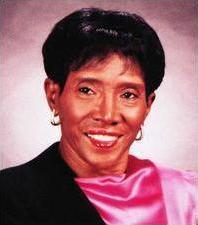
Cassietta George

Cassietta George (January 23, 1929 – January 3, 1995) was an American gospel vocalist, and composer for many of the songs sung by The Caravans. George was a member of Queen of Gospel Albertina Walker's The Caravans, She later launched a successful solo career, with 16 albums in Los Angeles for Audio Arts Inc. Along the way, George was twice nominated for a Grammy in 1969 & 1979, for Best Soul Gospel Performance. In 2017, she was inducted into the Memphis Music Hall of Fame.

== Life and career ==
Cassietta Baker was born in Memphis, Tennessee during the late 1920s. When she was four, she began singing in her father's church. Baker was a singer with the Brewster Ensemble and The Caravans. She died in Los Angeles in 1995, aged 65.

== Selective discography ==
Year	Title	Genre	Label
1964	Walk Around Heaven	Gospel	Audio Arts
1969	This Time	Gospel	Audio Arts
1979	Cassietta in Concert	Gospel	Audio Arts
