= The Caravans =

American gospel music group

- Also known as: Robert Anderson and His Gospel Caravan (1947–1951); Robert Anderson and The Caravanas (1951–1952)
- Origin: Chicago, Illinois
- Genres: Gospel
- Years active: 1947–1976, 2006-2010
- Labels: Miracle, Premium, States, United, Sharp, Specialty, Savoy, Gospel, Vee Jay, HOB, Trip, Exodus, Fairway, Buddah, Caritas, Jewel, Birthright, Malaco
- Past members: Members

The Caravans were an American gospel music group that was started in 1947 by Robert Anderson. It reached its peak popularity during the 1950s and 1960s, launching the careers of a number of artists, including: Delores Washington, Albertina Walker, Bessie Griffin, Cassietta George, Dorothy Norwood, Inez Andrews, Shirley Caesar and the Rev. James Cleveland, among others.

The group underwent numerous personnel changes between 1951 and 1961. The years 1962 to 1966 provided the Caravans with its most stable group member lineup, consisting of Washington, Walker, Caesar, George, James Herndon and Josephine Howard. The group also made frequent TV appearances during this time on shows such as TV Gospel Time and Jubilee Showcase.

== Founding ==
The Caravans were founded in 1947 under the name Robert Anderson and his Gospel Caravan by Robert Anderson in Chicago, Illinois to serve as Anderson's backing vocalists. The group consisted of Ora Lee Hopkins, Elyse Yancey, Irma Gwynn, Edward Robinson, the pianist, and Louise Overall Weaver as their organist. Their recordings between 1949 and 1951 were made under the names of Robert Anderson and Choir, Anderson Singers with Robert Anderson, Anderson Singers, and Robert Anderson and his Gospel Caravan.

In 1952, Gwynn left the group, a slight change of the group's name to Robert Anderson and The Caravans was made, and Nellie Grace Daniels and Albertina Walker joined the group. The group featuring Walker and Daniels under their new name made their first and only recording on April 18, 1952. During this recording session, a sequence of events happened, resulting in Robert Anderson parting ways with his background singers. Walker, Hopkins, Yancey, and Daniels and Lelia M.Davidson of New Jersey came into the group recorded the remainder of their tracks, and adopted the group name of The Caravans simply by dropping Robert Anderson's name from the group name. Walker was the featured singer on the albums which the newly emancipated Caravans made.

That changed, however, as other singers joined the group, which retained the close harmonies and precise rhythms of the original group, but now allowed each member the opportunity to solo on alternating leads. At their height in the late 1950s the Caravans combined the alto of Shirley Caesar on songs such as "Swing Low, Sweet Chariot" with the contralto of Inez Andrews on "Mary Don't You Weep", the soprano of Delores Washington, and the frenetic piano style of Eddie Williams.

Bessie Griffin joined the group in 1953, but left after a year. Cassietta George also joined in 1953 and stayed for two years, but returned in 1960 to stay for another year before rejoining in 1962 and staying for another four years. Norwood joined in 1955 and left in 1957, forming her own group, the Norwood Singers. Inez Andrews joined, at the suggestion of James Cleveland, the pianist and arranger for the group, in 1957 and left in 1962 to form her own group, the Andrewettes (a.k.a. The Gospel Challengers of Jamaica, New York). Andrews returned in 1966, only to depart again and go solo in 1967. Caesar had joineded the Caravans in 1958 and left to pursue a solo career in 1966.

== Later years ==
Albertina Walker recorded a reunion album with her group The Caravans entitled "Paved The Way", which was released by Malaco Records on September 5, 2006. This was the group's first new recording since 1976. The group consisted of Walker, Norwood, Andrews, Washington, and special guests Evelyn Turrentine-Agee and Davon Hurn. The album was dubbed by Billboard Magazine as one of the most memorable releases of 2006 (Deborah Evans Price, December 9, 2006) and entered the Billboard charts in the top ten and has remained in the top forty for sixteen weeks. "Paved the Way" was recently nominated for a Grammy, Dove, & Soul Train Music Award. Albertina Walker died from respiratory failure on 8 October 2010.

== Members ==
- Ora Lee Hopkins (1951-1954; died 2000)
- Elyse Yancey (1951-1954)
- Irma Gwynn (1951-1952; died 2006)
- Albertina Walker (1952-1972 and 1976 and 2006; died 2010)
- Nellie Daniels (1952-1954)
- Edward Robinson (1952-1953; died 2014)
- Louise Overall Weaver (1952-1953; died 1990)
- Charlotte Nelson (1953)
- Bessie Griffin (1953-1954; died 1989)
- Iris Humble (1953-1955; died 2019)
- Johneron Davis (1953-1957 and 1960–1962; died 1965)
- James Cleveland (1953-1957 and 1967; died 1991)
- Cassietta George (1953-1956 and 1960 and 1962–1966 and 1976; died 1995)
- Gloria Griffin (1954-1955; died 1995)
- Dorothy Norwood (1956-1957 and 1967 and 2006)
- Sarah McKissick (1956-1958; died 2008)
- Imogene Green (1956-1957; died 1986)
- Inez Andrews (1957-1962 and 1966–1967 and 2006; died 2012)
- Eddie Williams (1957-1959 and 1961–1962; died 2015)
- Shirley Caesar (1958-1966)
- Delores Washington (1958-1959 and 1961–1967 and 1976 and 2006; died 2020)
- James Herndon (1960 and 1963–1967)
- Josephine Howard (1963-1967 and 1976; died 1978)
- Julia Mae Price (1966-1972)
- Bessie Lance (1967)
- Willie McPhatter (1967-1972; died 2015)
- Loleatta Holloway (1967-1972; died 2011)
- Gwen Morgan (1967-1972)
- Doris Willingham (1968-1969; died 2019)
- Isaiah Jones, Jr. (1976; died 2008)
- Davon Hurn (2006)
- Evelyn Turrentine-Agee (2006)
- Lelia Davidson (1956-1957)
- Catherine Morgan (1956-1958)
