= Robert Anderson (singer) =

American gospel singer and composer

- Born: Robert Anderson; March 21, 1919; Anguilla, Mississippi
- Origin: United States
- Died: June 15, 1995 (aged 76); Hazel Crest, Illinois
- Genres: Gospel music
- Occupations: Vocalist, composer
- Instruments: Singer, piano
- Years active: 1933–1995
- Labels: Miracle; United; Apollo; VeeJay; Savoy
- Formerly of: The Roberta Martin Singers; The Knowles and Anderson Singers; The Robert Anderson Singers; The Caravans

Robert Anderson (March 21, 1919 – June 15, 1995) was an American gospel singer and composer. Journalist Kenan Heise stated in the Chicago Tribune that "During the 'Golden Age of Gospel', the 1940s and 1950s, Anderson was the most highly regarded male singer of music giving off a message of joy and redemption." He possessed a baritone voice coupled with a style often compared to that of Bing Crosby or Billy Eckstine. Unlike many of his Chicago gospel contemporaries, Anderson was not known for stage antics, shouting, or other movements while singing. His style contained very little physical movement, with much attention paid to phrasing, tone, and dynamic style.

== Early years and education ==
Robert Anderson was born in Anguilla, Mississippi, and moved to Chicago with his family as a child. During his childhood, Anderson learned piano by ear and assisted Roberta Martin with coaching the Sunday school choir at the Ebenezer Missionary Baptist Church. In 1933, Anderson became one of the original Roberta Martin Singers (RMS); remaining with the group for the next six years. He studied music at the Chicago Conservatory of Music.

== Musical career ==
In 1939 Anderson left the RMS to co-found the Knowles and Anderson Singers with R. L. Knowles; a group with which he performed as a soloist until 1941 when he returned to the RMS. He performed for the next few years with the RMS, but ultimately resigned due to the demands of travel associated with that group. In 1942, he formed Good Shepherd Music House, which he based in Gary, Indiana. Good Shepherd Music House published his compositions, such as "Prayer Changes Things", "Why Should I Worry", and "Oh Lord, Is It I?" In 1943, he performed "Something Within" at the National Baptist Convention. After that performance, his career began to take off.

In 1947, Anderson formed the ensemble 'Robert Anderson and his Gospel Caravan'. This group was would later be renamed The Caravans in 1951. Anderson and The Caravans' first recordings were made in August 1949 and released in September 1949 on the Miracle Records label. In 1951, Anderson and The Caravans joined the United Records label. During an April 18, 1952 recording session, Anderson and The Caravans split ways. After the breakup, Anderson continued to record with a new group of singers called The Robert Anderson Singers. In 1954, Anderson and the Anderson singers joined Apollo Records. In 1955, Anderson began recording as a solo artist, recording and performing sporadically through the mid-1990s for labels such as Vee Jay Records and Savoy Records.

Anderson served as choir director at several churches during his career; including Greater Harvest Baptist Church, Chicago; Opportunity Baptist Church in Los Angeles, and Hertzell United Methodist Church in Chicago.

== Death ==
Robert Anderson died in Hazel Crest, Illinois on June 15, 1995. Anderson was 76 years old.
