= Gospel Music Workshop of America =

- Also known as: GMWA National Mass Choir; GMWA Women of Worship; GMWA Men of Promise; GMWA Youth Mass Choir
- Genres: Gospel
- Years active: 1967 - Present
- Labels: Savoy Records; Intersound Records; Benson Records; A&M Records; King James Records; Sweet Rain Records

Gospel Music Workshop of America is an international music convention founded by Rev. James Cleveland.

== GMWA membership ==
Current board members
- Bishop Albert L. Jamison Sr., Chair, Board of Directors
- Bishop Brian Moore, Executive Vice Chair
- Dr. Rodena Preston, Director of Operations
- Ms. JeJuan Ford, Secretary
- Dr. Kevin Bond, Treasurer
- Mrs. Audrey Howard-Harris, Chair, Finance
- Mr. James D. Robinson Jr. Co-Vice Chair, Development
- Mr. Ron Magnus, Esq., Legal Counsel
- Rev. Isaac Whittman, Vice Chair, Men's Department
- Mr. Steven Roberts, James Cleveland Chorus, Mass Choir
- Elder Isadore Jackson, Contemporary Adults
- Minister Craig Hayes, Youth/Young Adult
- Dr. Charles Reese, Dean, Academic Department
- Mr. James Ford, Ushers & Nurses
- Mrs. Shirley M.K. Berkeley, Co-Vice Chair, Women
- Ms. Merdean Fielding Gales, Youth/ Young Adults
- Dr. Joan Hillsman, Collegiate Night
- Bishop Richard "Mr. Clean" White, Co-Chair, Men's Department
- Sylvester Starks, Ph.D, Finance
- Bishop Sam Williams, Co-Vice Chair, Security
- Dr. Melvin Von Wade Sr., Co-Vice Chair, Men

Active GMWA Membership ranges from professional and amateur Gospel vocalists to instrumentalists, composers, arrangers, directors and producers, and the like. According to its official website, approximately 75% of the music on Billboard's Gospel Charts is written, arranged, produced, or performed by GMWA members. The GMWA also has chapters in the United States, United Kingdom, the Caribbean, Europe, and Asia.

== GMWA conventions and recordings ==
The GMWA presently meets twice a year. A board meeting is held in the spring and the annual convention session is held at a major venue beginning on the second Sunday of August. The conventions include workshops and musical performances during the week and attract 12,000 to 15,000 registrants annually. A mass choir of 2,000 to 3,000 vocalists is formed at each GMWA convention, and each year a new recording is produced. GMWA offshoots who also record include GMWA Women of Worship, GMWA Men of Promise, and the GMWA Youth Mass Choir.

The first GMWA convention was held in Detroit, Michigan in 1968 at King Solomon Baptist Church. Approximately 3,000 delegates attended. The most recent GMWA convention was held in Birmingham, Alabama in 2016 at the Sheraton Hotel. Approximately 12,000 delegates attended. In 2017, the Board Meeting will be held in Las Vegas, Nevada and the 50th Annual Session was held July 22–29, 2017 in Atlanta, Georgia.
