= Inez Andrews =

American gospel singer (1929–2012)

Background information
- Born: Inez McConico; April 14, 1929; Birmingham, Alabama, U.S.
- Died: December 19, 2012 (aged 83) Chicago, Illinois, U.S.
- Genres: Gospel music
- Occupation: Singer
- Years active: 1940s–2012
- Labels: Savoy, Peacock, Song Bird

Sister Inez Andrews, born Inez McConico (April 14, 1929 – December 19, 2012) and better known as Inez Andrews, was an American gospel singer, who was noted for her powerful, wide-ranging voice. The Chicago Tribune stated that "Andrews' throaty contralto made her low notes thunder, while the enormous range of her instrument enabled her to reach stratospheric pitches without falsetto". Her dramatic delivery made her a charismatic presence in church and on stage."

Andrews started singing in the church as a child and performed gospel music on the road in various gospel groups from the 1940s before joining The Caravans in 1957. Fellow member from The Caravans in the 1950s, Shirley Caesar, once dubbed Andrews "The High Priestess" for her ability to hit high notes, and, in 2013, stated, "there never was and never will be another voice like Inez Andrews." Another early member of the Caravans, Albertina Walker often said, "nothing ever worked for the Caravans until Inez started whistling" — hitting the high notes. She sang lead on The Caravans first breakthrough hit, "Mary Don't You Weep", and also had hits as a solo artist with crossover recordings such as "Lord Don't Move The Mountain". (#48 in 1973 on Billboard R&B chart on Song Bird label). She was referred to in 2012 by The New York Times as "the last great female vocalist of gospel's golden age," ranking among the likes of other music legends from the "Golden Era" of Black Gospel (1945–60) – Mahalia Jackson, Marion Williams, Dorothy Love Coates, Sister Rosetta Tharpe and Clara Ward.

== Biography ==
Inez McConico was born in Birmingham, Alabama, to Theodore and Pauline McConico. Her mother died when she was two years old. Her father later remarried Arzulia Thomas. Her father, a coal miner, was often out of work during the Great Depression. Andrews traveled a tough road to gospel stardom. She began singing as a child in church and began songwriting as a young mother in Birmingham. Andrews was working six days a week, ten hours a day for 18 dollars a week, while "washing, ironing, cooking, keep up with the kids." With her busy life in her youth, she felt that life had to have more to offer her. As she pondered that prayerfully, she picked up "a pencil and a brown paper bag" and began to write. Thus began her songwriting career. Andrews began her singing career in the 1940s with two groups in Birmingham, Alabama: Carter's Choral Ensemble and the Original Gospel Harmonettes. By the mid-1950s, the Harmonettes were one of the nation's top gospel groups, with Andrews the understudy for the group's lead singer, Dorothy Love Coates. Coates recommended Andrews to the Caravans, and she eventually moved north to Chicago to become widely known as that group's first successful singer, leading them to the high of their popularity in the 1950s and early 1960s.

In 1962, Andrews left the Caravans to start her own group, Inez Andrews and the Andrewettes. They toured the country performing songs such as "It's in My Heart" and her composition "(Lord I Wonder) What Will Tomorrow Bring?". By 1967 she was touring as a soloist.

In the 1960s, Andrews' solo work and songwriting further ensconced her in the gospel pantheon. Her songs were recorded by many artists, including The Mighty Clouds of Joy and Aretha Franklin. Andrews became one of the major stars of gospel's golden age, with The Caravans songs such as "Lord Keep Me Day By Day", "Remember Me", "I Won't Be Back" and several other hits in which Andrews was lead vocalist, including "Mary Don't You Weep", "I'm Not Tired Yet", "Make It In", "He Won't Deny Me" and "I'm Willing".

In 2006, she released a reunion album with The Caravans, Albertina Walker, Dorothy Norwood, and original soprano Delores Washington, entitled Paved the Way.

=== Solo career ===
After a stellar career with the Caravans, she left the group in 1962 and had huge success with her 1972 crossover hit, "Lord Don't Move the Mountain". Andrews recorded on many labels since the 1950s and has many albums and hit songs to her credit, some of which she composed herself. Andrews enjoyed further solo success throughout the 1970s and 1980s with songs such as "Just For Me", "A Sinner's Prayer" and a live 1981 recording of James Cleveland's hit song "I Appreciate". Andrews claimed to have written the gospel standard "No Tears In Heaven" early in her singing career. The writing credits for the song was disputed between her and Sallie Martin whom Andrews claimed wrote down the lyrics to the song while she was singing it at a program. Andrews recorded her version of the song in 1983.

=== Personal life ===
Andrews was a dedicated Christian and family person. She raised seven children during her career in gospel music. She died at her home on the South Side of Chicago on December 19, 2012, at the age of 83. She had been diagnosed with cancer months earlier. Andrews is survived by seven children, 19 grandchildren and 12 great-grandchildren. She was the paternal grandmother of New Orleans native and female impersonator LeJeune Davis, known professionally as Cyndi Ambivalent.

== Honors and awards ==
In 2002 Andrews was inducted into the Gospel Hall of Fame. She was a two-time Grammy Award nominee. It was announced prior to her death that Andrews would be honoured with the Ambassador Dr. Bobby Jones Legend Award at the 2013 Stellar Awards. The award ended up being presented posthumously.

== Discography ==
- 1963 – The Need of Prayer
- 1964 – Letter to Jesus
- 1972 – Lord Don't Move That Mountain
- 1975 – This is Not the First Time I've Been Last
- 1979 – Chapter 5
- 1980 – A Sinner's Prayer
- 1981 – I Made a Step
- 1982 – My Testimony
- 1984 – Lord Lift Us Up
- 1986 – Jehovah is His Name
- 1987 – The Two Sides of Inez Andrews
- 1988 – If Jesus Came to Your Town Today
- 198? - Close to Thee
- 1990 – Lord Lift Us Up
- 1990 – My Testimony
- 1990 – I Made a Step in the Right Direction
- 1990 – Inez Andrews
- 1991 – Raise Up a Nation
- 1991 – Shine on Me

=== Live album ===
- 1974 – Live At The Munich Gospel Festival
- 1980 The Remarkable Inez Andrews with the True Voices of Christ Concert Ensemble Directed by Kevin Yancy " A Sinners Prayer"

=== Compilation albums ===
- 1999 – Headline News
- 2005 – Most Requested Songs

=== Singles ===
- 1972 – "I'm Free" / "Lord Don't Move The Mountain"
- 1975 – "Help Me" / "God's Humble Servant"
- 1980 – "I'm Free" / "Lord Don't Move The Mountain" (re-release)
- 19?? - "Close To Thee"
