= Dorothy Norwood =

American gospel singer and songwriter (born 1935)

- Also known as: The World's Greatest Gospel Storyteller
- Born: May 29, 1935 (age 91)
- Origin: Atlanta, Georgia, US
- Genres: Gospel
- Occupations: Gospel singer, composer, producer
- Instrument: Vocal (contralto)
- Years active: 1950s–present
- Labels: Malaco, Savoy, Dorothy Norwood Music Group (DNMG)
- Website: http://www.dorothynorwood.com/

Dorothy Norwood (born May 29, 1935) is an American gospel singer and songwriter. She began touring with her family at the age of eight, and in 1956, began singing with Mahalia Jackson. In the early 1960s she was a member of The Caravans, and in 1964, she embarked on a solo career, recording her first album, Johnny and Jesus. Her 1991 album Live with the Northern California GMWA Mass Choir reached the number one position on Billboard′s Top Forty.

Norwood was inducted into the Women Songwriters Hall of Fame in 2023.

== Discography ==
- Johnny And Jesus (1963)
- The Old Lady's House (1964)
- The Bell Didn't Toll (1965)
- He Will Never Let Go My Hand (1965)
- The Denied Mother (1966)
- The Soldier From Viet Nam (1966)
- The Dorothy Norwood Singers (1967)
- Dynamic Gospel Duets By Dorothy Norwood And James Herndon (1967)
- The Singing Slave (1967)
- The Stories Behind The Songs (1968)
- Dorothy Norwood And The Angelic Choir (1968)
- Brother Came Too Late (1970)
- The Bereaved Child (1970)
- Dorothy Norwood And The O.L.B. Youth Choir (1970)
- The Despondent Wife (1970)
- Dorothy Norwood With Lois Snead And The Medes And Persians Choir (1971)
- Just The Two Of Us (1972)
- Dorothy Norwood And The Var-Son Community Choir (1973)
- The Faithful Daughter (1978)
- The Mountain Climbers (1979)
- God Can (1980)
- Look What They've Done to My Child (1981)
- Jesus Is The Answer (1982)
- Answer Me Dear Jesus (1982)
- Somebody Here Needs A Blessing (1982)
- Up Where We Belong (1983)
- Motherless Child (1985)
- World's Greatest Story Teller (1985)
- Lift Him Up (1985)
- Dorothy Norwood & Friends (1986)
- Dorothy Norwood Live (1991)
- Better Days Ahead (1993)
- Live With The Georgia Mass Choir (1994)
- Shake the Devil Off (1995)
- Hattie B's Daughter (1997)
- The Lord Is a Wonder (1999)
- The Best Of Dorothy Norwood (2000)
- Ole Rickety Bridge (2000)
- Live At Home (2002)
- Stand On the Word (2004)
- Absolutely The Best Of Dorothy Norwood (2006)
- Dorothy Norwood At Her Best (2006)
- Cassietta George (2006)
- No Request (2007)
- Fifty Years It's Been Worth It All (2009)
- Golden Classics (2011)
- God's Been Just That Good (2012)
- An Incredible Journey (2017)
