= Timeline of music in the United States (1920–1949) =

Music in the United States

Timeline of music in the United States
To 1819; 1820–1849; 1850–1879; 1880–1919	1920–1949; 1950–1969; 1970–2000; 2001–present
Music history of the United States
Colonial era – to the Civil War – During the Civil War – Late 19th century – 1900–1940 – 1950s – 1960s – 1970s – 1980s

This is a timeline of music in the United States from 1920 to 1949.

== 1920 ==
- Vaudevillean Mamie Smith records "Crazy Blues" for Okeh Records, the first blues song commercially recorded by an African-American singer, the first blues song recorded at all by an African-American woman, and the first vocal blues recording of any kind, a few months after making the first documented recording by an African-American female singer, "You Can't Keep a Good Man Down" and "That Thing Called Love", which were successful enough for Okeh to commission "Crazy Blues". Stylistically, it resembles other vaudeville music of the era, but it borrows a poetic and melodic form from African-American folk music, as well as elements of unrelated "field-holler" vocal practices. More than its traditional predecessors, this mixture would come to define and epitomize the blues for later generations. The song becomes a surprising commercial success that would open up the market for African-American music by selling more than 8,000 copies a week for several months. It is followed by a string of hits by African-American women singers.
- A paper shortage contributes to a cost increase and a downturn in the sheet music publishing industry.
- Joseph Patek forms a family band that will become one of the longest-lasting and most influential Czech-Texan groups.
- KDKA in Pittsburgh, Pennsylvania claims to be the first radio station with regularly scheduled programs.
- Michigan and Wisconsin organize their first state-sponsored band contests.
- Carl Fischer Music publishes the first full band music scores in the United States.

Early 1920s music trends
- In jazz bands, the cornetist becomes more and more frequently assigned to the melody of a piece, rather than shifting that responsibility among various instrumentalists.
- American audiences begin to turn away from predominantly German classical music towards works by the like of Frenchman Erik Satie and the Russian Alexander Scriabin.
- An organized country music industry begins to evolve, through commercial recording and radio broadcasting.
- Austrian composer Arnold Schoenberg begins advocating serialism, a composition technique that will come to dominate American classical music later in the 20th century.
- The creative peak of jazz in Chicago.
- A printers strike and paper shortage decimates the music publishing industry by raising costs, as customers are beginning to focus more on recordings than sheet music.
- The golden age of the "black female blues singer" begins and ends.
- American public schools begin offering music instruction for band and orchestra.
- The Flanagan Brothers begin recording prolifically with great success. Mike Flanagan is the most popular Irish banjoist of the era.

== 1921 ==
- The Army Music School at Fort Jay is moved to the Army War College in Washington, D.C.
- Eubie Blake and Noble Sissle's Shuffle Along is an influential work in the history of African American theater, re-establishing the black musical theater tradition. It is the first black musical to achieve major success.
- The Norfolk Jazz Quartet begins recording for OKeh, becoming "one of the earliest and most popular group to emerge" from the Tidewater area of Virginia, a fertile region for African-American singing quartets.
- The National Baptist Convention's Gospel Pearls, a compilation of hymns, collected by Lucie Campbell, is released in its second edition, becoming so popular it remains in print, without a new edition, into the 1990s. It is an influential landmark in African-American church music, and is the first use of the term gospel in a collection of songs by a black church to describe the music later known as gospel music.
- Vincent Lopez's dance band makes first live broadcast of a performance on the radio.
- Thomas A. Dorsey moves to Chicago for the second time in his life, this time hoping to make his way in the burgeoning blues and jazz scenes; he is electrified by the singing of W. M. Nix, thus beginning his career as a pioneering gospel singer. He also composes his first song, "If I Don't Get There".
- The Penn Hotel becomes the first African-American-owned hotel in Baltimore; it is on Pennsylvania Avenue, then a major center for black culture and business, and where the Douglass Theater, later more famously known as the Royal Theatre, is opened as one of the finest African-American theaters in the country. The Royal Theatre will become one of the major stops on the black entertainment circuit.
- Canadian-born black composer Robert Nathaniel Dett is the first to arrange a spiritual in a motet, with "Don't Be Weary Traveler", which won the Francis Boott prize, given out by Harvard University.
- W. C. Handy and Harry Pace start Black Swan, the first black-owned record label.
- Paul Gosz forms the Empire Band, which will become one of the major Czech American bands of the Midwest.
- Black Swan Records, founded and led by Harry Pace, becomes the first African-American-owned record label, specializing in what was then known as "race music". Ethel Waters records the label's first hits, "Down Home Blues" and "Oh, Daddy", and will be the label's biggest star.
- Ford Dabney's orchestra ends their eight-year run on Broadway, in the Ziegfeld Midnight Frolic Show at the New Amsterdam Theatre. They are the first "black orchestra to fill such a long engagement".
- OKeh Records becomes the first major record company to realize the commercial potential of the African American market, creating a line, called the Original Race Records with Clarence Williams as director, to produce what was then called race music.
- Thomas A. Edison, Inc. sends out a survey to more than 20,000 phonograph owners, one of the very few primary sources from this era on the characteristics of people who actually listened to recorded music.
- Kid Ory's Sunshine Orchestra becomes the first African-American jazz ensemble to record.
- In Chicago, a group of young white students listen to recordings of the New Orleans Rhythm Kings on a jukebox. They decide to play music in that style, and became known as the Austin High School Gang, consisting of Jimmy McPartland and others.
- Bennie Moten's orchestra becomes the earliest major jazz band in Kansas City.

== 1922 ==
- Eck Robertson and Henry Gilld show up at Victor Records offices, dressed in Confederate Army uniforms, and demand to record their music. The first recording to be released from the subsequent sessions will be Robertson's "Sallie Gooden", which is the first recording of what is now called country music.
- The Four Harmony Kings, a jubilee group, are invited to join the Broadway production of Shuffle Along; they include a version of a spiritual entitled "Ain't It a Shame to Steal on a Sunday".
- Francis La Flesche begins producing an important musicological study of the Osage tribe, entitled The Osage Tribe.
- The Grand Street Follies in Greenwich Village is the first revue "to be controlled largely by women", specifically director Agnes Morgan and composer Lily Hyland. This is the beginning of 'intimate revue', a type of show that is "literate, sophisticated, witty, amusing, satirical, and topical".
- General Pershing creates the United States Army Band, which soon becomes a prominent performing group.
- James D. Vaughan forms a record label to expand the audience for the gospel quartets he manages, an influential point in the early history of the gospel industry.
- The New Orleans Rhythm Kings, the "most significant and influential of the early white jazz bands", record for Gennett, producing records that "had a direct impact on the young white musicians who developed what became known as the 'Chicago Style'."
- OKeh Records begins using the term race music, which soon becomes the standard referent for African-American popular music.
- Trixie Smith, a popular blues singer, recorded "My Man Rocks Me (With One Steady Roll)", one of the earliest uses of the terms rock and roll together in secular music.
- The first Southern radio station to broadcast rural white music is WSB in Atlanta.
- Rural folk performers begin to perform for local radio stations in Atlanta and Fort Worth.
- Kid Ory and his Sunshine Orchestra record "Ory's Creole Trombone" and "Society Blues". These are the first instrumental jazz recording of an African-American group, and marks the beginning of the record industry focusing on "the instrumental ensemble as a source of entertainment in its own right rather than as accompaniment for singers".
- Clarence Jones & His Sunshine Orchestra becomes the first local jazz dance band to broadcast in Chicago.
- A legend states that comedian Ed Wynn is responsible for creating the first studio audience when he refuses to perform without an audience watching.

== 1923 ==
- Spanish folk songs recorded by Charles Fletcher Lummis and transcribed by Arthur Farwell in the mid-1900s are finally published in an anthology called Spanish Songs of Old California.
- Arnold Schoenberg, an innovative experimental composer of the period, begins to be performed more frequently in New York City after this year's production of Pierrot Lunaire.
- Clay Custer's "The Rocks" is the first known recording of a boogie piano bass line.
- Ralph Peer of OKeh records fiddling and singing from Fiddlin' John Carson in Atlanta; he is convinced to release the singing records by a local distributor, and Carson's songs become a surprise hit. This is an important part of the early evolution of country music. Peer thus becomes the first professional talent scout.
- Jelly Roll Morton makes his first recordings, as a jazz band member and as a solo pianist, and begins publishing songs through the Melrose Brothers Music Company. Morton is the "first to perceive and define the distinction between ragtime and jazz, insisting that the latter, whatever its sources or borrowings, was a new type of music that transformed what it absorbed". He is working with the New Orleans Rhythm Kings, the first white Chicago jazz band to record, using a black group (King Oliver's Creole Jazz Band) as a model. Morton's recording with the New Orleans Rhythm Kings constitutes the first "interracial recording sessions".
- King Oliver's Creole Jazz Band, performing at the Lincoln Gardens in Chicago, records with Gennett Studios, resulting in a set of recordings that are "landmark(s) in the history of jazz... the first major set of recordings by black jazz musicians". After this point, the music of "black jazz performers as well as white was preserved and circulated on record."
- The National Association of Broadcasters is formed to be an "intermediary" between ASCAP and the radio broadcasting industry.
- The radio station WBAP in Fort Worth, Texas becomes one of the first to gain an overwhelming response with rural white music, specifically square dance music.
- Canadian-born black composer R. Nathaniel Dett is the first to combine the African-American spiritual with an anthem, with the publication of Listen to the Lambs.
- A new style of popular black-performed blues emerges, consisting of often self-composed songs, accompanied by a piano, exemplified by the work of singers like Clara Smith, Victoria Spivey, Bessie Smith and Ma Rainey. Smith's first recordings, "Down Hearted Blues" and "Gulf Coast Blues", are recorded this year, and becomes a "sensational" success, selling more than ten million copies and turning Smith into the most successful blues singer of the era.
- The success of Fiddlin' John Carson marks the beginning of the development of commercial country music and recorded old-time music.
- George Gershwin accompanies singer Eva Gauthier at a concert that is an "important event in America's musical history" because it helped to bridge the gap between popular and classical music.
- Sylvester Weaver records "Guitar Blues" and "Guitar Rag". These are the first recordings by a male of the blues guitar.
- Fletcher Henderson and Don Redman establish their groups, which is the beginning of the jazz big band tradition.
- Roland Hayes, the first African-American male to "win wide acclaim at home and abroad as a concert artist", gives a recital at Boston's Symphony Hall, which makes the beginning of his "long, illustrious career".
- The first national contest for school bands is held, supported in part by the manufacturers of musical instruments.

== 1924 ==
- The end of the Tin Pan Alley-led fad for blues and blues-like songs among mainstream listeners.
- George Gershwin premiers Rhapsody in Blue, an historically significant piece that fused three strands of American music: modernist classical music, instrumental jazz and popular blues; the piece "played a role in defining American musical modernism" in the 1920s, though it was "probably the most successful work in the movement to bring jazz into the concert hall", it is "better known today through lush arrangements for full symphony orchestras that have necessarily smoothed out the vernacular idiosyncrasies of its original performance style.
- Ed Andrews' "Barrelhouse Blues" is the first recording of rural blues. It is still among the "most popular of American compositions".
- Serge Koussevitzky becomes the conductor of the Boston Symphony Orchestra; under his tenure, he will influentially promote new works by American and European composers.
- The Fletcher Henderson Orchestra, with Louis Armstrong, begins performing at the Roseland Ballroom in Manhattan; this is considered the first big jazz band that used written arrangements to achieve the rhythm and intensity of swing.
- George and Ira Gershwin's Lady, Be Good opens on Broadway; the musical, the duo's first hit, was a "groundbreaking... absorption of Jazz Age lingo (and the composers') felicitous skill at setting vernacular speech to music".
- Herbert Léonard becomes the first known bluesman to record using "first position".
- Juanita Arizona Dranes begins recording for OKeh, making her a "much in-demand artist at black churches and revivals".
- Ma Rainey becomes a wildly popular blues singer across the country, with her band the Jazz Wild Cats.
- The Music Corporation of America is founded by Billy Stein, the first booking agency specializing in popular music performers.
- Ernö Rapée's Motion Picture Moods for Pianists and Organists is an important reference work used by writers to choose music for film.
- The last Big House ceremony among the Delaware Native Americans is held.
- The most popular of the early Lithuanian American performers, Antanas Vanagaitis, comes to the United States with a performance group.
- Immigration Act of 1924 formally enacts a restriction on Japanese immigration that had effectively been in place since 1908; this is said to constitute the end of issei, or the first generation of Japanese immigration. The same bill has similar effects in other communities, making it a common marker separating different forms of immigrant culture and music, such as among Arab Americans.
- Bascom Lamar Lunsford, a regionally famous passionate advocate for Appalachian music, becomes the first person to record old-time banjo music, with "Jesse James" and "I Wish I Was a Mole in the Ground", both for Okeh.
- WLS begins broadcasting National Barn Dance, a popular radio program that exposes new audiences to traditional Southern and Appalachian music. This will become the first major country music radio program, lasting until 1969 (by then broadcast on WGN). Bradley Kincaid is the show's first star; he will later be the first country star to profit from the sale of mail-order songbooks.
- Riley Puckett and Gid Tanner are the first to record country music for Columbia Records, and Puckett became possibly the first to yodel on record, with "Rock All Our Babies to Sleep".
- Rudolf Friml's Rose-Marie is an "immensely successful operetta that (marks) a turning point in the American musical theater". It will be the largest-grossing show until Oklahoma! in the 1940s.
- Vernon Dalhart, one of the first popular country singers, records "Wreck of the Old 97" and "The Prisoner's Song", the latter of which becomes the first country record to sell a million copies. It is the best-selling song of country music's first decade.
- Bix Beiderbecke joins the Wolverine Orchestra, making his first recordings; he will be more influential than any white composer or performer in Chicago in the era, and will be perhaps the first white jazz performer to be widely respected by African-American jazz audiences. Beiderbecke was also the "first important jazzman to be inspired by contemporary classical music". His Wolverine Orchestra is the first white group to play jazz in an authentically African American style.
- James P. Johnson's musical Runnin' Wild introduces the Charleston dance.
- Enric Madriguera becomes director of the Havana Casino Orchestra, and begins introducing the Cuban danzón to American audiences.

== 1925 ==
Mid-1920s music trends
- Henry Ford helps usher in what he refers to as a "square dance revival".
- Scholars and collectors of folk songs become increasingly concerned about the authenticity of the blues they were recording and describing.
- Hall Johnson and Eva Jessye lead a number of professional choirs to fame, bringing media attention to the concert-arranged African-American spiritual.
- Sylvester Weaver, Lonnie Johnson and Papa Charlie Jackson are among a number of male solo vaudeville performers to begin recording attempts at popular blues, but Blind Lemon Jefferson's recordings in 1925 kicked off a wave of like-minded acts.
- Record companies begin recording and marketing to Mexican Americans in California.
- A more traditional sound in Finnish-American commercial recordings supplants the earlier format, which was based around semi-classical performance.
- With the advent of national radio broadcasting companies, large businesses begin to sponsor a single show in its entirety. By 1927, as much as half of the total budget at major advertising companies is spent on radio.
- The Aeolian Company's Pianola, a barrel organ, becomes widespread. The barrel organ will do more to spread musical knowledge in the United States than anything until the gramophone.

- John Harrington Cox, archivist and editor for the West Virginia Folklore Society, publishes a collection of folk songs called Folk-Songs of the South: Collected Under the Auspices of the West Virginia Folk-Lore Society.
- Barn dance programs become a major part of the radio industry, led by the WSM Barn Dance in Nashville, which will later become the Grand Ole Opry. Other barn dance programs during the era are broadcast by WBAP in Fort Worth and WSB in Atlanta.
- Louis Armstrong begins recording with his Hot Five and Hot Seven bands, for OKeh in Chicago. These resulting records are widely influential and establish the early jazz style, and helped launch Armstrong's career, which will eventually make him "one of the best-known and best-loved entertainers in the world". Music historian Richard Crawford has called these recordings "an enduring contribution to music history (that transcend) categorical boundaries to introduce a powerful new, utterly American mode of expression". The recordings establish Armstrong's career as the first virtuoso soloist in jazz, and move the field from one based on collective improvisation among all members of an ensemble to one in which one or more individual performers lead the performance through improvising. The Hot Five was Kid Ory, Johnny Dodds, Lil Hardin and Johnny St Cyr, while the Hot Seven added Pete Briggs and Baby Dodds, replacing Ory with John Thomas.
- Ralph Peers names Al Hopkins' band The Hillbillies, the first documented usage of the word hillbilly in a Southern rural musical context.
- Lonnie Johnson begins his performing career after winning first prize at a blues concert. He will become "probably the first improvising guitarist to base his style on cleanly articulated single-string lines rather than heavily strummed chords"
- Paul Robeson performs at a critically acclaimed concert, his debut, as a bass baritone, in Greenwich Village; his performance is the first "program consisting entirely of Negro spirituals".
- Bennie Moten's territory band releases "South", a classic hit recording that helps establish the band's career as one of the most successful and prolifically recording territory band.
- Fred Waring & the Pennsylvanians release a hit recording called "Collegiate", in a style associated with both jazz and the then-prominent flapper culture.
- James Weldon Johnson's Book of Negro Spirituals is an important reference work that contains clues "about how long and how pervasive the penchant for harmonizing was among African Americans".
- The Scopes Trial is discussed in a ballad, whose broadside is sold outside the courthouse during the trial, selling more than 60,000 copies. Music historian claims that this publication brought the broadside up to date for the new media of the time.
- The first African-American preacher to be recorded is Calvin P. Dixon.
- Charles Henry Pace forms the Pace Jubilee Singers, which become the first to record both Pace's songs and those composed by Charles Albert Tindley.
- The Yugoslavian Tamburitza Orchestra is founded by the Popovich Brothers; it will come to popularize the tambura throughout the United States.
- Florence Price is the first female African American to gain international renown as a composer, winning her first of two Holstein Awards this year.
- Charlie Poole leads a group recording several songs, most successfully including "Deal", which will inspire numerous rural performers to imitate this repertoire and three-finger banjo style.
- Dock Walsh becomes one of the first to record three-finger banjo picking.
- Students at the Moody Bible Institute broadcast the first gospel music on the radio, on student station WNBL.
- George Antheil's Ballet mécanique is finished; it was intended to accompany a Fernand Léger film, but was later adapted into a complete composition, using "eight pianos, pianola, eight xylophones, two electric doorbells, percussion, wind machine, and 'airplane propellor', (described as) 'an adapted fan with a forty-eight-inch reach, six vicious blades, and a capacity of 4,000 revolutions per minute'". The piece will make Antheil "internationally notorious". The work may also be the "first use of (long periods of silence) for all instruments".
- Blind Lemon Jefferson begins making his first recordings, for Paramount Records, which include his first two hits, "Booster Blues" and "Dry Southern Blues". He will become "one of the most important and influential of the early bluesmen", and his success will inspire record companies to search for more authentically rural styles of the blues.
- The American Society of Ancient Instruments is founded by Ben Stad, a Dutch violinist, in Philadelphia. It is the "first American ensemble known to have performed on period instruments". The original ensemble included a harpsichord, viols, Baroque violins and cellos.
- Roba Stanley becomes the first woman to record a solo country song, her most popular this year being "Single Life".
- Sam Wooding & His Orchestra begin performing outside the United States. Wooding will become one of Philadelphia's first internationally prominent jazz musician, and he will be the first African American to tour with a jazz band outside the country, and the first American to play jazz in the Soviet Union, tour South America and record in Europe.
- Ernest Van "Pop" Stoneman's "The Titanic" is one of the first major hits of what is now called country music. In this same year, Al Hopkins & the Hill Billies become the first country recording artists to record in New York, make a short film, base themselves in Washington, D.C., play for a president (Calvin Coolidge) and use a piano and Hawaiian guitar.

== 1926 ==
- The dispute between theater owners who play music during silent films and the American Society for Composers, Authors and Publishers over the fees paid for the use of popular songs ends with the joining of more than 11,000 owners to the Society, pay more than $500,000 in fees. The dispute had severely limited the use of pop Tin Pan Alley songs in theaters.
- The first permanent orchestra is established in Seattle.
- Serge Koussevitzky leads the Boston Symphony Orchestra in the "first live network concert", presented by NBC.
- Jelly Roll Morton forms the Red Hot Peppers and records for Victor, resulting in an "epic" set of recordings, particularly notable for "one of the best rhythm sections in early jazz".
- Men begin to dominate recordings of blues music, after women have been the most common recording performer since 1920.
- John Dopyera and his brothers invent the Dobro guitar in response to requests for a louder instrument.
- The Soul Stirrers, the "real creators of the modern gospel sound", is formed by Roy Crain in Trinity, Texas.
- Gid Tanner & His Skillet Lickers become the first successful old-time string band.
- Ernö Rapée's "Charmaine", the theme song for the film What Price Glory?, is a major hit, one of the first such written expressly for a film.
- NBC, the first of the major broadcasting networks, is created.
- Arizona Dranes begins recording, soon becoming one of the "most celebrated pioneers of the Holiness-Pentecostal" gospel style.
- Several popular songs by vaudeville singer Blind Lemon Jefferson kicks off a wave of solo male folk-blues artists recording commercially. Jefferson is believed to become the first to record a slide guitar in this year.
- The New York city council enacts a set of restrictions on music performance, intending to crack down on cabarets. The restrictions hamper the city's musical life until their repeal in 1988.
- The Los Angeles newspaper Rafu Shimpo begins documenting Japanese music in that city.
- New York's Savoy Ballroom opens, with Chick Webb as bandleader. It will become a major jazz venue, and Webb will reign "over the birth of such dances as the Lindy Hop and the Susie Q".
- Eva Jessye moves to New York, where she will soon become a fixture in the city's musical life, eventually becoming the "first black woman to win international distinction as a professional choral conductor".
- The Carnegie Corporation purchases an extensive collection of books on African-American culture from Arthur Schomburg. The collection will become the cases for the New York Public Library's Schomburg Collection of Negro Literature and History, the "most famous collection of books on black in the world".
- Louis Armstrong's "Heebie Jeebies" is a notable early example of scat vocals in jazz.
- The first recordings of solo gospel guitar are made by Blind Joe Taggart.
- The first jazz concert is held in Chicago at the Coliseum.
- The National School Band Association is founded.
- The O'Byrne DeWitt House, an Irish music store in Boston, is opened by Ellen and Joshua O'Byrne DeWitt. Ellen, much to the consternation of some Bostonians, was the manager and namesake of the store. She will soon approach Columbia Records about recording Irish American music, the success of which inspires many record companies to expand into Irish and other ethnic folk musics in the United States.
- Stamps-Baxter is formed from the merger of two publishing companies. It will soon be one of the dominating forces in the white Southern Gospel industry.
- The song "There's a New Star in Heaven Tonight" by Jimmy McHugh, Irving Mills and J. Keirn Brennan, written about Rudolph Valentino, is the first popular song to refer to a star in the celebrity sense.

== 1927 ==
- Carl Sandburg publishes The American Songbag. He, along with compatriots like Edna Thomas, will become among the first major American urban folk performers.
- The United Booking Office of America on the East Coast combines with the Orpheum Circuit in the West.
- The second major radio network, CBS, is formed, followed by several minor regional networks, the Yankee Network and Don Lee Network among them.
- OKeh executive Ralph Peer records a wave of old-time musicians after letting it slip that Pop Stoneman had earned more than three thousand dollars in royalties the previous year; among those who come to seek their own fortune are the Carter Family, who will become wildly popular in the burgeoning country music industry, and Jimmie Rodgers, who was the most influential figure in what was then known as hillbilly music. These legendary recording sessions are often considered the historical foundation for country music. Peer's codified the standard contractual arrangements between music publishers and performers with regards to session fees and songwriting remuneration.
- Roger Pryor Dodge begins transcribing the jazz solos; these transcriptions will be performed onstage, proving "that a sympathetic reading of hot solos from notation... lost nothing of the intrinsic beauty of the melodic line".
- Carl McVicker, Sr., a trumpeter, begins teaching at Westinghouse High School in Pittsburgh. He will teach Erroll Garner, Ahmad Jamall, Billy Strayhorn and Mary Lou Williams, all of whom help establish Pittsburgh as a center for the piano and home for many of the country's top pianists.
- Bix Beiderbecke makes a series of recordings with Frank Trumbauer; though Beiderbecke would remain fairly obscure during his lifetime, he will go on to be remembered as perhaps the first "legendary jazz musician". This reputation will be helped by the fact that he was white, rather than black, as were most respected jazz musicians of the time.
- Hamilton Sisters and Fordyce, variety entertainers/singers, later known as Three X Sisters credited as being one of the best American stage performer's of this year. Travel to England with Henry Levine, a later addition of the Original Dixieland Jass Band, and Rudy Vallee. They sign with BBC radio for two years. Record early Gershwin and Rogers and Hart songs with the Savoy Orpheans, Bert Ambrose, and pianist Billy Meryl. Tour with the Savoy Havana Band.
- Henry Cowell founds the quarterly periodical New Music, which helped expose, introduce and organize European and Russian music to American composers.
- Jerome Kern's musical Show Boat is a "watershed (that leaves) earlier, more loosely constructed musicals far behind". Its major innovation is in using a well-developed plot, based on a novel by Edna Ferber, rather than appealing primarily in showy dancing, sets and catchy songs. It has been called the "first great American musical show".
- Blind Willie Johnson, one of the most legendary of blues singers, records for the first time.
- Jim Jackson's "Kansas City Blues" becomes one of the biggest early blues hits; both its melody and lyrics would influence later rhythm and blues and rock and roll records.
- The Federal Radio Commission is formed to regulate the fledgling radio industry.
- The WSM Barn Dance is renamed the Grand Ole Opry, which will become one of the major country music shows.
- Duke Ellington's career begins when he is hired a whites-only nightclub called the Cotton Club in Harlem. He will go on to develop one of the most distinctive styles in early jazz, combining elements of "sweet" dance bands, ragtime, stride and other genres. Trumpeter Bubber Miley creates a "growling" sound that becomes a characteristic element of Ellington's style, an element later adapted for the trombone by Tricky Sam Nanton.
- Flautist Alberto Socarras comes to New York, where he will become an important part of jazz history by bringing Afro-Cuban musical elements to the American jazz scene.
- A recording of "Blue Ridge Mountain Blues" by Al Hopkins & His Buckle Busters may be the first recording of twin fiddles in the field then known as hillbilly music, though the song is now considered an early classic of bluegrass.
- Arthur Smith begins performing for WBT, going on to become one of the most successful and innovative fiddlers of the era, the first to record the fiddle for listening rather than dancing.
- The Jazz Singer becomes the first motion picture with sound, beginning the connection between music and cinema. The film sets a historical precedent for the commercializing potential of a music star in a movie.
- The composer George Antheil is the subject of a concert, billed as "The Biggest Musical Event of the Year", and promoted by Ezra Pound and Donald Friede, which features his ultramodern works, ending with the "presumptive piece de resistance", Ballet mécanique, which turns out to be a "colossal flop". One review said that no piece had ever "(flopped) to earth with a more sickening and merited thud".
- Meade Lux Lewis records "Honky Tonk Train Blues", the first boogie woogie hit and an enduring classic of the piano blues.
- A major flood in Mississippi will become one of the most musically notable natural disasters in American history, subject of many blues and gospel songs, most famously Charley Patton's "High Water Everywhere" and Elder Edwards' "The 1927 Flood". This year's "Explosion in the Fairmount Mines" by Blind Alfred Reed, referring to a mining accident in West Virginia that resulted in more than 300 deaths, is perhaps the most popular of many songs about mining disasters released during this era.
- The Harry Fox Agency is founded to administer the royalties from mechanical rights, such as in the sale of piano rolls and gramophone records.
- The first car manufactured in the United States with a radio installed is created.

== 1928 ==
Late 1920s music trends
- Louis Armstrong becomes one of the most renowned and iconic figures in the world of jazz. His work during this period is a synthesis of African American folk song, the music of the cabarets and the veneration of virtuosity in the Chicago music scene.
- With the rise of talking pictures, the first movie musicals are released.
- The term skiffle comes into vogue to describe the blues played by jug bands.
- Interest in traditional American square dances peaks.
- Woody Guthrie spends time performing in Pampas, Texas, where he is exposed to Mexican and Tejano music. He will leave lasting influences on American folk and country music from these fields.
- The Communist International officially defines jazz as a "proletarian music", leading to an association between jazz and leftist politics in the United States.
- Jackson, Mississippi music store owner H. C. Speir becomes a talent scout for all the major record labels, and will be responsible for signing many of the major Mississippi bluesmen who will become famous later in the century.
- Spanish-language radio broadcasting begins, targeting Mexican Americans in California.
- A large accordion with twenty-one buttons and double rows becomes the standard equipment in the Tejano conjunto.
- Pianist Mary Lou Williams begins her professional performing career. She will be the first woman to be fully accepted in jazz circles.
- Both Italian American theater and vaudeville cease to dominate the musical life of Italian Americans.
- Viola Turpeinen begins recording commercially, making her the most successful of the early Finnish American entertainers.
- Though polka had commonly been performed in urban areas of the East and Midwest, the earliest organized, large polka bands are formed in this era.
- Mac and Bob, performers on the WLS radio station, popularize a style of duet singing accompanied by mandolin and guitar.
- Walt Disney begins releasing a series of cartoons, which will include the Silly Symphony series and Steamboat Willie, which are collectively one of the major elements in early film scores.
- A wave of influential blues performers move to urban areas, especially Chicago, from the rural South. These include Memphis Minnie, Scrapper Blackwell and Leroy Carr.
- Most radio broadcasting switches from locally produced material to nationally broadcast network programming, causing a decrease in the diversity of music on American radio.\
- Variety shows, a mixture of music, light entertainment and vocal music, becomes the most popular form of radio program in the country, led by the show of Ed Cantor.

- Amos 'n' Andy becomes the first radio show sold on transcription, meaning recorded onto a disc rather than broadcast.
- The Archive of American Folk Song is founded at the Library of Congress, set up by Robert Winslow Gordon.
- Ethel Waters' "Do What You Did Last Night" contains the first use of the word signifyin' in a record.
- Joseph and Cleoma Breaux Falcon record "Allons a Lafayette", a major hit that marks the beginning of the commercial recording of Cajun music.
- Leo Soileau begins recording, soon becoming one of the most renowned Cajun fiddlers.
- Walt Disney's Steamboat Willie introduces Mickey and Minnie Mouse. The movie is "made to a metronome's beat", with rhythmic energy pulsating "through the assortment of whistles, cowbells, and tin pans featured in the sound track."
- W. C. Handy stages a landmark all-African-American concert at Carnegie Hall, one of the first concerts of its kind.
- Bascom Lamar Lunsford, a lawyer in Asheville, North Carolina organizes a folk festival, the Mountain Dance and Folk Festival, that will mark the beginning of many similar celebrations and concerts throughout the country.
- Edgar Varese founds the Pan American Association of Composers.
- A report by the North Central Association for Teacher Education provides the impetus for school systems giving students credit for performing in school bands, orchestras and choruses.
- "Follow de Drinkin' Gou'd", a publication by the Texas Folklore Society, includes an article by H. B. Parks concerning a song entitled "Follow the Drinking Gourd", which had been used to communicate safe escape routes to the North to slaves before the Civil War. J. Frank Dobie, editor and historian, calls it the "most original contribution ever printed by the society".
- The Savoy Ballroom opens in Chicago, soon becoming the premier African-American music venue in the city.
- The Silver Leaf Quartette's "Sleep On, Mother" introduces a new technique to African-American singing quartets, in which the lead "vocalist... apart from the remaining voices, which (supply) a repeating rhythmic pattern or riff", allowing the Quartette to develop the use of nonsense syllables as a rhythmic device (the clanka-lanka technique).
- The Silver Leaf Quartette and the Norfolk Jubilee Quartet begin performing on radio in Norfolk, Virginia, helping them grow and maintain an audience in the region even after most record companies go bankrupt during the Great Depression.
- The first summer music camp, the National High School Orchestra Camp, is founded by Joseph Maddy in Interlochen, Michigan.
- George Herzog is the first musicological scholar to identify the "rise", the "formal device of including repeated or new melodic material sung at a higher pitch level than the opening phrases of a song", which his research showed was characteristic of the Mohave and Diegueño Native Americans; Bruno Nettl will later conclude that it is distinctive to most of the California region. This research established the basis for the modern study of music areas, the distribution of musical traits across a region.
- Recordings by Tampa Red, Georgia Tom, Scrapper Blackwell and Leroy Carr popularize an urban style of piano and guitar-based music. This year's "How Long How Long Blues" by Carr and Blackwell proves especially influential.
- Tampa Red, with Thomas A. Dorsey, kickstarts the hokum craze with "Tight Like That".
- The Army Music School is closed, and not replaced until 1941.
- Bascom Lamar Lunsford founds the Mountain Dance and Folk Festival in Asheville, North Carolina; it will become a major regional institution, and the longest running folk music festival in the country.
- Bradley Kincaid publishes a songbook entitled My Favorite Mountain Ballads and Old-Time Songs, a popular collection that will help "keep alive the kind of mountain songs that (are) fast disappearing from the American musical landscape".
- Duke Ellington's "Creole Love Call" features a "wordless solo" by Adelaide Hall, which is the first "use of the voice as an instrument" in jazz.
- The first recordings in Nashville, Tennessee are made by Victor Records.

== 1929 ==
- The first commercially sponsored radio broadcast features Leopold Stokowski and his orchestra.
- Henry Cowell becomes the leader of the Pan American Association of Composers, which he uses to help introduce European concert hall techniques to American composers.
- Pine Top Smith's "Pine Top's Boogie Woogie" inspires a wave of recordings that begin to popularize boogie-woogie, a style of piano-based popular blues that can be traced back to the 1910s. The first use of the term boogie woogie as a genre comes this year.
- Blind Roosevelt Graves and brother Uaroy, are recorded by Paramount Records; researcher Gayle Dean Wardlow has stated that their song "Crazy About My Baby", a rhythmic country blues, "could be considered the first rock 'n' roll recording".
- Los Madrugadores, a Mexican-Californian trio, begins recording, becoming the most commercially successful group in the field.
- Omer Marcoux, the best-known fiddler in the French-New England tradition, emigrates from Quebec to New Hampshire, beginning his American career.
- Hallelujah becomes the first African-American musical film, written and directed by King Vidor, while The Broadway Melody is the first musical produced entirely in Hollywood.
- Fats Waller's "Ain't Misbehavin'" is a popular single and influential recording. Waller will play a major role in jazz, and will be the first in that field to "master both the pipe organ and the Hammond organ".
- Will Vodery becomes the first African-American arranger and musical director for a film production studio, Fox Films.
- The Mills Brothers become the first black group with a commercial sponsorship deal on a major network, CBS.
- E. F. Goldman founds the American Bandmasters Association.
- Hoagy Carmichael's "Star Dust" is an extraordinarily sentimental ballad, selling millions of copies and being recorded hundreds of times in dozens of arrangements and languages.
- The National School Band and Orchestra Association is founded.
- The first advertising jingle is a barbershop quartet recording from Minneapolis, used to promote Wheaties cereal.
- The first major black entertainer on a major radio network is Jack L. Cooper of WSBC in Chicago, who hosts a music and comedy show.
- Warner Brothers purchases M. Witmark & Sons, a music publishing firm. Though this is not the first film company to incorporate a music publishing business, the purchase is a major event that signals Hollywood's new approach to the use of music in films.

== 1930 ==
- A. A. Harding begins a series of instructional clinics for bandmasters, eventually becomes known as the "dean of university band directors".
- Jazz musicians begin "basing their improvisations chiefly on harmony, so that after an opening melodic statement only the piece's harmonic pattern mattered."
- Kansas City jazz has developed, led by Bennie Moten's band.
- A performance of Thomas A. Dorsey's "If You See My Savior" causes a stir at the National Baptist Convention in Chicago, a pivotal event in the development of African-American gospel music and an impetus for Dorsey's success as a composer. Gospel is first publicly endorsed by the Convention this year, a date sometimes figured as the beginning of gospel history.
- One of the earliest Latin hits is "El manicero" by Don Azpiazu; the song is covered, as "The Peanut Vendor", by many popular American artists.
- Manuel Acuña emigrates from Mexico to California, where he will become one of the leading musical directors in the Mexican-California music industry.
- One of the most popular performers of Peking opera in history, Mei Lanfang, visits the United States, bringing that tradition to North America.
- Henry Cowell publishes New Musical Resources, which is "probably the earliest comprehensive statement of intent by a 'modernistic' American composer (and) and indispensable document in the history of American music".
- With "Mood Indigo", Duke Ellington becomes "increasingly innovative... in his use of chromaticism and bitonal harmonies, as well as in the temporal extension of his compositions".
- Ken Maynard is the first vocalist marketed as a "singing cowboy".
- Paul Whiteman works on King of Jazz, one of the first musical talking films.
- The first chair of musicology in an American university is founded at Cornell, led by Otto Kinkeldy.
- Phillips Barry, one of the most important folk song collectors of the era, especially known for his work in New England, becomes the editor of the Bulletin of the Folk-Song Society of the Northeast.
- The Society of European Stage Authors and Composers is formed to collection royalties from American productions of European shows.
- Warner Brothers purchases Brunswick Records, the beginning of Hollywood's relationship with the recording industry.

Early 1930s music trends
- The creative peak of jazz in Kansas City, as the "city becomes a magnet for black musicians", including touring bands from across the country, Delta and urban blues singers, and jazzmen from New Orleans and elsewhere. Major characteristics of the Kansas City jazz style include the use of repeated riffs, "short melodic ideas – repeated again and again by the full ensemble, often in unison by the brasses and sometimes by the rhythm section to support solo improvisation", and the accenting of all four beats equally, rather than the first and third as in New Orleans jazz. The Kansas City style also influences the blues, which becomes "lustier and more powerful".
- Eva Jessye becomes one of the first "professional female choral conductors, black or white, in the United States", leading a choir on NBC and CBS.
- Chicago becomes the center for the blues record industry.
- Frank Sinatra begins performing; he will go on to become one of the first musical superstars and the first teen idol, and inspires a legion of Italian American performers.
- The end of the golden age of Finnish American entertainment, which was dominated by solo troubadours.
- Richard Ranger begins work on an organ, using photoelectric cells. This is one of the earliest electronic instruments created in the United States.
- Benjamin F. Miessner patents an electric piano, several models of which begin going into production in about 1935.

- Charles Davis Tillman sings his "Life's Railway to Heaven" coast-to-coast on the NBC Radio Network. He had originally published the song in 1910.

== 1931 ==
- A. D. Blumlein develops the principles behind stereo recording.
- William Grant Still's Symphony No. 1 "Afro-American" is premiered by the Rochester Philharmonic Orchestra, conducted by Howard Hanson; this is the "first time... that a major orchestra had performed a black composer's symphony", and the first symphony to incorporate blues and jazz.
- The Mills Brothers are the first to use jazz instrumentation and orchestration in the singing of an African-American quartet.
- Opera is broadcast on the radio for the first time in the United States.
- The Rickenbacker A22 and A25 models are among the first commercially marketed electric guitars.
- John Tasker Howard's Our American Music is published; it is the only general history of American music written during the era. His work focused on Americans who composed in European styles.
- Max Steiner's score for the film Cimarron garners favorable reviews, and helps move the motion picture industry towards accepting music as a film element equal to speech and sound effects in importance.
- Don Redmans makes his first recordings, which are credited to Harold Lattimore & His Connie's Inn Orchestra. Redman, who formerly wrote the arrangements of Fletcher Henderson, will be the first black bandleader to host his own radio program.
- Alfred Newman's symphonic jazz main title arrangement for the film Street Scene is the first "nonvocal film music issued... as sheet music for sale to the public" in the United States.
- Myles O'Malley signs with Decca Records, which is expanding into ethnic folk music; O'Malley will soon become known as the Irish "Tin Whistle King".
- The Light Crust Doughboys of Fort Worth begin recording; their work is a major impetus in the development of Western swing.
- Ruth Crawford's string quartet is "much-admired", and helps make her the "first American woman composer to be recognized as a significant member of the avant-garde".
- Mildred Bailey, the first "female to sing with a (jazz) band", and the vocalist for Paul Whiteman's band, records "I Like to Do Things for You" with Frankie Trumbauer".
- George and Ira Gershwin's Of Thee I Sing is a big success, their first in the "political-satirical genre" of musical theater.
- Otto Harbach and Jerome Kern's The Cat and the Fiddle is a "trendsetter" toward "more consistent plots, fuller characterizations, and a wider range of musical style" in American theater.
- Sarah Gertrude Knott organizes the first National Folk Festival.
- William Llewellyn Wilson is the principal cellist at the debut of the City Colored Orchestra in Baltimore, conducted by A. Jack Thomas. Wilson will go on to become a long-term fixture in the African-American Baltimore music scene. He is said to have, at one point, taught every music teacher in the Baltimore school system, as well as Cab and Blanche Calloway.
- Thomas A. Dorsey and Theodore Frye organize the first gospel choirs, at Chicago's Ebenezer Baptist Church. With Magnolia Lewis Butts, Dorsey and Frye also organize the Chicago Gospel Choral Union.
- Katherine Dunham organizes the Ballet Negre, establishing the African-American concert dance tradition.
- The Music Library Association is founded.
- Gems from 'The Bandwagon' is one of the first albums of new material.

== 1932 ==
- American composer Aaron Copland visits a Mexico City dance hall, and is inspired to begin the composition of El Salón México, which used Mexican melodies and other musical elements.
- The World's Largest Make-Believe Ballroom, among the earliest radio programs to play recorded rather than live music, begins broadcasting, launched by Al Jarvis.
- ASCAP comes to an agreement with the National Association of Broadcasters to collect licensing fees for radio airplay. Many broadcasters and music publishers disagree with the agreement.
- The Reverend J. H. L. Smith takes the influential Ebenezer Baptist Church in Chicago in a Pentecostal direction, featured Southern-style music in a new choir directed by Theodore Frye and accompanied by gospel composer Thomas A. Dorsey. Dorsey will open the Dorsey House of Music, the "first music publishing company founded for the sole purpose of selling the music of black gospel composers".
- Zora Neale Hurston's revue, The Great Day, is staged for the first time in New York, aiming to "show what beauty and appeal there (is) in genuine Negro material, as against the Broadway concept".
- Thomas A. Dorsey and Willie Mae Ford Smith found the National Convention of Gospel Choirs and Choruses, with Mahalia Jackson, Magnolia Lewis Butts, Theodore Frye and Sallie Martin. The organization will inspire a number of similar groups, the most successful of which will be the James Cleveland Gospel Music Workshop of America, which will be founded in 1969.
- Three X Sisters record with Isham Jones, Eddie Duchin, reserve their knew career primarily as trio harmony singers. Tour with Paul Specht, and sign with CBS radio.
- Franklin Delano Roosevelt's presidential campaign uses the song "Happy Days Are Here Again", which will become associated with the Democratic Party afterwards.
- The radio station WSM switches to a higher-power system, expanding the reach of the fledgling show Grand Ole Opry.
- J. R. Brinkley opens XERA, the first Mexican border radio station (X station) created to promote a product, in this case, Brinkley's promise to boost male virility through goat glands.
- Canadian-born black composer R. Nathaniel Dett is the first to combine the African-American spiritual with the cantata, publishing The Ordering of Moses.
- Shirley Graham becomes the first female African American to gain fame composing operas and librettos, beginning with Tom-Tom, which is first produced in Cleveland and possibly the first "black opera produced on a grandiose scale with a professional cast".
- Bird of Paradise is credited with helping to sustain popularity for Hawaiian music, and Hawaii-themed stage and film productions.
- Max Steiner's score for Symphony of Six Million is "one of the first to include substantial amounts of music under dialogue".
- A revue called New Americana features a hit song, "Brother, Can You Spare a Dime?", which will become viewed as the "theme song of the Depression".
- Don Redman's jazz band becomes the first African-American group to "have a sponsored radio series", by the Chipso Soap Company.
- Fats Waller broadcasts Fats Waller's Rhythm Club over WLW in Cincinnati. He is the best known of the Harlem-based jazz pianists, and the first to "adapt the style of jazz pianism to the pipe organ and the Hammond organ".
- Almost twenty formerly independent piano manufacturers are combined by the merger of the Aeolian Company and the American Piano Corporation, creating the Aeolian American Corporation.
- Love Me Tonight is among the earliest innovative musical films.

== 1933 ==
- John Lomax finds support from Macmillan Publishers and Carl Engel at the Library of Congress, for a collection of American folk songs. With his son Alan, John records a wide variety of folk music, much of it collected from African Americans at prisons and work camps. They also discover the pioneering blues musician Lead Belly. This recording trip helped inspire the American roots revival, and took the Lomaxes to Texas, Mississippi, Virginia, Louisiana, Georgia, Kentucky and Florida.
- Fred Astaire begins working with Ginger Rogers, leading to a partnership that will establish the dance musical format.
- The Dorsey House of Music is founded; it is the first publishing company to focus on African-American gospel music.
- Max Steiner's score to King Kong is an important composition by a European composer working in Hollywood.
- Though the tune to "To Anacreon in Heaven" had been used as accompaniment to "The Star-Spangled Banner" for many years, it had been unofficial until a Congressional act this year.
- Coleman Hawkins, Ben Webster, Herschel Evans and Lester Young participate in "the most famous cutting contest in all of jazz history", with the end result being an increase in popularity for the light, melodic sound of Lester Young as opposed to the more heavy vibrato sound of Coleman Hawkins.
- Engineer Edwin Armstrong first demonstrates the possibility of FM radio.
- "Echale Salsita", a recording by Ignacio Piñeiro, is the first known use of the word salsa in a musical context; it will eventually come to denote a specific form of Latin-North American popular music known as salsa.
- Ernest Bloch's Avodat Hakodesh is a landmark composition of Jewish religious music.
- The American Society for Comparative Musicology is founded.
- John J. Becker conducts a concert with the St. Paul Chamber Orchestra, which was "historic in that it brought to the Midwest the first presentation of an advancing trend in the creative originality of contemporary American music", the avant-garde.
- Hall Johnson's Run, Little Chillun becomes the first production of an African-American folk opera on Broadway.
- Florence Price, the first African American to "achieve distinction as a composer", has her Wanamaker Prize-winning Symphony in E minor debuted by the Chicago Symphony Orchestra at the Chicago World's Fair.
- Lester Young joins Count Basie's band, beginning his career. He will be the first major jazz saxophonist, helping make that instrument an integral an iconic part of jazz, and will establish the saxophone as an instrument capable of creating a unique style, rather than merely accompanying the other instruments or playing in a manner derivative of Louis Armstrong.
- The end of Prohibition leads to a rise in clubs, juke joints and honky tonks, many of which feature live music or jukeboxes.
- Hostility towards the local musicians union in Chicago, led by James C. Petrillo, grows so harsh the union's windows are bulletproofed. Petrillo has led the union a series of major strikes.

== 1934 ==
Mid-1930s music trends
- The era of greatest success for commercially recorded jubilee quartets begins.
- Ballroom-style polka becomes the dominant form of the music among Polish-American communities.

- The first permanent orchestra is established in Kansas City.
- The Metropolitan Opera forms an Opera Guild to sponsor informative lectures, organize inexpensive concerts for children and involve other organizations in fundraising efforts.
- Alan and John Lomax went on a music recording trip to the South, in search of music among the blacks who "had had the least contact with jazz, the radio, and with the white man". One of their recording subjects was Lead Belly, who then accompanied the Lomax's on a renowned tour of college campuses. This tour would help inspire the American folk revival of the mid-20th century.
- Bob Wills begins performing in Tulsa, Oklahoma, establishing his career in the evolving field of Western swing.
- The Music Supervisors National Conference changes its name to the Music Educators National Conference.
- John Collier, Commissioner of Indian Affairs, introduces the Indian Reorganization Act, which gives legal sanction to tribal holdings and promotes native culture, including music and dance.
- The Federal Communications Commission is formed to regulate the radio industry, replacing the Federal Radio Commission.
- Lloyd Loar and Lewis A. Williams form the Acousti-Lectric Co. to manufacture pickups and later, electric guitars.
- The American Musicological Society is founded.
- Benny Goodman buys the compositions and arrangements of Fletcher Henderson, a well-known black bandleader, then uses them in Let's Dance, an NBC radio show, the following year; this is, for many in the mostly white audience, their first exposure to swing music. Goodman becomes the first white bandleader to be considered a jazz master.
- Sarah Gertrude Knott founds the National Folk Festival, the longest-lasting music festival of its kind.
- The Callahan Brothers, the first brother duet in country music, are the first to record a duet yodel, for the American Record Company.
- The Oglala Sioux tribal council takes over the management of the traditional Sun Dance, turning it into a tourist attraction through advertising and make the calendrical date permanent.
- Mildred Bailey records with Coleman Hawkins and Benny Goodman's band. She will become the "first white female to be completely accepted in jazz circles".
- Lydia Mendoza begins her solo career, soon becoming one of the most influential performers of Tejano music in her era.
- Roy Harris' First Symphony premiers with the Boston Symphony Orchestra, directed by Koussevitsky who call it the "first truly tragic symphony by an American".
- Virgil Thomson's Four Saints in Three Acts is the first opera with a black cast presented on Broadway. It is perceived as "electrifying (and) shocking" by opera critics, for it flouted many of the conventions of the genre.
- The early jazz periodical Down Beat begins to be published. Many similar jazz-oriented magazine appeared in this era; these are arguably the first popular music fanzines.
- Kenneth Morris begins working for the gospel publisher Lillian E. Bowles, where he will give gospel its "second infusion of jazz". Morris will later found one of the largest gospel publishing companies in the world.
- Asadata Dafora's Kykuntor is produced in New York; it is the first African ballet-opera.
- Pioneering steel guitarist Bob Dunn becomes the first country musician to use an electrified instrument.

== 1935 ==
- The Works Progress Administration's Federal Project Number One establishes the Federal Music Project to help unemployed musicians, which was then estimated to be about 70% of all musicians in the country. The project will employ 16,000 people, fund twenty-eight symphony orchestras teach music classes to more than fourteen million people.
- "Big band jazz enters "the public consciousness... when a white dance band led by clarinetist Benny Goodman played at the Palomar Ballroom in Los Angeles"; this has been "credited with launching the Swing Era, a new age of popular music". Goodman will become "internationally acclaimed as both solo performer and bandleader".
- Martin Block's Make Believe Ballroom on WNEW in New York City becomes the first "noteworthy DJ"-centered radio program.
- The Bureau of Navigation founds the United States Navy School of Music to train instrumentalists and bandleaders in the Navy.
- George Gershwin's Porgy and Bess premiers on Broadway; the "folk opera" was an innovative piece that mixed African-American music with techniques from the musical theater and American popular song. It is the first distinctively American opera.
- Major Bowes' Original Amateur Hour is first broadcast on NBC, becoming a tremendous success and the beginning of the music talent show.
- The Rickenbacker Electro Spanish is among the first electric Spanish guitars introduced.
- Song pluggers, who work to promote popular songs, form a fraternal organization called Professional Music Men
- The Golden Gate Jubilee Quartet begins performing on WBT, a powerful radio station in Charlotte, North Carolina, creating a new style of African-American vocal music.
- An interracial group, consisting of Benny Goodman, Teddy Wilson and Gene Krupa, plays at the Congress Hotel in Chicago, the first such group to play in a large commercial venue.
- Ethnomusicologist George Herzog identifies the "main stylistic identifier" of the Native Americans of the Great Basin, the paired phrasing of the melody and text of each of the phrases that constitute the piece.
- Narciso Martínez's polka "La chicharronera" becomes a "big hit", and an "instant and lasting success" that set the foundation for the American conjunto style.
- The Soul Stirrers form. They will establish "most of the practices of the modern gospel quartet style", including the addition of a fifth man and guitar accompaniment.
- Smith College founds the first "American series of scholarly music editions", the Smith College Music Archives, beginning with violin sonatas by Francesco Geminiani.
- The Old Fiddler's Convention in Galax, Virginia is founded. It will become the most significant fiddlers gathering, and the largest and oldest old-time music festival, in the country.
- Lulubelle and Scotty begin their career with the National Barn Dance; they will soon become popular music staples, and the first major husband-wife duo in country music history.
- The Gibson guitar company begins producing electric guitars with the ES-150, a Spanish guitar, introduced this year or the following year. Its pickup, designed by Walt Fuller, will become known as the Charlie Christian pickup once the jazz performer Charlie Christian popularizes the guitar model. Around the same time, Gibson began producing electric lap steel guitars.
- NBC'sYour Hit Parade is the first radio music chart shows.
- Walter S. Lemmon founds WRUL, near Boston. This is the predecessor of the Voice of America radio network.

== 1936 ==
- Al Dexter's "Honky Tonk Blues" is perhaps the first country song to use the term honky tonk in its title.
- Count Basie's orchestra gains a national following, the first major jazz band from Kansas City. He also developed a "new, stripped-down style that would remain his signature for the rest of his career".
- The influential gospel singer Roberta Martin begins performing with the Frye-Martin Quintet, who become the Roberta Martin Singers, an unusual development in a time when gospel was almost entirely segregated by gender.
- To counteract a German "cultural offensive" in Latin America, the United States government institutes a cultural program, the Division of Cultural Relations, which will soon be folded into the Office of War Information.
- The Oklahoma Indian Welfare Act is introduced, promoting the indigenous culture, including music and dance, of the Native Americans of Oklahoma.
- The Harlem Hamfats form, going on to pioneer the precursor to the modern blues band.
- The National School Vocal Association is founded.
- Composer Colin McPhee, living in Bali, composes Tabuh-Tabuhan, an early work to feature a strong Balinese influence.
- The Pat Roche Harp and Shamrock Orchestra performs at the Century of Progress World's Fair. The Orchestra is the first American band modeled after the Irish ceili.
- The Monroe Brothers begin recording, setting the stage for the development of bluegrass, and establishing their style: "sad songs sung with tight vocal harmonies that were often played at lightning speeds with spell-binding instrumental virtuosity".
- The Blue Sky Boys begin recording the first of what will be known as close harmony singing.
- Santiago Jimenez releases his first recording, "Dices Pescao"/"Dispensa el Arrempujon", on Decca Records, establishing his career; he will be the first to use the tololoche, or contrabass, in conjunto ensembles.
- On Your Toes by Richard Rodgers, Lorenz Hart, George Abbott and George Balanchine's On Your Toes is an innovative musical that integrates ballet and the musical comedy.
- Benny Goodman's band is joined by Teddy Wilson and Lionel Hampton, making Goodman the first white jazz bandleader to use African-American performers regularly, the first in the industry to do so.
- Maude Cuney Harris' Negro Musicians and their Musicis the first major publication on African-American music "produced by a musician who was also an experienced writer".
- Thomas A. Dorsey promotes a song battle between Roberta Martin and Sallie Martin, which is "apparently... the first time anyone had asked for an admission fee for a sacred-music concert".
- The McNulty Family begin recording with Decca, soon becoming one of the major fixtures of the Irish American music scene.
- European publications by Charles Delauney and Hilton Schleman are the first two attempts at documenting recorded jazz.

== 1937 ==
Late 1930s music trends
- The radio industry matures, beginning to more successfully focus on increasing market share rather than "abstract cultural good", diminishing the "demand for fine-art music and correspondingly (increasing) the demand for popular music".
- Big band swing music makes jazz a part of mainstream American pop. The popularity of swing ensembles inspires many jazz enthusiasts to focus on the improvisation and innovation, rather than the danceable pop sound of swing. This is the first form of popular music to be divided into separate realms of commercial and artistic success. A number of jazz music journals also begin documenting the burgeoning genre of swing.
- Early record companies specializing in jazz appear, like Commodore HRS and Blue Note, as do the first of a steady stream of American books on jazz, including Frederic Ramsey and Charles E. Smith's Jazzman, Wilder Hobson's American Jazz Music and Henry Osgood's So This Is Jazz.
- Chicago becomes a "center for blues performance" in the city's large African-American community, while a kind of piano-based blues called boogie-woogie becomes the most popular form of the blues.
- The Golden Gate Quartet becomes one of the most popular recording artists in the country, beginning the era of greatest popularity for gospel music.
- The term gospel comes to be applied to the genre now known as gospel music.
- Greenwich Village becomes a center for a burgeoning American folk music revival, and is home to renowned performers like Aunt Molly Jackson, Sarah Ogan and Jim Garland.
- The Hollywood musical settles on a format based around a "romantic comedy" with "four or five songs and a dance or two".
- The town of Lindsborg, Kansas begins holding public celebrations of Swedish culture; the town will become a center for Swedish American music later in the century.
- The piano accordion reaches its height of popularity, with many schools teaching the instrument and its repertoire, which depends in large part on Italian-derived music.
- The bands of Lu Watters, Eddie Condon and Bob Crosby become popular in New York City, inspiring a revival of interest in old-time New Orleans-style jazz that will peak at the end of the following decade.
- Sholom Secunda, a Yiddish theatre composer writes "Bay mir bist du sheyn", which becomes an unprecedented mainstream success.
- Sonny Terry, accompanying Blind Boy Fuller, popularizes the use of the harmonica in the blues.
- The importance of the tres in the Cuban son peaks, while Arsenio Rodríguez enjoys the height of his popularity; Rodriguez' main innovation is to incorporate the mambo, which is introduced in Cuba in this same era.
- The Wings Over Jordan Choir begins performing on radio, becoming one of the first major large choirs in gospel music.

- ASCAP raises its rates for using musical compositions in various contexts, including radio. The National Association of Broadcasters will strongly object, and will retaliate in 1939.
- Duke Ellington becomes the first jazz musician to use elements of Cuban music in his work.
- The Duquesne University Tamburitzans is formed, soon becoming one of the premier tamburitza ensembles in the country.
- The Golden Gate Quartet's "Jonah" becomes a massive hit, part of a "legendary two-hour recording session in Charlotte, North Carolina. They soon become one of the few African-American performers to appear on Magic Key Hour, an NBC show.
- With Harlem on the Prairie, Herb Jeffries becomes the first African-American singing cowboy in a movie. It is the first black musical western. No prints are known to exist.
- Harold Rome's pro-union revue, Pins and Needles becomes an unprecedented and "phenomenal success".
- Harry Owens' "Sweet Leilani" wins the Academy Award for Best Song and becomes an iconic Hawaiian song, as well as a standard part of the repertoire of Hawaiian musicians.
- J. Mayo "Ink" Williams, a talent scout, makes Mahalia Jackson the first gospel artist to sign to Decca Records.
- Kenneth Morris introduces the Hammond organ to gospel music.
- The Library of Congress' Archive of American Folk Song began receiving a budget from Congress, after functioning since 1928 through donations and other sources of income.
- Nat "King" Cole forms a piano, guitar and bass trio, which is credited as the beginning of a rhythm and blues style meant to accompany conversation instead of dancing, known as club blues or cocktail music in black and white clubs, respectively.
- Tom Wince opens the Blue Room in Vicksburg, Mississippi, which will soon become of the premier jazz and blues music venues in the Mississippi Delta.
- Woody Guthrie's performing career begins as a radio personality for KFVD in Los Angeles, as the host of Here Comes Woody and Lefty Lou.

== 1938 ==
- Aaron Copland's El Salón México is premiered in London, published by Boosey & Hawkes, and then premiered in Boston. The work is a surprise success across the country. Copland becomes the "first North American composer since Gottschalk to form a far-reaching connection with Latin America".
- The Alphabetical Four become "among the first to use a guitar" in gospel music, in their rendition of Thomas A. Dorsey's "Precious Lord".
- Charlie Low opens the Forbidden City, the first Chinese American nightclub in San Francisco, with Larry Ching as its main attraction. It will be a major local venue and an attraction for visiting performers like Duke Ellington and Bing Crosby.
- Eleanor Kane, Jim Donnelly and Packie Walsh record for Decca, the last Irish American Chicago recording until the 1970s.
- Ella Fitzgerald has her first big hit with "A-Tisket, A-Tasket".
- Erich Wolfgang Korngold's score for The Adventures of Robin Hood is an influential composition by a European working in Hollywood.
- Ira Tucker joins the Dixie Hummingbirds. He will become "one of the most influential lead singers in the history of gospel music", and will change the music's image with his energetic stage presence that has been called one of the roots of the showmanship of rhythm and blues and rock and roll.
- Sister Rosetta Tharpe's "Rock Me" was a landmark popular recording of gospel music. Tharpe becomes the first to perform gospel music outside of an explicitly religious setting (i.e. a church), when she performs at the Cotton Club in Harlem.
- John H. Hammond, a talent scout and the "first important jazz critic and record collector to become an impresario and record producer in his own right", stages the first of his From Spirituals to Swing series of concerts, a watershed event in American music history. Held at Carnegie Hall, these shows would "introduce the jump blues of Big Joe Turner" to New Yorkers. The concert would also introduce Rosetta Tharpe and provide New York with its first major concert produced for an integrated audience. This same year, Carnegie Hall features its first jazz band, led by Benny Goodman, in a concert that helps establish the legitimacy of swing music in the eyes of music aficionados and scholars.
- Louis Jordan leaves Chick Webb's orchestra to form a small band, the Tympany Five, that will contribute towards transforming the popular big band swing style to a smaller, combo style known as jump blues, an important milestone in the evolution of rhythm and blues.
- Music critic and classical performer Winthrop Sargeant publishes Jazz, Hot and Hybrid, a book that demonstrates increasing academic acceptance of jazz, demonstrating "through musical analysis that jazz repaid close listening, especially its rhythm".
- Roy Harris' Symphony No. 3 is an influential work that uses a number of techniques that become common in subsequent American classical music, including "massive but spacious textures; a new emphasis on vital, syncopated rhythms... and a rich harmonic palette".
- The Works Progress Administration organizes the California Folk Music Project, which will record and document the music of California.
- Zora Neale Hurston finishes research for her book, The Sanctified Church, on behalf of the Works Progress Administration.

== 1939 ==
- Roy Harris composes his Third Symphony in One Movement, a self-consciously American piece that drew upon his perception of American music as focused on rhythm, especially the "asymmetrical balancing of rhythmic phrases".
- Trombonist Glenn Miller leads a band to a "pinnacle of popular success beyond that of any other group of the time".
- Muggsy Spanier & His Ragtime Band are perhaps the first band of the late 1930s traditional jazz revival.
- The most successful movie musical of the era, The Wizard of Oz, is released.
- The partnership between Fred Astaire and Ginger Rogers has led to their mainstream fame, while establishing the basic format for the Hollywood dance musical.
- The first Evenings on the Roof concert is held in Los Angeles; this series of concerts, eventually known as the Monday Evening Concerts, filled an unotherwise empty niche in Los Angeles, "programming modern works in a city whose musical institutions generally ignored such works".
- ASCAP announces new demands for the licensing of popular music for radio airplay, doubling fees; in response, the broadcasting networks form Broadcast Music Incorporated (BMI), which begins licensing music ignored by ASCAP. ASCAP focused on mainstream pop and the music of Broadway and Hollywood, while BMI worked in black and white gospel music, rhythm and blues, blues and eventually, rock and roll.
- Bill Monroe begins his career developing a style of music that will become known as bluegrass, by performing on the Grand Ole Opry.
- Glenn Miller, a swing bandleader, begins a run of seventy top ten hits over the next four years, making his one of the best-selling bands of the era.
- Critically acclaimed African-American opera singer Marian Anderson performs at the Lincoln Memorial in Washington, D.C., in protest after having been blocked from performing at Constitution Hall by the Daughters of the American Revolution because of her race. Her performance has originally been requested by Eleanor Roosevelt, and Anderson will perform at Constitution Hall for Franklin Delano Roosevelt's inauguration in 1941.
- Popular actor Paul Robeson releases his composition "Ballad for Americans", which sold 30,000 copies and is considered (at the time) to be a curious "hybrid between art and popular folk".
- The Dixie Hummingbirds' "Soon Will Be Done With This World" is an innovative recording, featuring the sustained use of falsetto, one of the hallmarks that separates true gospel music from jubilee.
- The Library of Congress creates the Recorded Sound Division to catalogue the commercial recordings and other materials created by the Works Progress Administration.
- The Grand Ole Opry is expanded into a national show, broadcast on NBC, becoming the most influential in the history of country music.
- John Cage's Imaginary Landscape No. 1, a composition for piano, Chinese cymbal and two phonograph turntables, is among the earliest live electronic works.
- One of the most famous of the Depression-era productions of the Theater Project of the Works Progress Administration is a jazzed version of Gilbert and Sullivan's The Mikado, called The Swing Mikado.
- Adelina García begins recording and performing on the radio, soon becoming the most popular American singer of the Mexican bolero song.
- Lawrence Welk records his first polka; his earlier recordings had little German influence, but by the early 1950s, he will become known for polkas and other German-influenced pop music.
- The score for the film Gone With the Wind, by Max Steiner, is one of the "longest and most famous film scores".
- Duke Ellington innovates the "use of the extended form" in jazz with Concerto for Cootie. Jimmy Blanton joins Ellington's band this year, going on to innovate the use of his instrument, the "string bass from an instrument that played chiefly notes on the four beats of a measure to a solo instrument that played fluent melodies, with fast running notes, sharply defined phrases, and ingenious melodic turns".
- The first historical study of jazz, Jazzmen, is published by Harcourt, Brace and Company.

== 1940 ==
Early 1940s music trends
- A period of jazz innovation begins to evolve in Harlem, led by a group of performers who clustered around Minton's Playhouse, where they "experimented with new techniques and approaches, trading ideas with others of an innovative bent", "rooted in Swing Era practice but pushing beyond its norms of tonality and velocity". This is an important part of the origin of bebop.
- Square dances regain popularity among mainstream Americans.
- Large record companies begin abandoning the "ethnic music" market, leading to the formation of many small labels targeting a specific ethnicity, such as Slavic Americans.
- Frank Sinatra becomes the first popular musician with a recognizable fanbase devoted to him specifically – the bobby soxers.

- Leopold Stokowski appears onscreen with Mickey Mouse in the movie Fantasia, becoming the "first conductor to achieve the status of entertainment star".
- Jazz audiences become increasingly interested in the history of jazz, as well as a "new field called discography (which dealt with jazz's) recorded 'documents', and a few European and American writers were reviewing jazz records critically in print".
- Billboard magazine begins publishing music charts, documenting the best-selling recordings of various categories. The first song at number one is Tommy Dorsey and Frank Sinatra's "I'll Never Smile Again".
- Woody Guthrie first performs in New York City, his subsequent fame will help to inspire the American folk revival of the 1950s, 60s and 70s. Guthrie records Dust Bowl Ballads this year; though the album is a commercial failure, it radically alters "how guitar pickers, record buyers and college professors approached folk music". The album, recorded for Victor Records, is based on Guthrie's own experiences in the Dust Bowl.
- An early all-female gospel group, the Sallie Martin Singers, has one of its first major hits with "Just a Closer Walk With Thee".
- Supreme Court Justice Learned Hand rules that playing a record on the radio does not infringe copyright.
- A well-received performance at the Morning Star Baptist Church makes Mahalia Jackson the single biggest star in gospel music.
- Machito, a Cuban-American bandleader, forms an orchestra (Machito & His AfroCubans) that will mix jazz with elements of Cuban folk music; the orchestra's arrangements, by Mario Bauzá are a particularly important key to its success.
- Lydia Mendoza, the most popular Tejano music star of the era, retires. She will return to music in 1947.
- Duke Ellington and trumpeter Cootie Williams publish Concerto for Cootie, the "first real concerto in the jazz idiom".
- Sonny Boy Williamson I begins recording, with a drummer, creating a distinctive style that will become known as jump blues. Williamson will also define the solo blues harmonica.
- Gustave Reese's Music in the Middle Ages is the first well-received, major scholarly work on early music published in the United States.
- New York City police begin fingerprinting all employees of every club where music is performed; identification cards are given to musicians and are required for them to legally perform in any club. Many musicians are refused cards due to alleged dubious character, most often past narcotics charges.
- James Caesar Petrillo is elected leader of the American Federation of Musicians, and will lead the union on its strike later in the decade. He will become one of the most famous union leaders of the era.
- W. C. Handy becomes the subject of a radio show on NBC, the first such program completely devoted to the work of an African-American composer.
- The first jukeboxes with photos are introduced by Mills to show soundies, short films mixed with music performances and vaudeville or gymnastics acts.

== 1941 ==
- Within a few days of the bombing of Pearl Harbor, two anti-Japanese songs are published by Tin Pan Alley: "You're a Sap, Mister Jap" and "The Sun Will Soon Be Setting for the Land of the Rising Sun".
- The Army, having had no music school since 1928, creates one in a hurry, settling on Fort Myer, Virginia as its homebase.
- Henry Cowell marries ethnomusicologist Sidney Robertson, who introduces him to the shape note tunes of Southern Harmony, which inspires many of his later works.
- Teddy Hill, proprietor of Minton's Playhouse in New York City, hires a band featuring both Thelonious Monk and Kenny Clarke. Soon joined by other renowned jazz musicians, the group experimented with new musical ideas, such as the flatted fifth, eventually resulting in the new genre of bebop jazz.
- Alan Lomax brings out an album featuring field recordings of black convicts singing a work song and a field holler, the first commercially released field recording.
- Anita O'Day joins the band of Gene Krupa. She will be the first of a wave of "hip white jazz musicians".
- Pete Seeger joins with Woody Guthrie, Millard Lampell and Lee Elhardt Hays to form the Almanac Singers, who have been called the "first urban folk-singing group". They aimed to bring the "informal, directly communicative appeal of folk-type music into the urban middle-class milieu".
- A number of performers, many of them from big bands, began playing at Minton's Playhouse in Harlem; these included house pianist Thelonious Monk.
- Alfred Newman's score for Blood and Sand is an important composition in the history of film soundtracks.
- Bernard Hermann's score for Citizen Kane refines the "practices of the (1930s) through more careful, more limited, and more unusual instrumentations".
- Popular gospel group the Golden Gate Quartet moves to OKeh Records and releases two of their biggest hits, "Coming in on a Wing and a Prayer" and "Stalin Wasn't Stallin'".
- ASCAP goes on strike to protest the National Association of Broadcasters creation of a competing organization, BMI.
- John Cage and Lou Harrison's Double Music is an early example of Asian influence in American music, the piece being strongly influenced by the gamelan tradition.
- Arnold Schoenberg, a controversial Viennese composer and creator of the twelve-tone system, becomes an American citizen.
- Radio Belgrade begins playing a recording of "Lili Marleen" by Lale Andersen. It is a hit among German troops, and spreads to British and American soldiers, in a version by Marlene Dietrich soon after. It is one of the most popular songs of the war.
- Mary Cardwell Dawson founds the National Negro Opera Company, the first permanent African-American opera company, in Pittsburgh, Pennsylvania.
- King Biscuit Time, one of the longest-living and most celebrated and influential blues radio programs, is first broadcast out of KFFA in Helena, Arkansas. It is one of many shows sponsored by white business with a largely black clientele to arise in the era, and will introduce Sonny Payne and Sonny Boy Williamson II.
- The Bolling Army Air Corps Band is formed. This is the forerunner of the Air Force Band.
- Roy Eldridge joined Gene Krupa, making him among the first African Americans to be a permanent member of the brass section of a white jazz big band.
- A group of soldiers begins broadcasting music from their base on Kodiak Island, Alaska. This is the foundation of the Armed Forces Radio Service.

== 1942 ==
- Billboard publishes the "Harlem Hit Parade", the first black music chart.
- With the addition of new publishing companies to BMI, rural country and African-American musics become more prominently associated with BMI, rather than ASCAP.
- The American Federation of Musicians begins the 1942–44 musicians' strike in protest of the radio broadcasting of recorded music.
- Singer and saxophonist Louis Jordan begins a series of hit releases that popularize a style known as jump, a "propulsive, boogie-woogie-based style of swing".
- Acuff-Rose, a publishing form headquartered in Nashville, is founded; it will become the first nationally successful country music publishing company and the first in Nashville.
- The Koussevitzky Music Foundation is established to "support the production (of American classical music) through its commissioning program".
- The American Federation of Musicians institutes a "300-mile jump limit", in response to gas rationing, forbidding performers from traveling more than 300 miles between performance sites.
- Lionel Hampton's "Flying Home" popularizes a style of "honking" tenor saxophone, as played by Illinois Jacquet.
- African-American bandsmen in the Navy begin to be trained at Camp Robert Smalls, Camp Lawrence and Camp Moffatt, the graduates of which will become known as some of the "finest musicians in the armed services". Bandsmen include Gerald Wilson, Donald White, Clark Terry, Major Holley, Luther Henderson and Ulysses Kay.
- Billy Eckstine performs "Skylark" on network radio, becoming the first African-American vocalist to do so.
- Haprischordist Putnam Aldrich's Harvard dissertation on French Baroque ornamentation is "one of the earliest American studies on performance practice". Aldrich will also, as a member of the Stanford University faculty, develop the first graduate program in early music in the country.
- The Golden Gate Quartet appear in Star Spangled Rhythm with Betty Hutton, one of the first gospel groups to appear in a commercial film.
- The first Pulitzer Prize for music is awarded to a cantata, A Free Song, by William Schuman.
- Glenn Miller joins the Army to modernize the military's bands, soon transferring to the Air Force instead.
- Women are first organized into the Women's Army Auxiliary Corps, which includes five bands.
- Voice of America begins broadcasting.
- RCA-Victor releases a recording of the score to the film The Jungle Book, a set of three records with music by Miklós Rósza and narration from the film's star, Sabu. This is the first album of a film score.

== 1943 ==
- The American Forces Network begins broadcasting. The Network will introduce country, jazz and other styles of American music to many parts of Europe
- Billie Holiday begins her career with Earl Hines' orchestra.
- The Bolling Army Air Corps Band is reorganized, becoming the official band of the Army Air Corps.
- Regimental bands in the U.S. Army are consolidated into division bands.
- The U.S. Army Band embarks on a European tour which will last two years. They will be the "only special band in Washington, D.C." to perform in a foreign theater of combat operations.
- The Clara Ward Singers become a popular success at the National Baptist Convention in Chicago.
- Dizzy Gillespie leads a jazz quintet at the Manhattan nightspot Onyx Club, introducing bebop to New York City.
- Richard Rodgers and Oscar Hammerstein II's Oklahoma! premiers; its reception "surpassed by far anything previously achieved by a Broadway musical play". The musical's success inspires composers to generally agree that "shows emphasizing songs, dances, and high-spirited romance lacked the impact of integrated shows whose musical numbers were rooted in the drama".
- Victor Young's score for For Whom the Bell Tolls is an influential work in the development of film soundtracks.
- Duke Ellington begins a series of annual concerts at Carnegie Hall, which make him the "first jazzman to write concert jazz in extended forms".
- Dizzy Gillespie forms a quintet at the Onyx Club in New York City, along with George Washington, Oscar Pettiford, Mac Roach and Don Byas. Gillespie has called this the "birth of the bebop era".
- Two band training facilities are open for the U.S. Army, one at Camp Crowder and one at Camp Lee in Virginia. The former will close the following year.
- Esquire begins a poll of jazz critics, a practice that becomes widespread among music periodicals. The results are controversial due to the success of several African Americans in some categories.
- The Music Section of the Special Services Division of the American army and navy begin distributing recordings, V-discs, to military personnel abroad.
- A. Schwab's Dry Goods Store sponsors Bluestown, a radio program, possibly becoming the first business to sponsor a blues radio program.
- John Lee Hooker arrives in Detroit and begins playing at Brown's Bar. He will soon become the city's most famous bluesman.
- Sydney Nathan founds King Records, "arguably the most important independent label in the years before" rock and roll.
- Stormy Weather is released, soon becoming one of very few all-black musical films. It starred Lena Horne, Bill "Bojangles" Robinson, Cab Calloway and Fats Waller.

== 1944 ==
- The American Federation of Musicians recording ban ends, and the union becomes an integral part of the American music industry. One of the concessions is the end of tracking, in which bits of old film music were re-used; the union succeeded in banning this practice.
- Having produced enough bandleaders, the Army Music School is shut down.
- With audiences having been unable to acquire new jazz records under the recording ban, many fans were unaware of the shift from the popular swing era to what would eventually be known as bebop. The reaction was hostile to the new style. The first bebop recordings are made this year, after the ban ends, by a band founded by Billy Eckstine.
- Billboard launches specialist music charts, in addition to the long-standing general chart, to identify the most-played "hillbilly" and "race" songs on jukeboxes. Louis Jordan's "G.I. Jive" becomes the first song to simultaneously top all three Billboard charts: "pop", "race" and "folk". The first country music chart ever is "Most Played Juke Box Folk Records".
- The Dance Collection of the New York Public Library for the Performing Arts is formed; it will be the "largest and most comprehensive archive in the world devoted to the documentation of dance".
- Richard Dyer-Bennet is the first American folksinger to sell out the Town Hall in New York City. He specializes in "arty folk songs".
- The Army organizes the First Combat Infantry Band, the first military band constituted entirely of musicians who had served in combat. This is the forerunner of the United States Ground Forces Band.
- Jimmie Davis, a country musician, successfully runs for Governor of Louisiana with his own composition, "You Are My Sunshine", as his theme song.

== 1945 ==
Mid-1940s music trends
- The Roberta Martin Singers adds two female performers, making it the "first combination of male and female voices in one ensemble". The Singers were performing and recording in New York, working with independent labels that focused on jazz and rhythm and blues.
- The end of the creative peak of jazz in Manhattan.
- Square dances have become an integral part of American culture, and is part of the physical education curriculum in many schools.
- A thirty-one-treble-button accordion with triple rows becomes the dominant form of the instrument used in the Tejano corrido; specifically the Hohner Corona II and Gabbanelli are popular kinds of accordion.
- Walter Solek introduces English language polkas to the Polish American repertoire.

- The approximate end of the period of greatest mainstream popularity for swing music.
- Earl Scruggs joins Bill Monroe & the Bluegrass Boys; his innovative banjo-playing will provide an important basis for the burgeoning field of bluegrass music.
- Tobacco strikers in Charleston, South Carolina rework the lyrics and tone of the song eventually known as "We Shall Overcome", giving it a spiritual style. This version will become the basis for the song as it will be used as an anthem during the Civil Rights Movement.
- The Dew Drop Inn in New Orleans opens. It will quickly become the most prominent venue in the city, especially known for a roster of influential rhythm and blues acts.
- Miklós Rózsa's score for Spellbound is an acclaimed composition by a European composer working in Hollywood.
- Bunk Johnson, a Louisianan trumpeter, is brought to New York City with a band from New Orleans to perform, as a revival of interest in old-time New Orleans-style jazz begins to peak.
- Eugene Smith becomes the first of many to launch a successful solo career after leaving the Roberta Martin Singers, with his early gospel blues hit "I Know the Lord Will Make a Way, Oh Yes, He Will".
- A recording of Oklahoma! becomes the first musical show recording to become a modern hit.
- Johnny Moore's Three Blazers' "Blues at Sunrise" is the first major hit single for the group, who will popularize a bluesy trio style.
- Many American soldiers, having been exposed to Polynesian music during World War 2, leads to nostalgic interest in Hawaiian music and a strengthened Polynesian American performance tradition.
- Todd Duncan becomes the first African-American male "to sing with a major opera company", New York City Opera, as Tonio in Leoncavallo's Pagliacci.
- Nora Holt, sponsored by Virgil Thomson, becomes the "first black journalist to be elected to the New York Music Critic's Circle".
- Lawrence Berk founds the Berklee College of Music, the only institute devoted to the training of jazz musicians in the world.
- Woody Herman's big band becomes the first bop-oriented white ensemble.
- The Magnetophon tape recording technology, created in Germany, is brought to the United States following World War 2. The United States will become the home of tape technology.
- Approximate: Charles and William Brown form Brown Radio Productions, one of the first commercial recording and radio broadcasting companies in Nashville, soon to be the home for the American country music industry.
- Billboard journalist and columnist Maurie Orodenker describes Erskine Hawkins' version of "Caldonia" as "right rhythmic rock and roll music", a phrase precisely repeated in his 1946 review of "Sugar Lump" by Joe Liggins.

== 1946 ==
- Conguero Chano Pozo joins Dizzy Gillespie's band, leading to a fusion of bebop with Afro-Cuban music, a style known as Cubop, as well as greatly increased acceptance for Latin jazz in general.
- The composer Elliott Carter publishes a piano sonata, a "daring advance in his development as a composer", establishing his reputation for working towards "more and more complex atonal musical (styles) while steering clear of musical systems".
- Henry Glover, talent scout for King, becomes one of the "first black men in the postwar record business to be given any creative clout". He originally worked in the white folk or hillbilly field, then branched into "race music" with Bull Moose Jackson, a popular singer of "naughty novelties and lugubrious ballads".
- Louis Jordan's "Let the Good Times Roll" becomes a symbol of "economic prosperity and a new era in (the United States') social history" for all Americans, while for many blacks, the song signified an "end to racial inequalities" due to the cross-cultural mixing that became common during the recently ended World War 2.
- The Nat King Cole Trio Time becomes the first all-black sponsored radio show.
- Roy Milton's "R. M. Blues" and Louis Jordan's "Choo-Choo-Ch'boogie" are two of the first black recordings to sell over a million copies.
- Castle Recording Laboratory, founded by WSM engineers George Reynolds, Carl Jenkins and Aaron Shelton, is established as the first commercial recording studio in Nashville.
- Rudi Blesh's Shining Trumpets is the first single-authored historical overview of jazz.
- The Soul Stirrers record "Lord, I've Tried", a landmark in the transition from jubilee singing to true gospel music.
- The Sphinx Club in Baltimore becomes one of the first minority-owned clubs in the United States.
- New York Mayor William O'Dwyer proclaims "Bill Robinson Day" in honor of legendary tap dancer Bill Robinson.
- The golden age of the jazz big band comes to an end.
- Camilla Williams becomes the first African-American female to sing with the New York City Opera, in Puccini's Madama Butterfly.
- Armen Carapetyan's Institute of Renaissance and Baroque Music becomes the American Institute of Musicology, whose publications will develop "into one of the most important musicological publishing ventures of the 20th century".
- Willi Apel and Archibald T. Davison begin publishing the Historical Anthology of Music, which has remained one of the standard pedagogical works on early music since its publication.
- Arthur Godfrey Time, a television show that presents amateur entertainers, begins broadcasting. It is the most popular and influential amateur performance show of the era.
- Metro-Goldwyn Mayer begins a recording subsidiary, the first major involvement of Hollywood with the recording industry.

Late 1940s music trends
- Record companies begin more fiercely competing for radio airtime.
- The first radio stations aimed exclusively at black listeners begin in the South, especially Atlanta, Louisville, Memphis, Los Angeles, St. Louis, New Orleans, Nashville and Miami.
- Paul Bigsby creates an electric guitar for Merle Travis, a country singer. Though the exact date is not known, it may be among the earliest solid body electric guitars.
- Eddie Jefferson becomes the first prominent performer of vocalese, songs in which new vocal tracks are set to instrumental jazz recordings.
- The "idea that music could have an essence separate from the way it sounded in performance", an idea long seen as exclusive to Western classical music, comes to be applied to jazz through performers like Charlie Parker, focusing on "creation and performance, in the manner of classical musicians letting reception take care of itself"
- Many country performers begin experimenting with a pedal steel, a steel guitar on a stand set up so that the guitarist can change pitches and chords.
- The Old Regular Baptists of Jesus Christ, a small sect in eastern Kentucky, move in large numbers to Indiana, Michigan and Ohio. They preserve traditional Christian music techniques derived from 18th century New England, such as the heterophonic performance of monophonic tunes and the lining out of hymns.
- George Herzog sets up the Archives of Traditional Music at Indiana University, which will be the largest ethnographic archive in an American university.
- Inspired by pioneer Bill Monroe and his band, a generation of younger prformers, many of them working-class and frequently migrants from rural areas to cities, form a number of important proto-bluegrass bands.
- The technology behind electric loudspeakers and amplifiers begins progressing rapidly.
- Gospel jubilee singing groups end their last period of great popularity within the field of African-American Christian music.
- The genre now known as rock and roll begins to reach its breakthrough form.
- The guitar becomes the most prominent instrument in the blues.
- The nascent bebop jazz scene comes to include a number of defining cultural characteristics, including the "unfortunate fashionability of heroin", which was inspired, in large part, by the success of addict Charlie Parker, the use of African-American vernacular-derived slang, and criticism of the racial politics of the era.
- The independent record labels that dominate the African-American music industry begin targeting the growing teenage demographic by signing performers from that age group. Jesse Stone and Dave Bartholomew are among the legendary talent scouts from this era.
- Tony de la Rosa adds the drum set to the Tejano conjunto style, forever changing the genre's sound; he will later add amplification and the bass to the field.
- German American bands begin performing in a manner influenced by swing and jazz.
- Slovenian American dance bands, until now dominated entirely by the accordion, come to include banjo, string bass and drum set.
- The accordion polka craze in the United States peaks.
- The Holocaust has several effects on Jewish music in the United States, namely leading to a decline in Yiddish language music and a rise in cantors being trained at home rather than in Europe.
- Turkish Armenian 'ud player Oudi Harrant moves to the United States, becoming one of the most popular Middle Eastern musicians in the country.
- The Yale Collegium, though not the first of its kind, is the most influential in beginning the American collegium movement, and is an important early institution in American early music.
- A series of country boogie hits – country songs with an uptempo beat – become popular, including recordings like Tennessee Ernie Ford's "Shot Gun Boogie" and "Blackberry Boogie".
- The term hi-fi, referring to high fidelity, comes into use, associated with the spread of LPs.
- Latin jazz musicians like Chano Pozo and Juan Tizol develop a style known as Cubop.

== 1947 ==
- The Audio Engineering Society is formed to organize the recording and audio-science professions and hold technology conventions.
- The Grand Ole Opry sends a band led by Ernest Tubb to New York to be the first country band to be featured at Carnegie Hall.
- The sung station identification jingle is used.
- Wynonie Harris' "Good Rockin' Tonight" becomes a major hit and popularizes the word rock, heralding "a new era in American popular culture".
- Jean Ritchie, a major figure of the American roots revival, begins performing in a rural style in New York.
- When the major radio networks, CBS, NBC and Mutual, begin focusing more on television than radio, they cease pressuring the FCC to limit the number of radio stations in each market. The result is more fragmentation in the radio industry, and stations that target niche markets, such as African Americans.
- The Ravens become one of the first African-American groups to reach the pop charts.
- Jazz musician and composer Thelonious Monk makes a number of famous recordings, making him a favorite among many other jazz artists at the time, but he will not receive mainstream accolades until the late 1950s.
- Tito Puente and Tito Rodríguez form the own bands, an important milestone in the early evolution of mambo, a Cuban-derived dance music.
- One of the most successful performers of Afro-Cuban music is Miguelito Valdez, who forms his own band this year.
- Three hundred Indonesian seamen desert their ship in New York, seeking residence in the United States; though it requires a court battle, they are successful, marking the beginning of Indonesian immigration.
- The College Music Society is founded.
- The transistor is created at Bell Telephone Laboratories.
- Arthur Farwell's arrangement of a Navajo dance for chorus a cappella, created for the Westminster Choir and first directed by John Finlay Williamson is "remarkable for its unique combination of tribal authenticity and concert effectiveness".
- WERD, the first African American-owned radio station in the United States, is founded by Jesse B. Blayton.
- La Carrousel, one of the longest-lived nightclubs in the country, first opens. It soon becomes the premier jazz club in Atlanta.

== 1948 ==
- Charlie Parker's "Parker's Blues" is released on the Savoy label; it features Parker, John Lewis, Curly Russell and Max Roach, an exhaustively scrutinized recording of historical importance.
- WDIA in Memphis becomes the first radio station to feature exclusively African-American music.
- The first commercially produced solid electric guitar is the Fender Broadcaster, created by the Fender Electric Instrument Company.
- A number of popular guitar boogie records are released, including John Lee Hooker's "Boogie Chillen", Arthur Smith's "Guitar Boogie" and Les Paul's "Hip-Billy Boogie".
- Pee Wee King and Redd Stewart record "Tennessee Waltz", the biggest "pop hit of the postwar, prerock era"; the song would become a country standard, and inspires a number of cover versions in the following years.
- Les Brown's instrumental recording of "I've Got My Love to Keep Me Warm" is considered the last chart-topping hit of the swing era.
- Lester Flatt, Earl Scruggs, Jimmy Shumate and Howard Watts leave Bill Monroe & His Bluegrass Boys to form the Foggy Mountain Boys; the band will become one of the long-running institutions of American folk music and one of the pioneering groups of bluegrass music.
- Mahalia Jackson's "Move On Up a Little Higher" becomes the first million-selling recording.
- The 33-1/3-rpm LP is introduced by Columbia.
- The Orioles' "It's Too Soon to Know" is sometimes considered the first rock and roll recording. This song established The Orioles, who are widely considered the first rhythm and blues vocal group.
- Al Hurricane begins performing at the age of twelve; he will go on to become the most influential New Mexican Hispano musician of the late 20th century.
- Frankie Yankovic's "Just Because" becomes his first major hit, establishing him as a polka star and an important figure in the Slovenian American music scene.
- African-American entertainers begin regularly appearing on television shows, particularly The Ed Sullivan Show.
- Billy Eckstine signs with MGM, soon becoming the first African-American male to become a pop idol. He will be the "first black ballad singer to succeed as a soloist independently of a dance band".
- Nat King Cole's group becomes the first jazz combo to have a sponsored radio show.
- Capitol Records established the first Capitol Studios at the former home of radio station KHJ at 5515 Melrose Avenue in Hollywood, California.
- Dean Dixon, "one of the first African Americans to prepare himself as a symphony conductor", debuts with the New York Philharmonic.
- Sophie Drinker's Music and Women is the "first extensive exploration in feminist musical scholarship".
- The Women's Army Corps is merged into the regular army, and the Corps' band becomes the 14th Army Band, the only such band open to women in the country.
- The earliest American experiments in musique concrète are conducted by Louis and Bebe Barron, though they do not produce any complete compositions.

== 1949 ==
- Alan Lomax's work on Jelly Roll Morton constitutes the first biography of a musician to be executed as a serious historical appraisal.
- Alfred Einstein's The Italian Madrigal is the first comprehensive work on the madrigal.
- Billboard magazine begins using the term rhythm and blues to describe African-American popular music, formerly race music, and country and western to describe what was formerly folk music. This is the first usage of the term rhythm and blues in the popular music industry.
- Dewey Phillips begins broadcasting the Red Hot 'n' Blue radio show in Memphis, bringing the "savage sound of the Delta blues to Memphians of all races".
- The Clara Ward Singers release "Surely God Is Able", a popular song that was one of the first in gospel to be in three-quarter, or waltz-time.
- Dave Carey and Albert McCarthy begin publishing the Jazz Directory, the first published discography to organize entries by matrix-number. The work was intended to be comprehensive, but will never be published beyond the letter "L", because the rise of the LP led to a proliferation of a recorded music, making a comprehensive directory impractical.
- The federal government begins to offer incentives to Native Americans to move to urban areas; the policy promotes the intertribal mixing, stimulating the growth of the powwow.
- Hank Williams joins the Grand Ole Opry, helping to define country music for a legion of new listeners.
- William Grant Still's Troubled Island is the first "full-length opera by a black composer mounted by a major American company", premiering with the New York City Opera this year.
- Marian Anderson's performance of "The Negro Speaks of Rivers" at Carnegie Hall gives national attention to its composer, Howard Swanson (text by Langston Hughes), who "consciously integrated African-American musical idioms into the neoclassical forms he created".
- Miles Davis' Birth of the Cool launches his solo career, creating a new style with a number of like-minded musicians, characterized by an emphasis on "coloristic timbral effects achieved through unusual pairings of instruments..., no vibrato, and a seamless integration of written and improvised music". This is the beginning of cool jazz and chamber jazz.
- Fats Domino's "The Fat Man" is the first in a series of hits made under the guidance of Dave Bartholomew, who innovated the New Orleans rhythm and blues style.
- Lionel "Chica" Sesma is hired by KOWL in Los Angeles to host a bilingual program that will soon switch to focus exclusively on Latin music; Sesma will become "synonymous with Latin dance music throughout" the 1950s and 60s.
- Sam Phillips opens a studio in Memphis, where he will record many of the most influential performers of the 1950s, including Elvis Presley, Ike Turner and Howlin' Wolf.
- The band of Tito Rodríguez achieves great success, with Rodriguez becoming one of the first major Puerto Rican stars in the New York Latin music scene and his band becoming a leader of the Palladium Dance Hall era and an important group in the international popularization of Caribbean-derived dance music.
- Tito Puente's band, the Mambo Boys, has their first hit with "Abanico", establishing Puente's career; he is known for having brought his groups percussion section to the forefront, which will become the standard for Cuban dance bands in the United States until the 1990s.
- One of the most enduring and popular Estonian American music groups, the New York Estonian Male Chorus is formed.
- The family of Walter Raudkivi-Stein settles in Baltimore, soon establishing themselves as the giants of the American kannel-manufacturing industry.
- The establishment of the People's Republic of China leads to a schism between Chinese Americans and Chinese in China, with many Chinese intellectuals stranded in the United States. The Chinese American music community becomes polarized as a result, with separate communities of upper-class intellectuals, working classes and various linguistic or ethnic groups, each developing distinct musical traditions.
- Leo Ornstein's Living Music of the Americas is the "first publication to cover the entire spectrum of musical composition in the Western Hermisphere".
- William Herbert Brewster, Sr.'s "Surely God Is Able" is a successful early example of Brewster's main innovation in his gospel career: popularizing the use of triplets.
- The cast recording of Oklahoma! becomes the first LP to sell a million copies.
