= Harry Parks =

Harry or Henry Parks may refer to:

- Harry Jeremiah Parks (1848–1927), American Civil War Medal of Honor recipient
- Henry Blanton Parks 1856–1936), African American clergyman a/k/a H. B. Parks
- Harry Parks (cricketer) (1906–1984), English right-handed batsman with Sussex
- Henry G. Parks Jr. (1916–1989), American businessman

== See also ==
- Harry Parkes (disambiguation)
- Henry Park (1745–1831), English surgeon
