= Theodore Fry (disambiguation) =

Theodore Fry (1836–1912) was an English businessman and Liberal Party politician. Theodore Fry or Frye may also refer to:

- Theodore I. Fry (1881–1962), Michigan politician
- Theodore Frye (1899–1963), American gospel composer and singer
- Theodore Christian Frye (1869–1962), American botany professor
