= Stand by Me (Charles Albert Tindley song) =

1905 gospel song

- by Charles Albert Tindley
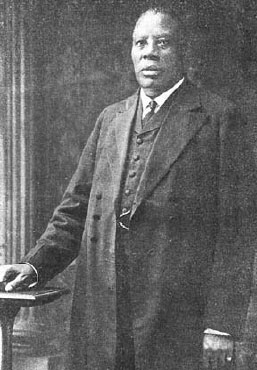
- Genre: Hymn
- Written: 1905
- Meter: 8.3.8.3.7.7.8.3

"Stand by Me" is a 1905 gospel song by Charles Albert Tindley. Despite the song's documented origins, it has sometimes been published without attribution or erroneously listed as "traditional".

The song is sometimes referred to as "Stand by Me Father", leading to confusion with an unrelated song with that name by Sam Cooke and J. W. Alexander.

"Stand by Me" has been recorded by various artists, including Bob Dylan and Elvis Presley. It served as an inspiration for the popular song of the same name by Ben E. King.

== Lyrics ==
When the storms of life are raging, stand by me.
When the storms of life are raging, stand by me.
When the world is tossing me, like a ship upon the sea,
thou who rulest wind and water, stand by me.

In the midst of tribulation, stand by me.
In the midst of tribulation, stand by me.
When the hosts of hell assail, and my strength begins to fail,
thou who never lost a battle, stand by me.

In the midst of faults and failures, stand by me.
In the midst of faults and failures, stand by me.
When I do the best I can, and my friends misunderstand,
thou who knowest all about me, stand by me.

In the midst of persecution, stand by me.
In the midst of persecution, stand by me.
When my foes in battle array, undertake to stop my way,
thou who saved Paul and Silas, stand by me.

When I'm growing old and feeble, stand by me.
When I'm growing old and feeble, stand by me.
When my life becomes a burden, and I'm nearing chilly Jordan,
O thou Lily of the Valley, stand by me.

== Recordings ==
The song has been recorded by artists including:

- 1928: Pace Jubilee Singers (10-inch 78 rpm single Victor 21551)
- 1937: Norfolk Jubilee Singers (Decca Records)
- 1941: Sister Rosetta Tharpe (Decca). However, the lyrics do not match the hymn so it is a totally different song.
- 1949: Ernest Tubb (10-inch 78 rpm single Decca 14506)
- 1961: The Staple Singers (Vee Jay)
- 1966: The Caravans (Exodus Records)
- 1966: Elvis Presley (RCA Victor)
- 1975: Johnny Shines ("Johnny Shines 'Live' in Europe 1975", Document Records)
- 1985: Canton Spirituals (J&B Records)
- 1994: Willie Nelson (MCA Records)
- 2018: Sweet Yonder (Sweet Yonder) on the album Next to You
- (Date unknown) The Pilgrim Travelers. Re-issued on The Best of Gospel Choirs (1995, Baur Music Production BMP 51143)
