= Pace Jubilee Singers =

Background information
- Genres: Gospel
- Years active: 1925–29
- Labels: Brunswick, Victor

The Pace Jubilee Singers were a gospel group founded by Charles Henry Pace in Chicago in 1925, and one of the first gospel groups to be recorded. They recorded more than 40 songs for Victor and for Brunswick Records in 1926–29, including spirituals arranged by Pace, and songs and hymns by Pace and Charles Albert Tindley and others. They performed in close harmony style, usually accompanied by piano or organ. Thomas A. Dorsey was briefly associated with them. In their later recordings, Hattie Parker is identified as soloist.

== Recordings ==
- 1926 – "My Lord What a Morning" / "I'm Going Through with Jesus" 10" 78rpm single Victor 20225
- 1926 – "My Lord's Writing All the Time" / "I Do, Don't You?" 10-inch 78 rpm single Victor 20226
- 1926 – "Gonna Reap What You Sow" / "Everybody's Gotta Walk That Lonesome Valley" 10-inch 78 rpm single Victor 20310
- 1927 – "We Will Walk thru the Valley of Peace" / "Is It Well with Your Soul Today?" 10-inch 78 rpm single Brunswick 7001
- 1927 – "His Eye Is on the Sparrows" / "Walk in the Light of God" 10-inch 78 rpm single Brunswick 7008
- 1927 – "Lawdy Won't You Come By Home" / "My Lord Will Deliver" 10-inch 78 rpm single Brunswick 7009
- 1927 – "Shouting On" / "Oh Death" 10-inch 78 rpm single Victor 20813
- 1927 – "I'll Journey On" / "All the Way" 10-inch 78 rpm single Victor 20947
- 1927 – "Ride On Jesus" / "Heav'n" unreleased
- 1928 – "Stand by Me" / "Take Your Burden to the Lord and Leave It There" 10-inch 78 rpm single Victor 21551
- 1928 – "Ezekiel Saw the Wheel" / "When the Saints Go Marching In" 10-inch 78 rpm single Victor 21582
- 1928 – "What a Friend We Have In Jesus" / "Nothing Between" 10-inch 78 rpm single Victor 21655
- 1928 – "Seek and You Shall Find" / "My Lord's Going to Move This Wicked Race" 10-inch 78 rpm single Victor 21705
- 1928 – "Old Time Religion" 10-inch 78 rpm single Victor 22097-B
- 1928 – "Every Time I Feel Spirit" / "I'm Going to Do All I Can" 10-inch 78 rpm single Victor 38018
- 1929 – "A Little Talk with Jesus" / "Like Is Like a Mountain Railroad"
- 1929 – "I'm Going Through Jesus" / "What a Friend We have in Jesus" 10-inch single Victor 23363 (re-releases)
- 1929 – "I've Done My Work" / "My Task" 10-inch 78 rpm single Victor 38501
- 1929 – "Steal Away and Pray" / "The Haven of Rest" 10-inch 78 rpm single Victor 38511
- 1929 – "It Pays to Serve Jesus" / "It's a Precious Thing" 10-inch 78 rpm single Victor 38522
- 1929 – "No Night There" / "In That City" 10-inch 78 rpm single Victor 38543
- 1929 – "It Is Well with My Soul" / "Holy Ghost with Light Divine" 10-inch 78 rpm single Victor 23412
- 1929 – "Holy Ghost with Light Divine" / "Cryin' Holy unto the Lord" 10-inch 78 rpm single Victor 38573
- 1929 – "I Can't Stay Away" / "Walk with Me" 10-inch 78 rpm single Victor 38591
- 1929 – "Roll Jordan Roll" / "Throw Out the Lifeline" 10-inch 78 rpm single Victor 38622
- 1929 – "What Are They Doing in Heaven Today?" / "Jesus Is a Rock in the Weary land" 10-inch 78 rpm single Victor 38631
- 1929 – "You Got to Run, Run, Run" / "Old Time Religion" 10-inch 78 rpm single Bluebird B-5811
