= Harry Parkes =

Harry Parkes may refer to:

- Sir Harry Parkes (diplomat) (1828–1885), British diplomat
- Harry Parkes (footballer, born 1888) (1888–1947), English footballer and manager in the 1920s and 1930s
- Harry Parkes (footballer, born 1920) (1920–2009), English footballer of the 1940s and 1950s for Aston Villa

== See also ==
- Harry Parke (1904–1958), American comedian and writer
- Harry Parks (disambiguation)
