= Leave It There =

"Take Your Burden to the Lord and Leave It There"

Single by Washington Phillips
- Recorded: Dallas, Texas, December 2, 1927
- Genre: Gospel blues
- Length: 3:10
- Label: Columbia
- Songwriter: Charles A. Tindley
- Producer: Frank B. Walker

"Leave It There"

Single by Pace Jubilee Singers
- Recorded: Chicago, June 30, 1928
- Genre: Gospel
- Length: 3:07
- Label: Victor (21551-B)
- Songwriter: Charles A. Tindley

"Take Your Burden to the Lord and Leave It There"

Single by Blind Willie Johnson
- Recorded: New Orleans, Louisiana, December 11, 1929
- Genre: Gospel blues
- Length: 2:57
- Label: Columbia
- Songwriter: Charles A. Tindley

"Leave It There" is a Christian hymn composed in 1916 by African-American Methodist minister Charles A. Tindley. It has become popular enough to have been included in 12 hymnals; and even to be attributed to "traditional" or "anonymous". The title is sometimes given as "Take Your Burden to the Lord and Leave It There" or as "Take Your Burden to the Lord" or as "Take Your Burden", words taken from the song's refrain; the plurals "burdens" and "them" are sometimes used, and "God" instead of "the Lord":

Leave it there, leave it there,
Take your burden to the Lord and leave it there.
If you trust and never doubt, He will surely bring you out.
Take your burden to the Lord and leave it there.

== Origins of the lyrics ==
The song relates to Psalm 55:22:

Cast thy burden upon the LORD, and he shall sustain thee: he shall never suffer the righteous to be moved.

and to Christ's words in the Gospel of Matthew at 11:28-30:

Come unto me, all ye that labour and are heavy laden, and I will give you rest.
Take my yoke upon you, and learn of me; for I am meek and lowly in heart: and ye shall find rest unto your souls.
For my yoke is easy, and my burden is light.

It also relates to the Gospel of Matthew at 6:26:

Behold the fowls of the air: for they sow not, neither do they reap, nor gather into barns; yet your heavenly Father feedeth them. Are ye not much better than they?

== Recording history ==
On December 2, 1927, the song was recorded in gospel blues style by Washington Phillips (vocals and zither). According to the book Country Music Records : A Discography, 1921-1942: A Discography, 1921-1942, on December 13, 1927, it was recorded by Frank and James McCravy. On June 30, 1928, it was recorded in gospel style by the Pace Jubilee Singers (chorus, singing in close harmony) with Hattie Parker (vocal soloist) and piano accompaniment. On December 11, 1929, it was recorded in gospel blues style by Blind Willie Johnson (vocals (using his "growl" (false bass) voice throughout) and guitar) and Willie B. Harris (vocals), who is thought to have been his first wife. Despite their closeness in time both to each other and to the date of composition, those three early versions are stylistically very different.

The song has since been recorded many times in a wide variety of styles; mostly gospel-based, but a few blues- or country-based. Some recordings misattribute authorship to Johnson or to Phillips instead of to Tindley; some artists have even claimed that it was their own composition.

== Recordings ==
- 1927 – Washington Phillips, "Take Your Burden to the Lord and Leave It There" 10" 78rpm single Columbia 14277-D
- 1927 – Ruth Donaldson & Helen Jepsen, "Leave It There" 10" 78rpm single Gennett 6241
- 1928 – Pace Jubilee Singers with Hattie Parker, "Leave It There" 10-inch 78 rpm single Victor 21551-B
- 1929 – Blind Willie Johnson, "Take Your Burden to the Lord and Leave It There" 10-inch 78 rpm single Columbia 14520-D
- 1929–34 – Blind Joe Taggart, "Take Your Burden to the Lord"
- 1929–36 – Blind Roosevelt Graves and Uaroy Graves, "Take Your Burden to the Lord"
- 1931 – Snowball and Sunshine, "Leave It There" included on the 2012 compilation album Work Hard, Play Hard, Pray Hard: Hard Time, Good Time & End Time Music 1923–1936
- 1938–39 – Golden Gate Quartet, "Take Your Burden(s) to God"
- 1938–39 – Shelby Gospel Four, "Take Your Burden to the Lord"
- 1951 – Dorothy Love Coates and the Original Gospel Harmonettes, "Take Your Burden to the Lord and Leave It There" first released in 1994 on the album Women of Gospel's Golden Age, Vol. 1
- 1951 – Famous Ward Singers, "Take Your Burden to the Lord" Savoy Records 4033
- 1952–53 – Tommy Duncan, "Take Your Burden to the Lord"
- 1962 – James Cleveland and the Angelic Choir, "Leave It There" Savoy Records 4188
- 1963 – Eureka Brass Band, "Take Your Burden to the Lord" on the album Jazz at Preservation Hall, Vol. 1
- 1964 – Kid Thomas Valentine, Emanuel Paul and Kid Sheik, "Take Your Burden to the Lord" on the album The Three Kings
- 1965 – Joseph Spence, "Take Your Burden to the Lord and Leave It There"
- 1966 – The Statesmen Quartet with Hovie Lister, "Leave It There" on the album The Happy Sound of the Statesmen Quartet with Hovie Lister
- 1967 – The Incredible String Band, "Take Your Burden to the Lord" first released in 2006 on the album The Circle Is Unbroken: Live and Studio 1967–1972
- 1967 – Warner Mack, "Leave It There" on the album Songs We Sang in Church and Home
- 1970 – Dock Boggs, "Leave It There" on the album Dock Boggs, Volume 3
- 1972 – Jeffrey Shurtleff, "Leave It There" on the album State Farm
- 1973 – Blind Arvella Gray, "Take Your Burden to the Lord" on the album The Singing Drifter
- 1973 – Sensational Nightingales, "Take Your Burdens to the Lord" on the album You and I and Everyone
- 1975 – Percy Humphrey and His Crescent City Joymakers, "Take Your Burden to the Lord" on the album Climax Rag
- 1976 – William Truckaway, "Leave It There" on the album Breakaway
- 1992 – Al Hobbs and the Indy Mass Choir, "Leave It There" on the album All Is Well
- 1993 – Tanya Goodman, "Leave It There" on the album Innocent Eyes
- 1994 – Rev. W. Leo Daniels with Mrs. Nevarro Daniels, "Leave It There" on the album So Happy
- 1995 – Blind Connie Williams, "Take Your Burden to the Lord" on the album Philadelphia Street Singer
- 1995 – The Fairfield Four, "Leave It There" on the album Standing on the Rock
- 1995 – Georgia Mass Choir, "Take Your Burden to the Lord" on the album Lord Take Me Through
- 1995 – Jimmy Hill and The Anointed Voices of Power, "Take Your Burden to the Lord" on the album Stop the Violence
- 1995 – The Horizon Family, "Leave It There" on the album Singing at the National Quartet Convention
- 1996 – Bill and Gloria Gaither, "Leave It There" on the album Moments to Remember
- 1996 – The Gospel Midgets, "Leave It There" on the album Whatcha Gonna Do
- 1996 – Rev. Oris Mays, "Take Your Burden to the Lord" on the album The Milky White Way
- 1997 – William Abney, "Take Your Burden to the Lord" on the album Songs of Grace
- 1998 – Clarence Clay and William Scott, "Take Your Burdens to the Lord" on the album Standing on the Highway
- 1998 – Dwight Gordon, "Take Your Burden" on the album I've Been Waiting
- 1998 – Rev. Raymond Wise and Family, "Leave It There" on the album Family: Singing Familiar Songs and Sayings
- 1999 – Willie Eason with The Campbell Brothers, "Take Your Burden to the Lord" on the album Sacred Steel – Live!
- 2000 – Soulful Heavenly Stars of New Orleans, "Take Your Burden to the Lord" on the album Who We Are
- 2000 – Sensational Southern Nightingales featuring Sidney Brown, "Take Your Burden to the Lord" on the album God's Given Touch
- 2001 – -N-Retro, "Leave It There" on the album Easy Listening Gospel
- 2001 – Shirley Sydnour and Erik Trauner, "Take Your Burden to the Lord" on the album I'll Fly Away
- 2002 – Body of Baptized Believers, "Leave It There" on the album No Question
- 2002 – Ehmandah, "Leave It There" on the album Spiritually Gifted: Speaking from the Soul
- 2002 – Randall Goodgame, "Leave It There" on the album The Hymnal
- 2002 – Rev. Phillip E. Knight, Sr., "Leave It There" on the album Save a Seat for Me
- 2003 – Gaither Vocal Band, "Leave It There" on the album A Cappella
- 2003 – Lynda Randle, "Leave It There" on the album Timeless
- 2004 – Jay Jay Bell and Friends, "Leave It There on the album Lord Send Me, I'll Go
- 2004 – Ray Skjelbred, "Take Your Burden to the Lord" on the album Plays Blues & Boogie Woogie
- 2005 – The Grace Thrillers, "Take Your Burden to the Lord" on the albums He Brought Me Out and Old Favourites
- 2006 – The Baker Girls, "Leave It There" on the album Don't Let the Makeup Fool You
- 2006 – John Cowan and Tony Rice, "Leave It There" on the album Voice of the Spirit, Gospel of the South
- 2006 – Jessy Dixon, "Leave It There" on the album Homecoming Classics
- 2007 – 2nd Chance, "Leave It There" on the album Heavenly Highway (The Highway to Heaven)
- 2007 – A. Bruce Frazier, "Leave It There" on the album That Old Time Religion: Now and Then
- 2007 – Barry Martyn, "Leave It There" on the album Jazz Hymn Fest
- 2007 – Dudley Smith, "Leave It There" on the album Dudley Smith ... Is Havin' Church!
- 2007 – Wings of Heaven, "Leave It There" on the album Upper Room Experience
- 2008 – Bill Gaither, "Leave It There" on the DVD A Campfire Homecoming
- 2008 – Kevin Gould, "Leave It There" on the album A Wineskin in the Smoke
- 2009 – Lance Odegard, "Leave It There" on the album After a Long Hard Winter, It's Good to Go Home
- 2010 – Otis Byrd, Jr and Adoration on the album The Experience
- 2010 – Garden State Choral Chapter, "Leave It There" on the album Reunion
- 2010 – Greg Lowery, "Leave It There" on the album Revival Hymns
- 2010 – Stan Whitmire, "Leave It There" on the album Shelter in the Storm
- 2012 – Mississippi Chris Sharp, "Take Your Burden To the Lord and Leave It There" on the album Redbugs
- 2012 – Munirih Sparrow, "Leave It There" on the album Nightsong
- 2013 – The Blind Boys of Alabama, "Take Your Burden to the Lord and Leave It There" on the album I'll Find a Way
- 2013 – Joey + Rory, "Leave It There" on the album Inspired: Songs of Faith & Family
- 2013 – Stuart MacDonald, "Leave It There" on the album Leave It There
- 2013 – Pig Irön, "Take Your Burden to the Lord" on the album Sermons From the Church of Blues Restitution
- 2014 – Sue Dodge, Lillie Knauls, Barbie Mason, The Stamps and J. D. Sumner, "Leave It There" on the album Bill Gaither's 30 Favorite Homecoming Hymns. (This version must have been recorded before Sumner's death in 1998.)
- 2015 – DeBusk-Weaver Family, "Leave It There" on the album Ola Belle Reed and Southern Mountain Music on the Mason-Dixon Line
- 2015 – Girish, "Leave It There" on the album Sky of the Heart

== Other songs ==
These songs have related titles to the Tindley song, but differ from it and from each other:

- 1965 – Pilgrim Jubilee Singers, "Take Your Burden to Jesus"; a different gospel song, perhaps based on the Tindley song
- 1995 – Odds, "Leave It There" on the album Good Weird Feeling
- 1997 – F. C. Barnes, "Take Your Burden (to Jesus)" on the albums Keep Me All the Way and A Live Reunion; a different gospel song
- 2002 – Juanita Wynn, "Leave It There" on the album U Don't Know; a different gospel song. It quotes the second line of the refrain of the Tindley song, and may have been inspired by it
- 2003 – Laura Frawley, "Leave It There" on the album Come Up Higher; a different gospel song. It has some similarities of wording to the Tindley song, and may have been inspired by it
