= Charles Henry Pace =

- Born: August 4, 1886; Atlanta, Georgia
- Died: December 16, 1963 (aged 77); Pittsburgh, Pennsylvania
- Occupations: Composer, publisher and choral director

Charles Henry Pace (August 4, 1886, Atlanta, Georgia – December 16, 1963, Pittsburgh, Pennsylvania) was an American composer, publisher, and choral director of Christian music.

At the age of 13, he relocated with his family to Chicago. There, he continued to study piano, and composed gospel songs and arranged spirituals for Beth Eden Baptist Church and for Liberty Baptist Church. In 1925, he founded Pace Jubilee Singers, a gospel group which recorded songs written by himself, Charles Albert Tindley, and others for Victor and for Brunswick Records 1926–1929. Thomas A. Dorsey briefly accompanied the group.

In 1936, Pace moved to Pittsburgh, where he founded the Pace Gospel Choral Union: an ensemble of 25 singers, enlarged to around 300 on special occasions, which performed gospel songs and spirituals. African-American churches in Pittsburgh and its suburbs would raise funds by having the ensemble perform for them. He also founded two music publishing houses in Pittsburgh: Old Ship of Zion Music Company (1936–1951) and Charles H. Pace Music Publishers (1952–1963), through which he published most of his 104 sacred compositions and arrangements and his 26 secular songs. Between 1941–1945, Old Ship of Zion Music Company had 301 agents committed to selling its songs, and 2,511 direct mail order customers in the U.S.; making it one of the best-known publishers of gospel music in America.

His gospel songs "are in the style of Tindley’s songs, with a verse-chorus structure, memorable melodies, and simple, effective harmonies". In a 1980 doctoral thesis for the University of Pittsburgh, Mary Tyler divided his 104 gospel songs into five categories: (1) personal testimonies, (2) questioning belief and introspection, (3) scriptural messages, (4) dialogue with God, and (5) personal counsel to listeners.

His archives are preserved at the University of Pittsburgh.

Some sources confuse or conflate him with Harry Pace (Harry Herbert Pace, 1884–1943), American music publisher and insurance executive, founder of Black Swan Records.
