= Theodore Frye =

American gospel composer and singer

Theodore Frye (September 10, 1899 – August 26, 1963) was an American gospel composer and singer and an early pioneer of the genre. Along with Thomas A. Dorsey, Frye established the first gospel choir at Ebenezer Missionary Baptist Church in Chicago. He worked with Roberta Martin in the 1930s, forming the Martin-Frye Quartet, and helped launch Mahalia Jackson's career in the 1940s. Frye was a cofounder of both the National Convention of Gospel Choirs and Choruses and the National Baptist Music Convention.
