= Calvin P. Dixon =

American preacher

Reverend Calvin P. Dixon

Personal life
- Died: November 4, 1946
- Known for: One of the first Black preachers to record sermons on phonograph records
- Other name: "Black Billy Sunday"
- Occupation: Preacher, evangelist

Religious life
- Religion: Christianity
- Denomination: Evangelical Christian Church

Reverend Calvin P. Dixon (died November 4, 1946) was a Black preacher notable as one of the first Black preacher to record a sermon record.

== Career ==
Dixon's home base was Newport News, Virginia. He appears to have started preaching in Canada before moving to Virginia and holding revivals in Georgia, Maryland, New England and North Carolina among other places. Rev. Dixon had a few unfortunate run ins with the law throughout his career. Immorality charges were dismissed early in his career and in 1922, he was arrested again for being out late at night with two girls. He asserted that he was just escorting them home. He was later charged for not having a muffler against ordinance and for being a public nuisance, a charge of which he was acquitted. On January 14, 1925, Rev. Dixon recorded the first set of his sermons for Columbia in New York. He returned on the 15th and 16th to record eight more. He was billed on the label as "Black Billy Sunday", a pseudonym under which he often worked. His first release was "As An Eagle Stirreth Up Her Nest" and "The Prodigal Son." He is considered the first Black person to record and release sermons on phonograph records. Also in 1925, he received a letter from the KKK and sent one to the original Billy Sunday. He became affiliated with the Evangelical Christian denomination in 1926, eventually becoming a president. In 1930 and into 1931, he broadcast church services on WGH radio from his Tabernacle. Preceded by his wife in 1944, Rev. Dixon died on November 4, 1946, with a funeral on the 8th followed by burial in Lincoln Memorial Cemetery.

== Notes ==
Dixon is not to be confused with Rev. J. Gordon McPherson, also billed as "Black Billy Sunday", who recorded for Paramount in 1931.
