= National Folk Festival (United States) =

Touring national folk festival in the United States

- Genre: Folk
- Dates: 1934 - Present
- Location: United States
- Years active: 1934–present
- Founders: National Council for the Traditional Arts
- Attendance: 175,000+
- Website: www.nationalfolkfestival.com

The National Folk Festival (NFF) is an itinerant folk festival in the United States. Since 1934, it has been run by the National Council for the Traditional Arts (NCTA) and has been presented in 26 communities around the nation. After leaving some of these communities, the National Folk Festival has spun off several locally run folk festivals in its wake, including the Lowell Folk Festival, the Richmond Folk Festival, the American Folk Festival and the Montana Folk Festival. The most recent spin-off is the North Carolina Folk Festival. The next year of the festival will be held in Jackson, Mississippi, in 2026, the second year of a two-year run in Jackson.

== Beginnings in St. Louis ==
The National Folk Festival in the United States (known also as the National) was founded by folklorist Sarah Gertrude Knott and first presented in St. Louis in 1934. The Festival is the oldest multi-cultural traditional arts celebration in the nation and the first event of national stature to put the arts of many nations, races and languages into the same event on an equal footing. Some of the artists presented at the first festival are now legendary and the recordings and other documentation made possible by the National are precious. W.C. Handy's first performance on a desegregated stage was at the 1938 National. It was the first event of national stature to present the blues, Cajun music, a polka band, a Tex-Mex conjunto, a Sacred Harp ensemble, Peking opera, and others.

== Locations ==
Number	Year(s)	Location
1	1934	St. Louis, Missouri
2	1935	Chattanooga, Tennessee
3	1936	Dallas, Texas
4	1937	Chicago, Illinois
5–9	1938–1942	Washington, D.C.
10–11	1943–1944	Philadelphia, Pennsylvania
12	1946	Cleveland, Ohio
13–21	1947–1955	St. Louis, Missouri
22	1957	Oklahoma City, Oklahoma
23	1959	Nashville, Tennessee
24–25	1960–1961	Washington, D.C.
26	1963	Covington, Kentucky
27	1964	Florence, Kentucky
28	1965	St. Petersburg, Florida
29	1966	Denver, Colorado
30	1967	Syracuse, New York
31	1968	Milwaukee, Wisconsin
32	1969	Knoxville, Tennessee
33–44	1971–1982	Vienna, Virginia at Wolf Trap
45–47	1983–1985	Cuyahoga Valley National Recreation Area, Ohio
48	1986	New York, New York
49–51	1987–1989	Lowell, Massachusetts
52–54	1990–1992	Johnstown, Pennsylvania
55–57	1993–1995	Chattanooga, Tennessee
58–60	1996–1998	Dayton, Ohio
61–63	1999–2001	East Lansing, Michigan
64–66	2002–2004	Bangor, Maine
67–69	2005–2007	Richmond, Virginia
70–72	2008–2010	Butte, Montana
73	2011	Nashville, Tennessee
74	2013	St. Louis, Missouri
75–77	2015–2017	Greensboro, North Carolina
78–81	2018–2019 2021–2022	Salisbury, Maryland
82-82	2025—2027	Jackson, Mississippi
