= Arizona Dranes =

American singer and pianist

- Born: Juanita Dranes; May 4, 1889 or May 4, 1891; Sherman, Texas
- Origin: Austin, Texas
- Died: July 27, 1963 (aged 72 or 74) Los Angeles, California
- Genres: Gospel
- Instruments: Voice and Piano
- Years active: 1920s–1940s

Juanita "Arizona" Dranes (May 4, 1889 or 1891 – July 27, 1963) was an American blind female gospel singer and pianist. Dranes was one of the first gospel artists to bring the musical styles of Holiness churches' religious music to the public in her records for Okeh Records and performances in the 1920s. She was also one of the first professional woman gospel singers. Her distinctive, nasal vocal style and piano playing that incorporated boogie and ragtime, influenced later gospel artists.

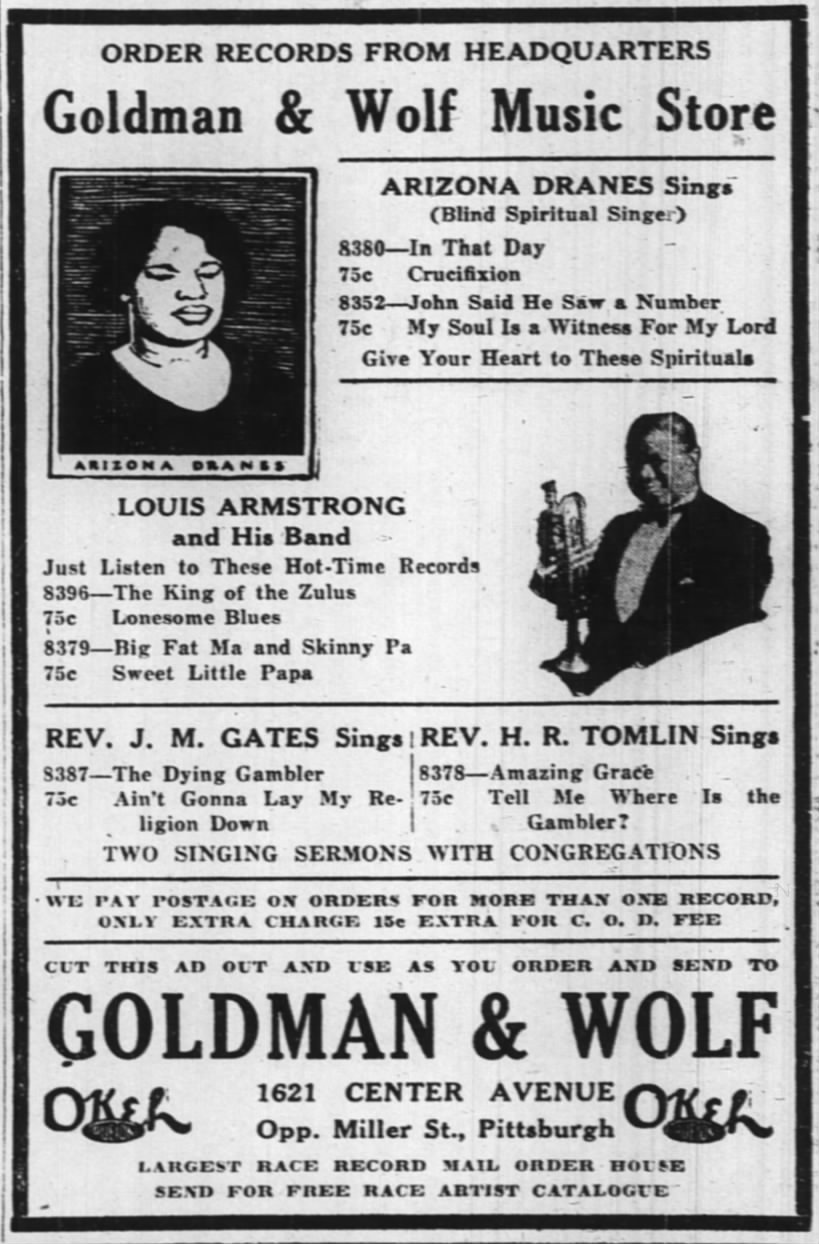
1926 advertisement for Okeh Records by Arizona Dranes and Louis Armstrong

== Biography ==
Juanita Drane (or possibly Drain) was born blind in 1889 or 1891 in Sherman, Texas. Drane attended the Texas Institute for Deaf, Dumb and Blind Colored Youth in Austin, Texas, from 1896 to 1910. She learned to play piano in her early teens.

Drane had been believed to be of both African-American and Mexican descent, but research by Michael Corcoran for He Is My Story: the Sanctified Soul of Arizona Dranes disproved Mexican heritage.

Her correct last name is "Drane", as listed in the official enrollment record for the 1896–1897 school year at the Texas School for the Blind and Visually Impaired. Her name was spelled "Drane" at school, though she was billed as "Dranes" later in life. Because both parents were illiterate, the surname was written down as it was pronounced. Corcoran's research found a probable cousin named "Doran," which would be pronounced "Drane" in the black southern dialect of the time.

== Career ==
After graduating from the Texas Institute, she returned to Sherman for ten years. Around 1922, Dranes joined the Church of God in Christ Church in Wichita Falls. She soon became a favored singer-pianist of the founder, Bishop Charles Mason and was well utilized in the COGIC circles. She incorporated a syncopated, ragtime style in her gospel accompaniment and soon established the songs "I Shall Wear A Crown," "My Soul's a Witness for the Lord," and "Lamb's Blood Has Washed Me Clean" as COGIC standards.

Dranes introduced piano accompaniment to Holiness music, which had previously been largely a cappella, and accompanied herself in the barrelhouse and ragtime styles popular at the time. She began recording in 1926 with Okeh Records, first as a solo artist and later with choirs and various other artists and groups. She was one of the first professional women gospel singers and sang at COGIC meetings in the Bible Belt, touring Texas, Tennessee, and Oklahoma.

Although she last recorded in 1928, she continued touring through the 1940s. She moved to Los Angeles in 1948 and died there on July 27, 1963. Later gospel artists, such as Roberta Martin and Clara Ward, were heavily influenced by her piano playing; Dranes' nasal singing style also influenced artists such as Sister Rosetta Tharpe.
