= Ebenezer Missionary Baptist Church (Chicago) =

Historic church in Illinois, United States

- U.S. National Register of Historic Places
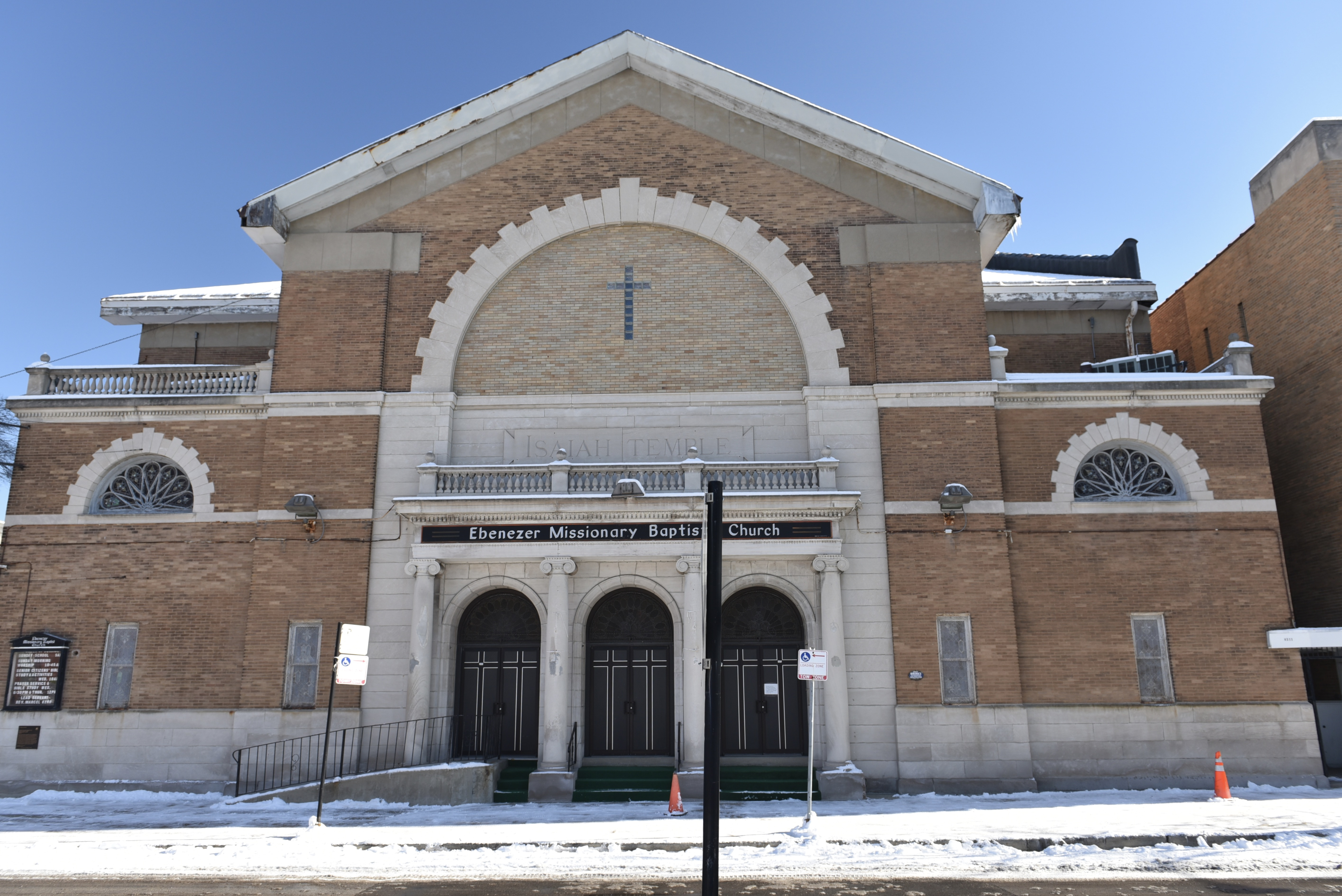

- Location within Chicago metropolitan area Location within Illinois Location within the United States
- Location: 4501 S. Vincennes Ave., Chicago, Illinois
- Coordinates: 41°48′46″N 87°36′50″W
- Built: 1899
- Architect: Dankmar Adler
- Architectural style: Neoclassical
- NRHP reference No.: 16000734
- Added to NRHP: October 24, 2016

The Ebenezer Missionary Baptist Church is a historic church at 4501 S. Vincennes Avenue in the Grand Boulevard community area of Chicago, Illinois. Built in 1899, the building was originally a synagogue for the Isaiah Temple congregation. Architect Dankmar Adler, who partnered with Louis Sullivan to build many of Chicago's early skyscrapers, designed the Neoclassical building; Adler was the son of a rabbi, and he designed several other synagogues in Chicago.

African-American settlement changed the demographics of the neighborhood in the early twentieth century, and the Isaiah Temple congregation sold the building to the black Ebenezer Missionary Baptist Church congregation in 1921. The first gospel choir was formed in the church in 1931, and its leaders Thomas A. Dorsey, Theodore Frye, and Roberta Martin were responsible for popularizing gospel music in Chicago's black churches. The church's choir helped launch the careers of many prominent gospel musicians, including Mahalia Jackson, Sallie Martin, and Dinah Washington; rock and roll pioneer Bo Diddley also performed in the church's orchestra.

The church was added to the National Register of Historic Places on October 24, 2016.
