= Sarah Gertrude Knott =

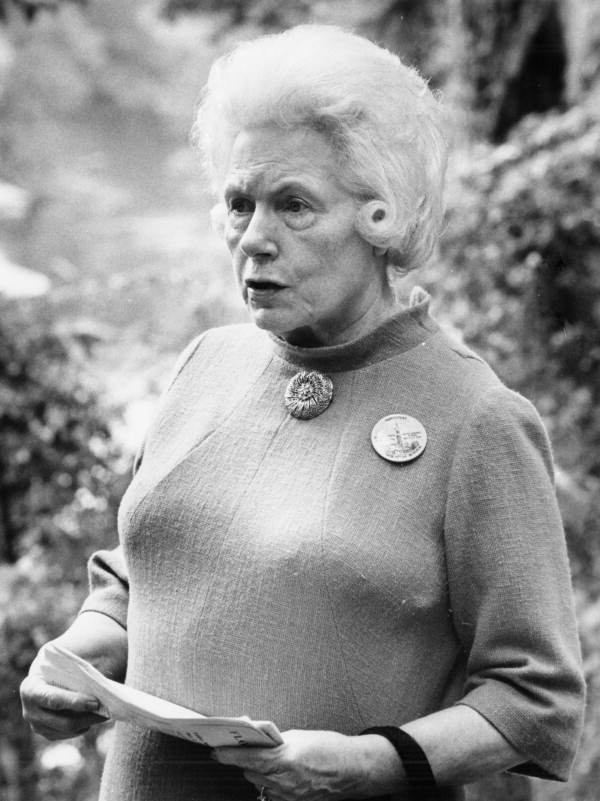
- Born: 1895
- Died: November 20, 1994
- Occupation: Actor

Sarah Gertrude Knott (1895 Kevil, Kentucky – 1984) was an American folklorist and folk festival organizer.

== Early life ==
Sarah Gertrude Knott was born in 1895 in Kevil, Kentucky. She created the National Folk Festival Association in 1933 and founded the National Folk Festival, first held in St. Louis, in 1934.

== Works ==
- "The National Folk Festival after Twelve Years", California Folklore Quarterly, Vol. 5, No. 1 (Jan., 1946), pp. 83–93
