= H. B. Parks =

American clergyman

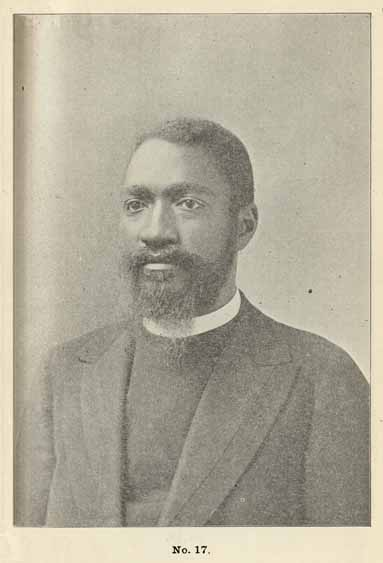
Bishop H. B. Parks (1856-1936) of the African Methodist Episcopal Church, photographed in 1906.

Henry Blanton Parks (1856–1936) was an African American clergyman. He served as Bishop of the twelfth Episcopal district of the African Methodist Episcopal Church. In 1896–7 he was appointed secretary of the church's Missionary department.
