= Roberta Martin =

American gospel musician and choral organizer (1907–1969)

Background information
- Born: Roberta Evelyn Martin; February 12, 1907; Helena, Arkansas, U.S.
- Died: January 18, 1969 (aged 61) Mercy Hospital, Chicago, Illinois, U.S.
- Genre: Gospel music
- Occupations: Vocalist, composer
- Instrument: Piano
- Years active: 1930s–1969
- Labels: Apollo, Savoy
- Formerly of: The Roberta Martin Singers

Roberta Evelyn Martin (February 12, 1907 – January 18, 1969) was an American gospel composer, singer, pianist, arranger and choral organizer, helped launch the careers of many other gospel artists through her group, The Roberta Martin Singers.

== Early years ==
Born in Helena, Arkansas, on February 12, 1907, Martin moved to Chicago with her family in 1917, where she studied piano. Although a high school teacher inspired her to dream of becoming a concert pianist, her future course was changed after accompanying the Young People's Choir at Ebenezer Baptist Church. She came into contact with Thomas A. Dorsey, known as the Father of Gospel Music, through her work as the pianist for the youth choir. With Dorsey's help, she and Theodore Frye organized the Martin-Frye Quartet, a youth group consisting of Eugene Smith, Norsalus McKissick, Robert Anderson, James Lawrence, Willie Webb and Romance Watson, in 1933. Martin renamed the group the Roberta Martin Singers in 1936 and added Bessie Folk, Myrtle Scott and Delois Barrett Campbell to the group in the 1940s. The group set the standard for the gospel choir and mixed group, and had an extremely successful recording career, featuring such hits as "Only A Look," and "Grace."

Most of these songs were published by Roberta Martin Studio of Music, a publishing house in Chicago that she incorporated in 1939, and would eventually publish outstanding compositions by gospel artists ranging from Professor Alex Bradford to James Cleveland. Her first composition, "Try Jesus, He Satisfies," was an immediate hit in 1943.

== Musical career ==
The theme song of the Roberta Martin Singers is "Only A Look." It was always sung at the opening of their concerts, at their annual Anniversary Program in Chicago, and was recorded on the Apollo label with Bessie Folk with Delois Barrett as lead soloists and later on the Savoy label with Delois Barrett as lead vocalist.

Martin complemented her group's performance with her piano accompaniment, which often dictated the rhythm and pace of the song or commented on it by responding to or accenting a singer's performance. Martin's piano style reflected the influence of Holiness artists such as Arizona Dranes and her classical training.

The other musical signature of the Roberta Martin Singers was the accompaniment of "Little" Lucy Smith on the Hammond organ. Her droning introductory chord and unique "passes" using the bass pedals set the tone for a meditative experience and became a recognized trademark of a "Roberta Martin gospel song".

Martin briefly retired from music in the 1960s due in part to her battle with cancer, but came back to record her final album Praise God (from whom all blessings flow), and her vocal recording, "I Have Hope", which was written by her friend Jessie Jimerson (a.k.a. Jessie Jimerson-Phillips).

Her group disbanded upon her death in 1969, but the surviving members continued to perform as a group in reunion concerts into the 21st century. Many of the members later had solo careers, such as Delois Barrett and Gloria Griffin, who was the composer of the classic gospel song "God Specializes", made famous by the Roberta Martin Singers in concerts and recordings.

== Death and legacy ==
Roberta Martin died of cancer on January 18, 1969, at the age of 61, at Mercy Hospital, Chicago. Her funeral attracted over 50,000 mourners.

During her lifetime, she had composed about seventy songs, arranged and published 280 gospel songs, and reached and inspired thousands of listeners selling sheet music. Her compositions include "He Knows Just How Much We Can Bear," and "God Is Still on the Throne" (1959), "Let It Be" (1950), and "Just Jesus and Me" (1966). Martin earned six Gold records.

The Roberta Martin Singers sang at Gian-Carlo Menotti's Spoleto Festival of Two Worlds in Spoleto, Italy, in 1963. She helped develop a distinctive gospel-piano style which had a special sound that integrated, for the first time, men and women into the gospel chorus during the mid-1940s.

On July 15, 1998, the United States Postal Service issued a 32 cent commemorative stamp honoring Martin's influence. The stamp was one of four honoring gospel women. The other women honored were Mahalia Jackson, Clara Ward, and Sister Rosetta Tharpe.
