= Charles Albert Tindley =

American minister and composer (1851–1933)

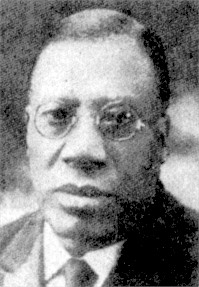
- Born: Charles Tindley; July 7, 1851; Berlin, Maryland, U.S.
- Died: July 26, 1933 (aged 82); Philadelphia, Pennsylvania, U.S.
- Resting place: Eden Cemetery, Collingdale, Pennsylvania, U.S.
- Occupations: minister, composer
- Spouse: Daisy Henry

Charles Albert Tindley (July 7, 1851 – July 26, 1933) was an African-American Methodist minister and gospel music composer. His composition "I'll Overcome Someday" is credited as the basis for the U.S. Civil Rights anthem "We Shall Overcome". Another of his hymns is "Take Your Burden to the Lord and Leave It There" (1916), as well as "What Are They Doing in Heaven?" (1901).

Often referred to as "The Prince of Preachers", he educated himself, became a minister and founded one of the largest Methodist congregations serving the African-American community on the East Coast of the United States.

== Early life and education ==
Tindley was born in Berlin, Maryland, on July 7, 1851. He was born a free man prior to the American Civil War, but had a deep and intimate understanding of the system of slavery in the United States because his father was an enslaved man and because he himself had grown up around enslaved people. Tindley's status was based on antebellum slavery codes which determined that he was a free man because his mother was a free woman.

After the Civil War, he moved to Philadelphia, where he found employment as a hod carrier (brick carrier). He and his wife Daisy attended the Bainbridge St. Methodist Episcopal Church. Charles later became the sexton, a job with no salary.

Though he had no formal schooling, Tindley learned to read by sounding out letters and eventually words from pieces of paper with writing that he found. He mastered reading so well that later he enlisted the help of a Reform Congregation Keneseth Israel, a synagogue on North Broad Street in Philadelphia, to learn Hebrew. He later learned Greek by taking a correspondence course through Boston Theological School.

== Church ==
Without any degree, Tindley was qualified for ordination in the Methodist Episcopal Church by examination, with high ranking scores. He was ordained as a Deacon in the Delaware Conference in 1887 and as an elder in 1889. As was the practice of the ME church, Tindley was assigned by his bishop to serve as an itinerant pastor staying a relatively short time at each charge: 1885 to Cape May, New Jersey; 1887 to South Wilmington, Delaware; 1889 to Odessa, Delaware; 1891 to Pocomoke, Maryland; 1894 to Fairmount, Maryland; and 1897 to Wilmington, Delaware, at Ezion Methodist Church. In 1900 he became the Presiding Elder of the Wilmington District.

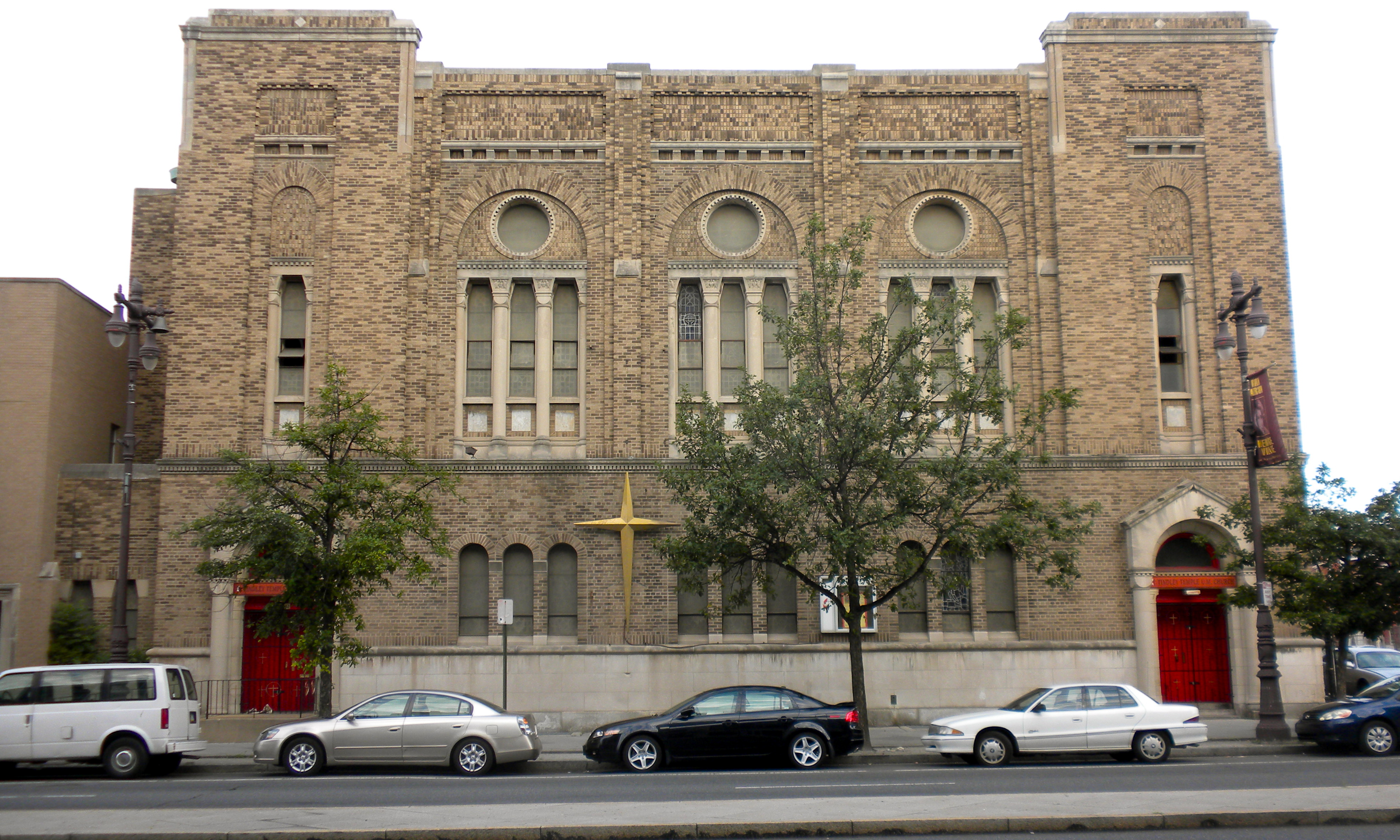
Tindley Temple

Tindley then became the pastor of the same church in Philadelphia at which he had been a janitor. Under his leadership, the church grew rapidly from the 130 members it had when he arrived. In 1906 the congregation moved from Bainbridge Street to Broad and Fitzwater Streets, and was renamed East Calvary Methodist Episcopal Church. The property was purchased from the Westminster Presbyterian church and seated 900, though it was soon filled to overflowing. The congregation over time grew to a multiracial congregation of 10,000. After his death, the church was renamed "Tindley Temple". The Tindley Temple United Methodist Church was added to the National Register of Historic Places in 2011.

Tindley was acquainted with politicians and business leaders in Philadelphia, including John Wanamaker. He worked with business leaders to assist his members in finding jobs. He also encouraged members to start their own businesses and purchase homes. The church formed the East Calvary Building and Loan Association to offer mortgages. Tindley also solicited donations from businessmen of food for the congregation's ministry of feeding the needy.

Tindley objected to social events that he considered degrading, including the 1912 Cake Walk and Ball, and The Soap Box Minstrels show at the Philadelphia Academy of Music at Broad and Locust Streets. In 1915, Tindley and other leaders, including Rev. Wesley Graham, led protesters in a march to the Forrest Theater to protest against the showing of D. W. Griffith's film The Birth of a Nation. They were attacked by whites with clubs, sticks, and bottles. Graham was hospitalized; Tindley's injuries were treated at home.

Tindley was awarded a Doctor of Divinity degree by Bennett College and Morgan College in Baltimore, Maryland.

== Compositions ==
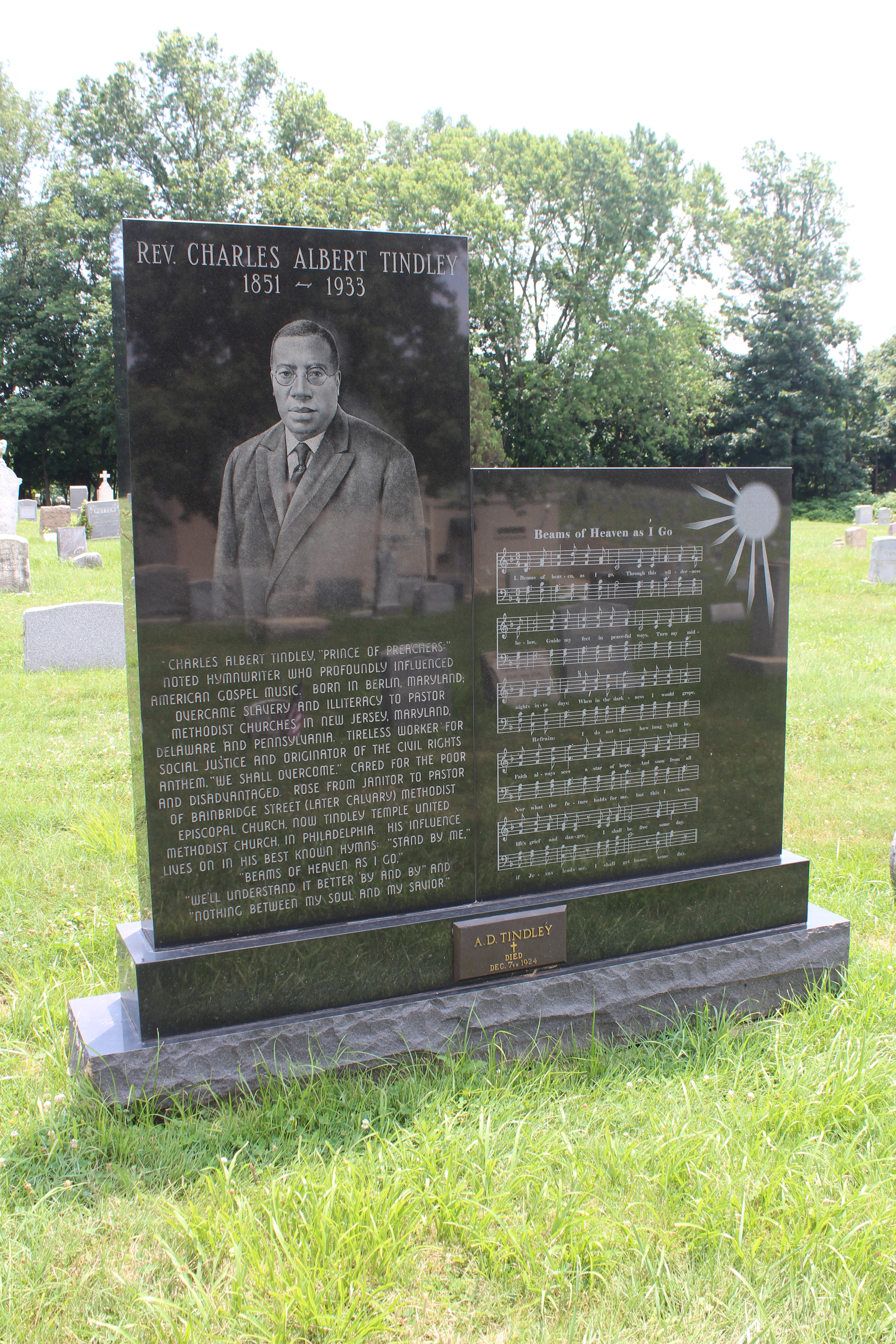
Charles Albert Tindley gravestone in Eden Cemetery, Collingdale, Pennsylvania

Tindley was a noted songwriter and composer of gospel hymns and is recognized as one of the founding fathers of American gospel music. Five of his hymns appear in the 1989 United Methodist Hymnal. His composition "I'll Overcome Someday" is credited by observers to be the basis for the U.S. Civil Rights anthem "We Shall Overcome." Another of his notable hymns is "(Take Your Burden to the Lord and) Leave It There" (1916), which has been included in several hymnals and has been recorded by numerous artists in a variety of styles. Others are "Stand by Me" (1905) and "What Are They Doing in Heaven?" (1901).

Tindley published his songs beginning in 1901, and published several hymn collections, including Soul Echoes in 1905 (enlarged edition "No. 2", 1909) and a series beginning with New Songs Of Paradise! in 1916. A posthumous New Songs of Paradise, No. 6 in 1941 was the first collection to bring together all 46 of Tindley's published hymns, though in some cases stanzas that had previously been published were left out. Beams of Heaven: Hymns of Charles Albert Tindley (1851-1933) (2006) restores the full original complement of verses.

He died on July 26, 1933, in Philadelphia, Pennsylvania and is interred at Eden Cemetery in Collingdale, Pennsylvania.

== In popular media ==
Tindley is the subject of a children's picture book by poet Carole Boston Weatherford and artist Bryan Collier.

== See also ==
- Category:Hymns by Charles Albert Tindley
