= Willie Mae Ford Smith =

American gospel singer (1904–1994)

- Smith in the late 1980s

Background information
- Also known as: Mother Willie Mae Ford Smith
- Born: Willie Mae Ford; June 23, 1904; Rolling Fork, Mississippi, U.S.
- Died: February 2, 1994 (aged 89) St. Louis, Missouri, U.S.
- Genres: Gospel
- Occupations: Singer, composer, arranger
- Years active: 1931–1985

Willie Mae Ford Smith (June 23, 1904 – February 2, 1994) was an American musician and Christian evangelist instrumental in the development and spread of gospel music in the United States. She grew up singing with her family, joining a quartet with her sisters. Later she became acquainted with Thomas A. Dorsey, the "Father of Gospel Music", when he co-founded the National Convention of Gospel Choirs and Choruses in 1932. Smith started the St. Louis chapter and became the director of the national organization's Soloist's Bureau, training up and coming singers in the gospel blues style. She became known for her nurturing temperament, leading to her commonly being called "Mother Smith" by those within her musical circle. For a decade she traveled ceaselessly tutoring, singing, and preaching in churches and at revivals. Her appearances were renowned for being intensely moving spiritual experiences.

A devout Christian, she rejected commercializing gospel music throughout her life, even during gospel's "golden age". Smith chose to perform live and on the radio rather than record. She was ordained as a minister and preached at a church in St. Louis, Missouri, for 30 years. However, not until the 1980s did she become known to mainstream audiences. She was the primary focus of the 1982 documentary film Say Amen, Somebody, about gospel singers in the U.S. Author Anthony Heilbut states, "her admirers and protégés are legion. This is simply the most influential female gospel singer of all time, and in the opinion of many, many fans, the greatest."

== Early life (1904–1921) ==
Born in Rolling Fork, Mississippi, Willie Mae was the seventh of fourteen children of Clarence Ford, a railroad brakeman, and Mary Williams. Soon after she was born, her family relocated to Memphis, Tennessee for her father's work.

Willie Mae became familiar with blues from hearing it coming from a disreputable clubhouse adjacent to her family's Memphis back yard when she was still a toddler. Bar patrons tossed coins to hear her sing "Boll Weevil". The Fords moved to St. Louis, Missouri in 1917, and Mary started a restaurant where Willie Mae worked after dropping out of school in the eighth grade. Her parents were devout Christians, her father a deacon in their church. They fostered a love of singing, eventually encouraging Willie Mae and her sisters Mary, Emma, and Geneva to perform at their local church, True Light. They enjoyed it so much they formed a singing quartet called the Ford Sisters. Their reception at events, including the 1922 National Baptist Convention, was lukewarm.

In the early 20th century, music at urban black churches throughout the U.S. was formal and refined. Choirs performed sophisticated material from classical European composers, like Handel and Mozart, more to show their musical abilities than reiterate a spiritual message through music. Personalizing songs by improvising with melody, lyrics, and rhythm was generally not tolerated under the belief that it was common and undignified. In this light, Smith later said that the National Baptist Convention "hadn't really accepted gospel".

== Introduction to gospel blues (1922–1930) ==
"Dorsey, come on, man, you've got to go on down here. It's a woman down there from," I think he said, "St. Louis, or Kansas City, somewhere in Missouri, man. She's got that 'If You See My Savior.' She's laying them out in the aisle and the folk are just jumping and going on. Man, you got to see them." I said, "Oh, I ain't got time." He said, "No, come on, get ready, get ready; I'll be back at such and such a time. They kind of out for dinner now; you get ready and come and go." I did.

— Thomas A. Dorsey

As her sisters grew, married, and had families, Willie Mae continued as a soloist, even after her 1924 marriage to James Smith, a man 19 years her senior who owned a general hauling business. James encouraged her to accept requests to sing in church, and expressed pride in her voice. Willie Mae was a talented soprano who seriously considered a career in classical music. However, at the 1926 National Baptist Convention, she heard a woman named Artelia Hutchins singing in a new style and changed her mind: "I knew then I had to be a gospel singer." Having two children, Willie James and Jacquelyn, did not make her any less determined.

In 1930, Smith had an auspicious meeting with Thomas A. Dorsey, a blues musician who had attempted to make a living writing gospel music without success. Two years before, Dorsey had a spiritual conversion after a bout of depression. His downstairs neighbor, also a good friend, died unexpectedly, and both events inspired him to write "If You See My Savior, Tell Him That You Saw Me". It was the first song Dorsey wrote that combined a blues structure to gospel lyrics.

Despite his best efforts, Dorsey found it impossible to sell his sheet music or break into the inner workings of Chicago's black churches. As a blues singer, his involvement in a culture widely considered to be sinful would not have been well received in churches, particularly in a position of leadership, which he was seeking. Dorsey thus had neither the time or interest in attending the National Baptist Convention in his home city of Chicago. Though he had gone in previous years, Dorsey stayed home in 1930. Smith traveled from St. Louis to the convention, with 15,000 attendees, and sang Dorsey's "If You See My Savior" to the general morning gathering. Upon hearing her, the audience was greatly moved. Smith performed it twice more on request; Dorsey, who did not know Smith before the convention, was beckoned to rush there where he sold 4,000 copies of his song. It led to his permanent position as music director at Chicago's Pilgrim Baptist Church, allowing him to focus entirely on gospel music.

Though Smith went home to St. Louis, Dorsey started the first gospel choir in 1931, and when demand proved it was needed, he co-founded the National Convention of Gospel Choirs and Choruses (NCGCC), an organization dedicated to training gospel singers in Chicago and throughout the U.S. the next year. Smith established the St. Louis chapter immediately.

== Touring evangelist (1931–1950) ==
In 1931, Smith began to accept invitations to sing in other cities, turning into a 20-year run of touring churches and revivals throughout the U.S. Initially these engagements were meant to augment her husband's income, though it turned into a personal crusade. Smith's voice had developed into a booming contralto by this time. Accompanying her was an adopted daughter named Bertha, the two of them sharing a musical connection that was evident in their charismatic performances. Smith furthermore started her tenure running the Education Department of the National Baptist Convention; a role that lasted 17 years.

When the Holy Ghost hit me, I hit the floor. On the train coming back to St. Louis, I kept everybody up all night long, trying to talk, speaking in tongues.... Honey, this child got soused good. The Lord had to fix me up, because you see I was a wild person, just like a wild buck. I made fun of holiness people. I laughed at 'em and tried to do the holy dance. I would just cut up.

— Willie Mae Ford Smith

At the National Baptist Convention of 1937, Smith debuted her first composition, "If You Just Keep Still". A year later, she experienced a deep spiritual conversion when she underwent baptism in the Holy Spirit, whereupon she began speaking in tongues, leading her to become a member of the Church of God Apostolic. This experience caused Smith to change her lifestyle. She rejected the secular music she previously enjoyed, saying the blues and jazz artists such as Count Basie, Bessie Smith, and Cab Calloway no longer held any appeal for her. She proclaimed she was being called upon by God to minister. She was not always accepted. Multiple churches and pastors rejected her singing style for being unrefined. They also complained that she moved too much during her songs, and they disliked women delivering spiritual messages.

With a new intensity, however, Smith began delivering short sermons before and sometimes during songs when she was invited to sing. The blend of spoken word spiritual messages delivered alongside religious songs became known as the song-and-sermonette style of preaching, something that Smith was profoundly adept at doing. Congregations were often enthralled; gospel singer Alex Bradford likened her effect to weaving a spell with a single note. According to Anthony Heilbut, "Those who attended her programs consider them some of the deepest experiences of their lives." Women in the audience of one Smith performance threw their handkerchiefs and purses at her after hearing her rendition of "The Lifeboat Is Coming". Other singers dreaded following her as the audience wept and shouted, drowning out the next performer. Presenting a dramatic flair, she often donned a silken cape while she preached and sang in a dynamic fervor. Smith was not shy about arriving to her own engagements hours late to find the entire church full and eagerly awaiting her. Her influence and demand for her performances were at their peak during this time. She was hailed and revered by those who had attended her services. It was not uncommon for her to arrive with an entourage at the train station in St. Louis after a long tour and be met by a crowd, the Pullman porters bowing as she stepped regally off the train.

Smith became the head of the Soloists Bureau of the NCGCC in 1939, where she proved herself to be a gifted educator. Using simple compositions more often associated with children, such as "Jesus Loves Me" and "What A Friend We Have In Jesus", she demonstrated how to make them dramatic, powerful statements of faith: "I told the singers, don't laugh at these children's songs... Emphasize, meditate on the meaning. We're children too, and we need [God] bad. You can take the simplest message and if you sing out of your soul, you'll hit home." Former student Martha Bass recalls in addition to rehearsing songs, Smith's instruction addressed how to enter and exit the church, and how to speak and behave in front of the congregation. Smith trained or was otherwise associated with some of the most successful singing acts in gospel music, such as Mahalia Jackson, the Ward Singers, the Roberta Martin Singers, the Caravans, and Inez Andrews. Roberta Martin used Smith's arrangement of "What A Friend We Have In Jesus" as her signature song, as did J. Earle Hines of the St. Paul Baptist Church in South-Central Los Angeles, with "God Be With You". Several singers admit to being directly inspired to sing gospel blues after hearing Smith, including Edna Gallmon Cooke, Myrtle Scott, Goldia Haynes, and "Brother" Joe May.

Part of her touring entourage included younger singers under her tutelage. She took them to perform with her at "Willie Mae Ford Smith Specials", and earned her enduring "Mother" sobriquet by caring for her singers: "When we'd go out of town, I was their mother until we came back home. Anyone who was in distress, Mother Smith could help out, give money or part of my clothes." Her devotion and belief that God had called her to travel and minister to people through song was unshakable, though it disrupted her family's life and she felt a keen sadness at leaving her own children behind. She traveled so extensively that she was home only one week a month for about ten years. Much of the childrearing during the 1930s was passed to relatives. This became a sensitive point in her marriage and was remembered with mixed feelings by her adult children later in their lives. At one point, her husband, himself a devout deacon at their church, forbade her from leaving. To enforce this he once chased her down on a train about to depart. He fell down a baggage elevator, injuring himself, which Smith took as evidence of Divine intervention. Her husband did too, as he stopped trying to impede her any further.

Throughout her life, Smith steadfastly refused to commercialize her performances by asking to get paid. She took offerings for her services but the compensation was meager, at times barely covering her train fares and accommodations. Sometimes she had to request money from her husband to get home, which he obliged. She ended the decade on a high note, however, joining Mahalia Jackson for an Easter Sunrise concert at the Hollywood Bowl in Los Angeles in 1949.

== Later life (1950–1994) ==
Gospel music enjoyed its "golden age" between 1945 and 1960, but Smith's travels slowed and she became more settled when her husband James died in 1950, and her accompanist and daughter Bertha was unable to travel as frequently. Many gospel singing groups and soloists that Smith had trained pursued recording careers, some seeing considerable success. Smith recorded three singles around 1950, but true to her aversion of commercialism, she declined a recording career and preferred to perform in churches, revivals, and live on radio. She acknowledged her influence on Brother Joe May in particular, whose recordings were mirrors of her arrangements, offering them as a reason recording herself was unnecessary.

After being told that her church forbade her – or any woman – from speaking at the pulpit, Smith began attending – and then was ordained as a minister – at the Lively Stone Apostolic Church in St. Louis in the 1950s. She continued to sing and preach there until the 1980s. Outside of gospel, Smith remained mostly unknown until 1972 when she appeared at the Newport Jazz Festival, singing sacred music. This led to her participation at a gospel concert alongside Marion Williams and Jessy Dixon at Radio City Music Hall. Reviewing the concert, the New York Times, described Smith's manner as an "evangelical seriousness that more closely resembled operatic stage presence". The next year, at 67 years old, she recorded her first album, I Believe I'll Run On, and in 1975, her second, Going On With the Spirit.

Smith was the primary focus of the critically acclaimed documentary film Say Amen, Somebody, released in 1982, where she describes her efforts to spread gospel and the obstacles she faced when first getting started. Aged 77 at the time of filming, Smith sings with her family in her kitchen, at the 1981 NCGCC meeting, and at a tribute concert organized by the film's director, George Nierenberg. She also mentors a young Zella Jackson Price, who expresses her difficulty reconciling the need to be at home with her family while being called on by God to sing. Guiding her protégée behind the scenes, Smith insisted that Price be included in the film. Four of Smith's songs in Say Amen, Somebody were included on the soundtrack, released in 1983.

The same year, she released her final album titled I Am Bound For Canaan Land, her only album to capture the ambient sounds of the participating audience with her voice. She stayed active singing and visiting nursing homes until 1985. One of Smith's final appearances was at a reunion concert for the singers featured in Say Amen, Somebody held in 1986 at the Fox Theater in St. Louis. Frail, in a wheelchair, and considerably thinner, she was barely able to sing, but prompted a rousing call and response among the audience. As observed by Harper Barnes, a reporter at the St. Louis Post-Dispatch, "as she kept speaking her words grew louder and stronger and turned into a hypnotic chant and the audience began responding as if the soaring parapets of the Fox were the walls of a church".

Smith was among twelve folk artists declared "living treasures" by the National Endowment for the Arts when she was awarded the National Heritage Fellowship in 1988, the highest honor given to American folk and traditional artists. She received a grant of $5,000. The next year, she was among 75 black American women included in the book I Dream a World: Portraits of Black Women Who Changed America. She died at age 89 of congestive heart failure at the Tower Village Nursing Home in 1994. A crowd of 500 celebrated her life at Lively Stone Apostolic Church where she preached and sang for 30 years. She is buried at St. Peter's Cemetery in St. Louis.

== Legacy ==
Mother Smith ... was Holy-Ghost filled... She was dramatic. When she said she felt like flying away, in your mind's eye, you could visualize this... She had power in her voice [and] in her expression. She was a singer. I've seen her walk out singing... on the way to her next appearance... and folks is just shoutin' everywhere, hats flyin' and carryin' on, just somethin' terrible. She'd come in and just wreck all them buildings. That was Mother Smith, and she loved it.

— Zella Jackson Price

Labeled "one of the most important gospel singers of the century" by The New York Times, Smith is considered a pioneer in the same vein as Thomas A. Dorsey, the "Father of Gospel Music". While Dorsey wrote 1,000 gospel songs and set standards for gospel choirs, Smith created the "openly emotional and spiritually exuberant performance style" so characteristic of gospel blues. In her heyday, Dorsey considered her more talented than blues singer Bessie Smith had she deigned to record secular music. Willie Mae Ford Smith furthermore embodied music as opposed to considering it a profession or hobby. In Black Music Research Journal, William Dargan writes, "Singing has been for Willie Mae Ford Smith a world in which she lives, rather than a mere phase of life she has picked up and put down." Watching her perform late in life, reporter Harper Barnes observed Smith's "remarkable, charismatic blend of pride and humility" that fueled her dramatic performances and her lifelong philosophy to reject commercialism and fame for piousness.

Smith was an inspiration to generations of gospel singers, a towering figure in black churches. Martha Bass remembered, "She had such joy, such a lovely personality. It would shine out beautifully... She used to sing a song called 'Give Me Wings,' and she made us feel like we were on wings. She was just real, that's all. If you don't sing inwardly, you can't sing outwardly."

However, outside of the gospel blues niche, she was relatively unknown until the release of Say Amen, Somebody when mainstream media began to try to quantify Smith's vocal abilities and their effects on the listener. Smith's delivery was described by Richard Harrington in the Washington Post as "a free, physical style that emphasized the beat and seemed closer to jazz and blues than to spirituals". And the St. Louis Post-Dispatch credited her personally for "contributions that have advanced gospel singing to an art form". Holding Smith responsible for the creation and popularization of the song-and-sermonette method of preaching, the National Endowment for the Arts attributes her influence to "her distinctive singing style, which brought to the gospel repertoire the range of vocal effects she heard as a young girl in country churches. She ornamented and bent the tones of the straightforward hymns that she preferred. She helped the great Mahalia Jackson develop the 'flowers and feathers' that so adorned her vocal style... Above all, she sang out of emotion, using every vocal effect from growling to crooning to express her sense of the moment."

== Honors ==
- National Endowment of the Arts National Heritage Fellowship, awarded 1988
- St. Louis Walk of Fame, awarded 1988: star located at 6392 Delmar Boulevard

== Discography ==
Singles

- "Call Him" / "Jesus Is the Name" Gotham G667, ca. 1950
- "Goin' On With the Spirit" / "Pilot, Take My Hand" Sacred 6015, ca. 1950
- "Give Me Wings" / "What Manner of Man" ca. 1950

Albums

- I Believe I'll Run On, Nashboro 7124, 1973
- Going On With the Spirit, Nashboro 7148, 1975
- I Am Bound For Canaan Land, Savoy Records 14739, 1983

Other appearances

- Say Amen, Somebody: Original Soundtrack Recording and More, DRG Records – SB2L 12584, 1983
- Mother Smith and Her Children, Spirit Feel 1010, 1989 (with Martha Bass, Brother Joe May, and Edna Gallmon Cooke)

== See also ==
- Shirley Caesar
- Sallie Martin
