= The Barrett Sisters =

American gospel trio

- Origin: Chicago, Illinois, United States
- Genres: Gospel
- Members: Tina Brown
- Past members: DeLois Barrett Campbell; Billie Barrett GreenBey; Rodessa Barrett Porter Johnnie Mae Hudson
- Website: The Barrett Sisters

The Barrett Sisters were an American gospel trio from Chicago, Illinois. The trio consisted of sisters DeLois Barrett Campbell (1926–2011), Billie Barrett GreenBey (1928–2020), and Rodessa Barrett Porter (1930–2024). They sang together for more than 40 years.

== History ==
The Barrett Sisters grew up in Chicago, Illinois. DeLois was born in Chicago in 1926 to Susie (Williams) Barrett and Deacon Lonnie Barrett, a staunch Baptist from Mississippi.

DeLois and sisters Billie GreenBey and Rodessa Porter spent a good deal of their childhood singing around the house and in the choir of The Morning Star Baptist Church at 3991 South Park Boulevard on Chicago's South Side. They had seven siblings, four of whom died in childhood of tuberculosis.

In 1936, under the direction of an aunt, choir director Mattie Dacus, the trio teamed up with a cousin named Johnnie Mae Hudson and sang local engagements billed as The Barrett and Hudson Singers. When Johnnie Mae died in 1950, Rodessa replaced her, and the group was renamed The Barrett Sisters.

While still a senior at Englewood High School, DeLois was recruited by The Roberta Martin Singers, a seminal group from the Pilgrim Baptist Church that was known for its stellar roster of lead male voices, notably Robert Anderson and Norsalus McKissick. She toured and sang with the troupe until the early 1960s, when Ms. Martin encouraged her to begin an independent recording career in a trio with her sisters and as a solo artist.

In the mid-1960s, the sisters recorded their first album on Savoy Records, "Jesus Loves Me", on which they recorded Sam Cooke's "Wonderful". They followed with "I'll Fly Away" and "Carry Me Back", where they were joined with Roberta Martin on "I Hear God". Ms. Martin sang lead on the title track.

In the 1970s they recorded two albums for Nashboro's subsidiary label Creed: "God So Loved The World" and "Coming Again So Soon". Ms. Campbell followed with a solo album also on Creed called "Through It All". They have recorded more than eleven albums in all.

Over their career, The Barrett Sisters have toured internationally over thirty times. The Barrett Sisters have performed at countless churches and in many respected concert halls, including the Lincoln Center in NYC, Constitution Hall in Washington, DC, Orchestra Hall in Chicago, and Theatre-DeVille in Paris, France.

The Barrett Sisters represented the United States in Africa, as Goodwill Ambassadors of 1983, and in the South Pacific for six weeks in 1987. They have also performed for several notable leaders including the King of Sweden and the President of Zaire. The Barrett Sisters are associated with numerous celebrities and big names in entertainment including the late Queen of Gospel Albertina Walker, Dorothy Love Coates, Thomas A. Dorsey (National Singers Convention), Rev. James Cleveland, Andraé Crouch, The Mighty Clouds of Joy, Shirley Caesar, The Clark Sisters, The Winans, Willie Mae Ford Smith, Jennifer Hudson, and Patti LaBelle.

== Radio, television, and film ==
The Barrett Sisters made their first appearance on radio and television in the 1960s. They have appeared on "The Tonight Show Starring Johnny Carson," "The Oprah Winfrey Show," "Bobby Jones Show," "Living the Dream", a television tribute to Dr. Martin Luther King, PBS special "Going Home to Gospel with Patti LaBelle", along with Gospel Queen Albertina Walker, and the "PTL Club". They appeared on TV Gospel Time and have been featured several times on the locally produced Emmy Award-winning "Jubilee Showcase". They have appeared on The Stellar Awards, which included accepting 2009 Walgreens' Ambassador Bobby Jones Legend Award.

The Barrett Sisters are featured in the Gaither Gospel Series videos "Rivers of Joy"(1998) and "Build A Bridge" (2004), which was filmed at The Potter's House in Dallas, Texas.

In 1982, the Barrett Sisters were featured in the critically acclaimed documentary "Say Amen, Somebody," which features Willie Mae Ford Smith, Sallie Martin, Thomas A. Dorsey, The O'Neal Twins, and Zella Jackson Price. New Yorker film critic Pauline Kael wrote that The Barrett Sisters "bring the film to an emotional pitch, and we in the audience want to go on soaring...." They were also featured on the soundtrack.

They are featured in the 2010 concert film "The Barrett Sisters in Concert", as well as the 2013 documentary, "The Sweet Sisters of Zion: Delois Barrett Campbell & The Barrett Sisters", both of which were produced and directed by Regina Rene.

== List of screening festivals for Sweet Sisters of Zion ==
- 2013 Chicago Blues Festival – World Premiere
- 2013 Chicago Gospel Fest
- 2014 CIMM Festival

== Members ==
=== DeLois Barrett Campbell ===
The eldest Barrett sister, DeLois Barrett Campbell (March 12, 1926 – August 2, 2011), began her career as the lead singer of the world-famous Roberta Martin Singers while still in high school in the 1940s. As a member of The Roberta Martin Singers, DeLois traveled around the United States and the world singing for the Lord, but she soon placed her career on hold to start her family. DeLois became a mother and a pastor's wife. She later returned to singing and continued until 2009, when medical problems deprived her of her singing voice.

=== Billie Barrett GreenBey and Rodessa Barrett Porter ===
Meanwhile, Billie Barrett GreenBey and Rodessa Barrett Porter became wives and mothers. Billie had become a soloist, and Rodessa had become a songwriter and choir director in Gary, Indiana.

Billie Barrett-GreenBey was born on August 28, 1928, and died on February 28, 2020.

Rodessa (December 15, 1930 – December 16, 2024) was the last living sister after the deaths of DeLois in 2011 and Billie in 2020. DeLois had her last annual birthday concert celebration at First Church of Deliverance in Chicago, that included performances with her sisters Billie and Rodessa. She had used a wheelchair for years, had battled arthritis and other health issues, and lost her voice in late 2009, but she was still present during some of the concerts with a microphone on her. Rodessa died on December 16, 2024, a day after her 94th birthday.

=== Tina Brown ===
Tina Brown met DeLois Barrett Campbell in 1999, the same year she formed her own group, Tina Brown Voices. When DeLois' health prevented her from performing, Tina was asked to stand in for her, and sing her parts in the group.

== See also ==
The Roberta Martin Singers

== Awards and accolades ==
- World's greatest female trio in gospel history
- American goodwill ambassadors during the 1980s
- "The Barrett Sisters" is engraved on the Stellar Awards
- Brought gospel music to nations on nearly every continent.

== Discography ==
=== Albums ===
Studio albums

- Jesus Loves Me (1963)
- I'll Fly Away (1965)
- Carry Me Back (1966)
- Coming Again So Soon (1973)
- God So Loved the World (1974)
- I've Got a Feeling (1987)
- Live! Nobody Does It Better (1990)
- What Will You Do with Your Life (1990)
- Peacemaker (1991)
- Through It All (1994)
- What Shall I Render (Unto God) (1995)
- Best of Delois Barrett Campbell and the Barrett Sisters (1995)
- Best Of... (1996)
- What a Wonderful World (1998)
- He's Got the Whole World in His Hands (2002)
- He's So Wonderful (2011)

Soundtracks

- Jesus Loves Me (1982)

=== Contributions to Compilations ===
- Precious Lord: Recordings of the Great Gospel Songs of Thomas A. Dorsey (1973)
- Live in Concert With... vol 2. (1977)
- Chicago Gospel Pioneers (1987)
- The Soul of Chicago (1993)
- The Best of the Roberta Martin Singers (2001)
- Living Gospel (2002)
- Gospel Pioneers 2 (2007)
