= Anthony Heilbut =

American biographer and record producer

- Born: November 22, 1940 (age 85); New York City, New York, U.S.
- Education: Harvard University (PhD in English)
- Occupations: Writer, record producer
- Years active: 1971–present
- Known for: The Gospel Sound: Good News and Bad Times; Thomas Mann: Eros and Literature
- Awards: Grammy Award; Grand Prix du Disque; ASCAP Deems Taylor Award; Randy Shilts Prize for Gay Non-Fiction

Anthony Heilbut (born November 22, 1940) is an American writer, and a Grammy Award winning record producer of gospel music. He is noted for his biography of Thomas Mann, and is also a two-time recipient of the Grand Prix du Disque.

== Life ==
Anthony Heilbut, the son of German Jewish refugees Bertha and Otto Heilbut, was born in New York. He received his Ph.D. in English from Harvard University when he was 25. For the next ten years he taught, first at New York University and then at Hunter College. Since 1976 he has been a full-time writer and record producer.

Heilbut’s first book, The Gospel Sound: Good News and Bad Times, was published in 1971 and has been updated several times since then; a “25th Anniversary Edition” appeared in 1997. James Baldwin called it “a very beautiful book, written with love and precision, no pity. I didn’t know anybody knew that much about it, or cared that much, or could be so tough and lucid.” It helped inspire Baldwin’s 1979 novel Just Above My Head, about a gospel singer.

Exiled in Paradise: German Refugee Artists and Intellectuals in America from the 1930s to the Present was published in 1983 and updated in 1997. Donna Rifkind, in a 2020 essay in The Wall Street Journal, chose it as one of the “five best books” on Hitler’s émigrés, as well as the “most immersive.”

Heilbut's Thomas Mann: Eros and Literature was published in 1996. The New York Times called the book "brilliant" and "astonishing". Colm Toibin in The London Review of Books called it "brilliantly perceptive", and The Independent called it "endlessly illuminating". In 1997, it received the Randy Shilts Award for Gay Non-Fiction from the Publishing Triangle.

He has written reviews and articles for, among others, Harper's Magazine, The New York Times Book Review, The Nation, Truthdig, The New Yorker, Dimensions, The Village Voice, The Daily Beast, The Believer, Los Angeles Times Book Review, Black Women in America, and The Encyclopedia of New York City.

Heilbut's The Fan Who Knew Too Much, a collection of cultural essays published by Alfred A. Knopf in 2012, ranges from Thomas Mann to the gay and lesbian influence on gospel music. The book won the Deems Taylor ASCAP Award, and was chosen by Lorin Stein, then editor of The Paris Review, as one of his seven recommended books of 2012. In a 2012 review in the Chicago Tribune, Eric Banks — Director of the New York Institute for the Humanities — wrote: “The intellectual command and all-over-the-place critical nimbleness on display are dazzling.” The book was released in paperback by Soft Skull Press in fall 2013.

He has appeared in several documentaries including Rejoice and Shout (2011) and Sister Rosetta Tharpe: The Godmother of Rock and Roll (2011).

== Producer ==
Anthony Heilbut is a record producer. He has produced anthologies of jazz, country music, white gospel and opera, but his specialty is Black gospel music. Among his productions, How I Got Over (Columbia) by Mahalia Jackson won both a Grammy Award and a Grand Prix du Disque; Prayer Changes Things (Atlantic) by Marion Williams won a Grand Prix du Disque; and Precious Lord: The Great Gospel Songs of Thomas A. Dorsey (Sony) was the first gospel album to be included in the Library of Congress’ National Recording Registry.

Heilbut has produced albums for many labels. Since 1987 he has been the president, sole producer, literary editor, and janitor of Spirit Feel Records, which is distributed by Shanachie Records.

Other gospel acts Heilbut has produced include The Dixie Hummingbirds, Professor Alex Bradford, Dorothy Love Coates, Bessie Griffin, Reverend Claude Jeter, R. H. Harris, Inez Andrews, The Roberta Martin Singers, Sallie Martin, J. Robert Bradley, Robert Anderson, Willie Mae Ford Smith, The Stars of Faith, and Delois Barrett Campbell.

He has also produced reissues and career overviews of Edna Gallmon Cooke, The Fairfield Four, and his friend Sister Rosetta Tharpe. In 2010, he produced a combination CD/DVD, How Sweet It Was: The Sights and Sounds of Traditional Gospel. In 2011, he annotated and co-produced the Aretha Franklin compilation The Great American Songbook.

Because his singers needed new material, Heilbut also wrote many songs for them, some of which received critical praise. Rita Dove, the first Black Poet Laureate of the United States, chose Marion Williams’ Strong Again — composed and produced by Heilbut — as one of her ten “Desert Island Disks.” And Bruce Springsteen included Williams’ Trouble So Hard — a rearrangement of the old spiritual with new, politically charged verses by Heilbut — among his favorite songs of all time and featured it on Volume 1 of his From My Home to Yours E Street Radio show on SiriusXM.

Heilbut is an atheist.

== Works ==
- The Gospel Sound: Good News and Bad Times (1971)
- Exiled in Paradise: German Refugee Artists and Intellectuals in America (1983)
- Thomas Mann: Eros and Literature (1995)
- The Fan Who Knew Too Much (2012)

== Awards ==
- ASCAP Deems Taylor Award (2013)
- Randy Shilts Prize for Gay Non-Fiction (1997)
- Grand Prix du Disque (producer of Mahalia Jackson’s How I Got Over) (1977)
- Grand Prix du Disque (producer of Marion Williams’ Prayer Changes Things) (1976)
- Grammy Award (producer of Mahalia Jackson’s How I Got Over) (1977)

== Movie Appearances ==
- The Legendary Marion Williams (2023)
- Elvis Presley: The Searcher (2018)
- Mavis! (2015)
- The Godmother of Rock & Roll: Sister Rosetta Tharpe (2011)
- Rejoice and Shout (2010)
