= Zella Jackson Price =

American gospel singer (born c. 1940)

Zella Jackson Price (born c. 1940) is an American gospel singer whose career has spanned 50 years. She performed with many St. Louis–based entertainers and earned national recognition, performing in her own show at Carnegie Hall in 1985. She was one of the pioneer black announcers on St. Louis radio and was the feature of a documentary about her life created by Chicago TV channel 28. She sang in several movies, including Say Amen, Somebody (1982), a documentary about Willie Mae Ford Smith's life, and the HBO mini-series Angels in America.

In 2015, Price made headlines when a daughter she had given birth to in 1965 and she believed to be dead made contact with her through social media. DNA evidence confirmed that Price was the mother of the woman. Price claims that a nurse told her that her baby had died while in the hospital. However, hospital records and other evidence suggest that the baby was abandoned by Price at a different hospital.

== Career ==
Price's music career began at the age of six, singing gospel music and playing piano accompaniment for her mother, Alberta (née Waterford) Cooper, who sang with the Waterford Sisters and Willie Mae Ford Smith. Price graduated from Sumner High School of St. Louis in 1957 and began her own career. By 1967, she had already made recordings and was touring Missouri singing gospel songs, having recorded with artists such as Oliver Sain Skeet Rogers, Denise Thimes and other artists.

Price was a pioneer of gospel radio, hosting a show on KIRL, and along with other black announcers including Columbus Gregory, Wynetta Lindsey, Steve Love, Leonard Morris, Dean Strong and Ruby Summerville-Dickson "played a significant role in the development of St. Louis black radio." She later starred in a television special on Chicago's TV channel 28, which documented her life and work.

Price was a featured singer in the music documentary Say Amen, Somebody. The 1982 documentary also features The Barrett Sisters, Thomas A. Dorsey, Willie Mae Ford Smith, Sallie Martin and The O'Neal Twins. Price sang an emotional rendition of her song "I'm His Child" in the film, which later appeared on the 1990 soundtrack album for Glee. Her performance was praised by Chicago Sun-Times, Cosmopolitan Magazine and Rolling Stone. She was selected to play Ethel Waters in a film of Waters' life, and she sang "I'm His Child", written by Malcolm Speed in the Emmy Award-winning HBO mini-series Angels in America, which starred Al Pacino and Meryl Streep.

Price's performed in 1985 at Carnegie Hall in New York City, with her long-time accompanist Michael Johnson. Another was a 2009 performance for Black History Month at Powell Hall with the Saint Louis Symphony to honor blues legend Mae Wheeler.

== Personal life ==
In April 2015, Price met her daughter, Melanie Diane Gilmore, for the first time as an adult, in the presence of mainstream news broadcasters. Gilmore made contact with Price after her daughters were searching for their biological grandparents online. DNA results have confirmed the relationship between Price and her daughter. Price claimed that she was told her daughter had died within three hours of birth in 1965.

Hospital records show that Price delivered the baby at a different hospital than she later claimed and that she abandoned her baby. Hospital records show that staff had tried to contact Price and even visited her and other family members on a number of occasions. The adoptive family that raised the baby also claims they reached out to Price years later and she denied having a daughter. U.S. Attorney Richard Callahan after an investigation found no evidence to support Price's claims. Despite the evidence, Price maintains her claim that a nurse told her that the baby was dead and that her baby was stolen.

== Discography ==
- Say Amen, Somebody (soundtrack, 1990)
