= Brother Joe May =

American gospel singer (1912–1972)

- Born: Joseph May; November 9, 1912; Macon, Mississippi, U.S.
- Died: July 14, 1972 (aged 59) Thomasville, Georgia
- Occupation: Singer
- Years active: c.1930–1972

Brother Joe May (November 9, 1912 – July 14, 1972) was an American gospel singer. He was sometimes billed as "The Thunderbolt of the Middle West", and has been described as "arguably the greatest male soloist in the history of gospel music.... [with] a voice of unimaginable range and power, moving from a whisper to a scream without the slightest suggestion of effort".

== Life ==
Born Joseph May in Macon, Mississippi, he was raised as a member of the Church of God denomination in which all males are referred to as "Brother". He sang with the Little Church Out on the Hills' senior choir and then the Church of God Quartet, building a reputation on the Southern gospel circuit. He worked as a laborer in Macon, before moving in 1941 with his wife Viola and their children to East St. Louis, Illinois, where he was employed in a chemical plant.

In St. Louis, he met and came under the influence of the singer Willie Mae Ford Smith, and adopted much of her phrasing and performing style. He began singing at Thomas A. Dorsey's National Conventions of Gospel Choirs and Choruses, directed by Smith, and after a performance in Los Angeles in 1949 was signed by talent scout J. W. Alexander to Specialty Records. His first record, "Search Me Lord", became a gospel hit, and was estimated to have sold over one million copies though without reaching any of the published record charts of the day. His follow-up record, "Do You Know Him?" in 1950, was equally successful, and May became a full-time musician, touring nationally with gospel groups such as the Soul Stirrers and the Pilgrim Travelers. He also sang duets with Willie Mae Ford Smith, and usually performed in a distinctive long white robe with a rope cross.

As one of the Specialty label's most successful artists, the company tried to persuade him to record more secular material, but May refused, although he acknowledged blues singer Bessie Smith as a major influence. His records often used an organ-dominated rhythm section as well as a full choir, and he was sometimes described as a male equivalent of Mahalia Jackson, with whom he sometimes performed. He was cited as a musical inspiration by Little Richard.

However, his success in the gospel field was not translated into crossover success in the white record market. He left Specialty in 1958, and began recording his own compositions for the Nashville-based Nashboro label. He also performed and made recordings with his daughter, Annette, and with singer Jackie Verdell. After returning to the South, May's popularity continued to grow in that region. In the early 1960s, he starred with Marion Williams in the musical Black Nativity in New York City, and toured the U.S. and Europe with the production.

He continued to perform widely in the Southern states despite health problems, and recorded a series of gospel albums for the Nashboro label through the 1960s and early 1970s. On his way to a performance in Thomasville, Georgia, he suffered a massive stroke, and died in 1972 at the age of 59.

In 2000, he was posthumously inducted into the International Gospel Music Hall of Fame in Detroit.

== Discography ==
=== Albums ===
- Walk On and Talk On (1962)
- Songs Of The Gospel (1964)
- My Own Fault (1966)
- That's Enough (1967)
- Best Of Brother Joe May (1967)
- I've Been Dipped In The Water (1968)
- Don't Let The Devil Ride (1969)
- Today (1970)
- Thank You Lord for One More Day (1970)
- In Church With Brother Joe May (1971)
- The Brother Joe May Story (2-LP Set)
- Search Me Lord (1974)
- In Loving Memory of Brother Joe May: A Collection of His Most Famous Recordings (1974)
