= Let Us Go Back to the Old Landmark =

Song
- Language: English
- Published: Philadelphia: Ward's House of Music, 1949
- Songwriter(s): W. Herbert Brewster

"Let Us Go Back to the Old Landmark", also known as "The Old Landmark", is a gospel song. Sometimes credited as "traditional", it was written by William Herbert Brewster, Sr. and published in 1949 in an arrangement by Virginia Davis. It was recorded by Brewster's own group, the Brewster Singers, and by many other gospel performers including Edna Gallmon Cooke, Clara Ward, Sister Rosetta Tharpe, and The Staple Singers. Later recordings were made by Aretha Franklin, Dionne Warwick, and Sweet Honey in the Rock. Some of the recordings credit the writing of the song to Adeline Brunner (as A.M. or A.H. Brunner). It is featured in the 1980 film The Blues Brothers, where it is performed by James Brown with the Rev. James Cleveland Choir. It also appears on the film's soundtrack album.
