= TV Gospel Time =

American gospel music television show

TV Gospel Time is an American Sunday morning television gospel music show that ran for three years on NBC network from 1962 to 1965. The show was based out of Chicago, with running time of 30 minutes. TV Gospel Time was the first television show designed to appeal to black audiences, according to Billboard Music Week October 20, 1962, when it launched in six television markets, New York, Washington DC, Augusta, Charleston, Columbus, and Baltimore. The number of cities carrying the show had grown to 20 by January 1963, and 50 markets by 1965. TV Gospel Time was the first television broadcast dedicated to gospel music airing one year before a similar gospel theme broadcast Jubilee Showcase started to air also from Chicago, on ABC network in 1963. TV Gospel Time was also the first TV broadcast of music performed exclusively by black musicians.

The show was produced in one of seven different cities for each episode featuring local talent from that region: Chicago, Cleveland, Jacksonville, Memphis, New York (Newark), Richmond, and Washington DC. The show pioneered the method of TV show crew, hosts and guests traveling to the location of the choir or orchestra, rather than flying the whole musical ensemble and their instruments to the broadcasting city to perform. In addition to the regularly featured choir, the TV audience got to see different black choirs from various cities each week - choirs they might not otherwise have been able to see. At that time travel for black Americans was difficult, with few hotels and restaurant options available to them. Perhaps the most remarkable note about Gospel Time was it was the very first all-black American TV show production. The hosts were black, as were the guests, audience, and the technical crew. Even the advertising that appeared during the weekly broadcasts featured only black personalities and models, which was the first time this happened on American television. When the advertising by Pharmaco Inc for TV Gospel Time reached a cumulative spend across its four brands exceeding one million dollars by 1964, it had become the largest spend of advertising to a targeted black audience demographic in US broadcasting history.

Sixty-six episodes were created, usually recording two episodes on one day in one city, featuring the same host but different supporting guests and a different local gospel choir for both episodes recorded on that day. Typically the guest artist would do two songs. While the theme of the music was religious, there was no preaching during TV Gospel Time, so it was a genuine music show, rather than a religious variety program with music. The hosts all sang during the episodes they hosted, usually with the visiting choir. The show was converted to and distributed on kinescope. Sixteen of those kinescopes are believed to have survived and content from those have been used to create the 2 DVD set. The program was directed by Peter Brysac and the musical director was the Reverend Alfred Miller of the Washington Temple Church Angelic Choir of Brooklyn. It was produced by Howard A Schwartz.

== Hosts and guests ==
=== Hosts ===
TV Gospel Time featured a rotating host system. The six hosts during the three-year run were: James Cleveland, Jesse 'JJ' Farley of the Soul Stirrers, Thomas Brown, Marie Knight, Archie Dennis (of The Roberta Martin Singers), and Georgia Louis. When it became Georgia Louis's turn to host TV Gospel Time for the first time in 1962, by hosting alone, she became first woman to host a televised program on American network TV. Up to that point all TV hosts had been men, or were mixed teams with male and female host. Future Rock n Roll Hall-of-Famer Sister Rosetta Tharpe was a guest host on two episodes. Betty Johnson hosted the 62nd episode that was recorded live and had artists like the Jewel Gospel Singers, the Gospel Baptist Church Youth Chorus & The Cedar Street Memorial Baptist Youth Chorus with Mr. Columbus Smith of Miami, Florida as the Soloist.

=== Guests ===
The show featured live gospel performances by famous gospel choirs and artists including Soul Stirrers, Clara Ward, the Five Blind Boys of Mississippi, Barrett Sisters, Ruth Brown, The Harmonizing Four, the Highway QCs, the Clark Sisters, the Thompson Community Singers, the Mighty Clouds of Joy, Roberta Martin, Carrie Smith, Royal Travelers, Voices of Shiloh, The Dixie Hummingbirds, Thelma Jones, James Lowe, The Tears of Music and The Caravans, O'Neal Twins, Cleophus Robinson, Drinkard Singers, Dorothy Love Coates & The Original Gospel Harmonettes, Ernestine Washington, Alex Bradford. The TV show was the world introduction of the harpsichord to accompany gospel music, as pioneered by Francis Cole. Many of the black artists had their first, and often even only TV appearances on TV Gospel Time. Making their TV debut included Dionne Warwick and Whitney Houston's mother, recording star Cissy Houston when they were in the gospel group the Drinkard Singers; as well as future rock n roll hall of famers Soul Stirrers and Ruth Brown.

=== Choirs ===
Each episode featured a gospel choir usually performing two songs. A total of 54 choirs performed during the 66 episodes, including Camp Meeting Gospel Choir, Cornerstone Baptist Southern California Community Choir, Olivet Institutional Baptist Church Choir, Pentecostal Temple Church of God in Christ Choir, Shiloh Christian Community Church Choir, St Mary's Church Choir, St Paul Disciple Choir, Voices of Shiloh, Washington Temple Angelic Choir and Washington Temple Celestial Chorus.

== Distribution ==
=== Viewership ===
On its Sunday morning time slot, for its target demographic, in cities where it was broadcast, TV Gospel Time achieved complete market dominance. Audience measurement by Pulse in 1965 reported that out of black households that had a TV receiver, 4 out of 5 such households had their television set turned on and tuned to TV Gospel Hour when the show was aired.

=== International ===
Broadcast to Europe by RAI of Italy, TV Gospel Time became first television program of American gospel music to be seen in Europe exposing American gospel artists to a large new market in 1963. With the exposure to the European market some TV Gospel Time performers achieved a larger success in Europe than in the US, notably Carrie Smith.

=== Video ===
A two DVD collection of selected musical performances was released in 2010 by the title of Soul of the Church (Hollywood Select Video/Infinity Entertainment Group, 2010). Most of the content on the DVD set is from TV Gospel Time, but the TV show's title is not mentioned on the cover of the DVD.
