= Can't Keep It to Myself =

Studio album by Marion Williams
- Released: 1993
- Genre: Gospel, blues
- Label: Shanachie
- Producer: Anthony Heilbut

Can't Keep It to Myself is an album by the American gospel singer Marion Williams, released in 1993. It was Williams's last album. A few months prior to the release of the album, Williams had become the first singer to win a MacArthur Award.

== Production ==
The album was produced by Anthony Heilbut. It contains a remake of one of Williams's earliest hit recordings, "Live the Life I Sing About in My Song".

== Critical reception ==
Professional ratings
Review scores
Source	Rating
AllMusic	4.5/5 stars
New York Daily News	4/5 stars
Pittsburgh Post-Gazette	4/4 stars

Ebony wrote that Williams's "spirited voice still gracefully skips down melodic mountains one soulful note at a time." Rolling Stone thought that "the hymns' structural solidity allows Williams to take flight: While she demonstrates throughout the clarity and discipline of a classical singer, she slurs and bends notes with the command of a soul performer." The Philadelphia Inquirer opined that the album "illustrates her ability to turn crawling, down-tempo gospel blues into a holy offering."

The Philadelphia Daily News concluded that, "without question Williams is the most rhythmic and bluesiest of all the old-school gospel divas—close your eyes and it's not much of a stretch to envision her in Bessie Smith's place, vampin' 'Gimme a Pigfoot' speak-easy style—which is why part of the joy of the album is in the mix." The Pittsburgh Post-Gazette called Can't Keep It to Myself "an excellent primer on Williams' art, and one of the single best albums of the year." The San Diego Union-Tribune wrote that Williams "unleashes that voice with sustained passion and pinpoint control, swooping and soaring with the fervor of a blues queen and the fluidity of a jazz diva."

AllMusic deemed the album "awesome performances recorded with minimal, sympathetic accompaniment and little production support; just mostly Williams' smashing, note-bending, soaring vocals."

== Track listing ==
No.	Title	Length
1.	"Got On My Traveling Shoes"
2.	"Ain't He Good"
3.	"God's Amazing Grace"
4.	"Come Out the Corner"
5.	"Leave You in the Hands of the Lord"
6.	"Ride in the Clouds"
7.	"Press On (Like the Bible Said)"
8.	"The New Gospel Train"
9.	"Nobody Knows the Trouble I've Seen"
10.	"I'll Never Return No More"
11.	"Hark the Voice"
12.	"Packin' Up"
13.	"Live the Life I Sing About in My Song"
14.	"I Heard the Voice"
15.	"I'm So Glad"
16.	"I Have a Friend"
17.	"O Lord Remember Me"
18.	"Were You There When They Crucified My Lord"
19.	"Loose the Man"
20.	"Lazarus"
21.	"Mary, Mary"
22.	"I Just Can't Keep It to Myself"
