= William Herbert Brewster Sr. =

American composer

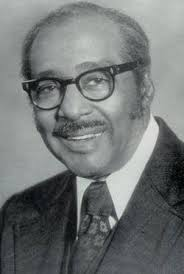
- Born: July 2, 1897; Somerville, Tennessee, U.S.
- Died: October 15, 1987 (aged 90); Memphis, Tennessee, U.S.
- Education: Roger Williams College
- Occupations: Baptist minister, composer, dramatist, singer, poet, community leader
- Years active: 1918–1987
- Organization: East Trigg Avenue Baptist Church

Dr. William Herbert Brewster, Sr. (July 2, 1897 – October 15, 1987) was a Baptist minister and an important composer of gospel music, as well as a poet, playwright, orator and civil rights leader.

== Early life ==
Brewster was born in Somerville, Tennessee. A 1922 graduate of Roger Williams College in Nashville, he settled in Memphis in the 1920s; he served as the pastor of the East Trigg Avenue Baptist Church in South Memphis from 1930 until his death in 1987.

== Gospel music compositions ==
His lasting fame, however, is through his musical compositions. Among his more than 200 published songs are the gospel standards "Move on Up a Little Higher" (Mahalia Jackson's first hit in 1948) and "Surely, God Is Able" (a 1950 hit for The Ward Singers). These songs hold the distinction of being the first million-selling black gospel records. Other Brewster songs that were hits included "Lord I've Tried" (The Soul Stirrers), "I'll Go" (Queen C. Anderson), "I'm Climbing Higher and Higher" (Marion Williams), and a favorite of African-American gospel choirs, "Let Us Go Back to the Old Landmark," among many others.

Though there are several available recordings of Rev. Brewster's gospel groups The Brewster Singers and The Brewsteraires, there are only two vocal recordings of Rev. Brewster himself. Both recordings credited to "Rev. W.H. Brewster And His Camp Meeting Of The Air" appeared on the Gotham single "Give Me That Old Time Religion"/"So Glad I've Got Good Religion". Each song features a narration by Rev. Brewster followed by vocals. A 45 RPM exists of two Brewster songs, "Farewell" and "Not One Word," being sung by members of the United Singing Union of Memphis, Tennessee.

== Musical dramas ==
Brewster was also the composer of more than 15 gospel music dramas, including From Auction Block to Glory (1941) which was the first nationally staged African American religious drama that featured gospel songs written specifically for the production. He was honored by the Smithsonian Institution in 1982 for his music when it presented his musical drama Sowing in Tears, Reaping in Joy.

== Influence on Elvis Presley ==
In addition to his vast legacy in the genre of black gospel music, Brewster had a formative influence on a young Elvis Presley, who occasionally attended services at East Trigg Avenue Baptist Church and listened to Brewster's sermons broadcast on Sunday nights on the "Camp Meeting of the Air" over Memphis radio station WHBQ. Dewey Phillips, radio host of WHBQ's Red, Hot and Blue often interviewed Dr. Brewster who invited all listeners "black and white, to Sunday night services at East Trigg." According to Presley biographer Peter Guralnick, "Dr. Brewster constantly preached on the theme that a better day was coming, one in which all men could walk as brothers, while across Memphis Sam Phillips listened on his radio every Sunday without fail."

== Death ==
Dr. Brewster died, aged 90, in Memphis, Tennessee, where he is buried in the New Park Cemetery.

== Legacy ==
In February 2007, the Memphis City Schools named a new school in the Binghampton community in Brewster's honor as the Dr. William Herbert Brewster Elementary School.
