= Say Amen, Somebody =

1982 documentary film

- Theatrical release poster
- Directed by: George Nierenberg
- Produced by: George T. Nierenberg; Karen Nierenberg
- Starring: Willie Mae Ford Smith; Thomas A. Dorsey; Delois Barrett Campbell and the Barrett Sisters; O'Neal Twins; Zella Jackson Price
- Cinematography: Ed Lachman; Don Lenzer
- Edited by: Paul Barnes
- Production company: GTN Production
- Distributed by: United Artists Classics
- Release date: October 5, 1982
- Running time: 100 minutes
- Country: United States
- Budget: $350,000
- Box office: $1,108,299

Say Amen, Somebody is a 1982 American documentary film directed by George Nierenberg about the history and significance of gospel music as told through the lives and trials of its singers. Included are Thomas A. Dorsey, considered the "Father of Gospel Music", and "Mother" Willie Mae Ford Smith, an associate of Dorsey's who trained gospel singers for decades. Ford and three singing acts – Delois Barrett Campbell and the Barrett Sisters, Zella Jackson Price, and the O'Neal Twins, Edgar and Edward, backed by a choir – provide music throughout.

After its debut at the New York Film Festival to a sold out audience, Say Amen, Somebody saw a limited release in major cities. It received widespread critical acclaim with reviewers focusing especially on the strong personalities within gospel and the joyful music. It was restored in 2019 and was shown at limited theaters, again receiving positive reviews.

In 2025, the film was selected for preservation in the United States National Film Registry by the Library of Congress for being "culturally, historically or aesthetically significant."

== Summary ==
Say Amen, Somebody gives an overview of the history of gospel music in the U.S. by following two main figures: Thomas A. Dorsey, considered the "Father of Gospel Music," 83 at the time of filming, recalls how he came to write his most famous song, "Take My Hand, Precious Lord" (1932), and the difficulty he faced introducing gospel blues to black churches in the early 1930s. "Mother" Willie Mae Ford Smith, 77 years old and an associate of Dorsey's, is the film's primary subject. Smith was closely involved with the organization Dorsey co-founded, the National Convention of Gospel Choirs and Choruses (NCGCC), becoming the director of the Soloists' Bureau in 1939. In this position, she trained several very influential 20th century gospel singers though remained relatively unknown herself outside of gospel.

Delois Barrett Campbell, and Zella Jackson Price are shown confronting the sacrifices they have made to put gospel music in the fore of their lives and the lives of their families, and the O'Neal Twins, Edward and Edgar, discuss the difficulties in trying to make a living exclusively in gospel music. The film features informal moments of subjects singing in private places, such as Dorsey in his back yard and Smith at her kitchen table, and two music recitals, one at an NCGCC meeting in Houston (1981), and a tribute concert for Willie Mae Ford Smith in St. Louis that Nierenberg organized.

== Development ==
As a 28-year-old Jewish filmmaker, George Nierenberg had no experience with gospel music before taking on the project. He had recently finished No Maps on My Taps (1979), a documentary following three New York City-based tap dancers. Seeking ideas for a new project, he asked blues guitarist and friend Ry Cooder for suggestions: "These were his exact words – he said, 'You oughta look into gospel music; those cats are really neat.' "

Nierenberg went looking for performers "whose expression was an extension of themselves", people committed to an art form without, he felt, proper recognition. He decided on the project when he learned no documentary about gospel music had ever been made. He believed this, and his inexperience with the topic, allowed him to bring a "fresh point of view" to the film, saying, "One of my goals was to dispel the mystique of the gospel experience, which people have all kinds of misconceptions about... or don't know what to think of."

For background work, Nierenberg interviewed hundreds of figures in gospel music, including James Cleveland, the Hawkins Family – also known as the Edwin Hawkins Singers who released the international number 1 hit, "Oh Happy Day" in 1969, Rebert Harris of the Soul Stirrers, and Claude Jeter, an original member of the Swan Silvertones. After learning about Dorsey, Smith, and their contributions to gospel music, Nierenberg settled on them as the central focus of the film, later admitting that had he not found them, the film probably would not have been made. They were, in his opinion, extraordinary people whose stories should be told. He met with them, then visited Smith in her St. Louis home and Campbell in hers. With the background research done, Nierenberg felt that half of his pre-production work was behind him. To put all the participants at ease during filming, he spent a year in churches, becoming familiar with choirs and singers, music, and church culture. Cinematographer Edward Lachman recognized the importance of developing relationships with the subjects, as "they knew us as people so they could react freely" in front of the cameras. (Note: Smith insisted that Zella Jackson Price and her grandson Keith be in the film. (See: "The Making of Say Amen, Somebody, Now Gloriously Restored" in Citations.)

The title of the film references typical moments in black churches when a preacher will say a phrase or scripture, and met without any response – especially if the congregation does not agree – will prompt them by saying, "Say 'Amen', somebody." Dorsey does this in the film when he remembers that gospel blues, denigrated in black churches before 1932 for being sinful and degrading, is in actuality the "good news" of Christ's salvation, eliciting support and agreement from his audience.

== Production and filming ==
Nierenberg does not use a narrator in the film to explain details to the audience. Instead, stories are told through memories shared on camera, vintage film footage and still shots, and more intimate scenes Nierenberg set up between performances. He employs a personalized method of documentary filmmaking, using subjects the way a scripted movie uses characters. Contrary to a purist view of making documentaries where the filmmaker only observes without interfering with the subject, explaining that "it's my role to find the story", Nierenberg prompted scenes to play out between the subjects and during editing did his best not to misrepresent the people and the situations they were in. All the cinematographers had to do was film. For example, a scene where Delois Barrett Campbell and her husband are having a discussion in their kitchen about her touring Europe with her sisters was instigated by Nierenberg, who already knew this was a point of contention between them. Campbell and her sisters formed a gospel trio in 1963. Touring Europe with them had been a dream of Delois' for many years. Her husband, Reverend Frank Campbell, says that he wishes she would be more involved in his ministry and not go. She looks at the camera, then asks him if he wanted eggs with his sausage without any further response. Though the exchange was real, when Nierenberg arrived for filming that day, the Campbells had already eaten. He asked Delois to make breakfast again and while she did, he leaned towards Frank's ear and prompted him to ask Delois a question. Nierenberg did not know the moment would be so tense. When Delois looks at the camera, she is actually looking at Nierenberg, behind the camera, in consternation. Conversely, the scene in which Smith's grandson tells her that he thinks women should not be ministers was a complete surprise to everyone, including Smith, who was ordained in the 1940s. (Note: The film brought Campbell and her sisters enough renown that they were able to tour Europe twice in 1983: once for a month through Germany, France, and Switzerland, and a week in Spain. (Rodgers, Gaby, "A Songful Herald and Her Soulful Gospel", Newsday (March 20, 1983), p. B7.))

During filming, Nierenberg recalls a litany of mechanical problems with cameras, lighting, and sound equipment, remembering it as "a disaster". Much of the time dedicated to technical aspects of filming was spent setting up lighting, which, according to J. Greg Evans in American Cinematographer, acts as support for the narrative structure of the film. Whenever possible, natural lighting was used, but when more was needed, what the cinematographers added was as close to natural light as possible. While this took some time to accomplish – for instance, setting the lights for the performances at the NCGCC meeting took three days – it helped to enhance the realism in the film and put the subjects at ease. Evans writes that because of the lighting, the cinematographers were able to capture "some of the most brilliant colors ever in a documentary".

Nierenberg furthermore insisted that each of the three cameras had a sound man and an assistant during musical performances to capture ambient sounds and conversations so nothing would be missed. While filming the performers, Nierenberg sat above the crew, directing each camera assistant to capture what he wanted. He also made sure the film had 24-track sound, so each singer can be heard clearly with the supporting shouts and calls from the audience. In addition to organizing the tribute concert for Willie Mae Ford Smith, which he did purposefully to bring all the subjects together to watch them interact as they perform, Nierenberg picked each singing act's repertoire. Each musical number was rehearsed with the performers, camera, and sound crews before filming. With so many lights on the performers, Nierenberg wanted to make sure the shadows of all the crew members would not appear in the final edit so they would not detract from the performances. Because he organized so far in advance, filming for Say Amen, Somebody took only 15 days, something Evans considers "quite remarkable for a film of this nature and magnitude".

Looking back, cinematographer Don Lenzer viewed the filming sessions as a unique experience in his career. Going into the project, he was unsure Nierenberg's strategy of setting up scenes would bring results that would be both realistic and interesting to watch. He remarked that capturing the performances was as powerful as they are to see on film, bringing about an ecstasy of being "in the moment". For Lenzer, the joyous outcomes "defy explanation", and he recalled that "everything about the filming was extraordinary".

Dorsey began to show signs of Alzheimer's disease in the late 1970s. His involvement in the film was limited to periods when he was able to participate. His attendance at the NCGCC conference in the film was his last. He stopped speaking almost entirely two years after filming, and died in 1993. Willie Mae Ford Smith died the next year.

"Say Amen, Somebody" was funded by the National Endowment for the Humanities, National Endowment for the Arts, and the Missouri Arts Council. It debuted at the New York Film Festival on October 5, 1982 to a sold out audience, and opened in limited theaters in major cities on March 11, 1983.

== Restoration ==
In 2019, Nierenberg supervised the restoration of the film, an effort funded by the Center for African American Media Arts, the Academy of Motion Picture Arts and Sciences Academy Film Archive, the Smithsonian National Museum of African American History and Culture, Milestone Films, and the Robert F. Smith Fund. Rhea Combs of the Smithsonian commented that Nierenberg understood "the dynamics at play [in gospel music and churches] and he has a sensitivity to the story and the people – truly to the people – and respects them. And I think that that respect is then reflected in the way in which the film is produced and directed." She also remarked that much of the film's value lies in "passing the torch" from the older generation of singers to the new.

Originally, Say Amen, Somebody was filmed in standard 4:3 aspect ratio. When restored, the aspect ratio became 16:9, making the visuals cleaner and brighter, and easier to see on televisions. The audio was also enhanced to Dolby surround sound 5.1. The restored version of Say Amen, Somebody debuted at Lincoln Center on September 6, 2019. Nierenberg told National Public Radio that the restoration looked "like a new film completely", and he is especially proud that "it will carry forward gospel music and allow people for generations to experience this music." He furthermore stated that he continues to receive comments from black Americans who have seen the film multiple times, and he is taken aback when they express how much it means to them. At the time of the film's release, he was unaware of its significance, and had no idea of its "true meaning".

== Music ==
Say Amen, Somebody: Original Soundtrack Recording and More

Soundtrack album by Various Artists
- Released: March 11, 1983
- Genre: Soundtrack
- Length: 1:18:00
- Label: DRG Records
- Producer: Hugh Fordin

The soundtrack was initially issued as a double LP album containing twenty tracks, five of which were cut from the film. It was sold at theaters during original showings in 1982 and 1983. A second fifteen-track album was released in 1990.

Title
No.	Title	Performer	Length
1.	"Highway to Heaven"	The O'Neal Twins and the Interfaith Choir	3:48
2.	"Singing In My Soul"	Willie Mae Ford Smith	2:24
3.	"What Manner of Man"	Willie Mae Ford Smith	6:24
4.	"When I've Done My Best"	Thomas A. Dorsey	2:29
5.	"Take My Hand, Precious Lord"	Mahalia Jackson	2:21
6.	"If You See My Savior" (Edited out of the film)	Thomas A. Dorsey and Sallie Martin	3:44
7.	"I'm His Child"	Zella Jackson Price	3:44
8.	"I'd Trade A Lifetime" (Edited out of the film)	The O'Neal Twins	2:22
9.	"We Are Blessed" (Edited out of the film)	Delois Barrett Campbell and the Barrett Sisters (Rodessa Barrett-Porter and Billie Barrett-Greenbey)	2:31
10.	"Say A Little Prayer For Me" (Edited out of the film)	Zella Jackson Price	3:38
11.	"He Chose Me"	The O'Neal Twins	4:40
12.	"No Ways Tired"	Delois Barrett Campbell and the Barrett Sisters	5:24
13.	"Jesus Dropped the Charges"	The O'Neal Twins and the Interfaith Choir	4:26
14.	"I'll Never Turn Back"	Willie Mae Ford Smith	4:27
15.	"The Storm Is Passing Over"	Delois Barrett Campbell and the Barrett Sisters	4:33
16.	"It's Gonna Rain"	The O'Neal Twins	4:43
17.	"He Brought Us"	Delois Barrett Campbell and the Barrett Sisters	6:15
18.	"Take My Hand, Precious Lord"	Thomas A. Dorsey	5:10
19.	"Medley: God Is Love / Walkin' and Talkin' With Jesus" (Edited out of the film)	Gospel Unlimited of the Antioch Baptist Church	5:19
20.	"Canaan"	Willie Mae Ford Smith	10:20
Total length:			1:18:00

== Reception ==
Say Amen, Somebody earned widespread critical acclaim both in 1982 and following its restoration in 2019. Reviewers foremost expressed appreciation for the music, and they noted the repeated themes in the film: sexism within gospel, the passing of traditions from the older generation to the younger, and the sacrifices musicians must make forsaking commercial success for devotion to God. It has a 92% fresh rating on Rotten Tomatoes from twelve reviews. Rolling Stone, People, Time, and Gene Siskel and Roger Ebert on At the Movies named it one of the best films of 1983, and New York placed it at number 31 on their list of the 50 Best Documentaries of All Time in 2019.

Ebert gave the film four stars out of four, writing, "Say Amen, Somebody" is the most joyful movie I've seen in a very long time. It is also one of the best musicals and one of the most interesting documentaries", going further to call the film "a masterpiece of research, diligence and direction". Richard Schickel in Time called Say Amen, Somebody "marvelously infectious", writing that he enjoyed the personalities of the subjects: Dorsey's zeal and showmanship despite his age and frailty, and Campbell's quiet aspirations in contrast to her husband's desire for her to stay home. He states, "The film is shrewd in its selection of these moments. There are just enough of them to ground in a recognizable reality what could have been merely a well-shot and -edited compilation of irresistible music. But they are never so many that they interfere with the film's soaring flights of song."

In The New York Times, Janet Maslin, like all other critics, praised the music specifically, calling it "joyful, communal, and deeply moving". Nearly forty years later, Wesley Morris in the same publication wrote about the film's restoration, calling it "mighty yet somehow modest", explaining, "the lasting power of the movie might be as a rare document of gospel skill and strategy".

Likewise, Richard Harrington writing in The Washington Post enjoyed the intimacy of the cinematography. He calls it the "brightest, funniest, most joyful – and certainly the most inspirational film you're likely to come across in a long time... if you can resist it it's time to get your pulse checked." He observes that Willie Mae Ford Smith does not sing for appearances; she sings because she believes. Noting that the film was financed by public funds, Harrington says, "never have tax dollars been better spent" and that it has "enough warmth to melt an iceberg". In the Los Angeles Times, Sheila Benson calls it "joyful right down to your shoestrings" and "absolutely infectious". Regarding Thomas Dorsey's frailty, George Nierenberg "succeeds in involving us so completely that the question of whether Dorsey can summon the will to make it to the gospel convention, in which he has participated since 1933, becomes a true cliffhanger and Dorsey's appearance has the meaning for us that it has for the convention members. That is superb filmmaking." Similarly, Alex Keneas of Newsday called it "infectiously joyous", but gave it two and a half stars out of three because it "rambles". In the Boston Globe, Steve Morse comments that Say Amen, Somebody "is not just a film of historical impact. It is a film about human courage – the faith to follow one's inspiration no matter what the cost."

A second round of reviews came out in 2019. Slant Magazine gave the restoration three and a half stars out of four, calling it a "boisterous, often extraordinary film". Reviewer Chuck Bowen took away half a star for his observation that the film seems to neglect addressing racism as a primary cause of the cathartic power behind gospel music. Michael Giltz in Book and Film Globe, writes, "Ken Burns would need sixteen hours to scratch the surface of the complex and riveting history of gospel music. But in 100 minutes of Say Amen Somebody, director Nierenberg gives a sense of the music's history, the major figures, the flaws (like the sexism of the churches) and sees a resurgence up ahead." Giltz praises cinematographers Don Lenzer and Edward Lachman in particular.

John DeFore of the Hollywood Reporter writes that Say Amen, Somebody is "a joy-filled portrait with a healthy appetite for performance footage" and "a must for serious gospel fans, it also holds unexpected value for those interested in how attitudes have changed (or haven't) about women with careers outside the home." And Mark Labowskie of PopMatters says, "Even if you don't literally 'believe', you want to believe in the social possibilities this [film] represents.

Say Amen, Somebody has been discussed in academic journals as well: Deborah Smith Pollard in the Journal of the Society for American Music writes, "Moving visuals such as these are noteworthy, opening up entry points for those who teach African American culture to highlight the multiplicity of ways in which individuals respond to worship services, sacred music programs, or films as riveting as Say Amen, Somebody." Reviewing the restoration, Pollard specifically states that the audio "both spoken and sung, is absolutely worth the enrichment because of the informational and emotional power of what is delivered in every frame. In Ethnomusicology, Terrence Grimes praises "the overt humanness captured in the dialogue of the film's subjects", saying that it "gives viewers an ardent feeling, force, and joy that is contagious".
