= Lucy Smith Collier =

American gospel singer (1925-2010)

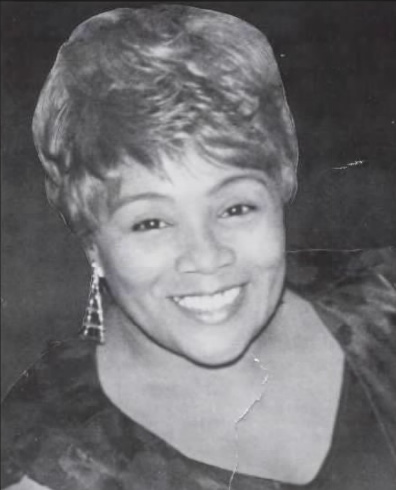

Background information
- Born: March 16, 1925; Chicago, Illinois, U.S.
- Died: September 19, 2010 (aged 85) Chicago, Illinois, U.S.
- Genres: Gospel
- Instruments: Piano, organ

Lucy Smith Collier (March 16, 1925 − September 19, 2010), also known as "Little Lucy," was an American gospel singer, pianist, organist, and composer. She led the female gospel group, The Little Lucy Smith Singers, and was a vocalist and accompanist for the Roberta Martin Singers. The granddaughter of Holiness preacher Elder Lucy Smith, she began playing organ at the All Nations Pentecostal Church at age twelve. Among her more well-known compositions are "Oh My Lord, What a Time", "What a Blessing in Jesus," and "He's my Light," which became a hit for the Roberta Martin Singers.

== Early years ==
Smith was born in Chicago on March 16, 1925. Her mother, Viola (Smith) Austin, died in 1927, and thereafter, Lucy was raised by her father, James Eugene Austin, and her maternal grandmother, Elder Lucy Smith, a Holiness Pentecostal minister. To distinguish her from her grandmother, she was called "Little Lucy Smith" as a child, a nickname that she would continue to use during her gospel career.

Smith showed an aptitude for music at an early age, and when she was ten years old, her grandmother sent her to study piano with Roberta Martin, a gospel performer. In two years she had become a skilled gospel accompanist, and at the request of her grandmother, she began playing the organ at her church and directing the music program. Elder Smith, a highly successful preacher and healer, had founded the All Nations Pentecostal Church, the first church ever established in Chicago by a woman pastor. Smith's skill as an organist helped draw more worshipers to the already popular church. In 1933, the church began broadcasting its worship services on the radio through their "Glorious Church of the Air" program, becoming one of the first black churches to broadcast its services. Through the radio program, Smith's music was heard by people far beyond the Chicago area.

== Recording career ==
In 1948, Smith published her first original gospel song, “What a Blessing in Jesus I’ve Found."

In her teens, she formed the Lucy Smith Trio, which later became the Little Lucy Smith Singers. She was joined by Catherine Campbell, Gladys Beamon Gregory and Sarah McKissick Simmons. By the mid-1950s, they had gained a significant following; their version of "Somebody Bigger Than You and I" was one of their most popular recordings. They also recorded “Come Unto Me,” “Jesus, Lover of My Soul” and “Down on My Knees.”

In the late 1950s, Smith joined the Roberta Martin Singers. She arranged much of their music, in addition to singing and playing piano and organ. Her organ playing was very popular and in 1962, she released a solo record of gospel tunes, entitled "Little Lucy Smith at the Organ." Smith suffered a stroke in her 50s, which ended her professional career as an accompanist, but continued to sing after her stroke.

In 1981, the Smithsonian Institution held a ceremony to honor the Roberta Martin Singers, and many of her gospel songs were acquired by the Smithsonian.

== Death and legacy ==
Smith died on September 19, 2010, at the age of 85. In her obituary, gospel music producer Anthony Heilbut is quoted as saying, "She is one of the most influential gospel pianists who ever played." James Cleveland and Richard Smallwood, among others, were influenced by her style of playing. Her music is featured on several compilations of music, including "The Great Gospel Women," published in 1993 by Shanachie Records.

== See also ==
- Gospel Music
- The Roberta Martin Singers
