= Lynn Rogoff =

American dramatist

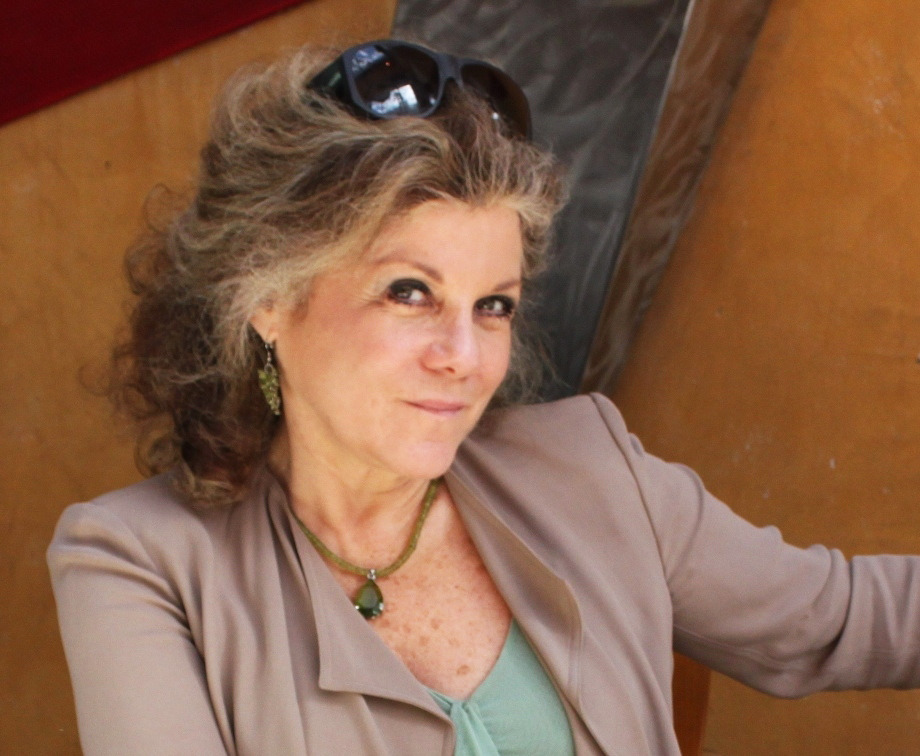
- Born: New York City
- Education: Master of Fine Arts
- Alma mater: New York University Tisch School of the Arts
- Occupations: Film and television producer

Lynn Rogoff is an American film and television producer, playwright, screenwriter, theatre director, and academic. She is best known for writing the 1979 Emmy Award winning documentary film No Maps on My Taps and the 1983 play Love, Ben Love, Emma; the latter of which examines the correspondence between Emma Goldman and Ben Reitman. She is an adjunct associate professor at the New York Institute of Technology.

== Early life and education ==
Born in New York City, Rogoff is the daughter of the veterinarian, George Rogoff, past president of the Bronx Veterinary Society and founder of the Veterinary Medical Association of New York City Journal. She is a graduate of New York University Tisch School of the Arts with an MFA in directing. In 1979, she was one of eight individuals accepted into the Astoria Motion Picture and Television Center Foundation's internship program. In 1980 she became a fellow in the Writers Guild of America, East's Screen and Television Writing Fellowship program which was funded by the National Endowment for the Arts.

== Career ==
Rogoff was nominated by the Writers Guild of America for writing the 1979 documentary film No Maps on My Taps. No Maps on My Taps was produced on grants from the AFI, PBS, the CPB, the Ford Foundation and the NEA. The film focuses on three black tap dancers who had fallen on hard times but had started dancing again. No Maps on My Taps won an Emmy Award for Outstanding Musical Direction in News and Documentary. In 2017 the film was restored and featured at Tap City, the American Tap Dance Foundation's annual festival.

Rogoff assisted producer Rupert Hitzig on the film Wolfen (1981). In 1983 she was selected to be the United States' representative to the United Nations's women's series project. This included a conference held jointly between the U.N. and the New York chapter of the American Association of Women in Radio and Television.

Rogoff penned the play Love, Ben Love, Emma which is based on correspondence between Emma Goldman and Ben Reitman. The play was originally produced by Lucille Lortel at the White Barn Theatre in Westport, Connecticut in 1983, starring Kevin O'Connor, Penelope Allen, and Martha Greenhouse. In 2020, Love, Ben Love, Emma had its Chicago premiere, produced by the Wayward Sister's Theatre Company.

Rogoff's television work includes Sesame Street, and Big Blue Marble. She wrote Freedom Fighters: Freedom and Justice for African Americans.

In 2019, Rogoff's company wrote and produced Bird Woman, a magical realism audio drama series based on the life of Sacagawea, the Shoshone woman associated with the Lewis and Clark Expedition. The series featured Sera-Lys McArthur and Daniel TwoFeathers.

In 2024, Rogoff adapted the project into Bird Woman, Sacajawea, a 54-minute animated historical dramatization that used artificial intelligence-assisted animation. Coverage in technology and education publications discussed Rogoff's use of AI-generated historical characters and related chatbot tools in connection with the project. InformationWeek described Rogoff's use of artificial intelligence in animation and individualized learning, while EdSurge discussed Bird Woman, Sacajawea in the context of educational uses of AI-generated historical figures and concerns about ethics and authenticity. The film received a Bronze Remi Award at the 2024 WorldFest-Houston International Film Festival in the Long Shorts – Historical category.

As a stage director, she has directed The Labyrinth by Fernando Arrabal (1973, NYU), A Streetcar Named Desire by Tennessee Williams (1974, The Atlas Room at NYU), Attempted Rescue On Avenue B by Megan Terry (1975, Cubiculo Theatre), and The In-Crowd, a rock opera by J. E. Franklin (1977, Henry Street Settlement).

Rogoff penned the narrative for the multimedia game Pony Express Rider; a product which was showcased at the Electric Entertainment Expo (E3) in 1996. That same year she advocated for writing for interactive media at the 1996 Show Biz Expo on behalf of the Writers Guild of America.

Rogoff serves as an adjunct associate professor at the New York Institute of Technology (NYIT) where she received the Presidential Excellence Award in New York City. In 2013, she received a research award from the NYIT to develop her GreenKids Media Endanger series at the university.
