= Pilgrim Baptist Church =

Historic church in Chicago, Illinois

- Kehilath Anshe Ma'ariv Synagogue
- U.S. National Register of Historic Places
- Chicago Landmark
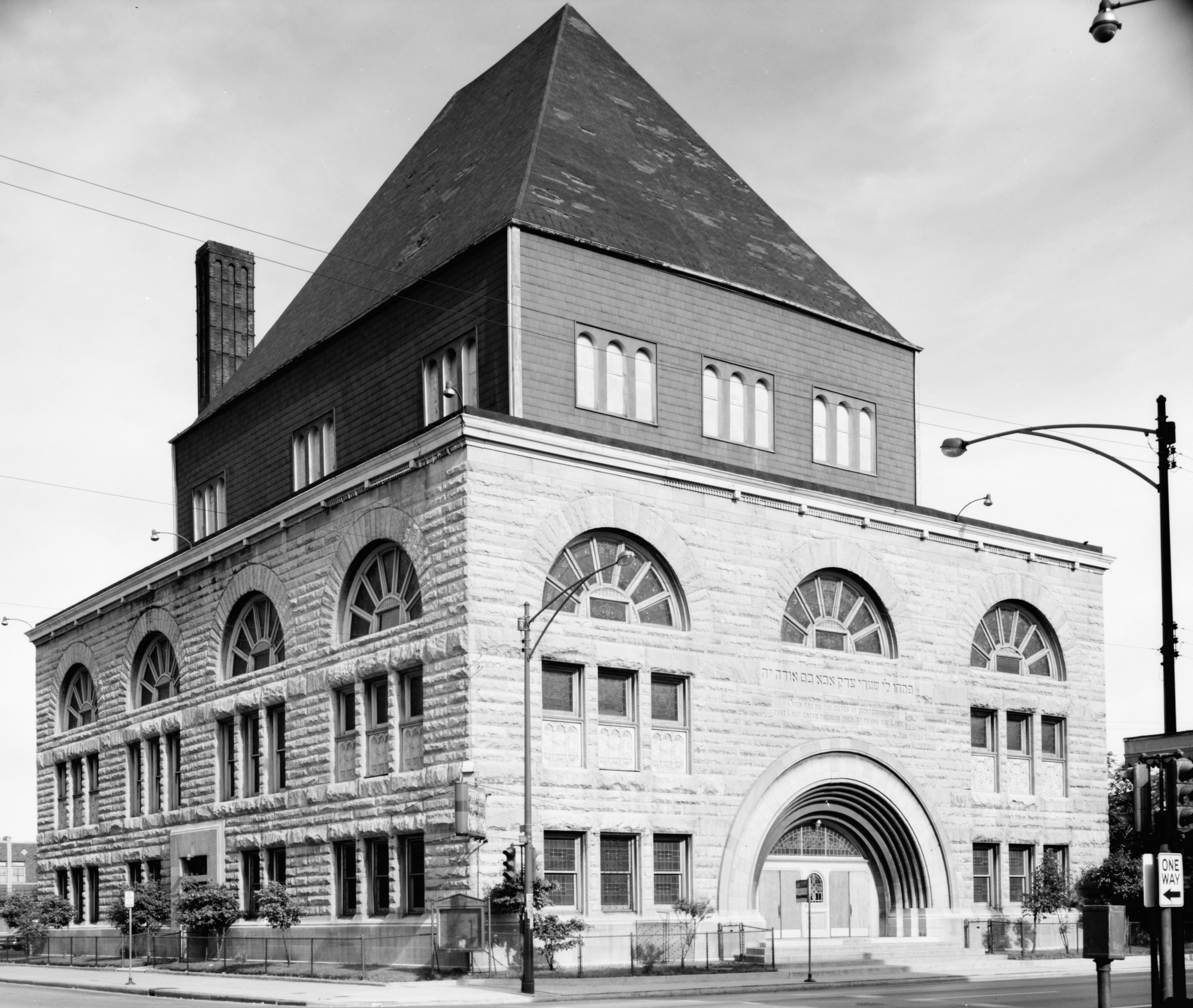
- Pilgrim Baptist Church, June 1964.
- Location: Chicago, Illinois
- Coordinates: 41°50′04″N 87°37′17″W
- Built: 1890
- Architect: Adler & Sullivan
- Architectural style: Chicago
- NRHP reference No.: 73000696

Significant dates
- Added to NRHP: April 26, 1973
- Designated CHICL: December 18, 1981

Pilgrim Baptist Church is a historic church at 3301 South Indiana Avenue in the Bronzeville neighborhood on the South Side of Chicago, Illinois, United States. The building, a Chicago Landmark and National Register of Historic Places site, was originally constructed for a synagogue, Kehilath Anshe Ma'arav. The church is notable both as an architectural landmark and for the cultural contributions by the congregation of the church. In 2017, the church was sold to the National Museum of Gospel Music.

== History ==
The building was designed as a synagogue by Chicago architects Louis Sullivan and Dankmar Adler, and built in 1890 and 1891. Originally, the structure was the home of Kehilath Anshe Ma'ariv, an important congregation in the development of Reform Judaism; Adler was a member, and his father was a rabbi. That congregation exists today as K.A.M. Isaiah Israel Temple.

A Baptist congregation moved into the building in 1922, forming Pilgrim Baptist Church.

The church is credited as the birthplace of gospel music in the 1930s. Thomas A. Dorsey, the "Father of Gospel Music", was the music director at Pilgrim Baptist for decades. Albertina Walker, Mahalia Jackson, Aretha Franklin, Sallie Martin, James Cleveland, The Staples Singers, and The Edwin Hawkins Singers are among those who have sung at the church.

Famous members of the congregation include Bessie Coleman. The church also hosted the funeral service of boxer Jack Johnson in 1946, and was prominent in the Civil Rights Movement. Martin Luther King Jr. delivered sermons at the church during the height of the movement.

In 1973, the building was listed on the National Register of Historic Places, and the building was designated a Chicago Landmark in 1981. It housed a large series of murals painted by the African-American painter William E. Scott between 1936 and 1937. Pilgrim's charismatic and forward-thinking pastor Junius C. Austin hired both Scott and Dorsey in the 1930s to increase the church's appeal, making it one of the largest churches in the country in just a few years.

=== Fire ===
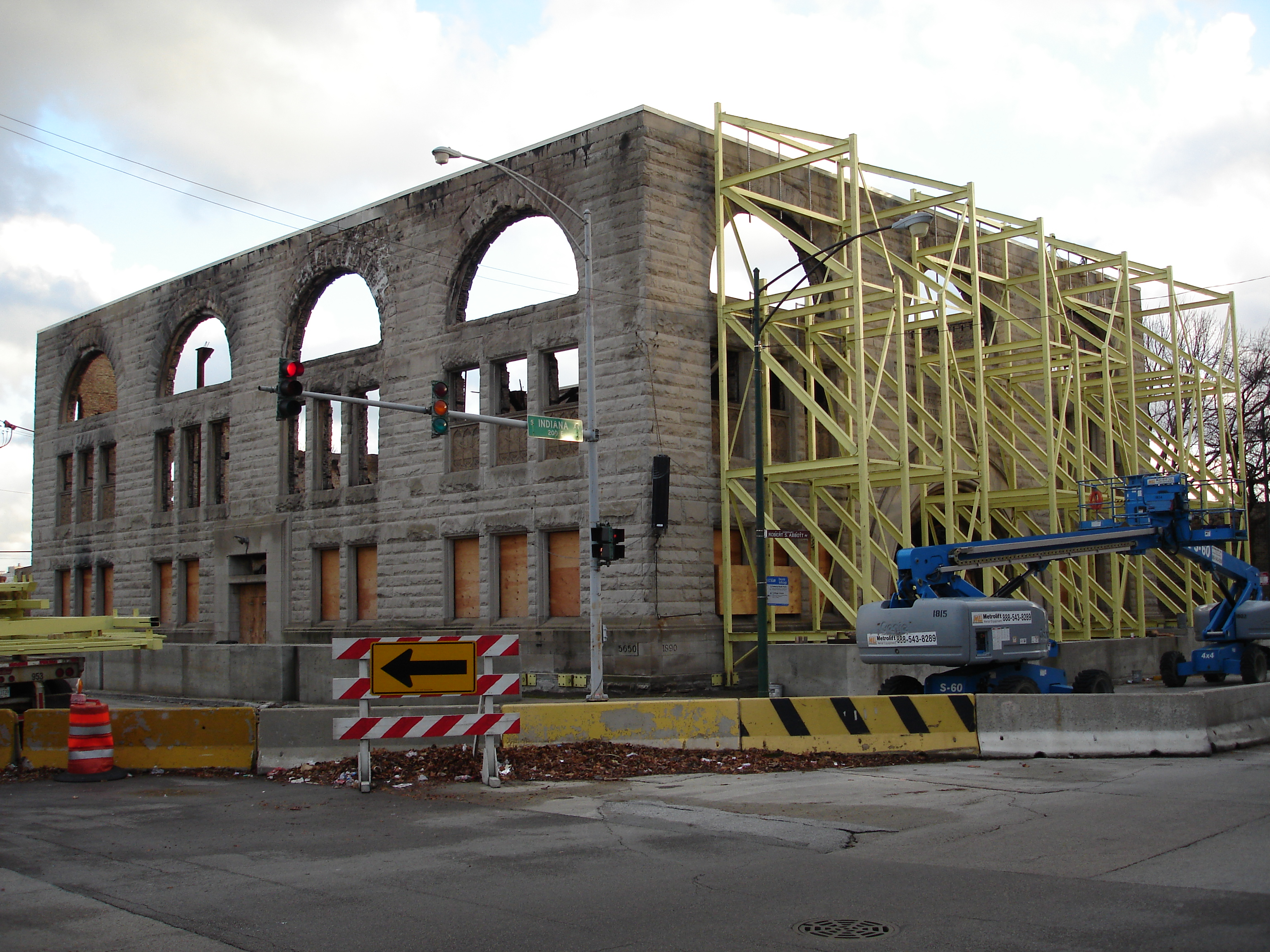
December 22, 2006

On January 6, 2006, a fire broke out that spread and gutted the building. Investigators concluded that the fire was started accidentally by workers performing roof repairs during a $500,000 restoration. The roofers were fitting metal coping, which is sealed with a blowtorch. Consumed in the fire were decades of historical records, along with boxes full of Dorsey's original sheet music. An elementary school across the street had to be evacuated, and the nearby Illinois College of Optometry building had windows destroyed by the high temperatures of the fire. Cars parked alongside the church were "virtually incinerated."

After the fire, the brick and stone of the outer walls still stood near-complete and were determined to be structurally sound. A steel support skeleton was later attached to the outside to brace the walls for a possible later reconstruction of the interior of the building and restoration of the façade.

The congregation now meets in a building across the street from the burnt out structure.

=== Reconstruction plans ===
Following the devastating fire that destroyed all but the exterior masonry walls of Pilgrim Baptist Church, the congregation committed to reconstructing the church on the current site. Sufficient documentation exists to ensure an accurate reproduction of the church, allowing for necessary alterations related to current liturgical and code requirements.

The target period for reconstruction of Pilgrim Baptist is the 1920s–1930s era. This period was chosen because it was during this time that, as Pilgrim Baptist Church, the most significant events associated with the building, including the rise of gospel music, occurred. At the same time, the building itself retained most of the physical elements that characterized its original design as a synagogue by Adler & Sullivan.

The exterior of the structure will be reconstructed to include all of the character-defining features of its original construction, which survived into the 1920s. At the interior, the sanctuary will be reconstructed to include all of the character-defining features of its original construction, with necessary modifications to accommodate modern accessibility and church usage requirements.

In 2017, the Pilgrim Baptist Church was sold to the National Museum of Gospel Music. Afterward, a $40 million fundraising effort commenced for the museum. The August 2020 Midwest derecho caused significant damage to the structure but the damage was not expected to affect the reconstruction schedule.

== In popular culture ==
Although some news reports confused the two buildings, this is not the same Pilgrim Baptist Church as that used as the "Triple Rock" church in the movie The Blues Brothers, which stands on 91st Street several miles to the south.

== See also ==
- Chicago architecture
