= The Roberta Martin Singers =

American gospel group

- Origin: Chicago, Illinois
- Genres: Gospel
- Years active: 1933–1970
- Labels: Fidelity, Apollo, Savoy
- Past members: Roberta Martin; Willie Webb; Eugene Smith; Norsalus McKissick; Robert Anderson; James Lawrence; W. C. Herman; Bessie Folk; Sadie Durrah; Delois Barrett-Campbell; Lucy Smith-Collier; Romance Watson; Myrtle Scott; Myrtle Jackson; Gloria Griffin; Archie Dennis; Harold Johnson; Louise McCord; Catherine Austin

The Roberta Martin Singers were an American gospel group based in the United States.

== History ==
=== Founding ===
The group was founded in 1933 by Roberta Martin, who in that same year had just become acquainted with gospel music, which was different from the traditional spirituals which were popular at the time. Theodore Frye and Thomas A. Dorsey were directing a junior choir at Ebenezer Baptist Church in Chicago, Illinois, and asked Martin to serve as the accompanist. From this junior choir, Martin selected six young men at random to form a group, Eugene Smith, Norsalus McKissick, Robert Anderson, Willie Webb, James Lawrence, and W.C. Herman. This group was named the Martin and Frye Singers, and in 1936, the group adopted the name of The Roberta Martin Singers. The Roberta Martin Singers (RMS) contained no traditional bass. For a brief period of time, the group was known as the Martin and Martin Singers, when Sallie Martin joined Roberta's group. That venture was short lived. In 1939, Anderson briefly left the group and returned in 1941 before departing for a final time in 1943, also in 1939, Martin added the first female voice to the group, Bessie Folk. By the mid-1940s, the RMS added two more women to their ranks, Sadie Durrah and Delois Barrett (Campbell), who would go on to found the Barrett Sisters.

=== Recording ===
In 1947, the group made their first recording for Fidelity Records as the "Roberta Martin Singers of Chicago", singing "Precious Memories" with Norsalus McKissick on lead. After the group's first release, the RMS made more recordings, for Religious Records of Detroit, Michigan through 1947, and for Apollo Records beginning in 1949 through 1955. Some of their most popular releases during this time include "Old Ship of Zion" (1949), "Yield Not to Temptation" (1947), "He Knows How Much You Can Bear" (1949), "Only a Look" (1949), and Eugene Smith's composition, "The Lord Will Make a Way" (1951).

Most of these recordings featured only a piano, organ, and the occasional drum accompaniment. Martin's piano playing was done in such a way that she combined both classical music and blues in her piano playing. Martin played mainly in the middle of the keyboard, providing secondary beats in the upper ranges of the keyboard, and bringing each song to a ritard at the end.

=== Group changes ===
In 1949, Eugene Smith became the group's business manager and booking agent as Martin began to concentrate on publishing music and running her own music school. Members were added or replaced older members, such as the addition of Romance Watson in 1949, and Myrtle Scott and Myrtle Jackson in 1951. Martin also began to team up with a young James Cleveland, who composed songs for the group such as "I'm Determined" (1953), "Every Now and Then" (1957) and "Since I Met Him" (1961).

Some members left to form their own groups or to sing in other groups. Willie Webb left to form the Willie Webb Singers in 1949, but returned to the group in 1953. In late 1950, Norsalus McKissick and Bessie Folk teamed up with James Cleveland to form the Gospelaires. The Gospelaires didn't last long, and McKissick was back with the RMS by 1951, Folk by 1955.

In 1956, more changes were made to the group. Willie Webb, who had served as a singer and organist for the group prior to 1949 and during 1953–1956 left, and was replaced by Lucy "Little Lucy" Smith (Collier), Martin's step daughter. Smith had previously been featured as the organist on their 1949–1952 recordings and would occasionally vocalize with the group. This time, her stay with the group would last over a decade. Smith's singing would become more substantial, becoming a regular background vocalist and soloist in 1957. Beginning in 1959, Smith would occasionally leave the organist's duties to the Savoy studio organist and accompany the group on the piano during recording sessions. Smith's organist skills were so popular that in 1962, Savoy released an LP of gospel instrumentals with Smith's organ as the only accompaniment titled Little Lucy Smith at the Organ. By 1963, Smith replaced Martin as the regular pianist and musical director on their recordings. Gloria Griffin was brought on board in 1957 to replace Bessie Folk, who'd been involved in a serious auto accident and could not sing in the group as a result.

=== Recording for Savoy ===
With these new members, the group began recording for Savoy Records. Their first session with Savoy was on January 31, 1957, in New York City. In 1958, the RMS scored their first big hit with Savoy records, "God Specializes" featuring Gloria Griffin on lead. 1958 also brought Archie Dennis into the group as a replacement for Romance Watson, as Watson began a solo career recording soul music for Coral Records. Dennis made his debut with the RMS at a program accompanying the Reverend C.L. Franklin in a weeklong revival at the Music Hall in Houston, Texas. The first recording session to feature Dennis with the RMS wasn't made until 1959. Later that year, Dennis left the RMS to serve in the US Army. Dennis's place was taken by Harold Johnson until Dennis was honorably discharged in 1961 and returned to the group. In 1962, former member Bessie Folk returned to the RMS to record with them on their album titled Out of the Depths. During 1963, Bessie Folk left for a final time to join the Sallie Martin Singers, the RMS recorded their first live album and made their first transatlantic trip to sing at the Festival of Two Worlds in Spoleto, Italy. During their time with Savoy, the group made more popular recordings, including "Grace" (1958), ""Hold the Light" (1959), "No Other Help I Know" (1962) and "There Is No Failure in God" (1963), among others.

=== Slowing down ===
By the mid-1960s, the group was beginning to slow down. Delois Barrett-Campbell left the group in 1966, with Roberta Martin's encouragement, to embark on an independent career with the Barrett Sisters. She was replaced by Louise McCord. Gloria Griffin departed the group in 1967 to embark on a solo career, as well. Earlier in the decade, Martin ceased playing piano for the group, and Lucy Smith became the group's accompanist and musical director. Under the direction of Smith, the sound of the group began to change slightly, as song arrangements become more choral sounding in nature, drum beats became more prevalent than in previous recordings, and the electric bass guitar was added.

It was also during this time that Roberta Martin became ill. Martin retired the group for a short period of time in the mid 60's, though the group came together in 1967 to record an album titled Praise God. Barrett-Campbell returned to the group for the session, as did Martin. Catherine McIntosh (Austin), a member of Martin's church choir known for working with members of the group in various capacities, sang with the group during this recording session, though not as an official member. Martin had experienced a short rebound from her illness and was able to lead one song on the album I Have Hope, which was written by Jessie Jimerson a.k.a. Jessie Phillips, a longtime friend of Roberta Martin and childhood friend of James Cleveland. Shortly after the recording, Martin's health took a severe decline, which effectively made "I Have Hope" the last song she ever recorded. On January 18, 1969, Roberta Martin died of cancer. Without their leader, the Roberta Martin Singers tried to continue but eventually disbanded in 1970

=== Solo careers ===
After Martin's death and the disbanding of the group, the former group members began to focus their attention on solo careers and careers with other groups. Delois Barrett-Campbell began working full-time with her group, the Barrett Sisters, and sang with them regularly until her health began to decline around 2006. Archie Dennis toured and sang with the Rev. Billy Graham Association from 1972 to 1977 before founding his own church in 1986.

Louise McCord recorded material with Rev. James Cleveland and the Voices of Tabernacle in the late 60s before embarking on a solo career recording for Stax, and was featured in the Wattstax concert of 1972. After her time with Stax, McCord went on to record for Savoy Records.

Gloria Griffin released her first solo album in 1967 for Atlantic Records, and worked with Rev. Donald Vails in the following decades. Willie Webb became the accompanist for the Chicago-based Rock of Ages television program during the 1970s and 1980s.

During the early 1970s, Lucy Smith Collier became the accompanist for the Chicago-based Jubilee Showcase television program. In the mid or late 1970s, Collier suffered a stroke which paralyzed her on one side, rendering her unable to play the piano or organ. Collier's stroke did not diminish her singing ability, and she continued to sing and record occasionally until the 1990s.

=== Reunion concerts ===
The group came together for a series of reunion concerts in 1981, commemorating a Smithsonian Conference on Roberta Martin, consisting of Eugene Smith, Norsalus McKissick, Archie Dennis, Romance Watson, Delois Barrett-Campbell, Louise McCord, Gloria Griffin, Bessie Folk, Lucy Smith Collier, and Richard Smallwood as accompanist. More reunion concerts followed into the 1990s.

The number of former Roberta Martin Singers began to dwindle, with the deaths of James Lawrence in 1990; Gloria Griffin, Myrtle Scott, and Robert Anderson in 1995; Norsalus McKissick in 1997; Bessie Folk on February 1, 2001; Rev. Archie L. Dennis on October 26, 2001; Eugene Smith on May 9, 2009; Lucy Smith Collier on September 19, 2010; Delois Barrett Campbell on August 2, 2011; and Louise McCord on November 3, 2020.

== Sources ==
- Tony Heilbut, The Gospel Sound: Good News and Bad Times, Simon and Schuster (1971)
- Horace Clarence Boyer, How Sweet the Sound: The Golden Age of Gospel, Elliott and Clark (1995) ISBN 0-252-06877-7
- Bernice Johnson Reagon, We'll Understand It Better By and By: Pioneering African-American Gospel Composers, Smithsonian Institution (1992), ISBN 1-56098-166-0
- Cedric J. Hayes and Robert Laughton, The Gospel Discography: 1943–1970, Eyeball Productions (2007), ISBN 0-9686445-8-9
