= Cora Martin-Moore =

American gospel singer (1927–2005)

- Born: Cora Juanita Brewer Moore; 1927; Chicago, Illinois, United States
- Died: 2005 (aged 77–78)
- Education: California State University, Dominguez Hills
- Occupations: Singer, composer
- Known for: The Sallie Martin Singers; Echoes of Eden Choir

Cora Juanita Brewer Martin-Moore (1927–2005) was an American gospel singer. She was a soloist in the Sallie Martin Singers and the director of the Echoes of Eden Choir. She also had her own music publishing company.

== Biography ==
Martin-Moore was born in 1927 in Chicago, Illinois, where she was a member of the Mount Pleasant Baptist Church. Her birth parents were Lucius and Annie Moore, but she was adopted at an early age by the gospel singer Sallie Martin. Martin-Moore joined the Sallie Martin Singers as a teenager, subsequently moving to Los Angeles, California, where she became a member of the St. Paul Baptist Church and attended California State University, Dominguez Hills. She was known for her renditions of "Eyes Hath Not Seen" and "He'll Wash You Whiter than Snow".

Martin-Moore wrote several songs, many of which were published by her own music publishing company.

In 1958, Martin-Moore became the director of the Echoes of Eden Choir in Los Angeles.

Martin-Moore died in 2005.

== Legacy ==
In 2018, Martin-Moore was included in the exhibition How Sweet the Sound: Gospel Music in Los Angeles at the California African American Museum.
