= Elder Lucy Smith =

African-American Pentecostal pastor and faith healer

Elder Lucy Turner Smith
- Church: All Nations Pentecostal Church

Personal details
- Born: Lucinda Madden; January 14, 1874 Woodstock, Georgia
- Died: June 18, 1952 (aged 78) Chicago, Illinois, U.S.
- Buried: Lincoln Cemetery, Cook County, Illinois, U.S.
- Denomination: Holiness/Pentecostal
- Residence: Chicago, Illinois
- Occupation: pastor, faith healer

Elder Lucy Smith (1874–1952), also known as Lucy Turner Smith, was an African-American Pentecostal pastor and faith healer, who founded All Nations Pentecostal Church in Chicago, Illinois. Her healing ministry attracted large numbers of followers and her church grew to have 3,000 members. She was the first woman to be the founding pastor of a church in Chicago. Upon her death in 1952, her funeral was attended by 60,000 people, and is considered to be the largest funeral held in Chicago up to that date.

== Biography ==
Lucinda Madden was born in Woodstock, Georgia, on January 14, 1874. She was one of six children, and was raised by her mother alone. Lucy married William Smith in 1896, and together they had nine children. The family moved to Athens, Georgia, in 1908. Shortly thereafter, her husband left, and Lucy began to earn a living by taking in sewing. She moved to Atlanta, and then to Chicago, where she arrived in 1910. William Smith rejoined the family in Chicago.

Lucy Smith had joined the Baptist Church when she was 12 years old. In Chicago she discovered Pentecostalism, and by 1912 was attending Stone Church, a Pentecostal assembly. She believed she had a gift for faith healing, and in 1916, she started prayer meetings in her home with two other women. As the meetings grew, Elder Smith established the Langley Avenue All Nations Pentecostal Church in 1920. At first the church did not have a permanent building, but was modeled as a "tent meeting." In the mid-twenties, Elder Smith decided to build a new church building on Langley Avenue, and construction was completed in December 1926. This would be the first church in Chicago ever established by a woman pastor.

In addition to her faith healing ministry, Elder Smith was a dynamic preacher. She developed an active community outreach program, feeding thousands during the Great Depression. She also developed a robust gospel music ministry. All Nations was one of the first African American churches to broadcast worship services on the radio. Her granddaughter, "Little Lucy" Smith Collier was a classically trained pianist and organist, and a highly regarded gospel accompanist and singer. "Little Lucy" began to lead the music ministry in the church at age 12 .

Elder Smith sold the Langley Avenue church building in 1938, and built a new church building. At the height of its popularity, All Nations had a membership of 3,000. By the end of her ministry, Elder Smith estimated that she had healed more than 200,000 people, during her weekly faith healing sessions.

She died on June 18, 1952. Over 60,000 people attended her funeral, which was the largest ever held in Chicago to that date. Her casket was carried to Lincoln Cemetery in a horse and wagon.

== Additional reading ==
Smith, Herbert Morrisohn. "Elder Lucy Smith" in African American Religious History: A Documentary Witness. Ed. Milton C. Sernott. https://doi.org/10.1215/9780822396031-052

== See also ==
- Holiness-Pentecostalism
- "Little Lucy" Smith Collier
