= Eugene Smith (singer) =

American singer

Background information
- Also known as: Eugene "Gene" Smith
- Born: Eugene Smith, Sr. April 22, 1921; Chicago, Illinois, United States
- Died: May 9, 2009 (aged 88) Chicago, Illinois
- Genre: Gospel music
- Occupations: Vocalist, composer
- Instrument: Vocals
- Years active: 1933–2009
- Labels: Fidelity; Religious Records; Apollo; Savoy
- Formerly of: The Roberta Martin Singers

Eugene Smith (April 22, 1921 – May 9, 2009) was an American gospel singer and composer.

== Early years ==
Eugene Smith was born on April 22, 1921. In 1933, Smith met Roberta Martin at Ebenezer Missionary Baptist Church when he joined the junior chorus led by Martin. That same year, Smith became one of the original Roberta Martin Singers.

== Life ==
Smith was born to devout parents from Mobile, Alabama, and attended Wendell Phillips High School in Chicago, IL. During the start of World War II, Smith briefly served in the Army, but was discharged for his height, which barely registered five feet. Smith married and had a son, Eugene Smith, Jr., but the marriage ended in divorce, and Smith became estranged from Eugene Jr.

== Musical career ==
Smith sang with the Roberta Martin Singers from the group's inception until it disbanded after Martin's death in 1969. As Smith termed his relationship with Martin in a 1981 interview for the Smithsonian, he and Martin "went together like bacon and eggs." Smith was known for his distinct baritone/tenor register, his unique delivery of songs which influenced the styles of other gospel singers such as Professor Alex Bradford and Rev. James Cleveland, and his trademark narration and sermonettes which would often stir worshippers in a frenzied ecstasy. Smith was often beckoned by music producers to release a solo album or to start his own group, but he refused and remained committed to The Roberta Martin Singers. In the early 1940s, Smith composed the gospel blues song "I Know the Lord Will Make a Way, Oh Yes He Will", which is still popular among congregations today, and in 1949, became the business manager and booking agent for the Roberta Martin Singers. After the group disbanded, Smith still sang in and around the Chicago area, and participated in various programs honoring The Roberta Martin Singers and other singers and musicians from the "Golden Era" of gospel until his death.

== Death ==
Eugene Smith died in his sleep at his apartment in Chicago, Illinois, on May 9, 2009. He was 88 years old.

== Songs ==
Smith was featured as a lead vocalist on the following songs recorded by The Roberta Martin Singers.
Fidelity Records Label Recordings

- "He's All I Need" (1947)
- "Don't Wonder About Him" (1947)

Religious Recording Label Recordings

- "Pass Me Not O Gentle Savior" (1947)

Apollo Label Recordings

- "I'll Follow in His Footsteps" (1949)
- "Do You Know Him" (1950)
- "Satisfied" (1950)
- "I am Sealed (Sealed)" (1951)
- "I Wanna See Jesus" (1951)
- "Oh! Lord, Stand By Me" (1952)
- "Come in The Room" (1952)
- "After It's All Over" (lead shared with Roberta Martin) (1952)
- "I'm Too Close" (1952)
- "Let God Abide" (lead shared with Norsalus McKissick) (1952)
- "I'm Determined" (lead shared with Norsalus McKissick) (1952)
- "Shine on Me" (1952)
- "Keep on Trusting" (1953)
- "Is There Anybody Here" (1953)
- "Marching to Zion" (1953)
- "Shine Heavenly Light" (1954)
- "He's Using Me" (lead shared with Norsalus McKissick) (1955)
- "I'm Saved" (1955)
- "There Is a Man" (1955)
- "He's Always Right There" (1956?)

Savoy Label Recordings

- "Walk in Jerusalem" (1957)
- "Every Now and Then" (lead shared with Norsalus McKissick) (1957)
- "(Crucifixion) One Day" (1957)
- "Dark Hours" (lead shared with "Little Lucy" Smith Collier) (1957)
- "I Can Make It" (1958)
- "That Great Judgment Day" (lead shared with Roberta Martin) (1959)
- "He Laid His Hands on Me" (1959)
- "He Never Said a Word" (1960)
- "It's Gonna Rain" (1960)
- "He's Leading Me" (1960)
- "I Couldn't Hear Nobody Pray" (1961)
- "All Things Are Possible" (1961)
- "It Was the Blood" (1962)
- "Come Lord Jesus" (1963)
- "Didn't It Rain" (1964)
- "The Failure's Not in God, It's in Me" (lead shared with Norsalus McKissick, Gloria Griffin, and "Little" Lucy Smith Collier) (1964)
- "Standing on the Promises" (1965)
- "The God I Serve" (1965)
- "He's The One" (1966)
- "Saved" (1968)
