= No Maps on My Taps =

No Maps On My Taps
- Directed by: George Nierenberg
- Written by: Lynn Rogoff
- Produced by: George T. Nierenberg
- Starring: Howard Sims; Bunny Briggs; Chuck Green; Lionel Hampton
- Music by: Lionel Hampton
- Distributed by: PBS; Direct Cinema Limited
- Release date: 1979
- Country: United States

No Maps on My Taps is a 1979 American documentary film directed by George Nierenberg. The film recounts the history of tap dancing in America through the lives of three influential tap dancers, Chuck Green, Howard Sims, and Bunny Briggs, and showcases their dancing skills in a historic live performance at Smalls Paradise nightclub in Harlem.

The film is a wistful tribute to the careers of the performers and to an art form that at the time of filming seemed to be waning. According to a review in The New Yorker, "Ironically, “No Maps on My Taps,” whose participants regarded it as an elegy, helped to start a tap revival in the eighties. The film was shown in festival after festival. Its stars travelled with it and danced, live, after the screenings."

The film won Lionel Hampton a News and Documentary Emmy Award for Outstanding Musical Direction in 1981.

== Structure ==
The dancers all recount their biographies and influences while rehearsing for a gala performance at a nightclub. Scenes of the performers dancing and kidding each other are interspersed with archival images and film footage of their early days. Also shown are archival film scenes featuring performances by John W. Bubbles and Bill Robinson. The film ends with a climactic dance-off in front of a live audience, with music provided by a jazz band fronted by Lionel Hampton.
