= George Nierenberg =

American film producer

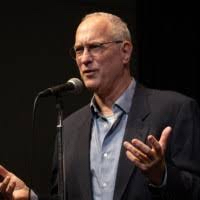
George Nierenberg giving a lecture

George T. Nierenberg is a New York-based documentary filmmaker and creator of GTN Creative. He has worked on films and television documentaries.

His 1975 film The Hollow is a documentary about a family in the Adirondacks. His 1979 Emmy award winning film "No Maps on My Taps" explored American tap dance and has been credited as bringing about a revival to the form. Following the success of the film, famous featured tap dancers began the "No Maps on My Taps and Company" tour around the world, performing at over 60 locations. Again documenting the culture around tap dance, Nierenberg made "About Tap", featuring Gregory Hines and stylistic performances and recollections by three of America’s leading male tap dancers: Steve Condos, Jimmy Slyde and Chuck Green. For his contribution to the form, Nierenberg was awarded in 2014 the American Tap Dance Foundation's Tap Preservation Award, given to an outstanding individual or organization in the field for the superior advancement of tap dance through presentation and preservation.

His 1982 film Say Amen Somebody! documents gospel music and New York Magazine placed it at number 31 on their list of the 50 Best Documentaries of All Time in 2019. In "That Rhythm, Those Blues" (1988), Nierenberg celebrated R&B and laid bare the racism in the music industry of the 1950s, for which Nierenberg was nominated for a Best Director Emmy. Milestone Films restored and re-released "Say Amen, Somebody" and "No Maps on My Taps" theatrically to acclaim in 2017.

Working in television, Nierenberg produced, directed and developed projects for PBS, AMC, Bravo, Nickelodeon, and Sony BMG, including: Neon Lights, for National Geographic’s Explorer and a film on Voodoo in Haiti for ABC’s Day One. In 1983, Nierenberg made "Moment of Crisis" about the JFK assassination for NBC. Nierenberg was enlisted as a producer to launch Saturday Night with Connie Chung on CBS.

== Style ==
George Nierenberg is an acclaimed filmmaker whose career has spanned the worlds of independent features, network, cable and international television, and corporate videos. His work has been released by MGM/UA, has appeared on CBS, ABC, Bravo, BCC, and has earned numerous illustrious honors, establishing him as a producer/director with a knack both for managing complex productions and for bringing his subjects to life. He is known for his ability to create visually strong stories that bring out the humanity in their subjects and reach audiences on an emotional level.

Speaking on his work, Nierenberg said, "The camera helps you see what you see, but as the director I help you feel what I feel."

== Film and television ==
- The Hollow (1975)
- No Maps on My Taps (1979)
- Say Amen, Somebody (1983)
- "About Tap" (1985)
- "That Rhythm, Those Blues", American Experience (season 1) episode (December 6, 1988)
- "Saturday Night With Connie Chung" (1989–90) on CBS.
- "Neon Lights" (1992)
- "Day One" (1992) on ABC
- "NEON LIGHTS" (1992)
- "Gotta Dance!" (1995)
- "Head of Class: The Lion King" (2000)
- "Bill Withers' Just As I Am" (2005)
