= Edna Gallmon Cooke =

American singer

Background information
- Also known as: Sweetheart of the Potomac
- Born: Edna Gallmon; November 30, 1917; Columbia, South Carolina, US
- Died: September 4, 1967 Philadelphia, Pennsylvania
- Genre: Gospel
- Occupation: Singer
- Years active: 1949–1967
- Label: Federal Records Nashboro Records / Universal Music

Madame Edna Gallmon Cooke (November 30, 1917 – September 4, 1967) was an American gospel singer and recording artist from 1949 until her death in 1967. Personal information about Cooke is scarce and most of her biographical details have been gleaned from the liner notes of her various albums. Gallmon Cooke is best known for her recordings of "Stop Gambler" and "Heavy Load".

Born in Columbia, South Carolina, United States, in 1917, the daughter of a Baptist preacher, Reverend Eddie J. Gallmon also a former pastor at Bethlehem Baptist Church (College place). Edna Gallmon Cooke was more formally educated and musically trained than most of her gospel peers. As a young adult, she lived and studied in Washington, D.C., and Philadelphia, attending Temple University and briefly teaching elementary school. She had contemplated a career in semi-classics and show tunes when she underwent a musical conversion of sorts after hearing gospel singer, Willie Mae Ford Smith in the late 1930s. "I was shocked. The woman sang with such finesse ... I knew I had to be a gospel singer." Shortly after, Gallmon Cooke joined the Holiness Church and became preeminently consecrated—with the Holiness Church bestowing the honorific ‘Madame’ to her name to announce her devotion.

During the 1940s, Gallmon Cooke toured the Southeast, billed as the "Sweetheart of the Potomac". She performed hymns and gospel songs in the manner of Willie Mae Ford Smith, but her mezzo-soprano could not duplicate Smith's contralto blasts. Elaborating on that style, Gallmon Cooke returned to familiar sources, popularizing the sermonettes and spirituals her father Eddie Gallmon had performed in the 1920s. Gallmon Cooke became a "transcendent moaner and a mistress of what note-bending musicologists call melisma and church folks call curlicues, runs and flowers and frills." Ms. Cooke began recording in the late 1940s for the Nashboro Recording Label in Nashville, Tennessee, usually accompanied by her father's choir, The Young People's Choir of the Springfield Baptist Church of Washington, DC. Her later recordings included male vocal groups.

Gallmon Cooke's commanding switch in styles occurred after her marriage to Barney Parks, Jr., a former member of The Dixie Hummingbirds and a founder of The Sensational Nightingales. They had met in 1951 when Marie Knight, Rosetta Tharpe's old partner, organized a tour featuring herself, Cooke, and The Nightingales. Under Park's management and direction, Madame Edna Gallmon Cooke became a household name in gospel. It is suspected that the name Cooke was from her first marriage which ended because of the death of her husband.

The liner notes to "Mother Smith and Her Children" describes Madame Cooke as "an exquisite stylist, with a sensuous appeal akin to Billie Holiday. She is referred to as rap music's gospel progenitor; a penchant for rhymed, spoken chants produced her most famous recordings."

She died in Philadelphia, Pennsylvania, on September 4, 1967. She was 49 years old.
