= Thomas A. Dorsey =

American blues and gospel musician and composer (1899–1993)

- Thomas Dorsey during his "Georgia Tom" blues period, late 1920s

Background information
- Also known as: Georgia Tom
- Born: Thomas Andrew Dorsey; July 1, 1899; Villa Rica, Georgia, U.S.
- Died: January 23, 1993 (aged 93) Chicago, Illinois, U.S.
- Genres: Gospel; Blues
- Occupations: Musician; Composer; Evangelist
- Instrument: Piano
- Years active: 1924–1984
- Formerly of: Ma Rainey; Tampa Red; Mahalia Jackson; Albertina Walker

Thomas Andrew Dorsey (July 1, 1899 – January 23, 1993) was an American musician, composer, and Christian evangelist influential in the development of early blues and 20th-century gospel music. He penned 3,000 songs, a third of them gospel, including "Take My Hand, Precious Lord" and "Peace in the Valley". Recordings of these sold millions of copies in both gospel and secular markets in the 20th century.

Born in rural Georgia, Dorsey grew up in a religious family but gained most of his musical experience playing blues piano at barrelhouses and parties in Atlanta. He moved to Chicago and became a proficient composer and arranger of jazz and vaudeville just as blues was becoming popular. He gained fame accompanying blues belter Ma Rainey on tour and, billed as "Georgia Tom", joined with guitarist Tampa Red in a successful recording career.

After a spiritual awakening, Dorsey began concentrating on writing and arranging religious music. Aside from the lyrics, he saw no real distinction between blues and church music, and viewed songs as a supplement to spoken word preaching. Dorsey served as the music director at Chicago's Pilgrim Baptist Church for 50 years, introducing musical improvisation and encouraging personal elements of participation such as clapping, stomping, and shouting in churches when these were widely condemned as unrefined and common. In 1932, he co-founded the National Convention of Gospel Choirs and Choruses, an organization dedicated to training musicians and singers from all over the U.S. that remains active. The first generation of gospel singers in the 20th century worked or trained with Dorsey: Sallie Martin, Mahalia Jackson, Roberta Martin, and James Cleveland, among others.

Author Anthony Heilbut summarized Dorsey's influence by saying he "combined the good news of gospel with the bad news of blues". Called the "Father of Gospel Music" and often credited with creating it, Dorsey more accurately spawned a movement that popularized gospel blues throughout black churches in the United States, which in turn influenced American music and parts of society at large.

== Early life (1899–1918) ==
Thomas A. Dorsey was born in Villa Rica, Georgia, the first of three children to Thomas Madison Dorsey, a minister and farmer, and Etta Plant Spencer. The Dorseys sharecropped on a small farm, while the elder Dorsey, a graduate of Atlanta Bible College (now Morehouse College), traveled to nearby churches to preach. He also taught black children at a one-room schoolhouse where his son accompanied him and listened to lessons. (Note: Accounts of how many children the Dorseys had depend on the source. (Harris, p. 24. states three, Marovich, p. 71 states five))

Religion and music were at the center of the Dorseys' lives, and young Thomas was exposed to a variety of musical styles in his early childhood. While often living hand-to-mouth, the Dorseys were able to own an organ, which was rare for black families, and Dorsey's mother played during his father's church services. His uncle was also a musician, a traveling guitarist concentrating on country blues while it was in its infancy. Villa Rica's rural location allowed Dorsey to hear slave spirituals, and "moaning" – a style of singing marked by elongated notes and embellishments widespread among Southern black people – alongside the Protestant hymns his father favored. Furthermore, when Thomas's father traveled to preach at other churches, Thomas and his mother attended a church that practiced shape note singing; their harmonizing in particular made a deep impression on him.

The Dorseys moved to Atlanta to find better opportunities when Thomas was eight years old. The adjustment for the entire family was difficult, culminating in Thomas's being isolated, held back at school, and eventually dropping out after the fourth grade when he was twelve years old.

Directionless, Dorsey began attending shows at the nearby 81 Theater that featured blues musicians and live vaudeville acts. Soon he began selling concessions there, and aspiring to join the theater band, honed his musical skills on his family's organ and a relative's piano, picking out melodies that he had heard and practicing long hours. He studied informally with musicians at the theater and local dance bands, always playing blues. Despite being meagerly compensated, he played rent parties, house parties, barrelhouses, and brothels, but enjoyed the social life of a musician. Due to the spontaneous nature of the events Dorsey worked, he became proficient at improvising, and along the way, learned to read musical notation.

== Blues career (1919–1925) ==
Seeking a greater challenge, Dorsey relocated to Chicago in 1919, where he learned that his style of playing was unfashionable compared to the newer uptempo styles of jazz. Encountering more competition for jobs and with his concentration primarily on blues, Dorsey turned to composing, copyrighting his first song in 1920, titled "If You Don't Believe I'm Leaving, You Can Count the Days I'm Gone". In doing so, he became one of the first musicians to copyright blues music.

Dorsey seemed ambivalent about writing church music until 1921 when he was inspired by W. M. Nix's rendition of "I Do, Don't You?" (Note: Originally published by Edwin Othello Excell) after hearing him perform at the National Baptist Convention. Nix elongated some notes to emphasize specific syllables and words and sped up others. Dorsey found appeal in the freedom and potential that came with improvising within established hymns, allowing singers and musicians to infuse more emotion – particularly joy and elation – into their performances to move congregations. Upon hearing Nix sing, Dorsey was overcome, later recalling that his "heart was inspired to become a great singer and worker in the Kingdom of the Lord – and impress people just as this great singer did that Sunday morning". The experience prompted him to copyright his first religious song in 1922, "If I Don't Get There", a composition in the style of Charles Tindley, whom Dorsey idolized. Sacred music could not sustain him financially, however, so he continued to work in blues.

Two of his secular songs were recorded by Monette Moore and another by Joe "King" Oliver, ensuring Dorsey a place as one of Chicago's top blues composers. His reputation led him to become a music arranger for Paramount Records and the Chicago Music Publishing Company. In 1923, he became the pianist and leader of the Wild Cats Jazz Band accompanying Gertrude "Ma" Rainey, a charismatic and bawdy blues shouter who sang about lost love and hard times. Rainey interacted with her audiences, who were often so enthralled they stood up and shouted back at her while she sang. The night Rainey opened at Chicago's largest black theater Dorsey is remembered as "the most exciting moment in my life".

Dorsey worked with Rainey and her band for two years, wherein he composed and arranged her music in the blues style he was accustomed to, as well as vaudeville and jazz to please audiences' tastes. In 1925, he married Nettie Harper, hired by Rainey as a wardrobe mistress despite her inexperience, so she could join Dorsey on tour.

== Transition to gospel music (1926–1930) ==
Rainey enjoyed enormous popularity touring with a hectic schedule, but beginning in 1926 Dorsey was plagued by a two-year period of deep depression, even contemplating suicide. He experienced a spiritual re-invigoration of sorts in 1928. While attending a church service with his sister-in-law, Dorsey claimed the minister who prayed over him pulled a live serpent from his throat, prompting his immediate recovery. Thereafter, he vowed to concentrate all his efforts in gospel music. After the death of a close friend, Dorsey was inspired to write his first religious song with a blues influence, "If You See My Savior, Tell Him That You Saw Me". (Note: Sometimes titled "Standing at the Bedside of a Neighbor")

Give me a song, I stick to the note and play it like it is, you won't pay much attention to it. In fact it won't go anywhere. You got to always have something: a little trick, a little embellishment or something. I don't go and take it just straight; I got to put something in it to get over.

— Thomas Dorsey

As the blues grew in popularity in the 1920s, black churches condemned it widely for being associated with sin and hedonism. Music performed in established black churches in Chicago and throughout the U.S. came from hymnals and was performed as written, usually as a way to showcase the musical abilities of the choirs rather than as a vehicle to deliver a specific spiritual message. Many churches sought prestige in their musical offerings, which were often ornate and sophisticated liturgical compositions by classical European composers, such as Handel's Messiah (1742) and Mozart's Alleluia (1773). Personal expressions such as clapping, stomping, and improvising with lyrics, rhythm, and melody were actively discouraged as being unrefined and degrading to the music and the singer.

Dorsey tried to market his new sacred music by printing thousands of copies of his songs to sell directly to churches and publishers, even going door to door, but he was ultimately unsuccessful. He returned to blues, recording "It's Tight Like That" with guitarist Hudson "Tampa Red" Whittaker despite his misgivings over the suggestive lyrics. The record sold more than seven million copies. Billed as "Tampa Red and Georgia Tom" and "The Famous Hokum Boys", the duo found great success together, eventually collaborating on 60 songs between 1928 and 1932, and coining the term "Hokum" to describe their guitar/piano combination with simple, racy lyrics. (Note: Dorsey also recorded under the names George Ramsey, Memphis Jim, Memphis Mose, Railroad Bill, Smokehouse Charley, Texas Tommy, and others. (Staig, Laurence, "Obituary: Thomas Dorsey", The Independent, January 25, 1993, p. 12.))

Unsure if gospel music could sustain him, Dorsey was nonetheless pleased to discover that he made an impression at the National Baptist Convention in 1930 when, unknown to him, Willie Mae Ford Smith sang "If You See My Savior" during a morning meeting. She was asked to sing it twice more; the response was so enthusiastic that Dorsey sold 4,000 print copies of his song. In between recording sessions with Tampa Red, and inspired by the compliments he received, he formed a choir at Ebenezer Baptist Church at the request of the pastor, Reverend James Smith, who had an affinity for Negro spirituals and indigenous singing styles. Dorsey and Ebenezer's music director Theodore Frye trained the new chorus to deliver his songs with a gospel blues sound: lively, joyous theatrical performances with embellished and elongated notes accentuated with rhythmic clapping and shouts. At their debut, Frye strutted up and down the aisles and sang back and forth with the chorus, and at one point Dorsey jumped up from the piano stool in excitement and stood as he played. When the pastor at Pilgrim Baptist, Chicago's second largest black church, saw the way it moved the congregation, he hired Dorsey as music director, allowing him to dedicate all his time to gospel music.

== Leader of a movement (1930–1933) ==
This new style began to catch on in Chicago, and Dorsey's musical partners Theodore Frye, Magnolia Lewis Butts, and Henry Carruthers urged him to organize a convention where musicians could learn gospel blues. In 1932 however, just as Dorsey co-founded the Gospel Choral Union of Chicago – eventually renamed the National Convention of Gospel Choirs and Choruses (NCGCC), his wife Nettie died in childbirth, then 24 hours later, their son. (Note: Dorsey later filed a medical malpractice lawsuit against the Illinois Research Clinic in response. The outcome of this is unknown other than the clinic stating they would no longer serve black patients. (Marovich, p. 102.)) His grief prompted him to write one of his most famous and enduring compositions, "Take My Hand, Precious Lord". (Note: The song is attributed to Dorsey; the melody is influenced by "Must Jesus Bear the Cross Alone?" by George Nelson Allen (1852). (Harris, pp. 209–240.))

Chapters of the NCGCC opened in St. Louis and Cleveland. Now at the center of gospel music activity in Chicago, Dorsey countered his bereavement by immersing himself in marketing his songs. An unintended consequence of his sales strategy helped spread gospel blues, as he worked with numerous musicians who assisted in selling his sheet music traveling to churches in and around Chicago. Rehearsals for sales pitches took place in Dorsey's nearly bare room in his uncle's house. Frye and Sallie Martin were two of the first and most effective singers Dorsey took with him to market his work. Dorsey and Martin established a publishing company called Dorsey House of Music, the first black-owned gospel publishing house in the U.S. His sheet music sold so well, according to Heilbut, it supplanted the first book of compiled songs for black churches, W. M. Nix's Gospel Pearls, and the family Bible in black households. He also mentored many young musicians, including training a teenage Mahalia Jackson when she first arrived in Chicago, although he said she did not entirely accept his instruction: "She said I was trying to make a stereotyped singer out of her."

In addition to the high spirited choir performances, Dorsey began introducing uptempo Negro spirituals, what he referred to as "jubilees", alongside published hymns in worship services. Faced with rapid changes, old-line church members who preferred formal, more sedate music programs objected, leading to conflicts in and between Chicago's black churches. As a result, his sales pitches and chorus performances were not always well received. He is often quoted saying that he had "been kicked out of the best churches in the country". He found resistance among ministers, musicians, and parishioners alike. Some objected to the degradation of worship through blues shouting. Others took offense to such lively music overshadowing the minister's spoken word, or women delivering spiritual messages through song, taking the place of the preacher who was typically male.

Simultaneously, a shift in Chicago's black churches was taking place. Hundreds of thousands of newly arrived migrants from the South, with an appreciation of blues, began to outnumber an older guard of ministers and parishioners who favored classical European music in services. Ministers who would not have considered changing their music programs just a few years before became more open to new ideas. Services were thus altered in multiple ways to welcome the influx of migrants, for spiritual and pragmatic reasons: attracting and keeping new members helped reconcile many churches' debts.

Despite the objections, within months gospel blues had proven to be established in Chicago's black churches. In 1933, Dorsey directed a 600-person chorus at the second meeting of the NCGCC, now boasting 3,500 members in 24 states. Black gospel choirs were asked to perform at several white churches in Chicago. And Dorsey's own Pilgrim Baptist Church choir performed at the 1933 World's Fair.

== Later life (1934–1993) ==
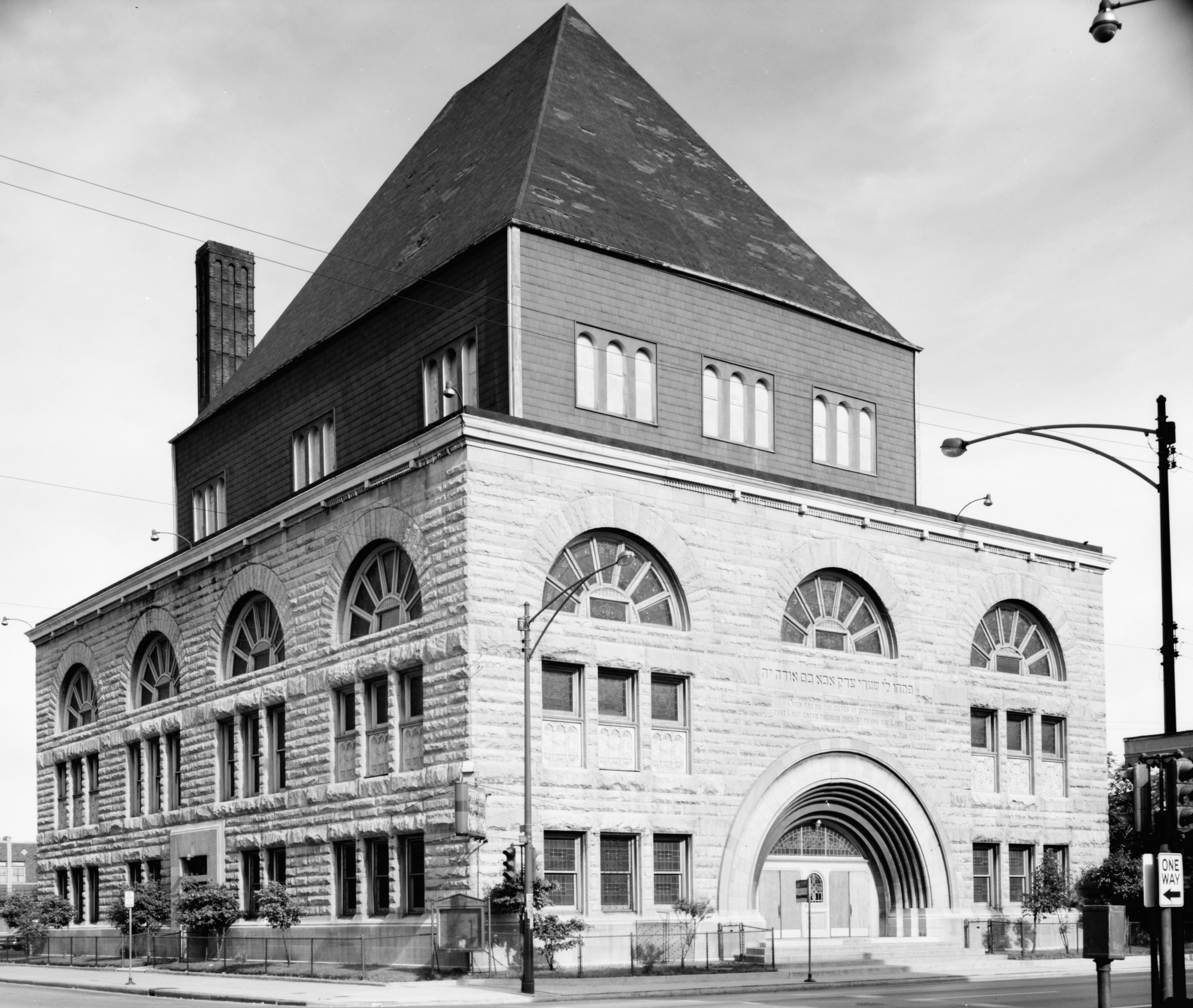
Pilgrim Baptist Church in Chicago, 1964, where Dorsey was music director for 50 years

Dorsey lived a quiet life despite his influence. He did not seek publicity, preferring to remain at his position as music director at the 3,000-seat Pilgrim Baptist Church and running his publishing company. As the head of the NCGCC, he traveled the "gospel highway": a circuit of churches and similar venues throughout the U.S. where he trained singers and choirs. Between 1932 and 1944, he held "Evenings with Dorsey" on this circuit, teaching novices the best ways to deliver his songs. He also toured extensively with Mahalia Jackson in the 1940s, who was by this time the preeminent gospel singer in the world. Never considering himself a strong singer, Dorsey recorded gospel music sporadically up to 1934, and two songs in 1953 were his last, though he continued to write.

During his blues period, Dorsey presented himself as dapper and dignified, which carried over into his gospel work. He is described as stately and often detached, one writer attesting that from a distance, "Dorsey is not presented as a happy man. Fulfilled, perhaps. Doing the Lord's work, absolutely. But he never smiles, rarely relaxes, and when he talks it's with a brooding vigilance bordering on surliness. He is a truly mesmerizing figure, the stuff of which legends are made." However, once known, Dorsey could offer a "charming smile", according to Heilbut, and his enthusiasm "often lifts his voice to an irrepressible falsetto". After writing to his sister that he was lonely and wanted to be around children, she sent Dorsey's niece Lena McLin to live with him. McLin remembered that her uncle was "soft-spoken, not loud at all, and very well dressed... he always had a shirt and a tie and a suit, and he was always elegant, very mannerly, very nice. And he would sit at the piano and play something and say, 'That's good stuff!'" (Note: McLin became a composer, singer, and voice coach for Chaka Khan, Jennifer Hudson, and Mandy Patinkin. (Ben-Arnots, Zach, Living legends of Chicago gospel honor tradition, carry on family legacies", ABC7Chicago.com (July 31, 2019). Retrieved August 2020.))

He remarried in 1941 to Katheryn Mosley (1925-2011). They had two children, a son named Thomas M. "Mickey" and a daughter, Doris. Even with a family he remained active in music, attending multiple engagements each year. Katheryn Dorsey stated, "I'd have to catch him between trains because he was hardly ever at home... The only thing he cared about was saving souls through his music."

To accomplish this, Dorsey traveled beyond the U.S., through Mexico, the Caribbean, Europe, and the Middle East. He recalled visiting Damascus, Syria, where he was approached in a bathroom by a man who recognized his name. A tour group of 150 demanded he sing "Take My Hand, Precious Lord" right there. Obliging, Dorsey began, but the multinational group took over: "And they knew it in Damascus, too. Folk was wipin' their eyes, and some cryin' and bawlin' on, and I told ‘em, 'What is this happenin' here? I'll never get out of this place alive.'"

When he gave interviews later in his life, he never condemned blues music or his experiences in that period. He remained in contact with his friends and fellow blues musicians, saying, "I'm not ashamed of my blues. It's all the same talent. A beat is a beat whatever it is." Dorsey began to slow down in the 1970s, eventually showing symptoms of Alzheimer's disease. He retired from Pilgrim Baptist Church and the NCGCC soon after, though he continued to participate and perform when he was able. He and the NCGCC were featured in the critically acclaimed documentary Say Amen, Somebody in 1982. The 1981 meeting featured in the film was the last convention he was able to attend. Dorsey died of Alzheimer's at his home in Chicago on January 23, 1993, listening to music on a Walkman. He is buried at Oak Woods Cemetery in Chicago.

== Legacy ==
Gospel historian Horace Boyer writes that gospel music "has no more imposing figure" than Dorsey, and the Cambridge Companion to Blues and Gospel Music states that he "defined" the genre. Folklorist Alan Lomax claims that Dorsey "literally invented gospel". In Living Blues, Jim O'Neal compares Dorsey in gospel to W. C. Handy, who was the first and most influential blues composer, "with the notable difference that Dorsey developed his tradition from within, rather than 'discovering' it from an outsider's vantage point". Although he was not the first to join elements of the blues to religious music, he earned the honorific "Father of Gospel Music", according to gospel singer and historian Bernice Johnson Reagon, for his "aggressive campaign for its use as worship songs in black Protestant churches". (Note: Numerous sources state Dorsey coined the term "gospel" to refer to sacred music, but W. M. Nix, the singer who inspired Dorsey at the 1921 National Baptist Convention, compiled a songbook titled Gospel Pearls to sell at the convention, which was the first mention of "gospel" to refer to music in black churches. Dorsey moreover considered Charles Tindley to be the originator of gospel music. (Harris, p. 68., Heilbut, p. 25.))

Throughout his career, Dorsey composed more than 1,000 gospel and 2,000 blues songs, an achievement Mahalia Jackson considered equal to Irving Berlin's body of work. The manager of a gospel quartet active in the 1930s stated that songs written by Dorsey and other songwriters copying him spread so far in such a short time that they were called "dorseys". Horace Boyer attributes this popularity to "simple but beautiful melodies", unimposing harmonies, and room for improvisation within the music. Lyrically, according to Boyer, Dorsey was "skilled at writing songs that not only captured the hopes, fears, and aspirations of the poor and disenfranchised African Americans but also spoke to all people". Anthony Heilbut further explains that "the gospel of [Charles] Tindley and Dorsey talks directly to the poor. In so many words, it's about rising above poverty while still living humble deserting the ways of the world while retaining its best tunes."

Aside from his prodigious songwriting, Dorsey's influence in the gospel blues movement brought about change both for individuals in the black community and communities as a whole. He introduced rituals and standards among gospel choirs that are still in use. At the beginning of worship services, Dorsey instructed choruses to march from the rear of the sanctuary to the choir-loft in a specific way, singing all the while. Choir members were encouraged to be physically active while singing, rocking and swaying with the music. He insisted that songs be memorized rather than chorus members reading music or lyrics while performing. This freed the choir members' hands to clap, and he knew anyway that most of the chorus singers in the early 1930s were unable to read music. Moreover, Dorsey refused to provide musical notation, or use it while directing, because he felt the music was only to be used as a guide, not strictly followed. Including all the embellishments in gospel blues would make the notation prohibitively complicated. Dorsey instead asked his singers to rely on feeling.

I think about all these blue-collar people who had to deal with Jim Crow, meager salaries, and yet the maid who cleaned up somebody else's house all week long, the porter, the chauffeur, the gardener, the cook, were nobody. They had to sit in the back of the bus, they were denied their rights, but when they walked into their church on Sunday morning and put on a robe and went down that aisle and stood on that choir stand, the maid became a coloratura, and when she stood before her church of five hundred to a thousand, two thousand people, she knew she was somebody. And I think the choir meant so much to those people because for a few hours on Sunday, they were royalty.

— Gospel singer Donald Vails

While presiding over rehearsals, Dorsey was strict and businesslike. He demanded that members attend practice regularly and that they should live their lives by the same standards promoted in their songs. For women, that included not wearing make-up. Choruses were stocked primarily with women, often untrained singers with whom Dorsey worked personally, encouraging many women who had little to no participation in church before to become active. Similarly, the NCGCC in 1933 is described by Dorsey biographer Michael W. Harris as "a women's movement" as nine of the thirteen presiding officer positions were held by women. (Note: NCGCC annual meetings were also attended by members of the National Association for the Advancement of Colored People (NAACP) and the National Association of Negro Musicians; the NCGCC sent letters that urged senators to vote for an anti-lynching bill in 1937.(Norton, Kay, "‘'es, [Gospel] Is Real': Half a Century with Chicago's Martin and Morris Company", Journal of the Society for American Music, (2017), Volume 11, Number 4, pp. 420–451.))

Due to Dorsey's influence, the definition of gospel music shifted away from sacred song compositions to religious music that causes a physical release of pain and suffering, particularly in black churches. He infused joy and optimism in his written music as he directed his choirs to do perform with uplifting fervor as they sang. The cathartic nature of gospel music became integral to the black experience in the Great Migration, when hundreds of thousands of black Southerners moved to Northern cities like Detroit, Washington, D.C., and especially Chicago between 1919 and 1970. These migrants were refugees from poverty and the systemic racism endemic throughout the Jim Crow South. They created enclaves within neighborhoods through church choirs, which doubled as social clubs, offering a sense of purpose and belonging.

Encountering a "golden age" between 1940 and 1960, gospel music introduced recordings and radio broadcasts featuring singers who had all been trained by Dorsey or one of his protégées. As Dorsey is remembered as the father of gospel music, other honorifics came from his choirs: Sallie Martin, considered the mother of gospel (although Willie Mae Ford Smith, also a Dorsey associate, has also been called this), Mahalia Jackson, the queen of gospel, and James Cleveland, often named the king of gospel. In 1936, members of Dorsey's junior choir became the Roberta Martin Singers, a successful recording group which set the standard for gospel ensembles, both for groups and individual voice roles within vocal groups. In Dorsey's wake, R&B artists Dinah Washington, who was a member of the Sallie Martin Singers, Sam Cooke, originally in the gospel band the Soul Stirrers, Ray Charles, Little Richard, James Brown, and the Coasters recorded both R&B and gospel songs, moving effortlessly between the two, as Dorsey did, and bringing elements of gospel to mainstream audiences.

Despite racial segregation in churches and the music industry, Dorsey's music had widespread crossover appeal. Prominent hymnal publishers began including his compositions in the late 1930s, ensuring his music would be sung in white churches. His song "Peace in the Valley", written in 1937 originally for Mahalia Jackson, was recorded by, among others, Red Foley in 1951, and Elvis Presley in 1957, selling more than a million copies each. Foley's version has been entered into the National Recording Registry as a culturally significant recording worthy of preservation.

Notably, "Take My Hand, Precious Lord" was the favorite song of Martin Luther King Jr., who asked Dorsey to play it for him on the eve of his assassination. Mahalia Jackson sang at his funeral when King did not get to hear it. Anthony Heilbut writes that "the few days following his death, 'Precious Lord' seemed the truest song in America, the last poignant cry of nonviolence before a night of storm that shows no sign of ending". Four years later, Aretha Franklin sang it at Jackson's funeral. Since its debut it has been translated into 50 languages. (Note: Dorsey later stated that all the praise he received for this song never eclipsed his grief, saying, "None of it's ever been soothing to me, from that day to this day." Labowskie, Mark, "Say Amen, Somebody (1982)", Pop Matters (March 11, 2007). Retrieved August 2020.)

Chicago held its first gospel music festival as a tribute to Dorsey in 1985; it has taken place each year since then. Though he never returned to his hometown, efforts to honor Dorsey in Villa Rica, Georgia, began a week after his death. Mount Prospect Baptist Church, where his father preached and Dorsey learned music at his mother's organ, was declared a historic site by the city, and a historical marker was placed at the location where his family's house once stood. The Thomas A. Dorsey Birthplace and Gospel Heritage Festival, established in 1994, remains active.

As of 2020, the National Convention of Gospel Choirs and Choruses has 50 chapters around the world.

== Popular compositions ==
- "Take My Hand, Precious Lord"
- "Peace in the Valley"
- "The Lord Will Make a Way Somehow" ("Like a Ship That's Tossed and Driven")
- "Old Ship of Zion"
- "If We Ever Needed the Lord Before"
- "Search Me, Lord"

== Honors ==
- Nashville Songwriters Hall of Fame, inducted 1979 (Note: Dorsey was the first black person to be inducted into the Nashville Songwriters Hall of Fame. (Poe, Janita, "Thomas A Dorsey, Gospel Pioneer", The Chicago Tribune January 25, 1993,. p. 6.))
- Georgia Music Hall of Fame, inducted 1981
- Gospel Music Hall of Fame, inducted 1982
- Governor's Award for the Arts in Chicago, given 1985
- National Trustees Award from the National Academy of Recording Arts and Sciences, given 1992
- National Recording Registry: sound recordings considered "culturally, historically or aesthetically significant" by the Library of Congress
  - "If I Could Hear My Mother Pray Again" (1934), added in 2007 – recorded by Dorsey, written by John Whitfield Vaughan in 1922
  - "Peace In The Valley" by Red Foley and the Sunshine Boys (1951), added in 2006
  - Precious Lord: New Recordings of the Great Songs of Thomas A. Dorsey by Various Artists (1973), added 2002
- Blues Hall of Fame: Performer, inducted 2018
  - "It's Tight Like That": Classic of Blues Recording–Single or Album Track, inducted 2014
  - "Future Blues" by Willie Brown: Classic of Blues Recording–Single or Album Track, inducted 2020/2021 (based on "Last Minute Blues", written by Dorsey, recorded by Ma Rainey)

== See also ==
List of people considered a founder in a Humanities field
