= Marion Williams =

American gospel singer (1927–1994)

Background information
- Born: August 29, 1927; Miami, Florida, U.S.
- Died: July 2, 1994 (aged 66) Philadelphia, Pennsylvania, U.S.
- Genres: Gospel music
- Occupations: Singer

Marion Williams (August 29, 1927 – July 2, 1994) was an American gospel singer.

== Early years ==
Marion Williams was born in Miami, Florida, to a religiously devout mother and musically inclined father. She left school when she was nine years old to help support the family, and worked as a maid, a nurse, and in factories and laundries. She began singing in front of audiences while young. As was common in the area, Williams learned African American blues and jazz, alongside Caribbean calypso.

Poverty caused Williams to leave school at fourteen to work with her mother at a laundry, although she eventually graduated from Pacific Union College in 1987. She sang at church and on street corners, inspired by a wide range of musicians, including Sister Rosetta Tharpe and the Smith Jubilee Singers.

She stayed with gospel in spite of pressure to switch to popular blues tunes or the opera.

== Career ==
In 1946, while visiting a friend in Philadelphia, Williams happened to sing before an audience that included Clara and Gertrude Ward. They recognized her talent and offered her a job. A year later, she became part of the Famous Ward Singers. Her growling, hands-on-the-hips vocal style made her one of the group's undisputed stars.

In 1958, she and other members of the Ward group formed the Stars of Faith. In 1965, Williams began her solo career. For the next 15 years, she toured the United States, Africa and the West Indies.

In 1992, critic and music historian Dave McGee, writing in The Rolling Stone Album Guide, said "One will come away from her recordings believing that she was nothing less than the greatest singer ever".

== Musical career ==
=== The Ward Singers ===
Williams was invited to join the Ward Singers when they heard her singing during a visit to a close friend in Philadelphia in 1946. Williams finally joined them in 1947, staying with them for eleven years. Her first recording with the group was "How Far Am I from Canaan" (1948), followed by the breakthrough "Surely God Is Able", which launched Williams and the rest of the group into super-stardom. Their concerts were mobbed by frenzied fans.

=== Stars of Faith ===
Dissatisfied with the low pay she was receiving while starring for the group, Williams left the Ward Singers in 1958, followed by most of the rest of the group, to form the Stars of Faith. The new group was unable, however, to reproduce the success the Ward Singers had enjoyed, as Williams retreated from the spotlight to give other members of the group more opportunity to star. The group's career recovered, however, in 1961, when it appeared in Black Nativity, an Off-Broadway production, and toured across North America and Europe.

=== Solo career ===
In 1965, Williams began a solo career. While in Miami for her mother's funeral, she felt re-inspired to continue her career and began touring college campuses across the country. The recording that is perhaps her best-known hit, "Standing Here Wondering Which Way to Go", is from this period.

=== Discography ===
==== Albums ====
- Can't Keep It to Myself (1993, Shanachie Entertainment Corp.)
- Standing Here Wondering Which Way to Go (1971, Atlantic Recording Corp.)

=== Filmography ===
==== Film appearances ====
Williams opens the 1990 video Amazing Grace with Bill Moyers singing the signature song. Later in the PBS production, she stylized the song in her own way. In 1991, she performed as a gospel singer in the film Fried Green Tomatoes, though her scene is available only in the director's cut. The movie was dedicated to her.

==== Television appearances ====
On Hootenanny, a musical variety television show, she performed "Packin' Up" and "I've Got To Live The Life I Sing About In My Song" as Marion Williams and Stars of Faith. Williams also performed two songs on The Merv Griffin Show; during the appearance she and Griffin sang a duet of "He's Got the Whole World in His Hands". During this appearance she also discussed her international touring plans.

=== Music ===
Williams was known for having a broad vocal range and was able to sing a variety of notes while maintaining a steady volume and tone.

=== Influence ===
Williams' singing helped make the Ward Singers nationally popular when they began recording in 1948, and also inspired rock and roll pioneer Little Richard's signature wail.

"Mitchell and Williams Receive Kennedy Center Honors in December". Jet. 84 (22). Johnson Publishing Company: 36. September 27, 1993. ISSN 0021-5996.

== Honors and awards ==
Williams was honored by the MacArthur Foundation in 1993, stating that she was among "the last surviving links to gospel's golden age...one of the most versatile singers of her generation."

She was one of the recipients of the Kennedy Center Honors in 1993. Her tribute included an all-star lineup including appearances by Billy Preston, Little Richard, and Aretha Franklin.

== Personal life ==
Williams was an esteemed member and Church Mother at the BM Oakley Memorial Church of God in Christ in Philadelphia under the pastorate of the late Mother Irene A. Oakley.

Williams died at the Albert Einstein Medical Center in Philadelphia on July 2, 1994, aged 66. She was interred at Ivy Hill Cemetery in Philadelphia.
