= Sallie Martin =

American singer (1895–1988)

- The Mother of Gospel
- Born: November 20, 1895; Pittfield, Georgia, U.S.
- Died: June 18, 1988 (aged 92); Chicago, Illinois, U.S.
- Known for: The Sallie Martin Singers
- Spouse: Wallace Martin

Sallie Martin (November 20, 1895 – June 18, 1988) was an American gospel singer referred to as the "Mother of Gospel" for her efforts to popularize the songs of Thomas A. Dorsey and her influence on other artists.

== Biography ==
Martin was born in Pittfield, Georgia, on November 20, 1895, where she was raised as a Baptist. She joined the Pentecostal movement as a young woman. She began her career singing in Holiness churches after coming to Chicago in 1927.

Martin's rough-hewn singing style, combined with the enthusiastic physicality of the Holiness church, nearly kept her from working with Dorsey, who looked down on the shouting style of many Holiness singers and was reluctant to hire a singer who could not read music. Martin nonetheless persuaded Dorsey, after three auditions, to hire her as part of a trio he had formed to introduce his songs to churches. She proved to be an able organizer with a shrewd financial sense who marketed Dorsey's songs, organized his finances, developed new avenues for business and helped launch the National Convention of Gospel Choirs and Choruses, Inc. (NCGCC).

Martin was a successful artist in her own right, forming the Sallie Martin Singers, in which her daughter Cora Martin-Moore, Dinah Washington, then known as Ruth Jones, and Brother Joe May were featured, in 1940 after a dispute with Dorsey. She started her own publishing house, Martin and Morris Music, Inc., with Kenneth Morris (August 28, 1917 – 1988), a Gospel music publisher, arranger, composer, and innovator. They were responsible for publishing a number of gospel standards, including Just a Closer Walk With Thee (1940).

Martin retired from the Sallie Martin Singers in the mid-1950s as the strain of touring grew too great; the group continued on the road for several more decades. She remained an active force in the NCGCC even after she went out on her own and was a vocal supporter of Martin Luther King Jr. and of health programs in Nigeria. She remained a vigorous proponent of gospel music and defender of her role in bringing it to the churches, as her appearance in the 1982 movie Say Amen, Somebody illustrates vividly.

Martin was inducted into the Gospel Music Hall of Fame in 1991.

She died on June 18, 1988, in Chicago, Illinois.
