= Brian Wilson (disambiguation) =

Brian Wilson (1942–2025) was an American musician and co-founder of the Beach Boys.

Brian Wilson may also refer to:

== People ==
=== Sportspeople ===
- Brian Wilson (baseball) (born 1982), Major League Baseball pitcher
- Brian Wilson (Australian rules footballer) (born 1961), Brownlow Medal winner 1982
- Brian Wilson (footballer, born 1925) (1925–1984), Australian rules footballer for Geelong
- Brian Wilson (footballer, born 1957), English footballer (Newcastle United FC)
- Brian Wilson (footballer, born 1983), English footballer currently playing for Barrow A.F.C.
- Brian Wilson (poker player) (born 1967), bracelet winner at the 2005 World Series of Poker
- Brian Wilson (tennis) (born 1982), American tennis player
- Brian Wilson (NASCAR), American NASCAR crew chief

=== Other people ===
- Brian Anthony Wilson (born 1960), American film and television actor
- Brian Courtney Wilson, American gospel and CCM singer
- Brian Wilson (astrophysicist) (1930–2019), Australian astrophysicist and academic
- Brian Wilson (news correspondent) (born 1956), Washington, D.C. bureau chief and vice president of Fox News Channel
- Brian Wilson (Labour politician) (born 1948), British Labour Party politician and MP
- Brian Wilson (Northern Ireland politician) (born 1943), Green Party politician in Northern Ireland
- Brian Wilson (systems scientist) (born 1933), British academic, co-developer of soft systems methodology (SSM)
- Brian C. Wilson, professor of American religious history
- Brian Denis Wilson (1924–2024), British Army officer and colonial administrator in Hong Kong

== Music ==
- Brian Wilson (album), the debut solo album by the American musician
- "Brian Wilson" (song), a 1992 song referring to the musician, by Canadian rock band Barenaked Ladies

== See also ==
- Bryan Wilson (disambiguation)
- Bryon Wilson (born 1988), American skier
- Byron Wilson (born 1971), American basketball player
- Brian Willson (born 1941), peace activist, founding member of Veterans for Peace
