= Urgent! Records =

Urgent! Records was an American record label owned by Tim Whitsett, based in Jackson, Mississippi, United States, and distributed by the Atlanta-based Ichiban Records.

Label founder Whitsett produced albums for singer Jerry Butler and longtime associate Tommy Tate. The Butler album (Time and Faith) featured Chips Moman's American rhythm section, and both albums featured Whitsett's keyboardist brother Carson Whitsett, who wrote several songs for the projects.

Other artists with CD releases on Urgent! were The Dells, Roy Hytower, and three albums by Bobby Rush, whose I Ain't Studdin' You (URG 4117) in 1991 was the company's best seller and remains one of the artist's better known works.

The label's catalog was later incorporated into the works of The Malaco Music Group. Both Tim Whitsett and Bobby Rush then joined Malaco Records with Whitsett serving as Copyright Manager.

== See also ==
- List of record labels
