= I'm a Blues Man =

Studio album by Z. Z. Hill
- Released: 1983
- Genre: Blues; R&B; Southern soul
- Length: 35:06
- Label: Malaco
- Producer: Tommy Couch, Wolf Stephenson

Z. Z. Hill chronology
Velvet Soul (1982)	I'm a Blues Man (1983)	Bluesmaster (1984)

I'm a Blues Man is an album by the American musician Z. Z. Hill, released in 1983. Like Hill's previous albums, it is a mixture of blues, R&B, and Southern soul. I'm a Blues Man was among the 25 best selling Top Black Albums of 1984, and remained on that chart for almost a year; for a brief period, Hill's three 1982 and 1983 Malaco albums were on the chart at the same time. I'm a Blues Man was the last album released in Hill's lifetime.

== Production ==
The album was produced by Tommy Couch and Wolf Stephenson. The title track, which mentions Muddy Waters and Jimmy Reed, was written by Walter Godbold. Vasti Jackson played guitar on the album.

== Critical reception ==
Professional ratings
Review scores
Source	Rating
AllMusic	4/5 stars
Robert Christgau	B+
The Penguin Guide to Blues Recordings	2.5/4 stars
The Virgin Encyclopedia of R&B and Soul	3/5 stars

The Los Angeles Times noted that the album "employs a more pronounced Stax attack on Hill's typical assortment of cheating love songs". The Daily Herald said that Hill "never rises out of a larded grits-and-chitlins groove, but he's polished it until it shines like a diamond." Robert Christgau wrote that the songs were stronger than on Hill's previous Malaco album, The Rhythm and the Blues. The Lake Geneva Regional News called Hill "a link to the Southern tradition who shines on every song he sings". The Valley Advocate labeled Hill's music "red-clay soul", and listed I'm a Blues Man among the best "Black Pop" albums of 1984.

AllMusic opined that "Hill had indeed rechristened himself as a blues man of the first order."

== Track listing ==
I'm a Blues Man track listing
No.	Title	Length
1.	"I'm a Blues Man"	3:34
2.	"Three into Two Won't Go"	2:52
3.	"Cheatin' Love"	3:26
4.	"Shade Tree Mechanic"	2:57
5.	"It's Been So Long"	3:29
6.	"Get a Little, Give a Little"	4:12
7.	"Please Don't Let Our Good Thing End"	4:18
8.	"Steal Away"	4:09
9.	"Blind Side"	2:47
10.	"I Ain't Buying What You're Selling"	3:22
Total length:		35:06
