= Willie Banks (musician) =

- Born: May 11, 1929; Raymond, Mississippi
- Died: February 1, 1993 (aged 63); Jackson, Mississippi
- Genres: Gospel, traditional black gospel
- Occupation(s): Singer, songwriter
- Instrument(s): Vocals, singer-songwriter
- Years active: 1952–1993
- Labels: Malaco, Black Label / Peacock Universal Music Group / HSE Records
- Formerly of: The Messengers, The Jackson Southernaires, The Violinaires & Edna G. Cooke

Willie Banks (May 11, 1929 – February 1, 1993), was an American gospel singer, songwriter, and originator of his backing band, The Messengers.

Banks started the Messengers in 1972 after he left The Jackson Southernaires. While with the Jackson Southernaires, Banks made his first big hit in 1964 on Peacock Records with the song "Too Late". His first song with The Messengers in 1972 was "Heaven Must Be A Beautiful Place", also on Peacock Records. A String of "Chittlin Circuit" hits was released on HSE Records. His first major hit was "Things I Can't Change" in 1974. Another hit came in 1975 with "God's Goodness". His super hit was "For The Wrong I've Done" for which he was nominated for a Grammy in 1980. Perhaps Banks' most memorable song, "God Is Still In Charge" came in 1982 off of an album of the same name. Banks stayed with HSE Records until they changed their name to Black Label. Three projects were released on this label. Willie Banks moved over to Malaco Records in the mid-1980s. He penned "Look at the Blessings" in 1986 with Malaco. He would release thirteen albums, five of them placing on the Billboard magazine Top Gospel Albums chart: For The Wrong I Done (1978), Mother Why (1980), "Masterpiece" (1989), The Legend Lives On (1992) and 1993's The Best of Willie Banks, which was released posthumously.

== Early life ==
Banks was born on May 11, 1929, in Raymond, Mississippi, and his mother started him singing at five years. He help formed The Jackson Southernaires, a group to which he would come an go over a period of years, he did a brief few years with madam Edna G Cooke. In 1972 after leaving The Southernaires he would form his own group The Messengers. The group had a tragic accident on July 6, 1981, with their van careening down a 50-foot embankment near Atlanta, Georgia that killed one band member by the name of Willie "Bill" Badger of Yemassee, South Carolina, one of the Lead guitarists at the time. Banks was left to cling to life for several days before rescuers found him. Banks gave an account of the accident in a sermonette when he re-recorded his hit "God's Goodness" in 1982. This accident was the impetus for him and the band to sign with Malaco Records.

== Music career ==
Banks began his singing career with quartets. He sang with one of the earliest versions of The Violinaires of Detroit, Michigan prior to the arrival of Robert Blair. His most notable connection was with The Jackson Southernaires with whom he released the album "Too Late" on Peacock/Songbird Records in 1969. The album was a best seller for the group and after several singles and one side of the lp, "He's My Brother" on Songbird, Banks left the group to organize his own group.

He commenced his solo recording music career in 1972, with the release "Heaven Must Be A Beautiful Place" On Peacock Records. He signed with Malaco Records in 1985 with the release of Look at the Blessings.He would release twelve more albums with some being released posthumously, and two of these charted on the Billboard magazine Gospel Albums chart. The 1992 album, The Legend Lives On, placed on that particular chart at No. 19, while the 1993 album, Best of Willie Banks, placed at No. 40. He released albums with several labels including, Peacock Records, HSE Records, Sue-Ann Records, Malaco Records and Black Label Recordings.

== Personal life ==
Banks was married to Deliana Williams, sister of Huey and Frank Williams of The Jackson Southernaires and Melvin, Leonard and Doug Williams of The Williams Brothers. At the time of his death, he was married to Patricia Banks.

Banks was diagnosed with terminal cancer in 1990 and given six months. He died on February 1, 1993; his death was attributed to heart failure. He was buried at Garden Memorial cemetery in Jackson (Hinds County) MS.

== Discography ==
- Too Late (1964)
- Heaven Must Be A Beautiful Place (1973)
- The Things I Can't Change (1974)
- God's Goodness (1975)
- God Will Take Care Of His Own (1976)
- For The Wrong I've Done (1978)
- Show Me The Way (1979)
- Mother Why? (1980)
- God Is Still in Charge (1982)
- In The Name of Jesus (1983)
- The House of Prayer (1985)
- Look at the Blessings (1988)
- Masterpiece (1989)
- Willie Banks and the Messengers in Concert (1991)
- The Legend Lives On (1992)
- The Best of Willie Banks (1994)
