= Nashboro Records =

Nashboro Records was an American gospel label principally active in the 1950s and 1960s.

== History ==
Nashboro was founded in Nashville, Tennessee by Ernie Lafayette Young (1892-1977), who was the owner of a record store, Ernie's Record Mart, and sponsor of a weekly hit parade show on radio station WLAC. In 1951, Young founded Nashboro to issue gospel records, and the following year also created Excello Records to release secular music, especially R&B and blues acts.

Nashboro became a prolific issuer of Southern gospel groups, and Young frequently signed gospel acts from competing labels after they had folded. Some of the groups were backed by the Muscle Shoals Rhythm Section in the studio.

Young died in 1977, by which time Nashboro was increasingly reissuing out of its back catalogue rather than issuing new material. The label's catalogue was sold to AVI Entertainment in 1994, MCA Records in 1997, and Hip-O shortly thereafter. Relatively little of it has seen reissue, though in December 2013 Tompkins Square Records released a 4-CD compilation of Nashboro artists titled I HEARD THE ANGELS SINGING: Electrifying Black Gospel from the Nashboro Label, 1951-1983 (894807002981).

Nashboro was one of several labels to have its catalog of master recordings destroyed in the 2008 Universal fire.

== Artists ==
- The Angelic Gospel Singers
- The Barrett Sisters
- The Famous Boyer Brothers
- Alex Bradford
- J. Robert Bradley
- Brother Joe May
- Dorothy Love Coates
- The Consolers
- Edna Gallmon Cooke
- The Crescendos ("Oh Julie")
- The Dixie Nightingales
- Isaac Douglas
- The Fairfield Four
- Five Singing Stars
- The Gospel Harmonettes
- Bessie Griffin
- Pilgrim Jubilees
- The Radio Four
- Cleophus Robinson
- Silvertone Singers of Cincinnati
- Roscoe Shelton
- The Skylarks
- The Jewell Gospel Singers
- Gloria Spencer
- Earlston Ford
- Candi Staton
- Slim & the Supreme Angels
- The Swanee Quintet
- Sister Emma Tucker
- Willie Neal Johnson & The Gospel Keynotes
- Marvin Yancy
- Sister Lucille Pope & the Pearly Gates
- The Bright Stars
- Oscar Bishop

== See also ==
- Excello Records
