= Ollie Hoskins =

Ollie Hoskins may refer to:

- Ollie Hoskins, lead singer of The Dixie Nightingales
- Ollie Hoskins (rugby union), Australian rugby union player
