= Down Home (Z. Z. Hill album) =

Studio album by Z. Z. Hill
- Released: 1982
- Genre: Blues
- Label: Malaco
- Producers: Tommy Couch, Wolf Stephenson

Down Home is an album by the American blues musician Z. Z. Hill, released in 1982. "Down Home Blues", the album's first track, was a crossover hit, and is regarded as a blues standard. The song is said to be the best selling blues single of the 20th century.

The album peaked at No. 209 on the Billboard 200. It has sold more than 500,000 copies; for a time, it was Malaco Records' biggest seller.

== Production ==
Down Home was produced by Tommy Couch and Wolf Stephenson, and was recorded in Jackson, Mississippi. "Down Home Blues" was written by George Jackson.

== Critical reception ==
Professional ratings
Review scores
Source	Rating
AllMusic	5/5 stars
Robert Christgau	A−
The Clarion-Ledger	3/4 stars
The Encyclopedia of Popular Music	4/5 stars
MusicHound R&B: The Essential Album Guide	4/5 stars
The Penguin Guide to Blues Recordings	3/4 stars

Ron Wynn of The Boston Phoenix said that the album represented "red-clay soul at its peak, a memorable blend of country blues, R&B desire, and gospel conviction." The Clarion-Ledger noted the "enormous crossover possibility." Bill Bentley, in LA Weekly, called Down Home the best album of 1982. Living Blues wrote: "With all due respect to Robert Cray's greater success on the pop charts, Z. Z. Hill's 'Down Home Blues' is the most influential single blues recording of the '80s, and perhaps is the modern day blues anthem."

MusicHound R&B: The Essential Album Guide called Down Home "maybe the realization of [Hill's] life's work." AllMusic deemed it "one of the very few classic blues albums of the 1980s."

== Track listing ==
No.	Title	Length
1.	"Down Home Blues"	5:10
2.	"Cheatin' in the Next Room"	3:32
3.	"Everybody Knows About My Good Thing"	4:53
4.	"Love Me"	3:44
5.	"That Means So Much to Me"	3:53
6.	"When Can We Do This Again"	4:15
7.	"Right Arm for Your Love"	3:28
8.	"When It Rains It Pours"	3:37
9.	"Woman Don't Go Astray"	2:20
10.	"Givin' It Up for Your Love"	3:17
