= Franklin Delano Williams =

American gospel music singer (1947–1993)

- Also known as: Frank Williams; Frank D. Williams
- Born: Franklin Delano Williams; June 25, 1947; Smithdale, Mississippi, United States
- Died: March 22, 1993 (aged 45) Savannah, Georgia, United States
- Genres: Christian, Gospel music
- Years active: 1960s–1993
- Labels: Malaco Records; ABC/Dunhill Records

Franklin Delano Williams (June 25, 1947 – March 22, 1993) was an American gospel music singer.

== Musical career ==
As a child and during his early teens he joined the Southern Gospel Singers and later, The Williams Brothers.

=== The Jackson Southernaires ===
He teamed up with his brother Huey Williams in 1964, as part of The Jackson Southernaires. After their debut release, Too Late, they signed with ABC/Dunhill Records in 1972 and where they recorded Look Around and Save My Child. Later the Southernaires signed to Malaco Records. With Malaco they recorded Legendary Gentlemen (1979), Touch of Class (1981), and Down Home (1982). They won several awards during the 1980s. In 1979, while with the Jackson Southernaires, Frank became the executive producer and director of Gospel promotions at Malaco.

=== The Mississippi Mass Choir ===
Williams formed The Mississippi Mass Choir while serving as director of Gospel promotions at Malaco. With the company's support he began calling in personnel, including David R. Curry, who became Mississippi Mass Choir's music director. The choir's first album and video, The Mississippi Mass Choir, Live, were recorded on October 29, 1988 under the leadership of Williams.

Five weeks after this album was released, Billboard magazine licensed it as the Number 1 Spiritual album in America and it stayed on the Billboard charts for an uninterrupted 45 weeks, setting a new record for gospel recordings at that time. Williams and the choir recorded one live album with James Moore in 1991, with the choir recording another live album with Moore in 1995, two years after Williams died. At the 9th annual James Cleveland GMWA Awards, the Mississippi Mass won the Choir of the Year-Contemporary, and Best New Artist of the Year-Traditional. They also took home 4 Stellar Awards in 1989.

=== Later career and death ===
Williams continued working in the Gospel music industry until his death from a heart attack on Monday, March 22, 1993, in Savannah, Georgia at an airport on the way back from a concert. He was 45 years old. He had been suffering from a lung infection for about two years.
