= The Imperial Show Band =

The Imperial Show Band led by Tim Whitsett, was a popular musical group in the United States during the 1960s. The group is regarded as the first integrated band in the state of Mississippi.

== Early years ==
In 1960, while still a student at Murrah High School in Jackson, Mississippi, Tim Whitsett formed a musical combo called "The Imperial Show Band". Whitsett and his band-mates sold Christmas cards to finance the group's first recording sessions.

Along with his brother, Carson, and sister, Lucy, Tim continued to perform while a student at nearby Belhaven College. Tim was the manager and also played trumpet, harmonica, piano, organ and bass. Carson played organ, piano, French horn and trombone. Lucy played piano, organ and ukulele.

In 1964, Hank Martin and Buzz Aldridge, both natives of Sumter, South Carolina joined the group.

The band was signed to CBS Records in 1966 and recorded on the Epic Records label. Their first release under the contract was a "Sad Wing" and "Tia Maria," both written by Carson Whitsett.

Tim Whitsett's first record "Jive Harp" b/w "Pipe Dreams" was released on Imperial Records when he was sixteen years old. Heavily influenced by the sounds of nearby New Orleans, Tim Whitsett & The Imperials would become the most popular band in their home state of Mississippi upon its release. They released dozens of R&B, pop, and instrumental records, usually written by Whitsett or co-written with his brother Carson, which were issued on a variety of labels, including Epic, Whitsett's own Rim, and the Jackson label-based Ace, whose president Johnny Vincent was a mentor to Whitsett on his music business. Some of these were sizeable local hits throughout the South and became popular when pirated in England. These 45s are now considered collectables, and Tim Whitsett records sell for very high prices on websites like eBay.

The band became one of the first integrated musical acts to gain notoriety in the 1960s.

== Success ==
On the strength of Carson Whitsett's B-3 organ playing and the Tim Whitsett-led horn section, the group was asked to record for Stax Records (before there was a Booker T. & the MGs and "Green Onions") long before the company was a powerhouse. Later, Chips Moman asked the group to be his house band when he started his American Sound Studio. Tim Whitsett turned down both offers because he had his own label (Rim), publishing company (Gulfway), and the band was having their own success. Moman would hire session men like guitarist Reggie Young and record everyone from Wilson Pickett to Neil Diamond to Elvis Presley.

Whitsett changed the group's name to The Imperial Show Band, and the group began a successful tour of the country, which included stints in L.A., Lake Tahoe, New York, and a home away from home in Erie, Pennsylvania. With the addition of future southern soul cult figure Tommy Tate on vocals (and later drums as well), they became Tim Whitsett & The Imperial Show Band featuring Tommy Tate.

This was significant because other than Memphis's renowned Booker T. & the MGs (who were a house band first, usually regulated to working days and nights in the Stax studio), this made Whitsett's band one of the first, if not the only, integrated bands in the entire Southeastern United States at the time. Like a lot of white Southern musicians, the Whitsett brothers and their group were hugely influenced by two landmark albums: James Brown's Live at the Apollo and Bobby "Blue" Bland's Two Steps From the Blues. (Carson Whitsett would later play on several Bland albums, including his Live on Beale Street.) With the addition of Tate, they were more authentic than ever, and a force to be reckoned with. Also doing a brief stint with the band was Dorothy Moore of "Misty Blue" fame.

== Conclusion ==
Following lineup changes, Whitsett disbanded the group. Soon afterwards, he received a call from Don Davis who was now Vice President of Stax Records. Davis had heard demos on the group, including Tim Whitsett's "Get It Over Anyway" on Tommy Tate that was released in 2005 on the CD Troubled Waters: Deep Soul from the Deep South. Davis wanted them to augment The Bar-Kays, as well as the remaining MGs (Booker T. Jones had left the company), as another house band for the label and its recently greatly expanded roster. Tim Whitsett and Tommy Tate signed on as songwriters and within a week, Whitsett was put in charge of publishing. Carson Whitsett would come to Stax three years later and record an album as a member of The MG's, and Tate replaced Ollie Hoskins as the lead singer of The Nightingales.

In 2008, Goldmine Magazine's Top 10 Auction Sale Prices for records recently bought by record collectors listed Tommy & The Derby's "Handy Andy" b/w "Don't Play The Role" on the Swing label in 1966 at number five selling for $3,116.00. This is actually The Imperial Show Band with Tommy Tate. If sales of albums are excluded, Tommy & The Derbys ranks No. 3 on the list of most expensive records sold recently.

== Notable members ==
- Tim Whitsett - trumpet, harmonica, vocals, piano, harpsichord, percussion, bass (Publisher, producer, author)
- Carson Whitsett (keyboardist, songwriter, producer, and arranger)
- Tommy Tate (vocalist, drummer, called "America's best kept secret")
- Guitarists Murry Kellum (Carl Perkins, Grand Ole Opry); Bucky Barrett (Roy Orbison); and Jerry Puckett (Ricky Nelson, The Champs)
- Vocalists Buzz Aldridge and Hank Martin (the latter heard on many national jingles and theme song to popular '80s cartoon Thundercats)
- Drummers: Buddy Myers, Dulin Lancaster (Nancy Sinatra, Mississippi Fred McDowell) and artist Bill Dunlap. Also, Jimmy Hodo (Saxophone), the only group member with Tim Whitsett in every incarnation of the band.
- Bass players: Ronnie Kellum, Ed Clarke, Guy Bowering, Bennett Jennings.
