= Tim Whitsett =

Paul Timothy Whitsett Jr.
- Born: December 23, 1943; Jackson, Mississippi
- Died: January 15, 2022 (aged 78)
- Education: Bellhaven College
- Years active: 1960-1969
- Known for: Musician, bandleader, music executive and author

Tim Whitsett was an American music publisher, musician, songwriter, producer, author, and consultant. He was a founding member of the Imperial Show Band, a popular 1960s American musical group.

Whitsett is the author of multiple non-fiction books about the music business.

He is the elder brother of Carson Whitsett.

== Biography ==
Whitsett's instrumental "Jive Harp" b/w "Pipe Dreams" was released on Imperial Records when he was sixteen. With his band, The Imperials (later renamed The Imperial Show Band), he recorded over twenty singles in a variety of genres (R&B, Pop, Instrumental) for a number of labels, including Epic, Ace, Atlas, Capitol, Lowery, Sue, Island, Musicor and others, as well as for his own Rim Records.

In 1966, at the peak of tensions in Mississippi over civil rights, Whitsett introduced two new singers to his band, Tommy Tate and Dorothy Moore, both black, and both later to achieve chart acclaim as solo artists. Considering the times and possible repercussions, the band from Mississippi was extremely well received by both black and white southerners, as well as audiences in the Great Lakes, Las Vegas, Hollywood, Lake Tahoe, New York City and elsewhere.

Until disbanding the group in 1969, Whitsett wrote, produced, arranged, or played on numerous records for other artists, including The Vels, Peggy Scott & Jo Jo Benson, Huey "Piano" Smith & The Clowns, Bobby Marchan, Junior Parker, Paul Davis, Barbara Lynn, Sam Myers, Dorothy Moore and others.

Due to many personnel changes resulting from marriages and the military draft for the Vietnam War, Whitsett dissolved The Imperial Show Band. Shortly afterwards, in 1970, some demos the group had recorded ended up in the hands of noted producer Don Davis, who was then vice president of Stax Records. The MGs were breaking up. Booker T. Jones had just left the company, and Steve Cropper would soon follow. Davis wanted Whitsett’s band to augment The Bar-Kays as a second house band for Stax.

However, Whitsett's musicians had now scattered, joining other bands in other parts of the country. Davis then signed Whitsett and Tommy Tate as producer/songwriters. But within days of arriving at Stax, Whitsett was asked to take charge of the company’s music publishing division, East/Memphis Music Corp., which included works written or recorded by Otis Redding, Sam & Dave, Al Green, Isaac Hayes, Rufus Thomas and Booker T. & the MGs. During his years with Stax, Whitsett was the motivating force behind the releases of million sellers, such as "I've Been Lonely For So Long" (Frederick Knight), "I'll Play the Blues For You" (Albert King), and "Mr. Big Stuff" (Jean Knight), among others.

In 1976, Whitsett resigned as president of East/Memphis when offered the opportunity to run Chrysalis Music's European division in London. Six years later, he took another senior management position in London with Chappell Music, prior to its acquisition by Warner Music Group. He also forged a partnership with Chick Churchill, keyboardist with British rock group Ten Years After, in a record production and music publishing company, Whitsett Churchill Music.

At Chrysalis, then Chappell, Whitsett managed song catalogs that included works by David Bowie, Jethro Tull, The Chieftains, Irving Berlin, Cole Porter, Chuck Berry, George Gershwin, Rodgers and Hammerstein, etc.

In 1982, Whitsett set up a consultancy service for music publishers, which included specialized newsletters and target-marketing directories. Clients included EMI, Chappell, Gamble and Huff, Jobete, CBS Songs, Virgin, MCA, et al., as well as publishing companies owned by Paul McCartney, Michael Jackson and Elton John.

Returning to the States, Whitsett founded Urgent! Records. The label's roster included Bobby Rush, The Dells, Luther Ingram, Tommy Tate, and Jerry Butler.

The label was later folded into the Malaco Music Group, with whom Whitsett became associated in 1998. In addition to his work with Malaco Records, Whitsett authored three music-publishing textbooks and a dictionary of music business terms, while actively maintaining his consulting services for music publishers and copyright investors.

In 2008, Whitsett's Big Mistakes: The Memoirs of Tyrone Hatchback, a novel, was published. That same year, Whitsett founded LocoBop which started out as a digital only record label, but has since began to release physical CDs as well. Artists include, among many others, Ivory Joe Hunter, The Bar-Kays, Rufus Thomas, Eddie Floyd, Jerry Butler, The Masqueraders, Carla Thomas, and Luther Ingram.

Whitsett died on January 15, 2022.

== Books ==
The Dictionary of Music Business Terms (1998)

Music Publishing: The Real Road To Music Business Success (2000)

The Business of Music Publishing (2012)
