= Bryan Wilson =

Bryan Wilson may refer to:

- Bryan R. Wilson (1926–2004), British professor of sociology
- Bryan Wilson (sport shooter) (born 1962), Australian sport shooter
- Bryan Andrew Wilson (born 1981), American gospel musician and pastor

== See also ==
- Brian Wilson (1942–2025), American musician, singer, songwriter and record producer
- Brian Wilson (disambiguation)
