= Pilgrim Jubilees =

American traditional black gospel music group

- Also known as: The Pilgrim Jubilees; Pilgrim Jubilee Singers
- Origin: Houston, Mississippi; Chicago, Illinois
- Genres: gospel, black gospel
- Years active: 1934–present
- Labels: Nashboro, Peacock, Savoy, Malaco, MCA, Benson
- Members: Cleve Graham-Deceased Clay Graham- Deceased Bobby McDougal- Deceased Ben Chandler-Deceased Michael Atkins- Deceased Eddie Graham; Fred Rice
- Past members: Elgie Graham- Deceased Willie Johnson- Deceased Theophilles Graham- Deceased Monroe Hatchett- Deceased Leonard Brownlee; Major Roberson-Deceased Kenneth Madden; Richard "Rufus" Crume; Percy Clark; Roosevelt English- Deceased

The Pilgrim Jubilees, also known as The Pilgrim Jubilee Singers, was an American traditional black gospel music group originally from the cities of Jackson, Mississippi and Chicago, Illinois, where they were established by Elgie Graham and Willie Johnson, in 1934. The group have released 25 albums with six record labels Nashboro Records, Peacock Records, Savoy Records, Malaco Records, MCA Records, and Benson Records. Five of those albums charted on the Billboard magazine charts.

== Background ==
The Mississippi and Illinois-based traditional black gospel group, The Pilgrim Jubilees, were established in 1934 by Elgie Graham and Willie Johnson, as a duo at that time in Houston, Mississippi. They added three more members to the duo in 1946: Elgie's brother Theophilles Graham, Monroe Hatchett, and Leonard Brownlee. The Graham family settled in Chicago, Illinois, in 1950, where they added Major Roberson, Kenneth Madden and two more of Elgie's brothers, Cleve and Clay Graham, alongside Richard "Rufus" Crume, Percy Clark, and Roosevelt English. Elgie left the group in 1955, so he could retire and do other ministry. Madden and Crume also left the group during the 1960s, while they added Bobby McDougal in the late 1960s, and Ben Chandler and Michael Atkins in the early 1970s. They gained two more members during the 1990s: Eddie Graham, a cousin, and Fred Price.

The group is currently Cleve and Clay Graham, Bobby McDougal, Ben Chandler, Michael Atkins, Eddie Graham and Fred Price.

== History ==
The group has released 25 albums with six labels from 1952 to the present day. Those labels were Nashboro Records, Peacock Records, Savoy Records, Malaco Records, MCA Records, and Benson Records.

Their first recording contract was with Nashboro Records, where they made singles, and this gained them enough revenue to be an operable band, while they were originating out of two barbershops owned by Cleve and Clay.

Dave Clark heard the group in Atlanta, Georgia during the late 1950s, while he was a disc jockey for Peacock Records, the first label to release an album by the group, after they signed them in 1961.

Their first studio album, Walk Out, released in 1961, sold more than 100,000 copies. Soon thereafter, Rufus Crume left the group, becoming a member in The Soul Stirrers.

They released 24 more albums, with five of those charting on the Billboard magazine Gospel Albums chart: Gospel Roots at No. 19, Back to Basics at No. 28, Family Affair at No. 18, I'm Getting Better All the Time at No. 37, and In Revival at No. 31.

They also released two The Pilgrim Jubilees concert videos through Malaco Records: "Live in Jackson, Mississippi" in 1991 and ""Live" in Birmingham" in 1996.

== Members ==
Current

- Cleve Graham
- Clay Graham
- Bobby McDougal
- Ben Chandler
- Michael Atkins
- Eddie Graham
- Fred Rice

Former

- Elgie Graham (co-founder)
- Willie Johnson (co-founder)
- Theophilles Graham
- Monroe Hatchett
- Leonard Brownlee
- Major Roberson
- Kenneth Madden
- Richard "Rufus" Crume
- Percy Clark
- Roosevelt English
- Castro Coleman

== Discography ==
List of selected albums, with selected chart positions
Title	Album details	Peak chart positions
Title	Album details	US Gos
Gospel Roots	Released: 1987; Label: Malaco; CD, digital download	19
Back to Basics	Released: 1989; Label: Malaco; CD, digital download	28
Family Affair	Released: 1991; Label: Malaco; CD, digital download	18
I'm Getting Better All the Time	Released: 1993; Label: Malaco; CD, digital download	37
In Revival	Released: 1994; Label: Malaco; CD, digital download	31
