= Keith Pringle =

American gospel musician and organist (born 1952)

- Born: Roy Keith Pringle; August 6, 1952 (age 74); Detroit, Michigan
- Origin: Los Angeles, California
- Genres: Gospel, traditional black gospel, urban contemporary gospel
- Occupations: Singer, songwriter, organist
- Instruments: Vocals, singer-songwriter, organ
- Years active: 1977–present
- Labels: Savoy, Hopesong, Heartwarming, Muscle Shoals, Malaco, Platinum
- Member of: Pentecostal Community Choir

Roy Keith Pringle (born August 6, 1952) is an American gospel musician and organist, who is the founder of Pentecostal Community Choir. His first album, "Let Everything That Has Breath Praise the Lord", was released in 1979. He went on to release more albums with Savoy Records, Hopesong Records, Heartwarming Records, Muscle Shoals Records, Malaco Records, and Platinum Entertainment. Five of these albums would chart on the Billboard Gospel Albums chart. He received a Grammy Award-nomination for the song "Call Him Up" that was on the 1980 album "True Victory".

== Early life ==
Roy Keith Pringle was born on August 6, 1952, in Detroit, Michigan, who was reared in the Church of God in Christ, where at around sixteen years old the New Bethel Young People's Choir had him be their organist. He would graduate from Northwestern High School, and move to Chicago, Illinois for a time, then he would finally relocate to Los Angeles, California. He got his college education at Los Angeles City College, while attending Reverend James Cleveland's church the Cornerstone Institutional Baptist Church. Where he was requested to go with Rev. Cleveland to Philadelphia, Pennsylvania, after he got called forward to play the organ during one of the church's offertory periods. In September 1978, "No Ways Tired" was recorded live at the Salem Baptist Church in Omaha, Nebraska, and Pringle was requested by Rev. Cleveland to sing on the track. In the middle of one of the refrains, Cleveland said "Sing it for me Keith." Pringle ad libbed and the song was a success. It was a gold record and nominated for a Grammy.

== Music career ==
His music career as an act independent of Rev. Cleveland commenced in 1979 with the formation of the Pentecostal Community Choir, with the album, True Victory, that was released by Savoy Records, and it even got him a Grammy Award-nomination for the song "Call Him Up". The first album to chart, I Feel Like Going On, was released by Hopesong Records in 1983, and this placed upon the Billboard magazine Gospel Albums chart at No. 11. While his next album, Perfect Peace, was released in 1984 by Heartwarming Records, and this placed at No. 3 on the aforementioned chart. The subsequent album, All to You, was released in 1987 by Muscle Shoals, and this placed at No. 23 on the Gospel Albums chart. He released, No Greater Love, in 1989 by Savoy Records, and this was a chart topper on the aforementioned chart. The last album to chart, Magnify Him, was released by Muscle Shoals alongside Malaco Records in 1991, and this placed at No. 15 on the Gospel Albums chart.

== Discography ==
List of selected studio albums, with selected chart positions
Title	Album details	Peak chart positions
Title	Album details	US Gos
I Feel Like Going On	Released: 1982; Label: Hopesong; CD, digital download	11
Perfect Peace	Released: 1984; Label: Heartwarming; CD, digital download	3
All to You	Released: 1987; Label: Muscle Shoals; CD, digital download	23
No Greater Love	Released: 1989; Label: Savoy; CD, digital download	1
Magnify Him	Released: 1991; Label: Muscle Shoals/Malaco; CD, digital download	15
