= Sister Lucille Pope =

American gospel musician (1936–2025)

- Also known as: Sister Lucille Pope
- Born: Lucille Hall; January 12, 1936; Concord, Georgia, U.S.
- Died: September 26, 2019 (aged 83)
- Genres: Gospel, traditional black gospel
- Occupations: Singer, songwriter
- Instruments: Vocals, singer-songwriter
- Years active: 1964–2019
- Labels: Vee-Jay, Chess, Nashboro, Atlanta International
- Formerly of: The Pearly Gates

Sister Lucille Pope (January 12, 1936 – September 26, 2019) was an American gospel musician, and leader of The Pearly Gates. Her first album, Nancey Jackson, was released by Savoy Records in 1991. She released music as singles throughout the 1960s and 1970s, yet no albums were recorded. Her albums came out in the 1990s with Atlanta International Records, with The Great Reunion, being their only release to chart on the Billboard magazine Gospel Albums chart.

== Early life ==
Sister Lucille Pope was born in Concord, Georgia on January 12, 1936, as Lucille Hall, where she was the youngest child in the family of eight siblings. The Pearly Gates were formed in the 1960s by her and two of her brothers and a brother-in-law. The first iteration included her husband, Willie Pope, yet he died before they joined Nashboro Records in 1975, so her second husband, Louis Alexander, became part of the group.

== Music career ==
Their first recording was distributed locally in 1964, "Almighty God" with Lucille Pope as the lead singer, and a second single, "Early One Morning" with Larry Bivins in the leading role. This would get national exposure, when Vee-Jay Records put the songs out nationally. They would release a single with Chess Records in 1965, "Jesus Tore My Heart to Pieces", which was successful at radio. Nashboro Records would sign them in 1975, and release "Somebody's Gone", which was a ballad, yet the label would shortly be defunct. So, they picked up the pieces and joined Atlanta International Records in 1982. This would be the label that would release six albums from the group, with one of them charting, The Great Reunion, which was released on May 22, 1990. The album placed at No. 24 on the Billboard magazine Gospel Albums chart.

== Death ==
Pope died on September 26, 2019, at the age of 83.

== Discography ==
List of selected studio albums, with selected chart positions
Title	Album details	Peak chart positions
Title	Album details	US Gos
The Great Reunion	Released: May 22, 1990; Label: Atlanta International; CD, digital download	24
