= Carson Whitsett =

American keyboardist, songwriter, and record producer

- Born: May 1, 1945; Jackson, Mississippi, US
- Died: May 8, 2007 (aged 62) Nashville, Tennessee, US
- Occupation: Keyboardist
- Years active: 1960–2007
- Formerly of: The Imperials, The MG's, Malaco Rhythm Section
- Spouse: Kirsten Whitsett

James Carson Whitsett (May 1, 1945 – May 8, 2007) was an American keyboardist, songwriter, and record producer.

== Biography ==
Carson Whitsett was born in Jackson, Mississippi. He joined his older brother Tim's band, Tim Whitsett & The Imperials (later known as The Imperial Show Band) and quickly became a stand-out on the B-3 organ. Following the breakup of the band, Whitsett spent time in Canada playing with Eric Mercury before an invitation to Stax Records where Tim Whitsett was now in charge of the label's East Memphis publishing arm. Carson's playing inspired bassist Donald "Duck" Dunn and drummer Al Jackson Jr. to re-emerge, along with Stax session guitarist Bobby Manuel in place of Steve Cropper, as The MG's, releasing an album in 1973.

Whitsett moved to Malaco Records, where he played in the Malaco Rhythm Section with drummer James Stroud, bassist Vernie Robbins and guitarist Jerry Puckett, appearing on Paul Simon's There Goes Rhymin' Simon album, Anita Ward's "Ring My Bell", Dorothy Moore's "Misty Blue", albums by Connie Francis and fellow Mississippian Paul Davis, one of the highest selling blues albums in Z. Z. Hill's Down Home Blues, and numerous albums by others such as Bobby "Blue" Bland, Little Milton, and Johnnie Taylor. Several Malaco acts, including Taylor and Moore, recorded songs written by Whitsett, and he produced Fern Kinney's No. 1 UK hit, "Together We Are Beautiful" in 1980.

Whitsett's first major success as a songwriter also came in 1980 with a number one song on the Adult Contemporary chart (#18 Pop, #30 Country), J. Fred Knobloch's "Why Not Me". Lorrie Morgan requested on her debut album to record Whitsett's "Dear Me", which became her first top ten hit. Another country hit followed with John Anderson's "Mississippi Moon", co-written with Tony Joe White. With longtime collaborator and friend Dan Penn and Hoy Lindsey, Whitsett penned the title track to Solomon Burke's Grammy winning album Don't Give Up on Me, later covered by Joe Cocker and Susan Boyle. Actor Peter Gallagher performed the song on the hit television show, The O.C.

Other artists who recorded songs written or co-written by Carson Whitsett include Etta James, Eddie Floyd, Johnny Adams, James Carr, Ruth Brown, and Wilson Pickett, as well as country musicians Conway Twitty and Barbara Mandrell, plus gospel singers Albertina Walker and The Staple Singers. He also played and wrote material for B. B. King, Jerry Butler, Suzy Bogguss, and Irma Thomas, among others. At least two Carson Whitsett collaborations are considered modern day blues standards in Joe Louis Walker's "Blues of the Month Club" and the W.C. Handy Award winning "One Foot in the Blues" recorded by Johnny Adams.

In 2002, Whitsett served as arranger for Patti Page, on her Sweet Sounds of Christmas CD, and in 2006, played on Janis Ian's Folk Is the New Black. He teamed again with Dan Penn and Hoy Lindsey, writing a dozen songs, arranging, and playing on the Better to Have It album by Bobby Purify in 2005. He played on several Tony Joe White albums including The Heroines in 2004 with singers Lucinda Williams, Shelby Lynne, Jessi Colter, and Emmylou Harris and 2006's Uncovered, which featured guest appearances by Eric Clapton, J. J. Cale, Michael McDonald, Mark Knopfler, and also Waylon Jennings in one of his last performances.

For several years he served as keyboardist for Kathy Mattea and became friends with Mattea's husband, songwriter Jon Vezner. During this time, Whitsett also recorded three solo piano projects. In November 2005, he was interviewed along with Spooner Oldham in Keyboard Player Magazine.

Carson Whitsett died in Nashville, Tennessee, on May 8, 2007, of brain cancer. Dan Penn said of his collaborator of the past three decades that "he played with the most authentic R&B feel of anybody I ever worked with".
