= Willie Neal Johnson & The Gospel Keynotes =

Blues singer

Willie Neal Johnson (August 25, 1935 – January 10, 2001) was an American gospel singer, who became known as "Country Boy" for his rootsy blues-driven style and his down-to-earth, friendly personality. Growing up in a musical family, he was recruited as a teenager to sing with a gospel group. He later achieved recording and national fame with groups of musicians.

In 1964 he started his own group, "Willie Neal Johnson and the Gospel Keynotes." They toured in the Southwest and also produced records for Nashboro Records. They later signed with Malaco Records in Mississippi and changed their name in 1985 to "Willie Neal Johnson and the New Keynotes".

In 1999 the New Keynotes were inducted into the Gospel Music Hall of Fame in Detroit and the American Gospel Quartet Hall of Fame in Birmingham, Alabama.

== Biography ==
Willie Johnson was born in Tyler, Texas, in the northeast area of the state. He was the oldest of six children in a musical family. His mother Luretia immersed her children in music by taking them to church and encouraging their singing on Sundays. While in his teens, Johnson was tapped to join Rev. C. W. Jackson's group, the 'Five Ways of Joy Gospel Singers'.

In 1964 he formed his own group, "Willie Neal Johnson & the Gospel Keynotes", with long-time friends, Ralph McGee, Rev. J. D. Talley, Charles Bailey, John Jackson, Lonzo Jackson, and Archie B. McGee. After rising to popularity in performances across the Southwest, the group signed to Nashboro Records, based in Nashville, Tennessee. They scored a major hit with their original song "Show Me the Way". The Gospel Keynotes recorded more than 20 LPs for Nashboro.

Line-up changes were common in the group. Among the more notable talents who passed through the roster in the following years were: Paul Beasley, Larry McCowin, Donny Timmons, Alfred "Gino" Smith, Ermant Franklin Jr., Robert Williams, Jeffrey Newberry, Val Alexander, Rev. Charles McLean, Lonnie Hill, and Teddy Cross.

After Nashboro stopped producing new releases in about 1977, the group signed to Malaco Records, located in Jackson, Mississippi. In 1985 they changed their name to 'Willie Neal Johnson and the New Keynotes', with Lamanuel Boykin (keyboards), Maurice Morgan (guitar) and the Talley Brothers, Kenneth (KT) (guitar), Sheldon (bass guitar), and David (drums). With Malaco they recorded seven albums.

Johnson's last recording was an appearance on Kirk Franklin's The Rebirth of Kirk Franklin in 2000, on the song "Lookin' Out For Me."

Willie Johnson died of a stroke on January 10, 2001 at the age of 65 in Tyler, Texas. He was survived by his wife, Captoria, three sons, five daughters, and by his mother, Luretia.

== Legacy and honors ==
- In 1981 the Gospel Keynotes were nominated for a Grammy Award for Best Soul Gospel Performance, Traditional, for their cover of "Ain't No Stoppin' Us Now". This song was first released in 1979 as rock disco, written and performed by R&B songwriters McFadden and Whitehead.
- The New Keynotes were inducted into the Gospel Music Hall of Fame in Detroit, Michigan, and the American Gospel Quartet Hall of Fame in Birmingham, Alabama in 1999.

In 2017 Johnson was honored with a historical plaque in his hometown of Tyler, Texas. It was installed in the sidewalk designated as a 'Half Mile of History' in downtown, to recognize prominent people from the town.
