= Slim & the Supreme Angels =

- Origin: Milwaukee, Wisconsin
- Genres: Gospel, urban contemporary gospel, traditional black gospel, southern gospel
- Years active: 1953–2007
- Labels: Melendo, Nashboro, Black Label, Intersound, MCG, Gospel Jubilee, Malaco, Grammercy
- Past members: Rev. Howard "Slim" Hunt; Robert "Sugar" Hightower; Daniel "Scotty" Scott; Greg Kelly, Tom Ealey; Tommy Seymore; Poppa Hightower; Al Dent; Quincy King; Larry Young; Michael Kimpson; Maurice Robinson; Rev. Herman Pryor; Rev.Floyd Taylor; Earl Woods; Patrick Atkinson Sr. Michael Boykin; Rev. Shank Robinson; Junior Rideout

The Supreme Angels was an American traditional black gospel music group from Milwaukee, Wisconsin, United States. The Supreme Angels were formed in 1953 by several young ministers. In the 1960s Reverend Howard "Slim" Hunt of Walnut Grove, Mississippi, joined the group as the guitarist. Having been called to further their ministry, the ministers left the group to pastor various churches. Rev. Hunt decided to continue on as the now the lead singer of the group, changing the name of the group in later years to Slim & the Supreme Angels. As personnel changes continued throughout the years, Robert "Sugar" Hightower, of DeLand, Florida formerly of The Hightower Brothers and Mighty Clouds of Joy became the group guitarist and vocalist. The remaining group members of The Supreme Angels were Quincy King on vocals, Larry Young on vocals and keys, Michael Kimpson performing on vocals and bass, and Maurice Robinson on drums and vocals. They released seventeen albums over the span of 51 years, and the imprints they utilized were the following: Melendo Records, Nashboro Records, Black Label Records, Intersound Records, MCG Records, Gospel Jubilee, Malaco Records, and Grammercy Records. The group got three albums to place on the Billboard magazine Gospel Albums chart, and those were 1989's Death and the Beautiful Lady, 1995's Stay under the Blood, and 1996's Nobody but You.

== Background ==
The group had its origins in the agricultural world with Reverend Howard "Slim" Hunt, an African-American, growing up as the son of cotton farmers in Walnut Grove, Mississippi. At 17 years old, Hunt moved to New Orleans, Louisiana to take a job as a riverboat steamer, while residing with his sister at the time. This lasted only six months, before he relocated to Milwaukee, Wisconsin in 1953, where he resided with another one of his sisters, while he was working as a plumber. In 1956, Hunt was working as a candy maker, when he joined a local band, The Supreme Angels as their guitar player organized by several local ministers, Rev. Herman Pryor, Rev. Floyd Taylor and Brother Earl Woods. As the ministers in the group were called to pastor their own churches they left the group and Reverend Hunt continue on with the group, eventually including guitarist and vocalist, Robert "Sugar" Hightower, vocalist, Gregory Kelly, and vocalist(tenor) Patrick Atkinson Sr, Michael Boykin, vocalist and keyboards. Other Members include vocalist and keyboardist Quincy King, keyboardist and vocalist, Larry Young, bass guitarist and vocalist, Michael Kimpson, and drummer and vocalist, Maurice Robinson. Hunt would found the Deliverance Temple in 1986, where he was the pastor, which was located in Dillon, South Carolina and later the Deliverance Temple Church of God in Christ in Goldsboro. N.C. He continued to tour and preach until his death in Goldsboro, N.C. on February 25, 2007 after which Robert "Sugar" Hightower took over leadership of the group. Robert Lee Hightower died on August 24, 2010, also in Goldsboro, N.C.

== History ==
The group released seventeen albums with various labels from 1956 until 2007, and the labels they released albums with were the following: Melendo Records, Nashboro Records, Black Label Records, Intersound Records, MCG Records, Gospel Jubilee, Malaco Records, and Grammercy Records. They got three of those albums to chart on the Billboard magazine Gospel Albums chart, and those were 1989's Death and the Beautiful Lady at No. 14, 1995's Stay under the Blood at No. 16, and 1996's Nobody but You at No. 36.

== Members ==
- Reverend Howard "Slim" Hunt (December 13, 1934 — February 25, 2007) – vocals
- Robert "Sugar" Hightower (December 17, 1948 — August 24, 2010) – guitar, vocals
- Greg Kelly – vocals
- Daniel (Scotty) Scott - (1942-1991)
- Patrick Atkinson Sr. – vocals
- Michael Boykin – vocals and Keyboard
- Michael Kimpson – bass guitar, vocals
- Quincy King – keyboard
- William Manning – vocals
- Rev Floyd Taylor - vocals
- C.D. Hall - vocals
- Al Dent – guitar
- Kevin Wilson - guitar
- Kevin Cloud - bass guitar
- Joey Williams - guitar
- Bob Evans - keyboards
- Tom Eaddy
- Tommy Seymore (September 1, 1943 – April 4, 2010) – vocals
- Rev Shank Robinson (November 11, 1939 - May 10, 2020) Lead Vocals
- JR Rideout - Tenor

== Discography ==
List of selected albums, with selected chart positions
Title	Album details	Peak chart positions
Title	Album details	US Gos
Death and the Beautiful Lady	Released: 1989; Label: Melendo; CD, digital download	14
Stay under the Blood	Released: 1995; Label: Intersound; CD, digital download	16
Nobody but You	Released: 1996; Label: Intersound; CD, digital download	36
