= James Moore (singer) =

The Reverend James Moore
- Born: February 1, 1956
- Origin: Detroit, Michigan
- Died: June 7, 2000 (aged 44) Memphis, Tennessee
- Genre: Gospel music
- Occupation: Gospel singer
- Instruments: Vocals, Piano, Organ
- Years active: 1973–2000
- Labels: States, Malaco

James Leslie Moore Sr. (February 1, 1956 – June 7, 2000) was an American gospel singer, minister, and musician. His career was considered "the standard" for Gospel Music in the late 1980s and 1990s, winning and being nominated for Stellar and Grammy Awards.

== Career ==
In his early days, Moore was under the tutelage of a woman by the name of the late Elma Hendrix Parham. She later introduced him to Gospel music legends and personal friends, primarily from the Church of God in Christ, such as the late Dr. Mattie Moss Clark, the late Rev. James Cleveland, and Andraé Crouch, among many others, thereby contributing to his musical expertise & artistic craft.

After the much experience in music & performance that Moore had since he was a youth, he later took his foot into the music industry himself, under Savoy Records, releasing his debut album, "Thank You Master", in January of 1974, at the age of seventeen. He also gave much acclaim to the late Parham, the Church of God in Christ and the Gospel Music Workshop of America (GMWA) for the molding of his gospel music career.

After many chart-topping gospel hits and much-noted success in the 1980s and early 1990s, Moore became a household name among many gospel music listeners. He found mainstream success in the music industry, after his "Live" debut in 1988, under Malaco Records, and also recorded two live albums, in 1990 and 1994, with The Mississippi Mass Choir, including singing duets with one of the figures of the Gospel division of Malaco Records and co-founder of the choir; Franklin Delano Williams on the 1990 album, "Live with the Mississippi Mass Choir." This would be a turning point for Moore, his music, and his musicality. Moore also featured on many records & albums of colleagues during the 80s and 90s, either singing alongside or contributing to the composition or arrangement side of their records.

He also worked with singer LaShun Pace in the early 90s.

== Later years and illnesses ==
Rev. James Moore, in his youth, suffered from juvenile diabetes, which progressed into type 1 diabetes overtime. In 1992, he confessed on his album, "Live in Detroit," how he was said to have had a sugar count of 690. In 1993, Rev. Moore had experienced considerably-tremendous grief of the death of Frank Williams, who died in March 1993. Rev. Moore believed that this effected him, and while in grief, he was diagnosed with colon cancer. The cancer diagnosis was explained on the record "I Will Trust In The Lord... ." Rev. Moore eventually recovered from the cancer, and he recorded a new record with Mississippi Mass in May 1994 at Jackson State University, which was done over one year after Frank Williams died. The subsequent months after the concert recording, Rev. Moore experienced and was diagnosed with kidney failure during October to November 1994, which had been claimed to have been connected to an outgrowth of diabetes. With time progressing during the following months, he was required to be placed on dialysis three times a week, and the complications of the illnesses had led to the frequent use of a wheelchair and medical cane. After the successful and prolonged release of Live At Jackson State University in February 1995, he had begun to go blind by that May. The blindness progressed over time, which also prompted him to use blind cane too, in notable occurrences. Rev. James Moore still continued his career when considered "able."

In late 1995, Rev. Moore served in the role of co-founder of the Colorado Mass Choir, eventually having Joe Pace installed of conductor and director. In January 1996, Rev. Moore served as guest on "Jesus Paid It All" on the Mississippi Mass Choir live recording of, I See You In the Rapture. In September that year, he served as guest at the "Hattie B's Daughter" recording with Dorothy Norwood. He would be seen ministering at the COGIC Convocation that November.

After the period of working with other gospel figures, Rev. Moore returned to his own catalog of records with "It Ain't Over (Till God Says It's Over)" being recorded on his forty-first birthday in 1997 in Pittsburgh, Pennsylvania, and released that summer. Precisely two years after the live recording of the previous record, brought along his last album entitled "Family and Friends, Live from Detroit", which was recorded in February 1999 on his forty-third birthday in his hometown of Detroit, with notable Industry and Gospel music notables, such as Vanessa Bell Armstrong, Rudolph Stanfield Jr., and Darius Twyman. The album was released in March 2000. While his health continued to deteriorate in 2000, he sung lead on Thank You by The Ingrams, which was released in November 2001 on the record "Southern Cooking." This was the final recorded song of Rev. Moore, shortly before he died at the age of 44. Certain availably-online sources had noted, how Rev. Moore died of Pneumonia while recovering from a recent cold, however, other sources attributed his death to Diabetes and Kidney Failure.

== Personal life ==
In 1987, Moore was married to a woman named Karen before his marriage declined, and he filed for divorce in 1989 due to his wife's infidelity. He remained a single father of three children. Moore is survived by three children: his daughter Tamara Moore and his two sons, Armel Moore and James Moore Jr. Moore also has six other children, who are his nieces, nephews, and stepchildren, who are mentioned on the back cover of his final album, "Family and Friends: Live from Detroit".

== Awards ==
Rev. Moore received several awards and accolades, including a Stellar Award for Best Male Solo Performance and three Grammy Nominations. He also won several awards from the GMWA and a Dove Award.

== Discography ==
Moore’s albums include;

- Thank you Master (1974)
- Brothers and Sisters, I will be praying for you (1981)
- He looked beyond my faults and saw my needs (1982)
- God can do anything (1985)
- Something old and something new (1987)
- Live (1988)
- Reverend James Moore with the Mississippi Mass Choir (1990)
- Live in Detroit (1992)
- I will trust in the Lord (1993)
- Reverend James Moore with the Mississippi Mass Choir: Live at Jackson State University (1995)
- It ain’t over (till God says it’s over) (1997)
- Live from Detroit (2000)
