= Song Bird Records =

- Parent company: Duke/Peacock Records (1963-1973); ABC Records (1973-1979)
- Founded: 1963
- Defunct: 1979
- Status: Defunct
- Genre: Gospel music
- Country of origin: United States

Song Bird Records (also known as SongBird Records) was started at the end of 1963 as a gospel music subsidiary of Houston, Texas-based Duke/Peacock Records. Significant artists on Song Bird included the powerful contralto Inez Andrews formerly of The Caravans, The Gospelettes with Liz Dargan formerly of The Andrewettes, mixed-vocal group The Kansas City Melodyaires later known as Mildred Clark & The Melodyaires, The Dallas Academy Youth Choir, The Jackson Southernaires along with their younger siblings The Williams Brothers, Reverend Oris Mays, and the Christian Harmonizers.

Song Bird also featured the one-off album, It's Gospel Time, by The Sons of The Birds, being the sons of the famous Peacock group, The Dixie Hummingbirds. Andrews scored a small hit on the rhythm and blues singles charts in April 1973 with the title track of her album, Lord Don’t Move The Mountain. That same year, the Duke/Peacock family of labels ‒ which also included Back Beat and Sure Shot ‒ was sold to Los Angeles, California-based label, ABC Records, with ABC label founder, Don Robey, staying with ABC as a consultant until his death in 1975. In 1974, Song Bird's label name was changed to ABC/Songbird.

After ABC was sold to MCA Records in 1979, MCA briefly operated an MCA/Songbird label with new signings including Little Anthony of Little Anthony & The Imperials and Dan Peek formerly of the group, America, the previous rosters of both ABC/Peacock and ABC/Songbird having been dropped. MCA would later reissue several Peacock and Song Bird/Songbird albums. Along with the MCA back catalog, the Peacock and Song Bird masters are now controlled by the Geffen Records unit of Universal Music Group.

== See also ==
- List of record labels
