= Ruby Terry =

Pastor/Evangelist Ruby Terry
- Also known as: Pastor Ruby Terry
- Born: Ruby Karen Frances; Ruby Karen Francis; 1952 (age 73–74); Columbia, Mississippi, United States
- Origin: Lawton, Oklahoma; Lake Charles, Louisiana
- Genres: Christian R&B, gospel, R&B, soul, traditional black gospel, urban contemporary gospel
- Occupations: Singer, songwriter
- Instruments: Vocals, singer-songwriter
- Years active: 1990–present
- Label: Malaco

Pastor Ruby Terry (born February 1952 as Ruby Karen Frances or Ruby Karen Francis) is an American gospel musician and Christian R&B artist. She started her music career, in 1990 with the release of Chapter One by Malaco Records, and all of her released have been released by that label. Her second album, Live with the Southwest Louisiana Mass Choir, was released in 1992, and it was her breakthrough release upon the Billboard magazine Gospel Albums chart. The third album, What a Time, came out in 1994, and this release charted on the aforementioned chart. She released, God Can Do It, in 1996, yet this failed to chart.

== Early life ==
Pastor Terry was born in Columbia, Mississippi, in February 1952 as Ruby Karen Francis or Frances, to Rev. L. J. Francis, and his wife. She was raised in Lawton, Oklahoma, where she was a graduated of Eisenhower High School, and went on to earn 119 hours of an education degree at Seward County Community College and Wichita State University.

== Music career ==
Her music recording career commenced in 1990, with the release of Chapter One by Malaco Records, and they are the only imprint she released albums with during her career. The second album, Live with the Southwest Louisiana Mass Choir, was released in 1992, and this was her breakthrough released upon the Billboard magazine Gospel Albums chart at No. 11. She released, What a Time, in 1994, and this placed on the aforementioned chart at No. 39. The fourth album, God Can Do It, came out in 1996, yet this album failed to chart.

== Personal life ==
Evangelist Terry met her husband, Pastor Ivanhoe Terry, while she was in pursuing her degree in education, and they relocated to Lake Charles, Louisiana. She has two sons, Eric and Christopher Terry. After the death of her husband, Evangelist Terry became the Founder/Pastor of Fountain of Life COGIC in Lake Charles. She serves as Assistant Jurisdictional Supervisor of the Greater New Orleans Jurisdiction, COGIC.

== Discography ==
=== Studio albums ===
List of studio albums, with selected chart positions
Title	Album details	Peak chart positions
Title	Album details	US Gos
Chapter One	Released: 1990; Label: Malaco; CD, digital download	–
Live with the Southwest Louisiana Mass Choir	Released: 1992; Label: Malaco; CD, digital download	11
What a Time	Released: 1994; Label: Malaco; CD, digital download	39
God Can Do It	Released: 1996; Label: Malaco; CD, digital download	–
