= Tommy Tate (musician) =

American singer and songwriter (1945–2017)

Background information
- Born: Thomas Lee Tate; September 29, 1945; Homestead, Florida, U.S.
- Died: January 20, 2017 (aged 71) Jackson, Mississippi, U.S.
- Genres: Soul
- Occupations: Singer, songwriter
- Years active: Late 1950s–2002
- Labels: KoKo, Malaco, Urgent!, Sundance, others

Thomas Lee Tate (September 29, 1945 – January 20, 2017), known as Tommy Tate, was an American soul singer and songwriter, who had three hits on the R&B chart in the 1970s.

== Biography ==
Born in Homestead, Florida and raised in Jackson, Mississippi, Tate began his career in his early teens as a drummer and singer. He made his first recordings on the Rise label in 1964. He recorded for several smaller labels during the 1960s, on many of which he was backed by the Imperial Show Band led by Tim Whitsett. He toured widely with the band, which also included singer Dorothy Moore, and after Moore left he became the band's featured vocalist.

After the band split up, Tate recorded for Stax Records in 1970 as a member of The Nightingales. In 1972 he started recording for KoKo Records, distributed by Stax, and had his first and biggest chart hit with "School of Life", produced by Johnny Baylor, which reached number 22 on the Billboard R&B chart. He remained with KoKo for several years, and had two further minor chart hits in 1976, "Hardtimes S.O.S." (No. 62 R&B) and "If You Ain't Man Enough" (No. 93 R&B). In 1979, he joined Malaco Records and released the album Hold On. A second album recorded at the Malaco studios, Tommy Tate, was issued on the Juana label in 1981.

Tate also wrote songs recorded by Luther Ingram, Bobby Bland, Johnnie Taylor, Isaac Hayes, Little Milton and others. He continued to perform in clubs and to record for small Southern soul labels, and released a third album, Love Me Now, on the Ichiban subsidiary label, Urgent!, in 1990. His career ended in 2002 when he suffered a debilitating stroke.

In 2007, Kent Records issued a compilation of his work, The Complete KoKo Recordings And More.

Tommy Tate died in 2017 in Jackson, Mississippi, at the age of 71.
