= Bryan Andrew Wilson =

American gospel musician (born 1983)

Bryan Andrew Wilson (Singer / Actor)
- Born: Bryan Andrew Wilson; November 3, 1983 (age 42); Danville, Illinois
- Origin: Washington, D.C.
- Genres: CCM, gospel, traditional black gospel, urban contemporary gospel, Christian Rock, Christian alternative rock, praise & worship
- Occupations: Singer, songwriter, organist
- Instruments: vocals, singer-songwriter
- Years active: 1996–present
- Labels: Malaco, Central South, Bryan's Songs
- Website: bryanwilson.com

Bryan Andrew Wilson (born November 3, 1983) is an American gospel musician. He calls his music "spiritual soul" because it combines the passion of faith with the sound of R&B. Wilson began his career as a child gospel star, belting out "His Eye is on the Sparrow" with the Mississippi Children's Choir in the 1990s. After nearly a decade away from the music business, Wilson resurfaced in 2008 with an adult R&B-flavored style of urban inspirational gospel music that has proven successful with his recent Billboard Magazine chart hits, "Turning Away" (2014) and "Overflow" (2016). Billboard magazine Gospel Albums chart.

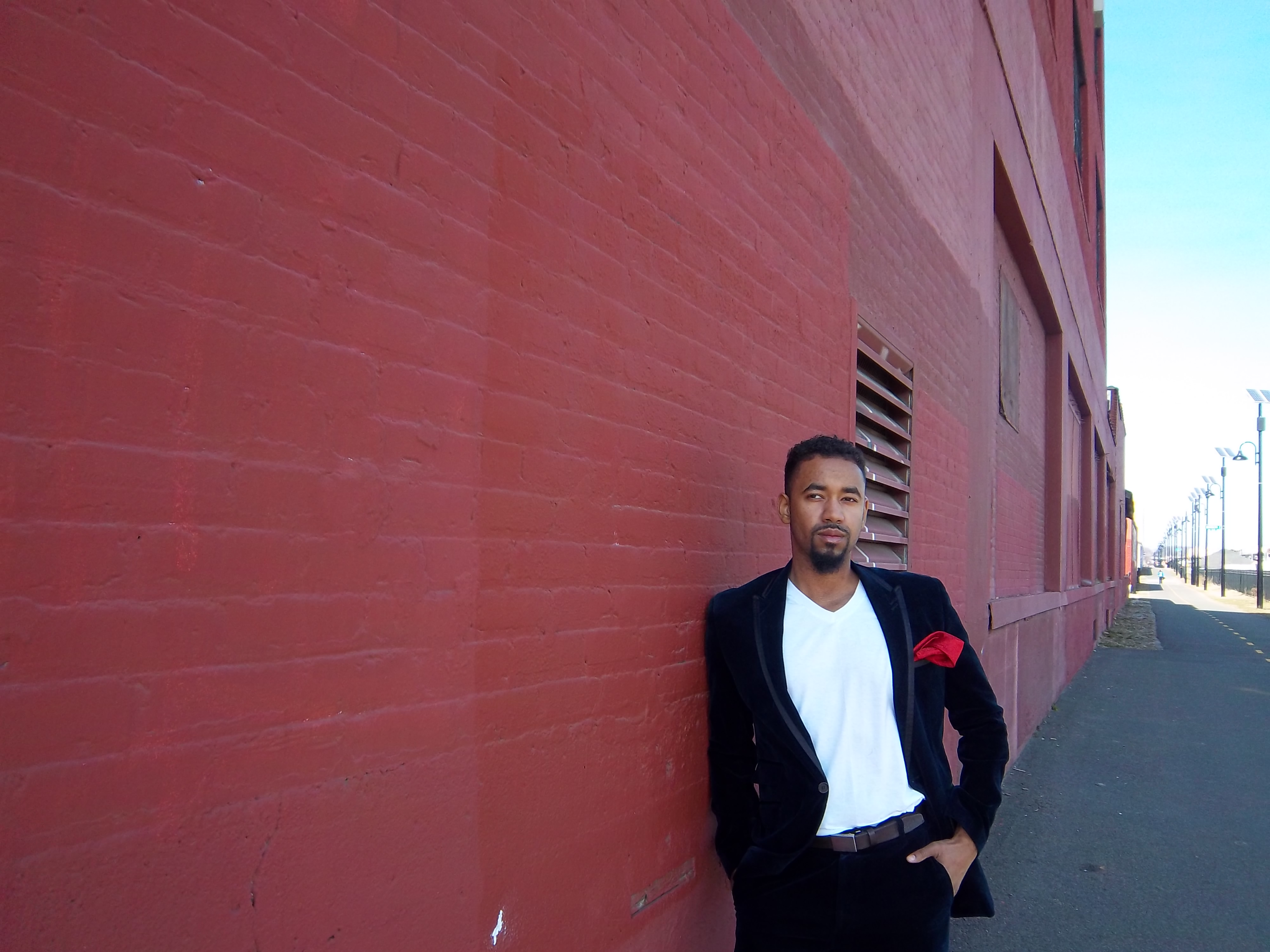
Bryan Andrew Wilson taking a photo on the Metropolitan Branch Bike Trail in N.E. Washington, D.C. on September 21, 2012.

== Early life ==
Wilson was born Bryan Andrew Wilson in Danville, Illinois, on November 3, 1983, to Sheila Davis Wilson and Beau Briggs. Wilson came into prominence when he led the song "His Eye is on the Sparrow" with the Mississippi Children's Choir when he was young. The song was featured on the live recording "A New Creation," which sold 100,000 units in 1995. The YouTube videos of Wilson performing the song have amassed more than three million views, and the success led to a recording deal with Malaco Records. His debut album, "Bryan's Songs," was produced by gospel legends such as Kirk Franklin, John P. Kee, and Walter Hawkins. The album earned Wilson the Dove Award and Stellar Gospel Music Award nominations. He performed his radio single, "Blessed Assurance," to a standing ovation on the Stellar Awards in 1997. After his voice changed, Wilson temporarily lost his upper vocal range. "I remember going places and they would want me to sing in certain keys, and a couple of times some audiences, even though I was a teenager, they booed me." Frustrated, Wilson figured his singing days were behind him, so he left music and enrolled in college. He graduated from Claflin University during their May 2004 commencement ceremony with a bachelor's degree in Religion and Philosophy. Subsequently, he went onto Princeton Theological Seminary, where he studied for a year. By 2008, Wilson had returned to music with his third solo album, "A Second Coming." It received a rave review from Billboard Magazine's gospel editor, Gordon Ely, but the Dallas Morning News' reporter, Selwyn Crawford, was less enthusiastic. "It's a nice effort, but much of the CD sounds like what it is—a former star trying to reinvent himself. Too bad that Bryan Wilson's `second coming' is not the one we're looking for."

== Music career ==
After seven years of trying to find a new musical footing, Wilson finally hit pay dirt in 2014 with the release of the haunting ballad, "Turning Away." It reached No. 15 on Billboard Magazine's Gospel Airplay chart and No. 21 on its Hot Gospel Songs chart. "My message is gospel, but I'm singing from my soul, my experience," he told The Clarion Ledger's Jacob Threadgill in an interview. "If you hear a crack in my voice, it is because of the pain that I had to go through." It anchored his fifth album, "The One Percent." The project featured a variety of musical styles. He gave Ben E. King's 1961 classic, "Stand by Me," a Caribbean dance flavor, and he injected Jesus Culture's epic tune, "Show Me Your Glory" with a shot of gospel energy and fused it with a festive rendition of Will Reagan's "Set A Fire." An ASCAP editor wrote of the album that, "Wilson blends a mix of modern soul, funk and gospel styles in songs full of infectious arrangements and personal lyrics. This passionate and vibrant recording is a testament to gospel music's enduring power and growth." Wilson continued his musical comeback with "Overflow (Let Your Spirit)," which features the group Roderick Giles & Grace on background vocals. It reached No. 12 on Billboard Magazine's Gospel Airplay chart, No. 20 on its Hot Gospel Songs chart and No. 1 on its Gospel Recurrent chart in the summer of 2016. The upbeat track earned Wilson his first Stellar Gospel Music Award nominations since his teenage years. It was nominated in the categories of Traditional Male Vocalist of the Year and Best Duo/Group of the Year.

Wilson's latest radio single, "Whoa!," is an inspirational, feel-good track. In the Journal of Gospel Music, editor Bob Marovich writes that, "Wilson opens 2017 with a well-crafted single whose message of encouragement is a life saver in the midst of a swirling rapid...`Whoa!' is a fine follow up to `Overflow' and much closer to `Turning Away' in appeal. Check out Bryan's crystalline high notes at the end."

== Albums/EPs ==
List of studio albums, with selected chart positions
Title	Album	Billboard Gospel Albums Chart	Peak chart positions
Title	Album	Billboard Gospel Albums Chart	Billboard Top Singles
This Time	Released: 2019; (Bryan's Songs/CE Music)	–	2
Overflow	Released: 2016; (Bryan's Songs/CE Music)	–	–
The One Percent	Released: 2014; (Bryan's Songs/CE Music)	19	–
Limited Edition	Released: 2012; (Bryan's Songs/CE Music)	–	–
A Second Coming	Released: 2008; (Bryan's Songs/CE Music)	–	–
Growing Up	Released: 1999; Label: Malaco	–	–
Bryan's Song's	Released: 1996; Label: Malaco	14	–
A New Creation	Released: 1995; Label: Malaco; (w/The Mississippi Mass Choir)	12	–

== Radio Singles ==
Year	Single	Peak chart positions									
Year	Single	Billboard Gospel Airplay	Billboard Hot Gospel Songs	Mediabase Gospel Airplay Recurrent	Mediabase Gospel Airplay	Mediabase R&B Airplay	Nielsen BDS Gospel Activity	Nielsen BDS Smooth Jazz Activity	Mediabase Smooth AC Chart	Billboard Gospel Airplay Audience	Billboard Recurrent Gospel Airplay
2022	The Ride	5	21	1	8	60	—	—	—	—	—
2020	"With Every Beat of My Heart"	24	—	—	23	—	—	—	—	—	—
2019	"This Time"	27	—	—	26	—	—	—	—	—	—
2019	"Only You"	—	—	—	—	—	—	25	16	—	—
2018	I Put You First	27	—	23	—	—	—	—	—	—	—
2017	"Whoa!"	20	—	—	17	—	—	—	—	—	—
2016	"Overflow (Let Your Spirit)"	12	20	—	14	—	—	—	—	—	1
2015	"Show Me Your Glory"	—	—	—	53	—	36	—	—	—	—
2015	"Faithful God"	30	—	—	52	—	31	—	—	30	—
2014	"Turning Away"	15	21	16	—	79	—	—	—	—	—
2013	"It Will Happen For Me"	—	—	—	98	—	86	—	—	—	—
2012	"Expect You Now"	—	—	—	—	—	66	—	—	—	—
2012	"Everybody Clap Your Hands"	—	—	—	—	—	38	—	—	—	—
"—" denotes releases that did not chart or not released to that country
