= Angelic Gospel Singers =

American gospel group (1944–2008)

The Angelic Gospel Singers were an American gospel group from Philadelphia founded and led by Margaret Wells Allison. The group continued through Allison's death in 2008; the group was called "the longest consistently selling female gospel group in African American history" by the Encyclopedia of American Gospel Music.

Allison and her sister, Josephine McDowell, formed the group in 1944 along with two friends, Ella Mae Norris and Lucille Shird, who had sung with Allison in the group Spiritual Echoes of Philadelphia. The group toured extensively on the East Coast and central United States in the 1940s and 1950s and signed a recording contract with Philadelphia-based Gotham Records in 1947. Their recording "Touch Me, Lord Jesus" was a hit on R&B stations in 1949 and sold over a million records. They recorded several songs with the Dixie Hummingbirds and toured with them as well. In 1955 Gotham Records shut down due to an impending tax evasion charge; the group signed with Chess Records and recorded an album, but their contract was soon after bought out by Nashboro Records, the label which released the Angelic's output until 1982.

In 1961 the group added its first male member, Thomas Mobley, and released several albums through the late 1960s, increasing their output on Nashboro in the late 1970s with an album a year. In the following decade they moved to Malaco Records, who issued their albums through the 1990s. During this time the group began crediting themselves as Margaret Allison & the Angelic Gospel Singers. They returned to the Billboard charts in the late 1980s, when their albums I've Got Victory reached #26 on the Gospel Albums chart in 1986 and Out of the Depths reached #28 in 1987.

The Angelic Gospel Singers continued performing and touring through the mid-2000s. Margaret Allison's death on July 30, 2008 marked the end of the group's run. Bernice Cole died in 2006 at the age of 85.

== Members ==
- Margaret Wells Allison (1944-2008)
- Josephine Wells McDowell (1944-2008)
- Ella Mae Norris (1944-1955)
- Lucille Shird (1944-1953)
- Bernice Cole (1951-1956, 1975-2006)
- Thomas Mobley (1961-1973)
- Geraldine Morris (1973-1974)
- Pauline Turner (1982-)
- Darryl Richmond (bass guitar, vocals 1984-)
- John Richmond (drums, 1984- )
- Francis Shorty Leggett (guitar, 1988- )
- Teresa Burton (vocals, 1985- )

== Discography ==
Albums

- 1961: My Sweet Home
- 1964: Songs From The Heart
- 1967: The Best Of The Angelic Gospel Singers
- 1968: Jesus Paid It All
- 1970: Somebody Saved Me
- 1974: Jesus Will Never Say No
- 1975: I'm Bound For Mount Zion
- 1977: Gotta Find A Better Home
- 1978: Margaret, Josephine And Bernice
- 1979: Come Over Here
- 1979: Together 34 Years
- 1980: The Best Of The Angelic Gospel Singers Vol 2
- 1981: I'll Go With You
- 1982: Touch Me Lord Jesus
- 1983: Don't Stop Praying
- 1984: Rejoice: Best Of The Angelic Gospel Singers
- 1984: The Early Years
- 1984: 40 Years
- 1986: I've Got Victory
- 1987: Out Of The Depths
- 1989: Lord You Gave Me Another Chance
- 1992: He's My Ever Present Help
- 1993: I'll Live Again
- 1994: I've Weathered The Storm
- 1995: Try God
- 1997: The Big Question (Where Will You Spend Eternity)
- 1997: Jesus Is A Burden Bearer
- 2000: Home In The Rock

Singles

- 1949: Jesus/There Is No Friend
- 1949: Just Jesus/This Same Jesus
- 1949: Touch Me, Lord Jesus/When My Savior Calls Me Home
- 1949: Yes, My Jesus Cares/Somebody Saved Me
- 1950: Back To The Dust/He Never Has Let Me Alone
- 1950: My Life Will Be Sweeter/There Must Be A Heaven Somewhere
- 1950: Remember Me/Follow In His Footsteps
- 1951: Dear Lord, Look Down Upon Me/Standing Out On The Highway
- 1951: Do Lord, Remember Me/Almost Persuaded
- 1951: Glory, Glory Hallelujah/I'm On My Way To Heaven Anyhow
- 1951: Jesus Will Answer Prayer/In The Morning
- 1952: Call On Jesus In Secret Prayer/I Heard Mother Call My Name
- 1952: Glory, Glory To The Newborn King/Jesus Christ Is Born
- 1952: Tell The Angels/My Faith Looks Up To Thee
- 1953: A Child Is Born/Christmas Morning
- 1953: I Thank You Lord/Do Not Pass Me By, O Gentle Savior
- 1953: If It Wasn't For The Lord/God's Roll
- 1953: Jesus Will Carry You Through/My Lord And I
- 1953: Since Jesus Came Into My Heart/Jesus Is All The World To Me
- 1954: Angels Watching Over Me/I'm Going Home To Jesus
- 1955: Jesus Is The Light Of The World/Only A Look
- 1955: Jesus Never Fails Me/I'll Be Alright
- 1955: Jesus Paid It All/I Want To See Him
- 1957: I've Weathered The Storm/Every Day
- 1959: Yes! Nobody Knows My Troubles/Touch Me Lord Jesus
- 1960: All That I Need Is Jesus/Out Of The Depths
- 1960: Jesus Is A Way-Maker/My Sweet Home
- 1961: I'm Getting Nearer (Pt 1)/I'm Getting Nearer (Pt 2)
- 1962: Be Sure He'll Take Care/He Never Left Me Alone
- 1962: Everybody Ought To Pray/Goin' Over Yonder
- 1963: I Shall Know Him/I Want To Go To Heaven
- 1964: Do Lord, Remember Me/Yes! He'll Take Care Of You
- 1965: Don't Know What I'd Do (Without The Lord)/Sometimes I Feel My Time Ain't Long
- 1966: Jesus, When Troubles Burden Me/Standing On The Highway
- 1968: Father I Stretch My Hand/Glory To The New Born King
- 1969: I Hope It Won't Be This Way Always/You Don't Know (What The Lord Has Done)
