= Marvin Sease =

- Born: Marvin Monnie Sease; February 16, 1946; Blackville, South Carolina, U.S.
- Died: February 8, 2011 (aged 64) Vicksburg, Mississippi, U.S.
- Genres: Gospel, blues, soul
- Occupation: Singer
- Instrument: Vocals
- Years active: 1966–2011
- Labels: Polygram Records; Mercury Records; Jive Records; Malaco Records

Marvin Monnie Sease (February 16, 1946 – February 8, 2011) was an American blues and soul singer-songwriter known for his gospel-infused vocal style and erotic lyrics.

== Career ==
Born in Blackville, South Carolina, Sease started as a gospel artist, joining a gospel group called the Five Gospel Crowns, located in Charleston, South Carolina. After singing with them, Sease then left at age 20 for New York City. At this young age settling into New York, he then joined another gospel group called the Gospel Crowns. Having a preference for the musical style of R&B, Sease left the gospel circuit to form his own R&B group. In this group Sease was accompanied by his own three brothers, and named the backing band Naglfar. This band did not find popularity and eventually broke up. He did not quit performing musically, but began to cover songs that started a career with a recurring gig at the Brooklyn club, Casablanca.

In 1986, he recorded a self-titled album, featuring one of his more popular songs, "Ghetto Man". This started his professional career with his fans in the South's circuit of bars, blues festivals, and juke joints. While promoting his self produced and publicized debut album, he entered a recording contract with Polygram. With this contract, he was able to launch his music nationally with the re-release of his self-titled LP on Mercury Records in 1987. This updated release of his previous material also included the new ten-minute track "Candy Licker", which became an instant success for Sease through the South. Success had finally come to Sease without the help of airplay, which deemed his sound too explicit for the audience. Sease's success with "Candy Licker" ensured a strong female-based following. He was said to have a comparable sound to Johnnie Taylor and Tyrone Davis, but without the commercial success.

His only nationally charting hit, "Tonight", reached No. 86 on the US Billboard R&B chart in 1991.

Over the next decade Sease released several more records for Mercury and Jive Records before signing with Malaco Records for his final three albums, Playa Haters (2004), the CD/DVD Grown Up "Live with the Candy Licker" (2005) and Who's Got The Power (2008).

== Death ==
Sease died of complications from pneumonia in Vicksburg, Mississippi, on February 8, 2011, eight days before his 65th birthday.

== Discography ==
=== Studio albums ===
- Ghetto Man (1986)
- Marvin Sease (1987)
- Breakfast (1988)
- The Real Deal (1989)
- Show Me What You Got (1991)
- The Housekeeper (1993)
- Do You Need A Licker? (1994)
- Please Take Me (1996)
- The Bitch Git It All (1997)
- Hoochie Mama (1999)
- A Woman Rather To Be Licked (2001)
- I Got Beat Out (2002)
- Playa Haters (2004)
- Grown Up "Live With The Candy Licker" (2005)
- Who's Got The Power (2008)

=== Singles ===
- "Candy Licker" (1987)
- "Double Crosser" (1987)
- "I Ate You For Breakfast" (1988)
- "The Housekeeper" (1993)
- "I Wanna Do It With You" (1993)
- "I Ate The Whole Thing" (1993)
- "Do You Need A Licker?" (1994)
- "I'm Mr. Jody" (1994)
- "Candy Licker 2" (1996)
- "Hoochie Mama" (1999)
- "I Gotta Clean Up" (2001)
- "Do You Qualify" (2002)
- "I'm Hooked On You" (2002)
- "I Can't Afford To Be Caught" (2002)

=== Compilation albums ===
- The Best Of Marvin Sease (1997)
- Modern Soulman The Collection (2001)
- 20th Century Masters (2003)
- The Best Of Marvin Sease (2004)
- Candy Licker: The Sex and Soul Of Marvin Sease (2006)
