= Mississippi Mass Choir =

The Mississippi Mass Choir
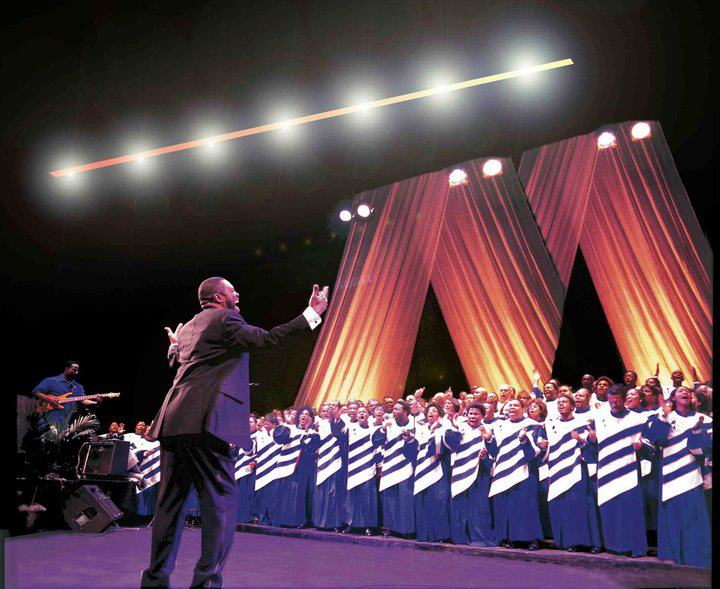
- Taken at Amazing Love album recording, 2002

Background information
- Also known as: The Mass, God's Choir
- Origin: Jackson, Mississippi, U.S.
- Genre: Gospel music
- Years active: 1988–present
- Label: Malaco Records
- Website: mississippimasschoir.org

The Mississippi Mass Choir is an American gospel choir based in Jackson, Mississippi.

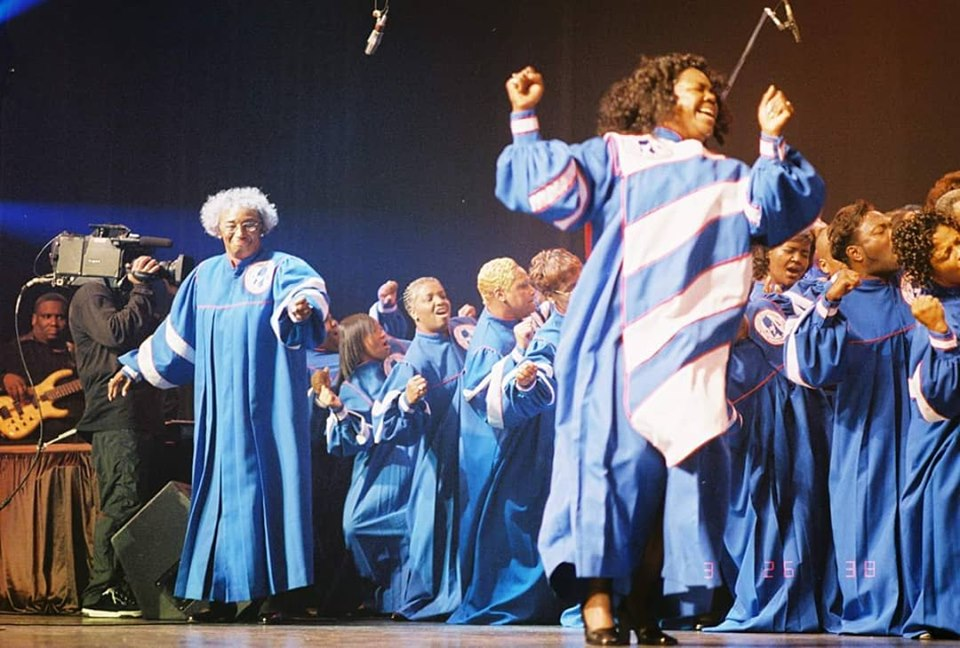
Mississippi Mass Choir

== Musical career ==
After wrestling with the idea of forming a mass choir, Frank Williams, a member of the Jackson Southernaires and an executive in the gospel music division of Malaco Records, decided to form the Mississippi Mass Choir. First, he got the record company's support. Then, he began calling on Mississippi talents like David R. Curry Jr., who became the choir's minister of music. Having laid the foundation, open auditions were held and over 100 voices from across the state came together to form the Mississippi Mass Choir. After months of rehearsals, the Mississippi Mass Choir recorded their eponymous debut album and video live at Thalia Mara Hall (formerly Jackson Municipal Auditorium) on October 29, 1988.

In the spring of 1989, five weeks after their debut album was released, Billboard magazine certified it as the Number 1 Spiritual album in the country. The album stayed on the Billboard charts for 45 consecutive weeks, setting a new record for gospel recordings. At the 9th annual James Cleveland GMWA Awards, the Mississippi Mass Choir won the Choir of the Year-Contemporary, and Best New Artist of the Year-Traditional. They also won four Stellar Awards in 1989 and were nominated in several categories for the 1989 Soul Train Music Awards and Dove Awards.

The choir's second album, God Gets the Glory, was recorded live at the Mississippi Coliseum on December 8, 1990. The album debuted on the Billboard chart in the Number 16 position, reaching Number 1 position two weeks later. Awards followed with the release of the album. The choir recorded two live albums, one in 1991 with Frank Williams and James Moore as leads, and another with Moore in 1995. The choir's third and most popular album, It Remains to Be Seen..., was recorded live at Thalia Mara Hall on January 23, 1993, and remained at the top of the charts for an entire year. This album, unfortunately, was the last album Frank Williams recorded with the choir, as he died of a heart attack in Savannah, Georgia on March 22, 1993.

Eight more albums have been released since Frank Williams' death. Executive director Jerry Mannery states, "We are all about our Father's business. We are not entertainers; we are ministers for Christ. Our mission remains constant; to serve the Lord and spread the Gospel of Jesus Christ."

The choir has ministered in song in over 40 states within the United States, including Alaska. They have traveled to Japan, Italy, Spain, Bahamas, and Greece; becoming the first gospel group to perform at the Acropolis. While attending the Umbria Jazz Gospel and Soul Easter Festival in Terni, Italy, the choir was invited to sing for Pope John Paul II at his summer residence.

On June 19, 2009, the Mississippi Mass Choir commemorated their 20th anniversary by recording their ninth album, ...Then Sings My Soul, live at the First Baptist Church in Jackson. The album was officially released on February 1, 2011.

Also in 2009, the choir released a compilation CD/DVD titled The First Twenty Years, consisting of popular songs recorded over the years, and interviews with various choir members.

From December 8 to 26, 2010, the choir made a fourteen-city tour of Spain and the Canary Islands. According to concert promoter Luis Manjarres, "Since their first Spanish tour, Mississippi Mass Choir has become a classic of the European and the Spanish Christmas. They will showcase their talent in the main venues of Barcelona, Madrid, San Sebastian, Bilbao, Pamplona, Gijon, and Vigo. This tour of fourteen concerts will culminate on Christmas night, in the wonderful city of Santa Cruz de Tenerife at the Canary Islands, in a very special event with the 92-piece Tenerife Symphonic Orchestra, under the direction of Maestro Lu Jia. Mississippi Mass Choir will be the first African American choir to perform with a European Symphonic Orchestra before an audience of 20,000. It is the time for Mississippi Mass Choir ... It is the time for Classic Gospel."

In October 2013, the choir celebrated their 25th anniversary by recording their 10th live album titled Declaration of Dependence. The album's hit single, "God's on Your Side" (featuring gospel artist/Sunday Best winner Le'Andria Johnson and Stan Jones), was released on April 11, 2014, and the album itself was released that June. The choir the begin a 10-city tour and 13 cities Spain tour.

On January 11, 2017, the choir was featured on an episode of ABC's Black-ish.

On October 7, 2018, the choir appeared on an episode of Discovery Channel's Expedition Unknown, titled "Search For The Afterlife – Heaven and Hell", exploring different religions and cultures from around the world.

On October 28, 2022, the choir recorded their eleventh live album at the Word of Life Church in Flowood, Mississippi. Special guests included Mary Mary's Tina Campbell, Crystal Aikin, Myron Butler, Brian Courtney Wilson, and Georgia Mass Choir's founder/leader Rev. Milton Biggham.

On July 7, 2025, veteran choir member Mosie "Mama" Burks died at the age of 92. Burks joined the choir in the mid-1990s as a lead soloist and toured internationally with the choir for decades until her retirement in 2020.

== Awards ==
- March 25, 2017, Stellar Award Honor Hall Of Fame
- January 2000 Mississippi Music Museum Hall of Fame
- 1999 Grammy Award, Grammy nomination
- 9th Annual James Cleveland Gospel Music Workshop of America Excellence Awards Choir of The Year, Contemporary
- Best New Artist of the Year
- 1997 Grammy Award for Best Gospel Album by a Choir or Chorus, I'll See You in the Rapture
- 1997 Stellar Awards Choir of the Year, "I'll See You in the Rapture" Traditional Choir of the Year, "I'll See You in the Rapture"
- 1994 National Association of Record Merchandiser (NARM) Best Sellers Award
- 1994 Stellar Awards, Traditional Choir of the Year, Traditional Album of the Year
- 1994 Dove Award Nomination Contemporary Black Gospel Recorded Song of the Year, "Your Grace and Mercy" from It Remains to Be Seen
- 1994 Soul Train Music Award, Best Gospel Artist
- 1994 3M Corporation, Innovation Award
- 1994 Indie Award Best Selling Gospel Album, It Remains to Be Seen
- 1994 Indie Award, Best Selling Gospel Album, God Gets the Glory
- 1993 National Association of Record Merchandisers (NARM) Best Sellers Award
- 1992 Billboard Magazine, Gospel Artist of the Year
- 1992 Billboard Magazine Gospel Record of the Year, "God Gets the Glory"
- 1992 3M Corporation, Innovation Award
- 1992 Stellar Awards, Traditional Choir of the Year Choir of the Year
- 1992 Stellar Nominations, Album of the Year Video of the Year
- 1991 Billboard, Album of the Year Rev. James Moore – Live with the Mississippi Mass Choir
- 1991 National Association of Record Merchandisers (NARM) Best Sellers Award
- 1991 Indie Award Best Selling Gospel Album, The Mississippi Mass Choir, Live!
- 1990 Billboard Special Achievement Award Recognizing debut album at #1, 45 consecutive weeks.
- 1990 Billboard Magazine Gospel Record of the Year, "The Mississippi Mass Choir Live!"
- 1990 Stellar Award Album of the Year, I'm Yours Lord
- 1990 Billboard Magazine Gospel Artist of the Year
- 1989 Stellar Awards Choir of the Year Album of the Year, Best New Artist, Best Gospel Video
- 1989 Stellar Nomination Song of the Year, "Near the Cross"

== Discography ==
- The Mississippi Mass Choir, released May 25, 1989
- God Gets the Glory, released September 23, 1991
- It Remains to Be Seen..., released May 25, 1993
- I'll See You in the Rapture, released May 21, 1996
- Emmanuel (God With Us), released August 3, 1999
- Amazing Love, released June 4, 2002
- Not by Might, Nor by Power, released February 22, 2005
- We've Seen His Star, released October 16, 2007
- ...Then Sings My Soul, released February 1, 2011
- Declaration of Dependence, released June 3, 2014
- We Still Believe, released August 30, 2024
