= Brian Wilson (footballer, born 1925) =

Australian rules footballer

Personal information
- Full name: Brian Wilson
- Born: 10 November 1925
- Died: 24 September 1984 (aged 58)
- Original team: Kerang
- Height: 182 cm (6 ft 0 in)
- Weight: 80 kg (176 lb)

Playing career^{1}
Years	Club	Games (Goals)
1947–48	Geelong	11 (2)
- ^{1} Playing statistics correct to the end of 1948.

Brian Wilson (10 November 1925 – 24 September 1984) was an Australian rules footballer who played with Geelong in the Victorian Football League (VFL).
