= Brian Denis Wilson =

Brian Denis Wilson CBE (Chinese: 惠柳新;12 June 1924 – 22 May 2024) was a British Army officer and colonial administrator in Hong Kong.

During the Second World War, he took part in Operation Market Garden, during which he lost a leg.

After the war, he joined the Colonial Administrative Service and was posted to Hong Kong, where he rose to become Director of Urban Services.

In 2000, he published a memoir detailing his experiences within the Service from 1943 to 1983.
