= Brian Wilson (astrophysicist) =

Australian astrophysicist and longest-serving UQ Vice-Chancellor

Emeritus Professor Brian Wilson AO
- Born: 1930; Belfast
- Died: 2019 (aged 88–89); France
- Occupation: Astrophysicist
- Awards: Centenary Medal

Professor Brian Graham Wilson AO (1930-2019) was an Australian astrophysicist and academic. He served as Vice-Chancellor of the University of Queensland from 1979 to 1996, the role's longest tenure ever.

Prior to his career in academic administration, he was a noted researcher in astrophysics for over 15 years specialising in cosmic radiation, solar physics and X-ray astronomy.
