= Z. Z. Hill =

American blues singer (1935–1984)

Background information
- Born: Arzell J. Hill; September 30, 1935; Naples, Texas, U.S.
- Died: April 27, 1984 (aged 48) Dallas, Texas, U.S.
- Genres: Blues, soul
- Occupation: Singer
- Years active: Late 1950s–1984
- Labels: M.H., Hill, Kent, Mankind, United Artists, Columbia, Malaco, Rare Bullet
- Spouse: Vivian

Arzell J. "Z. Z." Hill (September 30, 1935 – April 27, 1984) was an American blues singer best known for his recordings in the 1970s and early 1980s, including his 1982 album for Malaco Records, Down Home, which stayed on the Billboard soul album chart for nearly two years. The track "Down Home Blues" has been called the best-known blues song of the 1980s. According to the Texas State Historical Association, Hill "devised a combination of blues and contemporary soul styling and helped to restore the blues to modern black consciousness."

== Early life ==
Hill was born in Naples, Texas.

== Career ==
Hill began his singing career in the late 1950s as part of a gospel group the Spiritual Five, touring Texas. He was influenced by Sam Cooke, B. B. King, and Bobby "Blue" Bland. He began performing his own songs and others in clubs in and around Dallas, including stints fronting bands led by Bo Thomas and Frank Shelton. He took his stage name in emulation of B. B. King. (Note: This, in turn, inspired the band name ZZ Top.)

Encouraged by Otis Redding, who had seen him perform, he joined his older brother Matt Hill, a budding record producer, in Los Angeles in 1963, and released his first single, "You Were Wrong", on the family's M.H. label. It spent one week at number 100 on the Billboard Hot 100 in 1964, and Hill was quickly signed by Kent Records. Most of the songs he recorded for Kent were written or co-written by Hill and arranged by the prominent saxophonist Maxwell Davis. None charted; in retrospect, however, many, such as "I Need Someone (To Love Me)", are now viewed with high regard by fans of soul music.

After leaving Kent in 1968, he recorded briefly for Phil Walden's Capricorn label, based in Macon, Georgia, but after a disagreement with Walden his recording contract was bought by Jerry "Swamp Dogg" Williams' Mankind label, where Hill fulfilled his end of the deal. He returned to California to record for his brother's label, Hill, and the song "Don't Make Me Pay for His Mistakes", produced by Matt Hill and Miles Grayson, became his biggest pop hit, reaching number 62 on the Hot 100. The Kent label reissued his 1964 recording of "I Need Someone", which also charted. Williams also recorded Hill in Muscle Shoals, Alabama, in 1971, resulting in several R&B hits, including "Chokin' Kind" and "It Ain't No Use", as well as the LP The Brand New Z. Z. Hill.

With his brother's help, Hill then signed with United Artists, where he was aided by arrangements and compositions by established R&B talents including Lamont Dozier and Allen Toussaint, and released several singles that made the R&B chart in the mid 1970s. After his brother Matt's sudden death from a heart attack, Z. Z. Hill left United Artists and signed with Columbia Records, recording two albums with leading arranger-producer Bert de Coteaux in New York. Several singles taken from the albums charted, including "Love Is So Good When You're Stealing It", which spent 18 weeks on the Billboard R&B chart in the summer of 1977.

In 1979, he left Columbia and returned south, signing for Malaco Records, a move which, according to Allmusic writer Bill Dahl, "managed to resuscitate both his own semi-flagging career and the entire [blues] genre at large". His first hit for the label was his recording of "Cheating in the Next Room," written by George Jackson, which was released in early 1982 and reached the R&B top 20, spending a total of 20 weeks on the chart. He had a number of best-selling albums for Malaco, the biggest being Down Home, which stayed on the Billboard soul album chart for nearly two years. The song "Down Home Blues", also written by Jackson, was later recorded by labelmate Denise LaSalle. Hill's next album, The Rhythm & the Blues, released in 1982, was also received with critical acclaim, and its success contributed to the subsequent boom in blues music, much of it recorded by the Malaco label, in Jackson, Mississippi.

== Personal life and death ==
While touring in February 1984, Hill was involved in a car crash. He gave his final performance two months later, on April 23, at the Longhorn Ballroom in Dallas, Texas. On April 27, he died of a heart attack arising from a blood clot in his leg that formed after the accident. Malaco Records producer Gerald "Wolf" Stephenson told reporters that a friend found Hill lying in the driveway of his home in Dallas; he was pronounced dead at Charlton Methodist Hospital after attempts to resuscitate him failed.

== Legacy ==
Hill's song "That Ain't the Way You Make Love" was sampled by Madvillain in their track "Fancy Clown."

Hill is the subject of Angela Jackson's poem "One Night ZZ Hill Sang at the Club Tupelo."

The band ZZ Top is partially named for him.

== Discography ==
=== Albums ===
- The Soul Stirring Z.Z. Hill (Kent, 1965)
- A Whole Lot of Soul (Kent, 1967)
- The Brand New Z.Z. Hill (Mankind, 1971)
- The Bluest Blues (Excello [France], 1971) reissue of Mankind album
- Z.Z. Hill's Greatest Hits: Dues Paid in Full (Kent, 1972)
- The Best Thing That's Happened to Me (United Artists, 1973)
- Z.Z. (United Artists, 1974)
- Keep on Loving You (United Artists, 1975)
- Let's Make a Deal (Columbia, 1977)
- The Mark of Z.Z. Hill (Columbia, 1979)
- Z.Z. Hill (Malaco, 1981)
- Down Home (Malaco, 1982)
- The Rhythm & the Blues (Malaco, 1982)
- Velvet Soul (Malibu, 1982)
- I'm a Blues Man (Malaco, 1983)
- Bluesmaster (Malaco, 1984)
- Thrill on the Z.Z. Hill (Rare Bullet, 1984) reissue of Malibu album
- When a Man Loves a Woman (Kent, 1984)
- In Memoriam 1935-1984 (Malaco, 1985)
- Greatest Hits (Malaco, 1986)

=== Charted singles ===
| Year | Single | Chart Positions | |
| Year | Single | US Pop | US R&B |
|---|---|---|---|
| 1964 | "You Were Wrong" | 100 | 20 |
| 1965 | "Hey Little Girl" | 134 | — |
| 1968 | "You Got What I Need" | 129 | — |
| 1971 | "Don't Make Me Pay for His Mistakes" | 62 | 17 |
| 1971 | "I Need Someone (To Love Me)" | 86 | 30 |
| 1971 | "Chokin' Kind" | 108 | 30 |
| 1972 | "Second Chance" | — | 39 |
| 1972 | "It Ain't No Use" | — | 34 |
| 1973 | "Ain't Nothing You Can Do" | 114 | 37 |
| 1973 | "I Don't Need Half a Love" | — | 63 |
| 1974 | "Let Them Talk" | — | 74 |
| 1974 | "Am I Groovin' You" | — | 84 |
| 1974 | "I Keep On Lovin' You" | 104 | 39 |
| 1975 | "I Created a Monster" | 109 | 40 |
| 1977 | "Love Is So Good When You're Stealing It" | 102 | 15 |
| 1978 | "This Time They Told the Truth" | — | 42 |
| 1982 | "Cheating in the Next Room" | — | 19 |
| 1984 | "Get a Little, Give a Little" | — | 85 |

== See also ==
- List of electric blues musicians
- List of soul-blues musicians
- List of blues musicians
