= Jackson Southernaires =

American gospel music group

The Jackson Southernaires
- Origin: Jackson, Mississippi
- Genres: Gospel, urban contemporary gospel, traditional black gospel, southern gospel
- Years active: 1969–present
- Labels: Song Bird, Malaco, MCA, Redemption, Blackberry
- Members: Keith Hampton; Jonah Nelson; Gregory Cooper, Jr. Devon Tate; Israel Coleman; Mardraius Marshall
- Past members: Roger Bryant Jr (deceased); Maurice Surrell; James Burks (deceased); Dr. Gary Miles; Granard McClendon; Melvin Wilson; Frank Williams (deceased); Luther Jennings (deceased); Huey Williams (deceased)

The Jackson Southernaires was an American traditional black gospel music group from Jackson, Mississippi. Producer Frank Crisler formed the group in 1940, yet they did not become active until 1969, with the release of Too Late by Song Bird Records. At the release of their first album, the group consisted of five members; Huey Williams (1938–2025), Roger Bryant Jr., Maurice Surrell, James Burks, and Luther Jennings. The group received a nomination for a Grammy Award in the Best Traditional Gospel Album category at the 34th Annual Grammy Awards. The group has released 28 albums, including their 2010 release, Back Again, with Blackberry Records. Eleven albums have charted on the Billboard magazine charts, only on the Gospel Albums chart. By early 2020, all music tours came to a halt due to the COVID-19 pandemic. By the time the pandemic ended, the lives of few past group members had settled elsewhere. At this time, a few of The Southernaires’ musicians decided to take on the task of being background vocals and continue touring.

== Background ==
The Jackson, Mississippi-based traditional black gospel group, The Jackson Southernaires was founded by record producer, Frank Crisler, in 1940. They did not start actively recording and releasing music until 1969. The group at its inception included Huey Williams, Roger Bryant Jr., Maurice Surrell, James Burks, and Luther Jennings, Dr. Gary Miles, Granard McClendon, Melvin Wilson.

== History ==
The group has released 28 albums from 1969 until 2010, with the following labels: Song Bird Records, Malaco Records, MCA Records, Redemption Records, and Blackberry Records. Of these albums, eleven charted on the Billboard magazine Gospel Albums chart, and those were, Made in Mississippi, Greatest Hits, Lord We Need Your Blessing, Hear Our Prayers O Lord, Power Packed, On the Third Day, Thank You Mama for Praying for Me, Live and Anointed, The Word in Song, The Brothers Dream...Alive, and Warrior. The group received a Grammy Award nomination for the Best Traditional Gospel Album at the 34th Annual Grammy Awards, for the album Thank You Mama for Praying for Me.

Huey Williams died on March 24, 2025, at the age of 86.

== Members ==
Current

- James McAbee Jr.
- Keith Hampton
- Chris Forrest
- Mack Adams
- Jonah Nelson
- Gregory Cooper, Jr.
- Devon Tate
- Israel Coleman
- Mardraius Marshall

Former

- Willie Banks (deceased)
- Roger Bryant Jr. (deceased)
- Luther Jennings (deceased)
- Rev. Charles E. Polk Sr. (deceased)
- Frank Williams (deceased)
- Plathell Paul Peters (deceased)
- Huey Williams (deceased)
- James Burks (deceased)

== Discography ==
(*) – Denotes a Grammy Award nomination, for that particular album

List of selected albums, with selected chart positions
Title	Album details	Peak chart positions
Title	Album details	US Gos
Made in Mississippi	Released: 1984; Label: Malaco; Formats: CD, digital download	4
Greatest Hits	Released: 1985; Label: Malaco; Formats: CD, digital download	15
Lord We Need Your Blessing	Released: 1986; Label: Malaco; Formats: CD, digital download	9
Hear Our Prayers O Lord	Released: 1987; Label: Melendo; Formats: CD, digital download	9
Power Packed	Released: 1988; Label: Malaco; Formats: CD, digital download	12
On the Third Day	Released: 1989; Label: Malaco; Formats: CD, digital download	9
Thank You Mama for Praying for Me*	Released: 1991; Label: Malaco; Formats: CD, digital download	9
Live and Anointed	Released: 1992; Label: Malaco; Formats: CD, digital download	12
The Word in Song	Released: 1995; Label: Malaco; Formats: CD, digital download	14
The Brothers Dream...Alive	Released: 1996; Label: Malaco; Formats: CD, digital download	28
Warrior	Released: 1999; Label: Malaco; Formats: CD, digital download	34
