= The Dixie Nightingales =

African-American male vocal group

- Also known as: Ollie & the Nightingales, The Nightingales
- Origin: Memphis, Tennessee, United States
- Genres: Gospel, R&B, soul
- Years active: 1958–1972
- Labels: Pepper, Nashboro, Chalice, Stax
- Past members: Ollie Hoskins; Willie Neal; Nelson Lesure; Bill Davis; Rochester Neal; David Ruffin; Quincy Billops Jr. Tommy Tate

The Dixie Nightingales, also known as Ollie & the Nightingales and The Nightingales, was an African-American male vocal group, whose repertoire included gospel and later rhythm and blues and soul music.

== History ==
The group, based in Memphis, Tennessee, was founded as The Gospel Writer Juniors, later changing its name to The Dixie Nightingales. The founding members included Ollie Hoskins (born 1936 in Batesville, Mississippi, United States, died October 26, 1997, Memphis, Tennessee), Willie Neal, Nelson Lesure, Bill Davis, and Rochester Neal. With Hoskins as lead singer, The Dixie Nightingales became one of the most prominent and successful southern gospel groups of the 1950s and 1960s, and made their first records for Pepper Records in 1958. During the late 1950s and early 1960s, one of their members was a teen-aged David Ruffin, who would later go on to find fame as lead singer of The Temptations.

In 1962, The Dixie Nightingales moved to Nashboro Records. Three years later, Randle Catron brought the group to Stax Records, where new executive Al Bell had started a gospel subsidiary, Chalice Records. The Dixie Nightingales recorded three singles for Chalice, including "The Assassination", about the murder of U.S. President John F. Kennedy.

After some convincing from Al Bell, the group decided to turn to secular soul music in 1968. Willie Neal left the act that this time, and was replaced by Quincy Billops Jr., a former member of Stax's The Mad Lads.

Changing their name to Ollie & the Nightingales, the group moved to the main Stax label, where they released a number of singles. Their most successful was 1968's "I Know I've Got a Sure Thing", a William Bell/Booker T. Jones composition which peaked at number 16 on the Billboard Black Singles chart. Follow-ups such as "I've Got a Feeling" and "You're Leaving Me" were not as successful. Ollie & the Nightingales also sung backing vocals for Eddie Floyd on his 1968 hit single "I've Never Met a Girl (To Love Me Like You Do)"

In 1969, the group released a long-playing album, Ollie & the Nightingales; "I Got a Sure Thing" was not included because Atlantic Records retained ownership of that single and all other pre-1968 Stax material after Stax severed its distribution deal with Atlantic.

In 1970, Hoskins left to pursue a solo career as "Ollie Nightingale". He recorded a few R&B charting singles before moving on to perform blues in Memphis. Stax's Sir Mack Rice recruited Tommy Tate to replace Hoskins, and the group recorded three singles for Stax in the early 1970s before disbanding. Bill Davis, Quincy Billops Jr., and Rochester Neal left Stax, and went on to join The Ovations.

Ollie Nightingale appeared in the 1993 film The Firm, starring Tom Cruise, and recorded four albums for Ecko Records afterwards. He died in Memphis on October 26, 1997, of a heart attack.

== Stax discography ==
=== Singles ===
The Dixie Nightingales

- 1965: "The Assassination" b/w "Hush Hush"
- 1965: "I Don't Know" b/w "Keep On Trying"
- 1966: "Forgive These Fools" b/w "There's Not A Friend"

Ollie & the Nightingales

- 1968: "I Got a Sure Thing" b/w "Girl You Have My Heart Singing" (US #73, US R&B #17)
- 1969: "You're Leaving Me" b/w "Showered With Love" (US R&B #47)
- 1969: "Mellow Way You Treat Your Man" b/w "Don't Do What I Did"
- 1969: "I've Got a Feeling" b/w "You'll Never Do Wrong" (US R&B #45)
- 1970: "Bracing Myself For The Fall" b/w "I'll Be Your Anything"

The Nightingales

- 1970: "You’re Moving Much Too Fast" b/w "Don’t Let a Good Thing Go"
- 1970: "I Don’t Want To Be Like My Daddy" b/w "Just a Little Overcome"
- 1971: "Don’t Do It I’m With You" b/w "Can’t Get Away"

=== Album ===
- 1969: Ollie & the Nightingales (Stax 2021):
  - "You'll Never Do Wrong"/ "Don't Make the Good Suffer"/ "Don't Do What I Did"/ "I've Got a Feeling"/ "You're Leaving Me"/ "Broke-In Love"/ "A-B-C-D"/ "Mellow Way You Treat Your Man"/ "Girl You Make My Heart Sing"/ "I've Never Found a Girl"/ "Showered With Love"
