= Malaco Records =

American record label founded 1962

- Parent company: Malaco Music Group
- Founded: 1962
- Founder: Tommy Couch; Mitchell Malouf
- Distributor: Malaco Music Group
- Genre: Gospel, R&B, soul, southern soul, blues, funk, roots music
- Country of origin: U.S.
- Location: Jackson, Mississippi
- Official website: www.malaco.com

Malaco Records is an American independent record label based in Jackson, Mississippi, United States, that has been the home of various major blues and gospel acts, such as Johnnie Taylor, Bobby Bland, Latimore, Z. Z. Hill, Denise LaSalle, Dorothy Moore, Little Milton, Shirley Brown, Tyrone Davis, Marvin Sease, and the Mississippi Mass Choir. It has received a historic marker issued by the Mississippi Blues Commission to commemorate its important place on the Mississippi Blues Trail.

A tornado on April 15, 2011, destroyed much of the company's main building and studio at 3023 West Northside Drive in Jackson, Mississippi, which have since been re-built.

== Company history ==
=== Beginnings: 1962–1975 ===
Malaco (/ˈmæləkoʊ/ MAL-ə-koh) Inc. was founded in 1962 by Tommy Couch and Mitchell Malouf, initially as a booking agency. In 1967, the company opened a recording studio in a building that remains the home of Malaco. Experimenting with local songwriters and artists, the company began producing master recordings. Malaco needed to license its early recordings with established labels for national distribution. Between 1968 and 1970, Capitol Records released six singles and a Grammy Award-nominated album by Mississippi Fred McDowell. Revenue from record releases was minimal, however, and Malaco survived doing jingles, booking bands, promoting concerts, and renting the studio for custom projects.

In May 1970, a bespectacled producer-arranger changed the struggling company's fortune. Wardell Quezergue made his mark with New Orleans stalwarts Fats Domino and Professor Longhair, among others. Quezergue offered to supply Malaco with artists in return for studio time and session musicians. Quezergue brought five artists to Jackson in a borrowed school bus for a marathon session that yielded two hits – King Floyd's "Groove Me" and Jean Knight's "Mr. Big Stuff." But the tracks met rejection when submitted to Stax and Atlantic Records for distribution. Frustrated, Malaco released the King Floyd tracks on its own Chimneyville label. When "Groove Me" started radio play and sales, Atlantic picked the record up for distribution after all, giving Malaco a label deal for future Chimneyville product. "Groove Me" entered the national charts in October, going to No. 1 on the US Billboard R&B chart and No. 6 on the Billboard Hot 100. In 1971, Chimneyville scored again with King Floyd's "Baby Let Me Kiss You" (No. 5 R&B and No. 29 Pop). Meanwhile, Stax decided to take a chance on "Mr. Big Stuff", selling over two million copies on the way to No. 1 on the R&B chart and No. 2 pop.

Malaco's studio and session musicians were now in demand. Drummer James Stroud, bassist Vernie Robbins and guitarist Jerry Puckett were the nucleus of the Malaco Rhythm Section, later joined by keyboardist Carson Whitsett. Atlantic sent the Pointer Sisters among others for the Malaco touch; Stax sent Rufus Thomas and others. In January 1973, Paul Simon recorded "Learn How to Fall" for his There Goes Rhymin' Simon album. Later that year, Malaco released its first gospel record, "Gospel Train" by the Golden Nuggets on Atlantic's Cotillion label. Also in 1973, King Floyd's "Woman Don't Go Astray" made No. 5 R&B.

When Dorothy Moore recorded "Misty Blue" in 1973, Malaco got rejection slips trying to shop the master to other labels. Two years later, Malaco was just about broke and desperate for something to sell. With just enough cash to press and mail out the record, "Misty Blue" was released on the Malaco label just before Thanksgiving.

=== Golden era: 1976–1985 ===
Dorothy Moore's "Misty Blue" earned gold records around the world, peaking at No. 2 R&B and No. 3 pop in the US, and No. 5 in the UK Singles Chart in 1976. This was followed by thirteen chart records. Moore got four Grammy Award nominations in her career. Other signings to the label included funk bands such as Freedom, Natural High, Power, and Sho-Nuff.

Another Malaco gamble in the late 1970s was targeting the gospel market again with the Jackson Southernaires. The gamble paid off, and other premium gospel artists signed on, including the Soul Stirrers, The Sensational Nightingales, The Williams Brothers, The Truthettes, Willie Banks and the Messengers and the Angelic Gospel Singers. The Southernaires's Frank Williams became Malaco's Director of Gospel Operations, producing virtually every Malaco gospel release until his death in 1993. By 1977, songwriters, artists, and producers from the defunct Stax Records were knocking on Malaco's doors, including Eddie Floyd, Frederick Knight, The Fiestas, and David Porter.

By this time, Malaco had stopped trying to compete with mainstream labels. However, Malaco could make a tidy profit selling between 25,000 and 50,000 units. Starting with Z. Z. Hill, Malaco became the center for old-time blues and soul artists. Hill released the single "Cheating in the Next Room", which reached R&B No. 19 in 1982. Hill's album, Down Home Blues, sold over 500,000 copies, before he suddenly died in 1984. Hearing Johnnie Taylor sing at the funeral service, Tommy Couch invited Taylor to become Malaco's new flagship artist.

Denise LaSalle charted fourteen times in the 1970s. After 29 chart entries for other labels, blues guitarist Little Milton signed with Malaco in 1984. Little Milton's first Malaco single "The Blues is Alright" re-established his presence as a major blues artist, and solidified Malaco's reputation as the contemporary southern blues company. In 1985, Malaco signed Bobby Bland. He had notched up 62 Billboard R&B chart records in 25 years.

In 1985, the principals at Malaco, Tommy Couch, Wolf Stephenson and Stewart Madison bought Muscle Shoals Sound Studios which, by that time, was located at 1000 Alabama Avenue in Sheffield, Alabama.

=== 1986–2010 ===
Bobby Bland had a hit album, Midnight Run, on the US soul album chart in 1989. Johnnie Taylor had his final hit on the Billboard Hot Black Singles chart in 1990. In 1996, the label signed the Chicago-based soul singer, Tyrone Davis to the label, almost 30 years after his first major hit "Can I Change My Mind", an R&B No. 1.

In 2005, the owners decided to sell the studio in Sheffield because they were having difficulty keeping it booked. The building was bought by a film and television production company.

== Malaco studio destroyed ==
On April 15, 2011, the company's Jackson studio and offices were hit by a tornado that caused major damage and destruction. Thousands of master tapes from recording sessions survived intact in a separate concrete vault. The company decided to re-build the damaged offices and recording studio on the same site and the new buildings were opened in the fall of 2012. This storm came six years after Hurricane Katrina also hit the area, causing some damage to the Malaco premises.

== Gospel ==
Clearly the dominant contemporary southern blues label, Malaco purchased the gospel division of Savoy Records in 1986. Now, Malaco was also the preeminent black gospel company in North America. The Savoy acquisition brought a vast catalog of recordings, including albums by Shirley Caesar, Rev. James Cleveland, Albertina Walker, The Caravans, and Inez Andrews. In further expansion moves that year, Malaco entered the world of telemarketing. Malaco's gospel labels under Jerry Mannery, and Savoy Records under Milton Biggham, earned multiple honors, including Billboard designations as Top Gospel Label and Top Gospel Distributor. The company also dominated Billboard Gospel charts, achieving No. 1 rankings by Keith Pringle, Walter Hawkins, Rev. James Moore, The Mississippi Mass Choir, and Dorothy Norwood.

== Malaco Music Group ==
Malaco's market focus widened dramatically in 1995. Songwriter/producer Rich Cason cut "Good Love" with Johnnie Taylor. In 1996, Taylor's eighth "album" for Malaco, Good Love!, reached #15 on Billboard R&B album chart.

In 1997, Malaco was without a distribution deal and formed Malaco Music Group, which consists of Malaco Records and its subsidiaries. The company continued its steady, prudent expansion, purchasing half of the Memphis-based distributor Select-O-Hits and also making inroads into the urban contemporary, hip hop, and contemporary Christian markets.

Malaco Records has been designated as a marker on the Mississippi Blues Trail. The company continues to release records in the 21st century.

== Labels under Malaco ==
- Chimneyville Records
- Freedom Records
- J-Town Records
- Malaco Jazz Records
- Muscle Shoals Sound
- Muscle Shoals Sound Gospel
- Gospel Savoy Records
- Waldoxy Records
- Mainstreet Records
- Jambalya Music
- Savoy Records
- Juana Records
- Apollo Records
- Onyx Records
- Shurfine Records
- 601 Records
- Atlanta International Records

== Artists ==
- Angelic Gospel Singers
- Anita Ward
- Blind Boys of Alabama
- Bobby Bland
- Bobby Rush
- Bryan Andrew Wilson
- The Caravans
- Clara Ward & The Famous Ward Singers
- The Controllers
- The Davis Sisters
- Denise LaSalle
- Dondria
- Dorothy Moore
- Dorothy Norwood
- Dottie Peoples
- Eddie Floyd
- Fern Kinney
- Floyd Taylor
- Mississippi Fred McDowell
- Freedom
- G. C. Cameron
- George Jackson
- Grady Champion
- Jackson Southernaires
- James Cleveland
- James Moore
- Jean Knight
- Jekalyn Carr
- Johnnie Taylor
- Keith Pringle
- King Floyd
- LaShun Pace
- Larry Hamilton
- Latimore
- Little Milton
- Luther Ingram
- Mahalia Jackson
- Marion Williams & The Stars of Faith
- Marvin Sease
- Maurette Brown Clark
- McKinley Mitchell
- Mel Waiters
- Mississippi Mass Choir
- Mosley and Johnson
- Natural High (band)
- Pilgrim Jubilees
- Power (band)
- Robert Anderson
- The Roberta Martin Singers
- Ruby Terry
- Ruby Wilson
- Shirley Brown
- Sho-Nuff
- Slim & the Supreme Angels
- Sounds of Blackness
- The Sensational Nightingales
- The Williams Brothers
- Tommy Tate
- Tyrone Davis
- Willie Banks
- Willie Clayton
- Willie Neal Johnson & The Gospel Keynotes
- Z. Z. Hill

== See also ==
- Stax Records
- Goldwax Records
- Hi Records
- List of record labels
