= Villa Rica historical markers =

This is an incomplete list of historical markers in Villa Rica, a town in the U.S. state of Georgia. This list shows a mix of Georgia state, Georgia Historical Society and private markers, and is missing a number of Villa Rica Historic Preservation Commission historic markers.

== Thomas A Dorsey ==
=== Marker text ===
Thomas A. Dorsey historical marker

THOMAS A. DORSEY

Father of Gospel

Thomas Andrew Dorsey, composer of over 400 blues and gospel songs, lived here following his birth in Villa Rica on July 1, 1899. At Mt. Prospect Baptist Church he was exposed to shape-note singing and at home learned to play a used pump organ, experiences he said "sprang" his career. The young blues pianist moved to Chicago in 1919 in the Great Migration.

Dorsey wrote the world's most popular gospel-blues song after his wife and newborn son died unexpectedly on August 26 and 27, 1932. That song, Take My Hand, Precious Lord has been translated into 32 languages. Aretha Franklin recorded Take My Hand, Precious Lord in 1956, the same year Tennessee Governor Frank Clement recited it during his keynote address at the Democratic National Convention. It became the anthem of Fannie Lou Hamer's Mississippi Summer. Dorsey's friend, Mahalia Jackson, sang it at Martin Luther King, Jr.'s funeral. Elvis Presley's recording of Dorsey's second-most-popular gospel song, Peace in the Valley, sold millions of copies.

For a while, any new gospel-blues song, regardless of who wrote it, was called a "Dorsey" until Dorsey himself coined the name "gospel". Dorsey died in Chicago on January 23, 1993.

022-8 GEORGIA HISTORIC MARKER 1994

=== Historical information ===
This historical marker sits alongside U.S. Hwy 78 because the actual house Dorsey was born in has been gone a long time. Dorsey's home was approximately 1/4 mile NNW of the marker's location. The Mt. Prospect Baptist Church building Dorsey learned music in has also been gone a long time although the church itself is still an active part of the Villa Rica community.

Thomas Andrew Dorsey (July 1, 1899, Villa Rica, Georgia - January 23, 1993, Chicago), is known as "the father of gospel music". Earlier in his life he was a leading blues pianist known as Georgia Tom.

As formulated by Dorsey, gospel music combines Christian praise with the rhythms of jazz and the blues.

Dorsey was the music director at Pilgrim Baptist Church in Chicago from 1932 until the late 1970s. His best-known composition, "Take My Hand, Precious Lord", was performed by Mahalia Jackson and was a favorite of the Rev. Martin Luther King Jr., and "Peace in the Valley", which was a hit for Red Foley in 1951 and has been performed by dozens of other artists, including Elvis Presley and Johnny Cash.

In 2002, the Library of Congress honored his album Precious Lord: New Recordings of the Great Songs of Thomas A. Dorsey (1973), by adding it to the United States National Recording Registry.

== Villa Rica explosion ==
=== Villa Rica Explosion ===
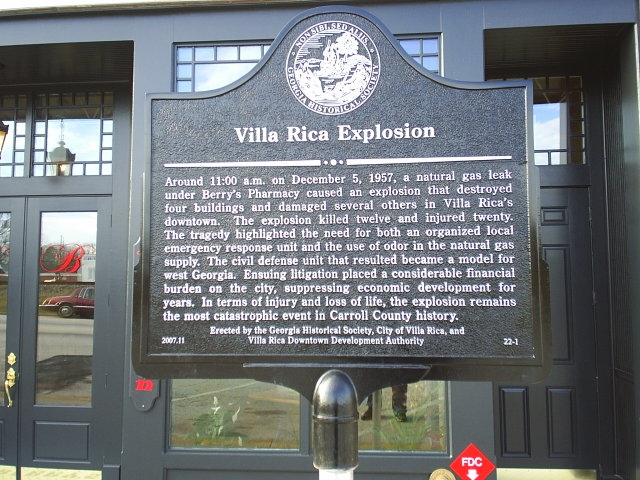
Villa Rica Explosion historical marker

Around 11:00 a.m. on December 5, 1957, a natural gas leak under Berry’s Pharmacy caused an explosion that destroyed four buildings and damaged several others in Villa Rica’s downtown. The explosion killed twelve and injured twenty. The tragedy highlighted the need for both an organized local emergency response unit and the use of odor in the natural gas supply.

The civil defense unit that resulted became a model for west Georgia. Ensuing litigation placed a considerable financial burden on the city, suppressing economic development for years. In terms of injury and loss of life, the explosion remains the most catastrophic event in Carroll County history.

2007.11 Erected by the Georgia Historical Society, City of Villa Rica, and Villa Rica Downtown Development Authority 22-1

=== Historical information ===
This historical marker sits in front of Berry's Pharmacy on U.S. Route 78 in downtown Villa Rica. The building was completely destroyed but was immediately rebuilt and served as a pharmacy until the late 1990s. A restoration project began in 2005 and the building was reopened to the public on December 5, 2007, the 50th anniversary of the explosion.

The other three neighboring stores destroyed by the explosion were Harris Five and Ten Cent Store, Reeves Jewelry, and A & B Dress Shop. Numerous local citizens and groups responded to the emergency including fire and police forces from four surrounding counties, Civil Defense, the Army National Guard, the Georgia State Patrol, the high school football team, the Red Cross, the Boy Scouts, and two fire companies from the City of Atlanta. Southwire, a major manufacturer from nearby Carrollton, supplied cranes to help move debris in the search for victims. Crews from Georgia Power and Atlanta Gas and Light Company stayed for several days to ensure there was no further danger. And Americans from as far away as California and New York State sent contributions and letters of condolence to the local ministers to help with the aftermath of the tragedy.

== The Grove ==
=== Marker text ===
THE GROVE

In the mid-17th century, John Tyson traveled from the British Isles to Virginia. Over the next 200 years, his descendents migrated to North Carolina and on to Georgia. Alexander, Clement, and Jehu Tyson and their mother Penelope settled this land in 1853. Their children, including Willie, Joseph T., and Solomon, were born here and helped establish local churches and schools. Descendents of Willie's five children, Oscar, Lizzie T. Gardner, Tom, Fannie T. Payne, and Will D., consider this their ancestral home and return to the Grove each year to renew family ties.

TYSON FAMILY AND FRIENDS 2003

=== Historical information ===
This historical marker is located just north of Tyson road three miles due south of downtown Villa Rica. Several homes still occupied by various branches of the Tyson family surround the location.
