= National Recording Registry =

List of sound recordings preserved in the U.S. Library of Congress

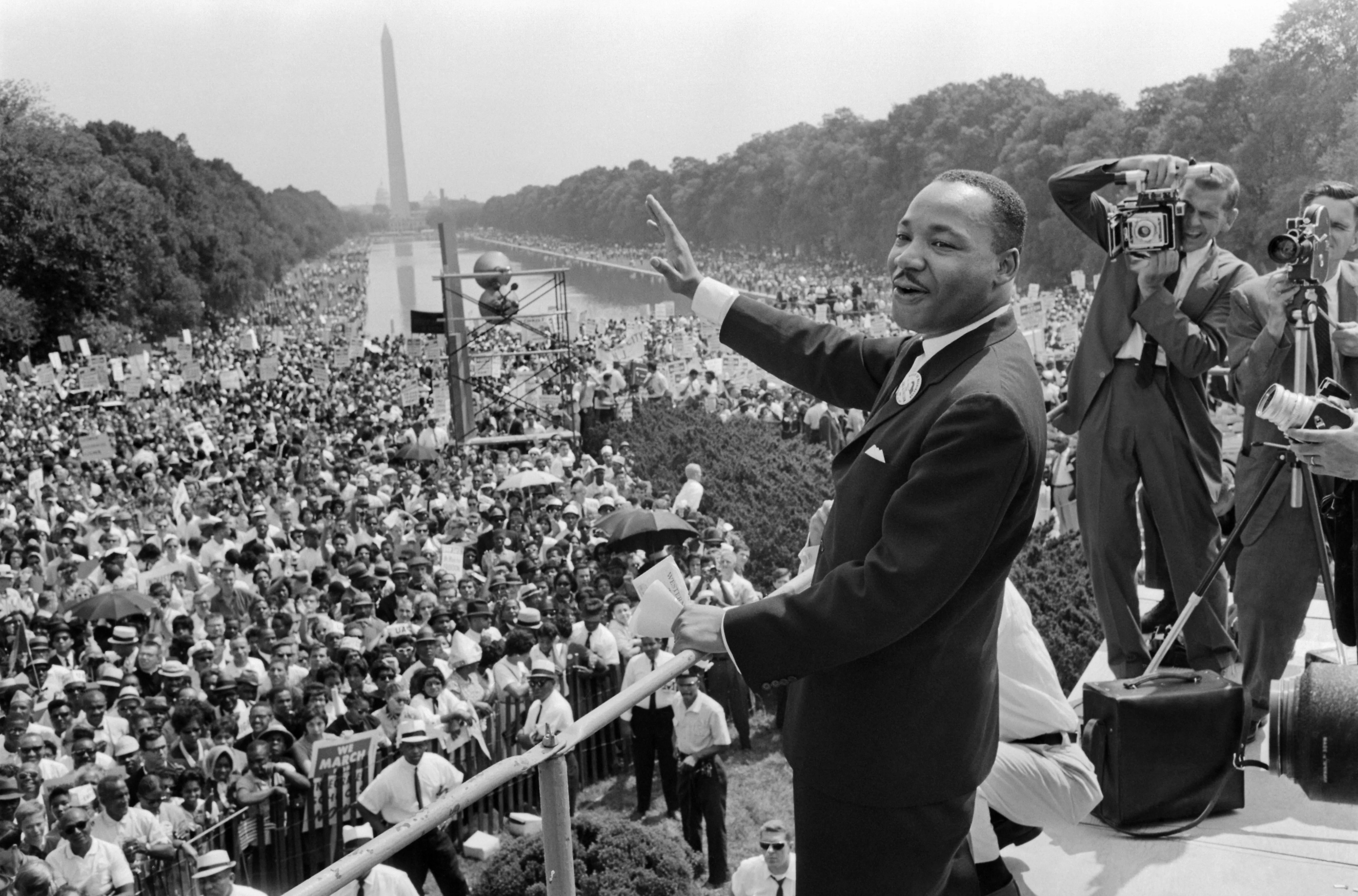
Martin Luther King Jr.'s 1963 "I Have a Dream" speech was one of 50 recordings preserved in 2002, the first year of existence of the United States National Recording Registry.

The National Recording Registry is a list of sound recordings that "are culturally, historically, or aesthetically significant, and inform or reflect life in the United States". The registry was established by the National Recording Preservation Act of 2000, which created the National Recording Preservation Board, whose members are appointed by the librarian of Congress. The recordings preserved in the United States National Recording Registry form a registry of recordings selected yearly by the National Recording Preservation Board for preservation in the Library of Congress.

The National Recording Preservation Act of 2000 established a national program to guard America's sound recording heritage. The Act created the National Recording Registry, the National Recording Preservation Board, and a fundraising foundation. The purpose of the Registry is to maintain and preserve sound recordings and collections of sound recordings that are culturally, historically, or aesthetically significant. In 2002, the National Recording Preservation Board selected recordings nominated each year to be preserved. On January 27, 2003, the first 50 recordings were announced by James Billington, the librarian of Congress.

The first four yearly lists had 50 selections each. Since 2006, 25 recordings have been selected annually. As of 2026, 700 recordings have been preserved in the Registry. Each calendar year, public nominations are accepted for inclusion in that year's list of selections, which are announced the following spring.

Registry title works, original or copies, are housed at the Library of Congress's Packard Campus for Audio Video Conservation. Each yearly list typically includes a few recordings that have also been selected for inclusion in the holdings of the National Archives' audiovisual collection. Political recordings on the National Recording Registry tend to overlap with the audiovisual collection of the National Archives.

== Selection criteria ==
The criteria for selection are:

- Recordings selected for the National Recording Registry are "culturally, historically or aesthetically significant", and inform or reflect culture in the United States.
- Recordings will not be considered for inclusion in the National Recording Registry if no copy of the recording exists.
- No recording is eligible for inclusion in the National Recording Registry until ten years after the recording's creation.

== Inductees ==
The list shows overlapping items and whether the National Archives has an original or a copy of the recording.

Recording or collection	Performer or agent	Release year	Induction year	National Archives
Edison exhibition recordings (Group of three cylinders): "Around the World on the Phonograph"; "The Pattison Waltz"; "Fifth Regiment March"	Thomas Edison	1888–1889	2002	
Passamaquoddy Indians field recordings	Recorded by Jesse Walter Fewkes	1890	2002	
"The Stars and Stripes Forever" Berliner Gramophone disc recording	Military Band	1897	2002	
Metropolitan Opera cylinder recordings (the Mapleson Cylinders)	Lionel Mapleson and the Metropolitan Opera	1900–1903	2002	
"Casey at the Bat"	DeWolf Hopper	1906	2002	
"Vesti la giubba" from Pagliacci	Enrico Caruso	1907	2002	
1895 Atlanta Exposition speech	Booker T. Washington	1908 recreation	2002	copy
"Swing Low, Sweet Chariot"	Fisk Jubilee Singers	1909	2002	
Lovey's Trinidad String Band recordings for Columbia Records	Lovey's Trinidad String Band	1912	2002	
Ragtime compositions piano rolls	Scott Joplin	1916	2002	
"Tiger Rag"	Original Dixieland Jazz Band	1918	2002	
"Arkansas Traveler" and "Sallie Gooden"	Eck Robertson	1922	2002	
"Downhearted Blues"	Bessie Smith	1923	2002	
Rhapsody in Blue	George Gershwin, piano; Paul Whiteman Orchestra	1924	2002	
Louis Armstrong's Hot Five and Hot Seven recordings	Louis Armstrong's Hot Five and Hot Seven	1925–1928	2002	
Victor Talking Machine Company sessions in Bristol, Tennessee	Carter Family, Jimmie Rodgers, Ernest Stoneman, and others	1927	2002	
Highlander Center Field Recordings Collection	Rosa Parks, Esau Jenkins and others	1930s–1980s	2002	
Bell Laboratories experimental stereo recordings	Philadelphia Orchestra; Leopold Stokowski, conductor	1931–1932	2002	
"Fireside chats" radio broadcasts (Note: The original 25 recordings from July 24, 1933, and July 28, 1934, are preserved at the Roosevelt Library in Hyde Park, New York.)	Franklin D. Roosevelt	1933–1944	2002	original
Harvard Vocarium record series	T. S. Eliot, W. H. Auden and others	1933–1956	2002	
"New Music Quarterly" recordings series	Henry Cowell, producer	1934–1949	2002	
Description of the crash of the Hindenburg	Herbert Morrison	May 16, 1937	2002	original
The Cradle Will Rock	Marc Blitzstein and the original cast of The Cradle Will Rock	1938	2002	
"Who's on First?"; Earliest existing radio broadcast version	Abbott and Costello	October 6, 1938	2002	
The War of the Worlds	Orson Welles and The Mercury Theatre on the Air	October 30, 1938	2002	copy
"God Bless America"; Radio broadcast premiere	Kate Smith	November 11, 1938	2002	
The John and Ruby Lomax Southern States Recording Trip	John and Ruby Lomax	1939	2002	
"Strange Fruit"	Billie Holiday	1939	2002	
Grand Ole Opry; First network radio broadcast	Uncle Dave Macon, Roy Acuff, and others	October 14, 1939	2002	
Béla Bartók and Joseph Szigeti in Concert at the Library of Congress	Béla Bartók, piano; Joseph Szigeti, violin	April 13, 1940	2002	
The Rite of Spring	Igor Stravinsky conducting the New York Philharmonic	1940	2002	
Blanton-Webster era recordings	Duke Ellington Orchestra	1940–1942	2002	
"White Christmas" original 1942 single	Bing Crosby	1942	2002	
"This Land Is Your Land"	Woody Guthrie	1944	2002	
D-Day radio address to the Allied Nations (June 6, 1944, order of the day and People of Western Europe speech)	Dwight D. Eisenhower	June 6, 1944	2002	original
"Ko Ko"	Charlie Parker, Miles Davis, Dizzy Gillespie, and others	1945	2002	
"Blue Moon of Kentucky"	Bill Monroe and the Blue Grass Boys	1947	2002	
"How High the Moon"	Les Paul and Mary Ford	1951	2002	
Songs for Young Lovers	Frank Sinatra	1954	2002	
Sun Records sessions	Elvis Presley	1954–1955	2002	
Dance Mania	Tito Puente	1958	2002	
Kind of Blue	Miles Davis	1959	2002	
"What'd I Say", Parts 1 and 2	Ray Charles	1959	2002	
The Freewheelin' Bob Dylan	Bob Dylan	1963	2002	
"I Have a Dream" speech	Dr. Martin Luther King Jr.	August 28, 1963	2002	copy
"Respect"	Aretha Franklin	1967	2002	
Philomel: For Soprano (Milton Babbitt)	Bethany Beardslee, recorded soprano, and synthesized sound	1971	2002	
Precious Lord: New Recordings of the Great Gospel Songs of Thomas A. Dorsey	Thomas A. Dorsey, Marion Williams, and others	1973	2002	
Crescent City Living Legends Collection (New Orleans Jazz and Heritage Foundation Archive/WWOZ New Orleans)	Clifton Chenier, Professor Longhair, Queen Ida, and other performers	1973–1990	2002	
"The Message"	Grandmaster Flash and the Furious Five	1982	2002	
"The Lord's Prayer" and "Twinkle, Twinkle, Little Star"	Emile Berliner	c. 1890	2003	
"Honolulu Cake Walk"	Vess Ossman	1898	2003	
Victor Releases	Bert Williams and George Walker	1901	2003	
"You're a Grand Old Rag [Flag]"	Billy Murray	1906	2003	
Chippewa/Ojibwe Cylinder Collection	Frances Densmore	1907–1910	2003	
The Bubble Book (the first Bubble Book)		1917	2003	
Cylinder recordings of African-American music	Guy B. Johnson	1920s	2003	
"Cross of Gold" speech Speech re-enactment	William Jennings Bryan	1921	2003	
"The OKeh Laughing Record"	Lucie Bernardo and Otto Rathke	1922	2003	
"Adeste Fideles"	Associated Glee Clubs of America	1925	2003	
Cajun-Creole Columbia releases	Amédé Ardoin and Dennis McGee	1929	2003	
"Goodnight, Irene"	Lead Belly	1933	2003	
"Every Man a King" speech	Huey P. Long	February 23, 1934	2003	copy
The Complete Recordings	Robert Johnson	1936–1937	2003	
Interviews conducted by Alan Lomax	Jelly Roll Morton, Alan Lomax	1938	2003	
Carnegie Hall Jazz Concert	Benny Goodman	January 16, 1938 (released 1998)	2003	
Complete day of radio broadcasting, WJSV (Washington, D.C.)	WJSV, Washington, D.C.	September 21, 1939	2003	original
"New San Antonio Rose"	Bob Wills and His Texas Playboys	1940	2003	
Selections from George Gershwin's Folk Opera Porgy and Bess	George Gershwin and the original Broadway cast of Porgy and Bess	1940, 1942	2003	
Beethoven String Quartets	Budapest String Quartet	1940–1950	2003	
World Series – Game Four; New York Yankees vs. Brooklyn Dodgers	Red Barber, Bob Elson and Bill Corum	October 5, 1941	2003	
Oklahoma! Original Broadway cast recording (Note: This recording is, or was made for, the soundtrack of a Pulitzer Prize-winning production.)	The original Broadway cast of Oklahoma!	1943	2003	
Othello	Paul Robeson, Uta Hagen, José Ferrer, and others	1943	2003	
Bach B-Minor Mass	Robert Shaw Chorale	1947	2003	
The Four Seasons (Vivaldi)	Louis Kaufman and the Concert Hall String Orchestra	1947	2003	
Piano Sonata No. 2, "Concord" (Ives)	John Kirkpatrick	1948	2003	
Pictures at an Exhibition (Modest Mussorgsky)	Rafael Kubelík conducting the Chicago Symphony Orchestra	1951	2003	
"Problems of the American Home"	Billy Graham	1954	2003	
Goldberg Variations (Bach)	Glenn Gould	1955	2003	
Ella Fitzgerald Sings the Cole Porter Song Book	Ella Fitzgerald	1956	2003	
"He's Got the Whole World in His Hands"	Marian Anderson	1956 (Note: Described elsewhere on website as 1936.)	2003	
"Roll Over Beethoven"	Chuck Berry	1956	2003	
Brilliant Corners	Thelonious Monk	1956	2003	
Steam locomotive recordings, 6 vol.	O. Winston Link	1956–1960 (released 1957–1977)	2003	
Complete Ring Cycle (Richard Wagner)	Georg Solti and the Vienna Philharmonic	1958–1965	2003	
Winds in Hi-Fi	Eastman Wind Ensemble with Frederick Fennell	1958	2003	
Mingus Ah Um	Charles Mingus	1959	2003	
New York Taxi Driver	Tony Schwartz	1959	2003	
Ali Akbar College of Music, Archive Selections		1960s–1970s	2003	
"Crazy"	Patsy Cline	1961	2003	
Kennedy Inauguration Ceremony	John F. Kennedy, Robert Frost, and others	January 20, 1961	2003	original
Judy at Carnegie Hall	Judy Garland	1961	2003	
"I've Been Loving You Too Long (To Stop Now)"	Otis Redding	1965	2003	
Sgt. Pepper's Lonely Hearts Club Band	The Beatles	1967	2003	
At Folsom Prison	Johnny Cash	1968	2003	
What's Going On	Marvin Gaye	1971	2003	
Tapestry	Carole King	1971	2003	
A Prairie Home Companion; First broadcast	Garrison Keillor	July 6, 1974	2003	
Born to Run	Bruce Springsteen	1975	2003	
Live at Yankee Stadium	Fania All-Stars	1975	2003	
"Gypsy Love Song"	Eugene Cowles	1898	2004	
"Some of These Days"	Sophie Tucker	1911	2004	
"The Castles in Europe One-Step (Castle House Rag)"	Europe's Society Orchestra	1914	2004	
"Swanee"	Al Jolson	1920	2004	
Armistice Day radio broadcast	Woodrow Wilson	November 10, 1923	2004	original
"See See Rider"	Gertrude "Ma" Rainey	1924	2004	
"Charleston"; Representative of the Edison Disc Master Mold Collection at the Edison National Historic Site	Golden Gate Orchestra	1925	2004	
"Fascinating Rhythm"	Fred and Adele Astaire; George Gershwin, piano	1926	2004	
NBC radio coverage of Charles A. Lindbergh's arrival and reception in Washington, D.C.		June 11, 1927	2004	copy
"Stardust"	Hoagy Carmichael	1927	2004	
"Blue Yodel No. 1 (T for Texas)"	Jimmie Rodgers	1927	2004	
"Ain't Misbehavin'"	Thomas "Fats" Waller	1929	2004	
"Gregorio Cortez"; Representative of the Arhoolie Foundation's Strachwitz Frontera Collection, University of California	Trovadores Regionales	1929	2004	
Piano Concerto No. 2 in C minor	Sergei Rachmaninoff, piano; Leopold Stokowski conducting the Philadelphia Orchestra	1929	2004	
"The Suncook Town Tragedy"	Mabel Wilson Tatro	July 1930	2004	
Oral narrative from the Lorenzo D. Turner Collection	Rosina Cohen	1932	2004	
"Stormy Weather"	Ethel Waters	1933	2004	
"Body and Soul"	Coleman Hawkins	1939	2004	
Peter and the Wolf (Sergey Prokofiev)	Serge Koussevitzky, conductor; Richard Hale, narrator; Boston Symphony Orchestra	1939	2004	
"In the Mood"	Glenn Miller and His Orchestra	1939	2004	
Broadcast from London	Edward R. Murrow	September 21, 1940	2004	copy
King James version of the Bible	Alexander Scourby	1940–1944, released 1966	2004	
We Hold These Truths	Norman Corwin	December 15, 1941	2004	original
Piano Concerto No. 1, op. 23, B♭ minor (Pyotr Ilyich Tchaikovsky)	Vladimir Horowitz, piano; Arturo Toscanini, conductor; NBC Symphony Orchestra	April 25, 1943	2004	
"Down by the Riverside"	Sister Rosetta Tharpe	1944	2004	
U.S. Highball (A Musical Account of a Transcontinental Hobo Trip)	Harry Partch, Gate 5 Ensemble	1946 (Note: The essay accompanying the U.S. Highball listing seems to concern the later 1958 Gate 5 recording.)	2004	
Four Saints in Three Acts; Original cast recording	Virgil Thomson and members of the original cast of the opera Four Saints in Three Acts	1947	2004	
"Manteca"	Dizzy Gillespie Big Band with Chano Pozo	1947	2004	
The Jack Benny Program	Jack Benny	March 28, 1948	2004	
"Foggy Mountain Breakdown"	Lester Flatt and Earl Scruggs	1949	2004	
"Lovesick Blues"	Hank Williams	1949	2004	
Guys and Dolls; Original Broadway cast recording	The original Broadway cast of Guys and Dolls	1950	2004	
"Old Soldiers Never Die" (Farewell Address to the United States Congress)	General Douglas MacArthur	April 19, 1951	2004	copy
Songs by Tom Lehrer	Tom Lehrer	1953	2004	
"Hoochie Coochie Man"	Muddy Waters	1954	2004	
"Earth Angel (Will You Be Mine)"	The Penguins	1954	2004	
Tuskegee Institute Choir Sings Spirituals	Tuskegee Institute Choir, directed by William L. Dawson	1955	2004	
Giant Steps	John Coltrane	1959	2004	
Messiah	Eugene Ormandy, conductor; Richard P. Condie, choir director; Mormon Tabernacle Choir; Philadelphia Orchestra	1959	2004	
Drums of Passion	Babatunde Olatunji	1960	2004	
Peace Be Still	James Cleveland	1962	2004	
"The Girl from Ipanema" (Garota de Ipanema)	Stan Getz, João Gilberto, Antônio Carlos Jobim, Astrud Gilberto	1963	2004	
Live at the Apollo	James Brown and The Famous Flames	1963	2004	
Pet Sounds	The Beach Boys	1966	2004	
Remarks broadcast from the Moon	Apollo 11 astronaut Neil Armstrong	July 21, 1969	2004	original
At Fillmore East	The Allman Brothers Band	1971	2004	
Star Wars (soundtrack) (Note: This recording is, or was made for, the soundtrack of a National Film Registry inductee.)	John Williams	1977	2004	
Recordings of Asian elephants	Katharine B. Payne	1984	2004	
Fear of a Black Planet	Public Enemy	1990	2004	
Nevermind	Nirvana	1991	2004	
"Canzone del Porter" from Martha by von Flotow; Representative of the Columbia Grand Opera Series	Édouard de Reszke	1903	2005	
"Listen to the Lambs"; Representative of the Hampton Quartet Collection, Hampton University	Hampton Quartette; recorded by Natalie Curtis Burlin	1917	2005	
"Over There"	Nora Bayes	1917	2005	
"Crazy Blues"	Mamie Smith	1920	2005	
"My Man" and "Second Hand Rose"	Fanny Brice	1921	2005	
"Ory's Creole Trombone"	Kid Ory	June 1922	2005	
Second inauguration of Calvin Coolidge	Calvin Coolidge	March 4, 1925	2005	
"Tanec Pid Werbamy (Dance Under the Willows)"	Pawlo Humeniuk	1926	2005	
"Singin' the Blues"	Frankie Trumbauer and His Orchestra with Bix Beiderbecke	1927	2005	
First official transatlantic telephone conversation	W.S. Gifford and Sir Evelyn P. Murray	January 27, 1927	2005	original
"El manisero (The Peanut Vendor)" (Two versions)	Rita Montaner, vocal with orchestra and Don Azpiazú and His Havana Casino Orchestra	1927 and 1930	2005	
Light's Golden Jubilee Celebration (Thomas Edison, honoree)	Graham McNamee, host; speeches by Herbert Hoover, Marie Curie, Henry Ford, Albert Einstein	October 21, 1929	2005	copy
Beethoven's Egmont Overture, Op. 84	Modesto High School Band	1930	2005	
Show Boat	Helen Morgan, Paul Robeson, James Melton and others; Victor Young, conductor; Louis Alter, piano	1932	2005	
"Wabash Cannonball"	Roy Acuff	1936	2005	
"One O'Clock Jump"	Count Basie and His Orchestra	1937	2005	
Columbia Workshop; Episode: The Fall of the City	Orson Welles, narrator; Burgess Meredith, Paul Stewart	April 11, 1937	2005	copy
The Adventures of Robin Hood radio broadcast	Erich Wolfgang Korngold, composer; Basil Rathbone, narrator	May 11, 1938	2005	
Joe Louis-Max Schmeling fight	Clem McCarthy, announcer	June 22, 1938	2005	
"John the Revelator"	Golden Gate Quartet	1938	2005	
"Adagio for Strings" (Samuel Barber)	Arturo Toscanini conducting the NBC Symphony Orchestra	November 5, 1938	2005	
Command Performance; Episode: No. 21	Bob Hope, master of ceremonies; Lena Horne; Ginny Simms; Les Baxter & His Orchestra; Rosalind Russell	July 7, 1942	2005	copy
"Straighten Up and Fly Right"	Nat King Cole	1943	2005	
The Fred Allen Show debut of Senator Claghorn	Fred Allen, Kenny Delmar	October 7, 1945	2005	
"Jole Blon (Jolie Blonde)"	Harry Choates	1946	2005	
Tubby the Tuba	Victor Jory & Léon Barzin	1946	2005	
"Move On Up a Little Higher"	Mahalia Jackson	1948	2005	
Anthology of American Folk Music	Edited by Harry Smith	1952	2005	
Damnation of Faust (Hector Berlioz)	Boston Symphony Orchestra with the Harvard Glee Club and Radcliffe Choral Society	1954	2005	
"Blueberry Hill"	Fats Domino	1956	2005	
Variations for Orchestra by Elliott Carter; Louisville Orchestra First Edition Recordings series	Louisville Orchestra conducted by Robert S. Whitney	1956	2005	
"Whole Lotta Shakin' Goin' On"	Jerry Lee Lewis	1957	2005	
"That'll Be the Day"	Buddy Holly and The Crickets	1957	2005	
Poème électronique	Edgard Varèse	1958	2005	
Time Out	The Dave Brubeck Quartet	1959	2005	
"Schooner Bradley" and/or "Clifton's Crew" (Note: Library of Congress sources conflict regarding the Pat Bonner recording(s) in the registry. The original press release names "Schooner Bradley", while the full registry list and an expanded essay name "Clifton's Crew". A list of available audio clips for registry titles includes both "Schooner Bradley" and "Clifton's Crew".); Representative of the Ivan Walton Collection at Bentley Library, University of Michigan	Pat Bonner	June 1960 (Note: Dates listed for the Pat Bonner selections include 1952–60, June 1960, and June 11, 1960, although the essay for "Clifton's Crew" says "the only known recording" was made August 24, 1938.)	2005	
United States Military Academy address	William Faulkner	April 19–20, 1962	2005	
Studs Terkel interview with James Baldwin; Representative of the Studs Terkel Collection at the Chicago History Museum (formerly the Chicago Historical Society)	Studs Terkel, James Baldwin	September 29, 1962	2005	
"Dancing in the Street"	Martha and the Vandellas	1964	2005	
Live at the Regal	B. B. King	1965	2005	
Are You Experienced	The Jimi Hendrix Experience	1967	2005	
We're Only in It for the Money	Frank Zappa and the Mothers of Invention	1968	2005	
Switched-On Bach	Wendy Carlos	1968	2005	
"Oh Happy Day"	Edwin Hawkins Singers	1969	2005	
Don't Crush That Dwarf, Hand Me the Pliers	The Firesign Theatre	1970	2005	
"The Revolution Will Not Be Televised"	Gil Scott-Heron	1971	2005	
Will the Circle Be Unbroken	Nitty Gritty Dirt Band	1972	2005	
The old foghorn, Kewaunee, Wisconsin	Recorded by James A. Lipsky	1972	2005	
Songs in the Key of Life	Stevie Wonder	1976	2005	
Daydream Nation	Sonic Youth	1988	2005	
"Uncle Josh and the Insurance Agent"	Cal Stewart	1904	2006	
"Il Mio Tesoro"	John McCormack; orchestra conducted by Walter Rogers	1916	2006	
National Defense Test	General John J. Pershing	September 12, 1924	2006	copy
"Black Bottom Stomp"	Jelly Roll Morton's Red Hot Peppers	1926	2006	
"Wildwood Flower"	Carter Family	1928	2006	
"Pony Blues"	Charley Patton	1929	2006	
"You're the Top"	Cole Porter	1934	2006	
The Lone Ranger; Episode: "The Osage Bank Robbery"	Earle Graser, John Todd	December 17, 1937	2006	
Native Brazilian Music	Pixinguinha, Donga, Cartola, José Espinguela and others; recording supervised by Leopold Stokowski	1940 (released 1942)	2006	
"Day of Infamy" speech to Congress	Franklin D. Roosevelt	December 8, 1941	2006	copy
"Peace in the Valley"	Red Foley and the Sunshine Boys	1951	2006	
"Polonaise in A Major" ("Polonaise militaire"), Op. 40, No. 1, by Frédéric Chopin	Arthur Rubinstein	1952	2006	
"Blue Suede Shoes"	Carl Perkins	1955	2006	
Interviews with William "Billy" Bell (Canadian-Irish northwoods work songs); Representative of the Edward D. Ives Collection at the Maine Folklife Center, University of Maine	Recorded by Edward D. "Sandy" Ives	1956	2006	
Howl	Allen Ginsberg	1959	2006	
The Button-Down Mind of Bob Newhart	Bob Newhart	1960	2006	
"Be My Baby"	The Ronettes	1963	2006	
We Shall Overcome	Pete Seeger	1963	2006	
"A Change Is Gonna Come"	Sam Cooke	1964	2006	
"(I Can't Get No) Satisfaction"	The Rolling Stones	1965	2006	
The Velvet Underground & Nico	The Velvet Underground and Nico	1967	2006	
The Eighty-Six Years of Eubie Blake	Eubie Blake	1969	2006	
Burnin'	The Wailers	1973	2006	
Live in Japan	Sarah Vaughan	1973	2006	
Graceland	Paul Simon	1986	2006	
The first transatlantic broadcast		March 14, 1925	2007	
"Allons à Lafayette"	Joe Falcon	1928	2007	
"Casta Diva" from Bellini's Norma	Rosa Ponselle and the Metropolitan Opera Orchestra and Chorus, conducted by Giulio Setti	December 31, 1928, and January 30, 1929	2007	
"If I Could Hear My Mother Pray Again"	Thomas A. Dorsey	1934	2007	
"Sweet Lorraine"	Art Tatum	1940	2007	
Fibber McGee and Molly; Fibber's closet opens for the first time	Jim Jordan, Marian Jordan	March 4, 1940	2007	
Wings Over Jordan		May 10, 1942	2007	
Fiorello H. La Guardia reading the comics	Fiorello H. La Guardia	1945	2007	
"Call It Stormy Monday (But Tuesday Is Just as Bad)"	T-Bone Walker	1947	2007	
Speech at the 1948 Democratic National Convention	Harry S. Truman	July 15, 1948	2007	
The Jazz Scene	Various artists, produced by Norman Granz	1949	2007	
"It Wasn't God Who Made Honky Tonk Angels"	Kitty Wells	1952	2007	
My Fair Lady; Original Broadway cast recording	Rex Harrison, Julie Andrews, and the original Broadway cast of My Fair Lady	1956	2007	
Navajo Shootingway ceremony field recordings Representative of the David McAllester Collection at Wesleyan University	Recorded by David P. McAllester; Ray Winnie and Diné Tsosi, singers	1957–1958	2007	
"Freight Train" and Other North Carolina Folk Songs and Tunes	Elizabeth Cotten	1959	2007	
United States Marine Band Recordings for the National Cultural Center		1963	2007	
"Oh, Pretty Woman"	Roy Orbison	1964	2007	
"The Tracks of My Tears"	Smokey Robinson and the Miracles	1965	2007	
You'll Sing a Song and I'll Sing a Song	Ella Jenkins	1966	2007	
Music from the Morning of the World	Various artists, recorded by David Lewiston	1966	2007	
For the Roses	Joni Mitchell	1972	2007	
Head Hunters	Herbie Hancock	1973	2007	
Ronald Reagan radio broadcasts	Ronald Reagan	1975–79	2007	
The Sounds of the Earth; Disc prepared for the Voyager spacecraft	compilation produced by Carl Sagan	1977	2007	
Thriller	Michael Jackson	1982	2007	
"No News, or What Killed the Dog"	Nat M. Wills	1908	2008	
Acoustic recordings for Victor Talking Machine Company	Jascha Heifetz	1917–1924	2008	
"Night Life"	Mary Lou Williams	1930	2008	
Sounds of the ivory-billed woodpecker	Recorded by Arthur Allen and Peter Paul Kellogg	1935	2008	
Gang Busters; First episode, broadcast under the title G-Men		July 20, 1935	2008	
"Bei Mir Bist Du Schoen"	The Andrews Sisters	1938	2008	
"O Que É Que A Baiana Tem?"	Carmen Miranda	1939	2008	
NBC Radio coverage of Marian Anderson's recital at the Lincoln Memorial	Marian Anderson	April 9, 1939	2008	
"Tom Dooley"	Frank Proffitt	1940	2008	
Mary Margaret McBride	Mary Margaret McBride and Zora Neale Hurston	January 25, 1943	2008	
"Uncle Sam Blues" (V-Disc)	Oran "Hot Lips" Page, accompanied by Eddie Condon's Jazz Band	1944	2008	
"Sinews of Peace" (Iron Curtain) Speech at Westminster College, Fulton, Missouri	Winston Churchill	March 5, 1946	2008	
The Churkendoose	Ray Bolger	1947	2008	
"Boogie Chillen'"	John Lee Hooker	1948	2008	
A Child's Christmas in Wales	Dylan Thomas	1952	2008	
A Festival of Lessons and Carols as Sung on Christmas Eve in King's College Chapel, Cambridge.	King's College Choir; Boris Ord, director	1954	2008	
West Side Story; Original Broadway cast recording	The original Broadway cast of West Side Story and the New York Philharmonic conducted by Leonard Bernstein	1957	2008	
"Tom Dooley"	The Kingston Trio	1958	2008	
"Rumble"	Link Wray	1958	2008	
The Play of Daniel: A Twelfth-Century Drama	New York Pro Musica under the direction of Noah Greenberg	1958	2008	
"Rank Stranger"	The Stanley Brothers	1960	2008	
"At Last"	Etta James	1961	2008	
2000 Years with Carl Reiner and Mel Brooks	Carl Reiner and Mel Brooks	1961	2008	
The Who Sings My Generation	The Who	1966	2008	
"He Stopped Loving Her Today"	George Jones	1980	2008	
"Fon der Choope (From the Wedding)"	Abe Elenkrig's Yidishe Orchestra	April 4, 1913	2009	
"Canal Street Blues"	King Oliver's Creole Jazz Band	April 5, 1923	2009	
Tristan und Isolde, NBC broadcast	Metropolitan Opera, featuring Kirsten Flagstad and Lauritz Melchior	March 9, 1935	2009	
"When You Wish Upon a Star"	Cliff Edwards	1938 (recorded) / 1940 (released)	2009	
America's Town Meeting of the Air: "Should Our Ships Convoy Materials to England?"	George V. Denny Jr. (host); Reinhold Niebuhr, John Flynn (guests)	May 8, 1941	2009	
The Library of Congress Marine Corps Combat Field Recording Collection, Second Battle of Guam	Alvin M. Josephy Jr., et al.	July 20 – August 11, 1944	2009	
"Evangeline Special" and "Love Bridge Waltz"	Iry LeJeune	1948	2009	
The Little Engine That Could	Paul Wing, narrator	1949	2009	
Leon Metcalf Collection of recordings of the First People of western Washington State	Leon Metcalf	1950–1954	2009	
"Tutti Frutti"	Little Richard	1955	2009	
"Smokestack Lightning"	Howlin' Wolf	1956	2009	
Gypsy; Original Broadway cast recording	Ethel Merman and the original Broadway cast of Gypsy	1959	2009	
"Daisy Bell (Bicycle Built for Two)"; First song sung with computer speech synthesis	Max Mathews	1961	2009	
The Complete Village Vanguard Recordings	Bill Evans Trio	June 25, 1961	2009	
I Started Out as a Child	Bill Cosby	1964	2009	
Azucar Pa' Ti	Eddie Palmieri	1965	2009	
Today!	Mississippi John Hurt	1966	2009	
Silver Apples of the Moon	Morton Subotnick	1967	2009	
Soul Folk in Action	The Staple Singers	1968	2009	
The Band	The Band	1969	2009	
"Coal Miner's Daughter"	Loretta Lynn	1970	2009	
Red Headed Stranger	Willie Nelson	1975	2009	
Horses	Patti Smith	1975	2009	
"Radio Free Europe" original Hib-Tone single	R.E.M.	1981	2009	
"Dear Mama"	2Pac	1995	2009	
Phonautograms	Édouard-Léon Scott de Martinville	ca. 1853–1861	2010	
"Take Me Out to the Ball Game"	Edward Meeker, accompanied by the Edison Orchestra	1908	2010	
Yahi language cylinder recordings	Ishi, last surviving member of the Yahi tribe	1911–1914	2010	
"Dark Was the Night, Cold Was the Ground"	Blind Willie Johnson	1927	2010	
"It's the Girl"	The Boswell Sisters with the Dorsey Brothers Orchestra	1931	2010	
"Mal Hombre"	Lydia Mendoza	1934	2010	
"Tumbling Tumbleweeds"	Sons of the Pioneers	1934	2010	
Talking Union	The Almanac Singers	1941	2010	
Jazz at the Philharmonic	Nat King Cole, Les Paul, Buddy Rich, others	July 2, 1944	2010	
Giovanni Pierluigi da Palestrina's "Pope Marcellus Mass"	Roger Wagner Chorale	1951	2010	
"The Eagle Stirreth Her Nest"	Reverend C. L. Franklin	1953	2010	
"Tipitina"	Professor Longhair	1953	2010	
At Sunset	Mort Sahl	1955	2010	
Interviews with jazz musicians for the Voice of America	Willis Conover	1955–56	2010	
The Music from Peter Gunn	Henry Mancini	1958	2010	
United Sacred Harp Musical Convention in Fyffe, Alabama	field recordings by Alan Lomax and Shirley Collins	1959	2010	
Blind Joe Death	John Fahey	1959, 1964, 1967	2010	
"Stand by Your Man"	Tammy Wynette	1968	2010	
Trout Mask Replica	Captain Beefheart and His Magic Band	1969	2010	
Songs of the Humpback Whale	Frank Watlington, Roger Payne, and others	1970	2010	
"Let's Stay Together"	Al Green	1971	2010	
Black Angels (Thirteen Images from the Dark Land) (George Crumb)	New York Strings Quartet	1972	2010	
Aja	Steely Dan	1977	2010	
GOPAC Strategy and Instructional Tapes	Newt Gingrich, others	1986–1994	2010	
3 Feet High and Rising	De La Soul	1989	2010	
Edison Talking Doll cylinder		1888	2011	
"Come Down Ma Evenin' Star"	Lillian Russell	1912	2011	
"Ten Cents a Dance"	Ruth Etting	1930	2011	
Voices from the Days of Slavery	Various	1932–1975	2011	
"I Want to Be a Cowboy's Sweetheart"	Patsy Montana	1935	2011	
"Fascinating Rhythm"	Sol Hoʻopiʻi	1938	2011	
"Artistry in Rhythm"	Stan Kenton	1943	2011	
New York Philharmonic debut of Leonard Bernstein	Leonard Bernstein	November 14, 1943	2011	
Hottest Women's Band of the 1940s	International Sweethearts of Rhythm	1944–1946 (released 1984)	2011	
"Hula Medley"	Gabby Pahinui	1947	2011	
Indians for Indians (Hour)	Don Whistler	March 25, 1947	2011	
I Can Hear It Now: 1933–1945	Edward R. Murrow and Fred W. Friendly	1948	2011	
"Let's Go Out to the Programs"	The Dixie Hummingbirds	1953	2011	
Also Sprach Zarathustra	Fritz Reiner and the Chicago Symphony Orchestra	1954, 1958	2011	
"Bo Diddley"/ "I'm a Man"	Bo Diddley	1955	2011	
Green Onions	Booker T. & the M.G.'s	1962	2011	
A Charlie Brown Christmas	Vince Guaraldi Trio	1965	2011	
Forever Changes	Love	1967	2011	
The Continental Harmony: The Gregg Smith Singers Perform Music of William Billings	Gregg Smith Singers	1969	2011	
"Coat of Many Colors"	Dolly Parton	1971	2011	
Mothership Connection	Parliament	1975	2011	
Barton Hall Concert at Cornell University	Grateful Dead	May 8, 1977	2011	
"I Feel Love"	Donna Summer	1977	2011	
"Rapper's Delight"	The Sugarhill Gang	1979	2011	
Purple Rain	Prince and The Revolution	1984	2011	
"After You've Gone"	Marion Harris	1918	2012	
"Bacon, Beans and Limousines"	Will Rogers	October 18, 1931	2012	
"Begin the Beguine"	Artie Shaw	1938	2012	
"You Are My Sunshine"	Jimmie Davis	1940	2012	
D-Day Radio Broadcast	George Hicks	June 5–6, 1944	2012	
"Just Because"	Frank Yankovic & His Yanks	1947	2012	
South Pacific; Original Broadway cast recording	Mary Martin, Ezio Pinza, and the original Broadway cast of South Pacific	1949	2012	
Descargas: Cuban Jam Sessions in Miniature	Cachao	1957	2012	
Tchaikovsky's Piano Concerto No. 1	Van Cliburn	April 11, 1958	2012	
President's Message Relayed from Atlas Satellite	Dwight D. Eisenhower	December 19, 1958	2012	
A Program of Song	Leontyne Price	1959	2012	
The Shape of Jazz to Come	Ornette Coleman	1959	2012	
"Crossing Chilly Jordan"	Blackwood Brothers	1960	2012	
"The Twist"	Chubby Checker	1960	2012	
Old Time Music at Clarence Ashley's	Clarence Ashley, Doc Watson, others	1960–1962	2012	
Hoodoo Man Blues	Junior Wells' Chicago Blues Band feat. Buddy Guy	1965	2012	
Sounds of Silence	Simon & Garfunkel	1966	2012	
Cheap Thrills	Big Brother and the Holding Company	1968	2012	
The Dark Side of the Moon	Pink Floyd	1973	2012	
Music Time In Africa; Episode: "Mauritania" (premiere episode)	Leo Sarkisian	July 29, 1973	2012	
The Wild Tchoupitoulas	The Wild Tchoupitoulas	1976	2012	
Ramones	Ramones	1976	2012	
Saturday Night Fever Soundtrack	Bee Gees, et al.	1977	2012	
Einstein on the Beach	Philip Glass and Robert Wilson	1979	2012	
The Audience with Betty Carter	Betty Carter	1980	2012	
"The Laughing Song"	George W. Johnson	c. 1896	2013	
"They Didn't Believe Me"	Harry Macdonough and Alice Green	1915	2013	
"Brother, Can You Spare a Dime?" (Two Versions)	Bing Crosby and Rudy Vallée	1932	2013	
Recordings of Kwakwaka'wakw Chief Dan Cranmer	Franz Boas and George Herzog	1938	2013	
"Were You There"	Roland Hayes	1940	2013	
The Goldbergs; Episode: "Sammy Goes to the Army"	Gertrude Berg and cast	July 9, 1942	2013	
"Caldonia"	Louis Jordan and His Tympany Five	1945	2013	
"Dust My Broom"	Elmore James	1951	2013	
A Night at Birdland (Vols. 1 & 2)	Art Blakey	1954	2013	
"When I Stop Dreaming"	The Louvin Brothers	1955	2013	
"Cathy's Clown"	The Everly Brothers	1960	2013	
Texas Sharecropper and Songster	Mance Lipscomb	1960	2013	
The First Family	Vaughn Meader	1962	2013	
Lawrence Ritter's Interviews with Baseball Pioneers of the Late 19th and Early 20th Century	Lawrence Ritter	1962–1966	2013	
Presidential Recordings of Lyndon B. Johnson	Lyndon B. Johnson	1963–1969	2013	
Carnegie Hall Concert with Buck Owens and His Buckaroos	Buck Owens and His Buckaroos	1966	2013	
"Fortunate Son"	Creedence Clearwater Revival	1969	2013	
Shaft	Isaac Hayes	1971	2013	
Only Visiting This Planet	Larry Norman	1972	2013	
Celia & Johnny	Celia Cruz and Johnny Pacheco	1974	2013	
Copland Conducts Copland: Appalachian Spring	Aaron Copland	1974	2013	
Heart Like a Wheel	Linda Ronstadt	1974	2013	
Sweeney Todd: The Demon Barber of Fleet Street; Original Broadway cast recording	The original Broadway cast of Sweeney Todd: The Demon Barber of Fleet Street	1979	2013	
The Joshua Tree	U2	1987	2013	
"Hallelujah"	Jeff Buckley	1994	2013	
The Vernacular Wax Cylinder Recordings at University of California, Santa Barbara Library	University of California, Santa Barbara	1890–1910	2014	
The Benjamin Ives Gilman Collection, recorded at the 1893 World's Columbian Exposition at Chicago	Benjamin Ives Gilman	1893	2014	
"The Boys of the Lough"/"The Humours of Ennistymon"	Michael Coleman	1922	2014	
"That Black Snake Moan"/ "Matchbox Blues"	Blind Lemon Jefferson	1928	2014	
Suspense; Episode: "Sorry, Wrong Number"	Agnes Moorehead	May 25, 1943	2014	
"Ac-Cent-Tchu-Ate the Positive"	Johnny Mercer	1944	2014	
Radio Coverage of President Franklin D. Roosevelt's Funeral	Arthur Godfrey, et al.	April 14, 1945	2014	
Kiss Me, Kate; Original Broadway cast recording	Cole Porter, Alfred Drake, Patricia Morison, and the original Broadway cast of Kiss Me, Kate	1949	2014	
John Brown's Body	Tyrone Power, Judith Anderson, and Raymond Massey; directed by Charles Laughton	1953	2014	
"My Funny Valentine"; May 20, 1953, live recording	The Gerry Mulligan Quartet featuring Chet Baker	1953	2014	
"Sixteen Tons"	Tennessee Ernie Ford	1955	2014	
"Mary Don't You Weep"	Swan Silvertones	1959	2014	
Joan Baez	Joan Baez	1960	2014	
"Stand By Me"	Ben E. King	1961	2014	
New Orleans' Sweet Emma Barrett and her Preservation Hall Jazz Band	Sweet Emma Barrett and her Preservation Hall Jazz Band	1964	2014	
"You've Lost That Lovin' Feelin'"	The Righteous Brothers	1964	2014	
The Doors	The Doors	1967	2014	
Lincoln Mayorga and Distinguished Colleagues (formerly known as Sheffield S9)	Lincoln Mayorga	1968 (released 1971)	2014	
Stand!	Sly and the Family Stone	1969	2014	
A Wild and Crazy Guy	Steve Martin	1978	2014	
Sesame Street: Platinum All-Time Favorites	Various	1995	2014	
OK Computer	Radiohead	1997	2014	
Old Regular Baptists: Lined-Out Hymnody from Southeastern Kentucky	Indian Bottom Association	1997	2014	
The Miseducation of Lauryn Hill	Lauryn Hill	1998	2014	
Fanfare for the Uncommon Woman	Colorado Symphony, Marin Alsop, conductor; Joan Tower, composer	1999	2014	
"Let Me Call You Sweetheart"	Peerless Quartet	1911	2015	
"Wild Cat Blues"	Clarence Williams' Blue Five	1923	2015	
"Statesboro Blues"	Blind Willie McTell	1928	2015	
"Bonaparte's Retreat"; Representative of Alan and Elizabeth Lomax's 1937 Kentucky recordings	W. H. Stepp	1937	2015	
Vic and Sade; Episode: "Decoration Day Parade"		May 28, 1937	2015	
Mahler: Symphony No. 9	Vienna Philharmonic; Bruno Walter, conductor	1938	2015	
Carousel of American Music	George M. Cohan, Irving Berlin, Johnny Mercer, Arthur Freed, Shelton Brooks, Hoagy Carmichael, others	September 24, 1940	2015	
The Marshall Plan Speech	George C. Marshall	June 5, 1947	2015	copy
Destination Freedom; Episodes: "A Garage in Gainesville" and "Execution Awaited"	Richard Durham	September 25 and October 2, 1949	2015	
A Streetcar Named Desire soundtrack	Alex North	1951	2015	
"Cry Me a River"	Julie London	1955	2015	
"Mack the Knife" (Two Versions)	Louis Armstrong and Bobby Darin	1956 and 1959	2015	
Fourth-quarter radio coverage of Wilt Chamberlain's 100-point game	Bill Campbell, announcer	March 2, 1962	2015	
A Love Supreme	John Coltrane	1964	2015	
It's My Way!	Buffy Sainte-Marie	1964	2015	
"Where Did Our Love Go"	The Supremes	1964	2015	
"People Get Ready"	The Impressions	1965	2015	
"Mama Tried"	Merle Haggard	1968	2015	
Abraxas	Santana	1970	2015	
Class Clown	George Carlin	1972	2015	
Robert and Clara Schumann Complete Piano Trios	Beaux Arts Trio	1972	2015	
"Piano Man"	Billy Joel	1973	2015	
Bogalusa Boogie	Clifton Chenier	1976	2015	
"I Will Survive"	Gloria Gaynor	1978	2015	
Master of Puppets	Metallica	1986	2015	
1888 London cylinder recordings of Col. George Gouraud	George Gouraud	1888	2016	
"Lift Every Voice and Sing" (Two Versions)	Manhattan Harmony Four and Melba Moore & Friends	1923 and 1990	2016	
"Puttin' On the Ritz"	Harry Richman	1929	2016	
"Over the Rainbow"	Judy Garland	1939	2016	
"I'll Fly Away"	The Chuck Wagon Gang	1948	2016	
"Hound Dog"	Big Mama Thornton	1952	2016	
Saxophone Colossus	Sonny Rollins	1956	2016	
New York Giants vs. Brooklyn Dodgers final game commentary	Vin Scully	September 8, 1957	2016	
Gunfighter Ballads and Trail Songs	Marty Robbins	1959	2016	
The Incredible Jazz Guitar of Wes Montgomery	Wes Montgomery	1960	2016	
People	Barbra Streisand	1964	2016	
"In the Midnight Hour"	Wilson Pickett	1965	2016	
"Amazing Grace"	Judy Collins	1970	2016	
All Things Considered first broadcast	National Public Radio	May 3, 1971	2016	
"American Pie"	Don McLean	1971	2016	
The Rise and Fall of Ziggy Stardust and the Spiders from Mars	David Bowie	1972	2016	
The Wiz; Original Broadway cast recording	The original Broadway cast of The Wiz	1975	2016	
Their Greatest Hits (1971–1975)	Eagles	1976	2016	
Scott Joplin's Treemonisha	Gunther Schuller, arr.	1976	2016	
Wanted: Live in Concert	Richard Pryor	1978	2016	
"We Are Family"	Sister Sledge	1979	2016	
Remain in Light	Talking Heads	1980	2016	
Straight Outta Compton	N.W.A	1988	2016	
Rachmaninoff's Vespers (All-Night Vigil)	The Robert Shaw Festival Singers	1990	2016	
Signatures	Renée Fleming	1997	2016	
"Dream Melody Intermezzo: Naughty Marietta"	Victor Herbert and his Orchestra	1911	2017	
Standing Rock Preservation Recordings	George Herzog and Members of the Yanktoni Tribe	1928	2017	
"Lamento Borincano"	written by Rafael Hernández Marín performed by Canario y Su Grupo (including Davilita on lead vocals)	1930	2017	
"Sitting on Top of the World"	Mississippi Sheiks	1930	2017	
The Complete Beethoven Piano Sonatas	Artur Schnabel	1932–1935	2017	
"If I Didn't Care"	The Ink Spots	1939	2017	
Proceedings of the United Nations Conference on International Organization		April 25 – June 26, 1945	2017	
Folk Songs of the Hills	Merle Travis	1946	2017	
"How I Got Over"	Clara Ward and the Ward Singers	1950	2017	
"(We're Gonna) Rock Around the Clock"	Bill Haley & His Comets	1954	2017	
Calypso	Harry Belafonte	1956	2017	
"I Left My Heart in San Francisco"	Tony Bennett	1962	2017	
"My Girl"	The Temptations	1964	2017	
King Biscuit Time	Sonny Boy Williamson II and others	1965	2017	
The Sound of Music soundtrack	Various	1965	2017	
"Alice's Restaurant Massacree"	Arlo Guthrie	1967	2017	
New Sounds in Electronic Music	Steve Reich, Richard Maxfield, Pauline Oliveros	1967	2017	
An Evening with Groucho	Groucho Marx	1972	2017	
Rumours	Fleetwood Mac	1977	2017	
"The Gambler"	Kenny Rogers	1978	2017	
"Le Freak"	Chic	1978	2017	
"Footloose"	Kenny Loggins	1984	2017	
Raising Hell	Run-DMC	1986	2017	
"Rhythm Is Gonna Get You"	Gloria Estefan and Miami Sound Machine	1987	2017	
Yo-Yo Ma Premieres: Concertos for Violoncello and Orchestra	Yo-Yo Ma & the Philadelphia Orchestra performing Christopher Rouse, Leon Kirchner, and Richard Danielpour	1996	2017	
Yiddish Cylinders from the Standard Phonograph Company of New York and the Thomas Lambert Company		c. 1901–1905	2018	
"The Memphis Blues"	Victor Military Band	1914	2018	
Melville Jacobs Collection of Native Americans of the American Northwest	Melville Jacobs	1929–1939	2018	
"Minnie the Moocher"	Cab Calloway	1931	2018	
Bach Six Cello Suites	Pablo Casals	1936–1939	2018	
"They Look Like Men of War"	Deep River Boys	1941	2018	
Gunsmoke; Episode: "The Cabin"	William Conrad and cast	December 27, 1952	2018	
Complete Recorded Monologues	Ruth Draper	1954–1956	2018	
"La Bamba"	Ritchie Valens	1958	2018	
"Long Black Veil"	Lefty Frizzell	1959	2018	
Stan Freberg Presents the United States of America Volume One: The Early Years	Stan Freberg	1961	2018	
Go	Dexter Gordon	1962	2018	
War Requiem	Benjamin Britten	1963	2018	
"Mississippi Goddam"	Nina Simone	1964	2018	
"Soul Man"	Sam & Dave	1967	2018	
Hair; Original Broadway cast recording	The original Broadway cast of Hair	1968	2018	
Robert F. Kennedy's speech on the assassination of Martin Luther King Jr.	Robert F. Kennedy	April 4, 1968	2018	
"Sweet Caroline"	Neil Diamond	1969	2018	
Super Fly	Curtis Mayfield	1972	2018	
Ola Belle Reed	Ola Belle Reed	1973	2018	
"September"	Earth, Wind & Fire	1978	2018	
"You Make Me Feel (Mighty Real)"	Sylvester	1978	2018	
She's So Unusual	Cyndi Lauper	1983	2018	
Schoolhouse Rock!: The Box Set	Various	1996	2018	
The Blueprint	Jay-Z	2001	2018	
"Whispering"	Paul Whiteman and his Orchestra	1920	2019	
"Protesta per Sacco e Vanzetti"/"Sacco e Vanzetti"	Compagnia Columbia; Raoul Romito	1927	2019	
"La Chicharronera"	Narciso Martínez and Santiago Almeida	1936	2019	
Arch Oboler's Plays; Episode: "The Bathysphere"		November 18, 1939	2019	
"Me and My Chauffeur Blues"	Memphis Minnie	1941	2019	
The 1951 National League Tiebreaker: New York Giants vs. Brooklyn Dodgers	Russ Hodges, announcer	October 3, 1951	2019	
Tosca (Puccini)	Victor de Sabata, conductor, with Maria Callas, Giuseppe Di Stefano and others	1953	2019	
"Hello Muddah, Hello Faddah"	Allan Sherman	1963	2019	
WGBH broadcast of the Boston Symphony on the day of the John F. Kennedy assassination	Boston Symphony Orchestra	November 22, 1963	2019	
Fiddler on the Roof; Original Broadway Cast recording	Zero Mostel and the original Broadway cast of Fiddler on the Roof	1964	2019	
"Make the World Go Away"	Eddy Arnold	1965	2019	
Hiromi Lorraine Sakata collection of Afghan traditional music	Recorded by Hiromi Lorraine Sakata	1966–67, 1971–73	2019	
"Wichita Lineman"	Glen Campbell	1968	2019	
Dusty in Memphis	Dusty Springfield	1969	2019	
Mister Rogers Sings 21 Favorite Songs from "Mister Rogers' Neighborhood"	Fred Rogers	1973	2019	
Cheap Trick at Budokan	Cheap Trick	1978	2019	
Suite No. 1 in E flat, Suite No. 2 in F (Holst) / Music for the Royal Fireworks (Handel) / Fantasia in G (Bach); Special edition audiophile pressing	Frederick Fennell and the Cleveland Symphonic Winds	1978	2019	
"Y.M.C.A."	Village People	1978	2019	
A Feather on the Breath of God	Gothic Voices; Christopher Page, conductor; Hildegard von Bingen, composer	1981/2 (released 1985)	2019	
Private Dancer	Tina Turner	1984	2019	
Ven Conmigo	Selena	1990	2019	
The Chronic	Dr. Dre	1992	2019	
"I Will Always Love You"	Whitney Houston	1992	2019	
Concert in the Garden	Maria Schneider Orchestra	2004	2019	
Percussion Concerto (Higdon)	Colin Currie	2008	2019	
"St. Louis tinfoil" recording	Thomas Edison	1878	2020	
"Nikolina"	Hjalmar Peterson	1917	2020	
"Smyrneikos Balos"	Marika Papagika	1928	2020	
"When the Saints Go Marching In"	Louis Armstrong & His Orchestra	1938	2020	
Christmas Eve broadcast	Franklin D. Roosevelt and Winston Churchill	December 24, 1941	2020	
The Guiding Light; Episode: November 22, 1945		November 22, 1945	2020	
Odetta Sings Ballads and Blues	Odetta	1957	2020	
"Lord, Keep Me Day by Day"	Albertina Walker and the Caravans	1959	2020	
Roger Maris hits his 61st home run	Phil Rizzuto	October 1, 1961	2020	
Aida	Leontyne Price, et al.	1962	2020	
"Once a Day"	Connie Smith	1964	2020	
Born Under a Bad Sign	Albert King	1967	2020	
Free to Be ... You & Me	Marlo Thomas and Friends	1972	2020	
The Harder They Come	Jimmy Cliff	1972	2020	
"Lady Marmalade"	Labelle	1974	2020	
Late for the Sky	Jackson Browne	1974	2020	
Bright Size Life	Pat Metheny	1976	2020	
"Rainbow Connection"	Kermit the Frog (Jim Henson)	1979	2020	
"Celebration"	Kool & the Gang	1980	2020	
Richard Strauss: Four Last Songs	Jessye Norman	1983	2020	
"Somewhere Over the Rainbow/What a Wonderful World"	Israel Kamakawiwo'ole	1988, released 1993	2020	
Rhythm Nation 1814	Janet Jackson	1989	2020	
Partners	Flaco Jiménez	1992	2020	
Illmatic	Nas	1994	2020	
This American Life: "The Giant Pool of Money"	Ira Glass, Adam Davidson & Alex Blumberg	May 9, 2008	2020	
"Harlem Strut"	James P. Johnson	1921	2022 (Note: The class of 2022 saw a shift with the current calendar year being cited as the "induction year", as opposed to the previous year. Consequently, 2021 was skipped over.)	
Complete presidential speeches	Franklin D. Roosevelt	1933–1945	2022	
"Walking the Floor Over You"	Ernest Tubb	1941	2022	
On a Note of Triumph	Norman Corwin	May 8, 1945	2022	
"Jesus Gave Me Water"	The Soul Stirrers	1950	2022	
Ellington at Newport	Duke Ellington	1956	2022	
We Insist!	Max Roach	1960	2022	
"The Christmas Song"; 1961 stereo recording	Nat King Cole	1961	2022	
Tonight's the Night	The Shirelles	1961	2022	
"Moon River"	Andy Williams	1962	2022	
"It's a Small World (After All)"	Disneyland Boys Choir	1964	2022	
"Reach Out I'll Be There"	Four Tops	1966	2022	
In C	Terry Riley	1968	2022	
Hank Aaron's 715th career home run	Milo Hamilton	April 8, 1974	2022	
"Bohemian Rhapsody"	Queen	1975	2022	
"Don't Stop Believin'"	Journey	1981	2022	
Canciones de Mi Padre	Linda Ronstadt	1987	2022	
Nick of Time	Bonnie Raitt	1989	2022	
The Low End Theory	A Tribe Called Quest	1991	2022	
Enter the Wu-Tang (36 Chambers)	Wu-Tang Clan	1993	2022	
Buena Vista Social Club	Buena Vista Social Club	1997	2022	
"Livin' la Vida Loca"	Ricky Martin	1999	2022	
Songs in A Minor	Alicia Keys	2001	2022	
Broadcasts for the day of 9/11	WNYC	September 11, 2001	2022	
WTF with Marc Maron; Episode 67: "Robin Williams"	Marc Maron and Robin Williams	April 26, 2010	2022	
El Periquito (Note: Listed by the compilation subtitle The Very First Mariachi Recordings in the Library of Congress press release, but as El Periquito on the 2023 class page.)	Cuarteto Coculense	1907–1909 (reissued 1998)	2023	
"St. Louis Blues"	Handy's Memphis Blues Band	1922	2023	
"Sugar Foot Stomp"	Fletcher Henderson	1925	2023	
Commentary and analysis of the European situation for NBC Radio	Dorothy Thompson	Aug. 23 – September 6, 1939	2023	
"Don't Let Nobody Turn You Around"	The Fairfield Four	1947	2023	
"Sherry"	The Four Seasons	1962	2023	
"What the World Needs Now is Love"	Jackie DeShannon	1965	2023	
"Wang Dang Doodle"	Koko Taylor	1966	2023	
"Ode to Billie Joe"	Bobbie Gentry	1967	2023	
Déjà Vu	Crosby, Stills, Nash and Young	1970	2023	
"Imagine"	John Lennon	1971	2023	
"Stairway to Heaven"	Led Zeppelin	1971	2023	
"Take Me Home, Country Roads"	John Denver	1971	2023	
"Margaritaville"	Jimmy Buffett	1977	2023	
"Flashdance…What a Feeling"	Irene Cara	1983	2023	
"Sweet Dreams (Are Made of This)"	Eurythmics	1983	2023	
Synchronicity	The Police	1983	2023	
Like a Virgin	Madonna	1984; 1985 reissue	2023	
Black Codes (From the Underground)	Wynton Marsalis	1985	2023	
Super Mario Bros. theme	Koji Kondo	1985	2023	
All Hail the Queen	Queen Latifah	1989	2023	
"All I Want for Christmas is You"	Mariah Carey	1994	2023	
Pale Blue Dot; Audiobook	Carl Sagan	1994	2023	
"Gasolina"	Daddy Yankee	2004	2023	
Concerto for Clarinet and Chamber Orchestra (Zwilich)	Chamber Music Northwest	2012	2023	
"Clarinet Marmalade"	Lt. James Reese Europe's 369th U.S. Infantry Band	1919	2024	
"Kauhavan Polkka"	Viola Turpeinen and John Rosendahl	1928	2024	
Wisconsin Folksong Collection		1937–1946	2024	
"Rose Room"	Benny Goodman Sextet with Charlie Christian	1939	2024	
"Rudolph, the Red-Nosed Reindeer"	Gene Autry	1949	2024	
"Tennessee Waltz"	Patti Page	1950	2024	
"Rocket 88"	Jackie Brenston and his Delta Cats	1951	2024	
"Catch a Falling Star"/"Magic Moments"	Perry Como	1957	2024	
"Chances Are"	Johnny Mathis	1957	2024	
The Sidewinder	Lee Morgan	1964	2024	
Surrealistic Pillow	Jefferson Airplane	1967	2024	
"Ain't No Sunshine"	Bill Withers	1971	2024	
This Is a Recording	Lily Tomlin	1971	2024	
J. D. Crowe & The New South	J. D. Crowe and The New South	1975	2024	
Arrival	ABBA	1976	2024	
"El Cantante"	Héctor Lavoe	1978	2024	
The Cars	The Cars	1978	2024	
Parallel Lines	Blondie	1978	2024	
"La Di Da Di"	Doug E. Fresh and MC Ricky D	1985	2024	
"Don't Worry, Be Happy"	Bobby McFerrin	1988	2024	
"Amor eterno"	Juan Gabriel	1990	2024	
Pieces of Africa	Kronos Quartet	1992	2024	
Dookie	Green Day	1994	2024	
Ready to Die	The Notorious B.I.G.	1994	2024	
Wide Open Spaces	The Chicks	1998	2024	
"Aloha 'Oe"	Hawaiian Quintette	1913	2025	
"Sweet Georgia Brown"	Brother Bones and His Shadows	1949	2025	
"Happy Trails"	Roy Rogers and Dale Evans	1952	2025	
Radio Broadcast of Game 7 of the 1960 World Series	Chuck Thompson, announcer	October 13, 1960	2025	
Harry Urata field recordings		1960–1980	2025	
Hello Dummy!	Don Rickles	1968	2025	
Chicago Transit Authority	Chicago	1969	2025	
Bitches Brew	Miles Davis	1970	2025	
"Kiss an Angel Good Mornin'"	Charley Pride	1971	2025	
"I Am Woman"	Helen Reddy	1972	2025	
"El Rey"	Vicente Fernández	1973	2025	
Goodbye Yellow Brick Road	Elton John	1973	2025	
Nimrod Workman Collection		1973–1994	2025	
"Before the Next Teardrop Falls"	Freddy Fender	1975	2025	
I've Got the Music in Me	Thelma Houston	1975	2025	
The Köln Concert	Keith Jarrett	1975	2025	
Fly Like an Eagle	Steve Miller Band	1976	2025	
Tracy Chapman	Tracy Chapman	1988	2025	
My Life	Mary J. Blige	1994	2025	
"The Microsoft Sound"	Brian Eno	1995	2025	
"My Heart Will Go On"	Celine Dion	1997	2025	
Our American Journey	Chanticleer	2002	2025	
Back to Black	Amy Winehouse	2006	2025	
Minecraft – Volume Alpha	C418 (Daniel Rosenfeld)	2011	2025	
Hamilton; Original Broadway cast recording	Original Broadway Cast	2015	2025	
"Cocktails for Two"	Spike Jones and His City Slickers	1944	2026	
"Mambo No. 5"	Pérez Prado and His Orchestra	1950	2026	
"Teardrops from My Eyes"	Ruth Brown	1950	2026	
"Fly Me to the Moon"	Kaye Ballard	1954	2026	
"Put Your Head on My Shoulder"	Paul Anka	1959	2026	
The Blues and the Abstract Truth	Oliver Nelson	1961	2026	
Modern Sounds in Country and Western Music	Ray Charles	1962	2026	
"Turn! Turn! Turn!"	The Byrds	1965	2026	
"Amen, Brother"	The Winstons	1969	2026	
"Feliz Navidad"	José Feliciano	1970	2026	
Fight of the Century: Muhammad Ali vs. Joe Frazier; Radio broadcast	Van Patrick and Charles King, announcers	March 8, 1971	2026	
"Midnight Train to Georgia"	Gladys Knight & the Pips	1973	2026	
Chicago; Original Broadway cast recording	Original Broadway Cast	1975	2026	
"The Devil Went Down to Georgia"	Charlie Daniels Band	1979	2026	
Beauty and the Beat	The Go-Go's	1981	2026	
Texas Flood	Stevie Ray Vaughan and Double Trouble	1983	2026	
"I Feel for You"	Chaka Khan	1984	2026	
"Your Love"	Jamie Principle (original)/Frankie Knuckles (rework)	1986/1987	2026	
Rumor Has It	Reba McEntire	1990	2026	
The Wheel	Rosanne Cash	1993	2026	
Doom soundtrack	Bobby Prince	1993	2026	
"Go Rest High on That Mountain"	Vince Gill	1994	2026	
Weezer (Blue Album)	Weezer	1994	2026	
"Single Ladies (Put a Ring on It)"	Beyoncé	2008	2026	
1989	Taylor Swift	2014	2026	

== Statistics ==
As of 2025, the oldest recording on the list is Edouard-Leon Scott de Martinville's Phonautograms, which date back to the 1850s. The most recent is the original Broadway cast recording of Hamilton from 2015.

Selections vary widely in duration. The early Edison recordings, the instrumental "Rumble" by Link Wray, "Rock Around the Clock" by Bill Haley and His Comets, and the Super Mario Bros. theme by Koji Kondo each clock in at under three minutes. The Edison "Talking Doll" cylinder is only 17 seconds long, "The Microsoft Sound" by Brian Eno lasts 6 seconds and some of Scott de Martinville's Phonautographs are just as brief. Meanwhile, Georg Solti's recording of Wagner's complete Ring Cycle is approximately 15 hours in duration, Alexander Scourby's recitation of the King James Bible is over 80 hours, and Lyndon B. Johnson's recordings are nearly 850 hours in length.

Two significant podcast episodes are included: "The Giant Pool of Money" from This American Life (focusing on the subprime mortgage crisis causing the Great Recession) and the Robin Williams interview from WTF with Marc Maron (before his death from suicide in 2014).

The Super Mario Bros. theme was the first piece of video game music to be selected for the Registry.

== Multiple entries ==
The following list contains the names of people credited on more than one entry, whether as a performer, composer, writer, or producer.

List of names
- Roy Acuff: Grand Ole Opry debut, "Wabash Cannonball", and performing "The Precious Jewel", "Pins and Needles (In My Heart)", "Wreck on the Highway", and "I Saw the Light" on Will the Circle Be Unbroken
- Harold Arlen: "Over the Rainbow" (both Judy Garland and Israel Kamakawiwoʻole versions), "Ac-Cent-Tchu-Ate the Positive" (Johnny Mercer), "Stormy Weather" (Ethel Waters), "Over the Rainbow" on Carousel of American Music (Garland) and on Live in Japan (Sarah Vaughan), "Don't Like Goodbyes" (from House of Flowers) on People (Barbra Streisand), and "Over the Rainbow", "The Man That Got Away", "Come Rain or Come Shine", and "Stormy Weather" on Judy at Carnegie Hall
- Marin Alsop: Fanfare for the Uncommon Woman (Joan Tower, conductor) and Percussion Concerto (Jennifer Higdon, conductor)
- Marian Anderson: 1939 recital at the Lincoln Memorial and "He's Got the Whole World in His Hands"
- Julie Andrews: The Sound of Music (film soundtrack) and My Fair Lady (original Broadway cast)
- Paul Anka: "Put Your Head on My Shoulder", and "It Doesn't Matter Anymore" on Heart Like a Wheel (Linda Ronstadt)
- Louis Armstrong: Hot Five and Hot Seven recordings, "When the Saints Go Marching In", "Mack the Knife", "Canal Street Blues" (King Oliver's Creole Jazz Band), and "Melancholy Blues" on Murmurs of Earth
- Eddy Arnold: "Make the World Go Away" (single), "I Couldn't Believe it Was True" on Red Headed Stranger (Willie Nelson), and "You Don't Know Me" and "Just a Little Lovin' (Will Go a Long Way)" on Modern Sounds in Country and Western Music (Ray Charles)
- Clarence Ashley: "The House Carpenter" and "The Coo Coo Bird" on Anthology of American Folk Music and Old Time Music at Clarence Ashley's
- Johann Sebastian Bach: Mass in B minor (Robert Shaw Chorale), Switched-On Bach (Wendy Carlos), Fantasia in G (Frederick Fennell and the Cleveland Symphonic Winds), Cello Suites (Pablo Casals), Goldberg Variations (Glenn Gould), "Brandenburg Concerto No.2", "Prelude and Fugue in C major", and "Partita for Violin No. 3" on Murmurs of Earth (Karl Richter and the Munich Bach Orchestra, Glenn Gould, and Arthur Grumiaux, respectively), and the invitatory of A Festival of Lessons and Carols as Sung on Christmas Eve in King's College Chapel, Cambridge (The King's College Choir)
- Ludwig van Beethoven: Kreutzer Sonata (Béla Bartók and Joseph Szigeti), Complete String Quartets (Budapest Quartet), Egmont Overture (Modesto High School Band), Complete Piano Sonatas (Artur Schnabel), the first movement of Symphony No.5 on Murmurs of Earth (Otto Klemperer), "Marcia funebre" (Boston Symphony Orchestra, on the death of John F. Kennedy), "Für Elise" on A Charlie Brown Christmas (Vince Guaraldi), and "A Fifth of Beethoven" on Saturday Night Fever (adaptation of Symphony No.5 by Walter Murphy)
- Harry Belafonte: Calypso and Free to Be... You and Me (with Marlo Thomas)
- Irving Berlin: "God Bless America" (Kate Smith), "Puttin' On the Ritz" (Harry Richman), "White Christmas" (Bing Crosby), "Blue Skies" on Carnegie Hall Jazz Concert (Benny Goodman), "God Bless America" on Carousel of American Music (self), "Puttin' On the Ritz" on Judy at Carnegie Hall (Judy Garland), "Supper Time" on People (Barbra Streisand), and "Get Thee Behind Me Satan" on Talking Union (The Almanac Singers)
- Leonard Bernstein: debut at the New York Philharmonic, West Side Story (original Broadway cast), performing David Diamond's "Prelude and fugue, no. 3" on the New Music Quarterly Recordings Series, and "Some Other Time" (from On the Town) on The Complete Village Vanguard Recordings (Bill Evans Trio)
- Chuck Berry: "Roll Over Beethoven", and "Johnny B. Goode" on Murmurs of Earth
- William Billings: The Continental Harmony (Gregg Smith Singers) and "David's Lamentation" on Our American Journey (Chanticleer)
- Boston Symphony Orchestra: Peter and the Wolf (Sergei Prokofiev; with Serge Koussevitzky, conductor, and Richard Hale, narrator), The Damnation of Faust (Berlioz; with Harvard Glee Club and the Radcliffe Choral Society), and "Marcia Funebre" (Beethoven; with Erich Leinsdorf, conductor) on the death of John F. Kennedy
- Bertolt Brecht: "Mack the Knife" (both versions by Louis Armstrong and Bobby Darin) and on Saxophone Colossus (Sonny Rollins) and "Alabama Song" on The Doors (The Doors)
- Benjamin Britten: War Requiem and arias from Peter Grimes on Signatures (Renée Fleming)
- Jackson Browne: Late for the Sky, and "Take It Easy" on Their Greatest Hits (1971–1975) (The Eagles)
- Irving Caesar: "Swanee" (Al Jolson), "Swanee" on Judy at Carnegie Hall (Judy Garland), "You're a Real Sweetheart" on the Hot Five and Hot Seven Sessions (Louis Armstrong and His Hot Five), and"I Want to Be Happy" on The Jazz Scene (Lester Young)
- Hoagy Carmichael: "Stardust" (single), "Stardust" and "Little Old Lady" on Carousel of American Music, and "The Nearness of You" on Live in Japan (Sarah Vaughan),
- The Carter Family: "Wildwood Flower" (single), "John Hardy Was a Desperate Little Man", "Engine 143", "Little Moses", and "Single Girl, Married Girl" on Anthology of American Folk Music, and "Bury Me Under The Weeping Willow ", "Little Log Cabin By The Sea", "The Poor Orphan Child", "The Storms Are On The Ocean", "Single Girl, Married Girl" and "The Wandering Boy" during the Bristol sessions
- Ray Charles: "What'd I Say", Modern Sounds in Country and Western Music, and "I Got a Woman" on Green Onions (Booker T. & the M.G.'s)
- Clifton Chenier: Bogalusa Boogie, and performer in the Crescent City Living Legends Collection
- Chicago Symphony Orchestra: Pictures at an Exhibition (Mussorgsky; with Rafael Kubelik, conductor) and Also sprach Zarathustra (Richard Strauss; with Fritz Reiner, conductor)
- Winston Churchill: "Sinews of Peace" speech and 1941 Christmas Eve broadcast
- Nat King Cole: "Straighten Up and Fly Right", "The Christmas Song", and first Jazz at the Philharmonic concert (performer)
- John Coltrane: Giant Steps, A Love Supreme, and Kind of Blue (with Miles Davis)
- Sam Cooke: "A Change Is Gonna Come", "Jesus Gave Me Water" (with the Soul Stirrers), and "You Send Me" on Fly Like an Eagle (Steve Miller Band)
- Norman Corwin: We Hold These Truths and On a Note of Triumph (writer)
- Bing Crosby: "Brother, Can You Spare a Dime?" and "White Christmas"
- David Crosby: Déjà Vu (Crosby, Stills, Nash & Young; member) and "Turn! Turn! Turn!" (The Byrds; member)
- Celia Cruz: Celia & Johnny and performing "Diosa del Ritmo" on Live at Yankee Stadium (Fania All-Stars)
- Miles Davis: "Ko-Ko", Kind of Blue, Bitches Brew, and "Solar" and "Milestones" on The Complete Village Vanguard Recordings (Bill Evans Trio)
- Fats Domino: "Blueberry Hill", "Ain't That a Shame" on Cheap Trick at Budokan (Cheap Trick), and "I'm Walkin" on J.D. Crowe & The New South (J.D. Crowe and The New South)
- Thomas A. Dorsey: "If I Could Hear My Mother Pray Again", Precious Lord: New Recordings of the Great Gospel Songs of Thomas A. Dorsey, and "Peace in the Valley" (Red Foley and the Sunshine Boys)
- Dr. Dre: The Chronic (self) and Straight Outta Compton (N.W.A)
- Thomas Edison: 1878 "St. Louis tinfoil" recording, 1888–89 exhibition recordings on phonograph cylinders ("Around the World on the Phonograph", "The Pattison Waltz" and "Fifth Regiment March"), and honoree of Light's Golden Jubilee
- Bernard Edwards: "Le Freak" (Chic; member), "We Are Family" (Sister Sledge), "Rapper's Delight" (The Sugarhill Gang), and Like a Virgin (Madonna; bass guitar)
- Duke Ellington: Ellington at Newport, "Sono" and "Frustration" on The Jazz Scene, "Blue Reverie" on Carnegie Hall Jazz Concert (Benny Goodman), and the Blanton-Webster era recordings
- Brian Eno: "The Microsoft Sound", Remain in Light (Talking Heads; producer/composer) and The Joshua Tree (U2; producer)
- Bill Evans: The Complete Village Vanguard Recordings, 1961 (Bill Evans Trio), Kind of Blue (with Miles Davis), and Blues and the Abstract Truth (with Oliver Nelson)
- The Everly Brothers: "Cathy's Clown", Graceland (with Paul Simon), and "When Will I Be Loved" on Heart Like a Wheel (Linda Ronstadt, Phil Everly as writer)
- Joe Falcon: "Allons à Lafayette", and "Acadian One Step", "Le vieux soûlard et sa femme", and "C'est si triste sans lui" on Anthology of American Folk Music
- Frederick Fennell: Winds in Hi-Fi (with the Eastman Wind Ensemble) and "Suite No. 1 in E flat", "Suite No. 2 in F" (Holst) / Music for the Royal Fireworks (Handel) / "Fantasia in G" (Bach) (with the Cleveland Symphonic Winds)
- Stephen Foster: Many songs on the Vernacular Wax Cylinder Recordings at UCSB and "Jeanie with the Light Brown Hair" and "Camptown Races" on Our American Journey (Chanticleer)
- Judy Garland: "Over the Rainbow", Judy at Carnegie Hall, and "Over the Rainbow" on Carousel of American Music
- Marvin Gaye: What's Going On, "Dancing in the Street" (Martha & the Vandellas, single) and "Dancing in the Street" on Barton Hall Concert at Cornell University (Grateful Dead)
- George Gershwin (without Ira): "Fascinating Rhythm" (Fred & Adele Astaire, as pianist), "Rhapsody in Blue" (Paul Whiteman Orchestra), "Swanee" (Al Jolson), Porgy and Bess (original cast), "Summertime" on Cheap Thrills (Big Brother and the Holding Company), Live in Japan (Sarah Vaughan), and on Carousel of American Music (Edwin McArthur), and "Do It Again" and "Swanee" on Judy at Carnegie Hall (Judy Garland)
- George and Ira Gershwin: "Fascinating Rhythm" (Fred & Adele Astaire and Sol Hoʻopiʻi versions), "A Foggy Day" and "They Can't Take That Away from Me" on Songs for Young Lovers (Frank Sinatra), "Oh, Lady Be Good!" on Hottest Women's Band of the 1940s (International Sweethearts of Rhythm), "A Foggy Day" on Live in Japan (Sarah Vaughan), "Love Walked In" on Our American Journey (Chanticleer), "Who Cares (As Long as You Care for Me)", "A Foggy Day", and "How Long Has This Been Going On?" on Judy at Carnegie Hall (Judy Garland), "Porgy (I Loves You, Porgy)" and "My Man's Gone Now" on The Complete Village Vanguard Recordings (Bill Evans Trio), "The Man I Love" and "I Got Rhythm" on Carnegie Hall Jazz Concert (Benny Goodman) and on Carousel of American Music (Edwin McArthur)
- Dizzy Gillespie: "Ko-Ko", "Manteca" (Dizzy Gillespie Big Band), and "A Night in Tunisia" on "A Night at Birdland" (Art Blakey)
- Benny Goodman: "Rose Room" (with Charlie Christian) and Carnegie Hall Jazz Concert
- Merle Haggard: "Mama Tried", and "Mama Tried" on Barton Hall Concert at Cornell University (Grateful Dead)
- Herbie Hancock: Head Hunters (self) and Songs in the Key of Life (Rhodes piano on "As"; with Stevie Wonder)
- George Frideric Handel: Messiah (Eugene Ormandy and the Tabernacle Choir), Music for the Royal Fireworks (Frederick Fennell and the Cleveland Symphonic Winds), and "Concerto Grosso in B-flat major, Op. 3, no. 1" (Erich Leinsdorf and the Boston Symphony Orchestra)
- Don Henley: Their Greatest Hits (1971–1975) (Eagles; member) and Late for the Sky (vocals; with Jackson Browne)
- Jim Henson: Sesame Street: Platinum All-Time Favorites (as Ernie and Kermit the Frog) and "Rainbow Connection" (as Kermit)
- Mississippi John Hurt: Today! and "Frankie" and "Spike Driver Blues" on Anthology of American Folk Music
- Blind Lemon Jefferson: "That Black Snake Moan / Matchbox Blues" (single) and "Rabbit Foot Blues", "Prison Cell Blues", and "See That My Grave Is Kept Clean" on Anthology of American Folk Music
- Antônio Carlos Jobim: "The Girl from Ipanema" (with Stan Getz and João Gilberto) and "Wave" on Live in Japan (Sarah Vaughan)
- Blind Willie Johnson: "Dark Was the Night, Cold Was the Ground" (single, also featured on Murmurs of Earth), and "John the Revelator" on Anthology of American Folk Music
- James P. Johnson: "Harlem Strut", "Charleston" (Golden Gate Orchestra), and "Charleston", Old-Fashioned Love, and If I Could Be With You" on The Eighty-Six Years of Eubie Blake (Eubie Blake)
- Scott Joplin: Ragtime piano rolls, Treemonisha (Gunther Schuller with the Houston Grand Opera), and "Maple Leaf Rag" on The Eighty-Six Years of Eubie Blake (Eubie Blake)
- Carole King: Tapestry, "Will You Love Me Tomorrow" on Tonight's the Night (The Shirelles), and "So Much Love", "Don't Forget About Me", "No Easy Way Down", and "I Can't Make It Alone" on Dusty in Memphis (Dusty Springfield)
- John Lennon: "Imagine", Sgt. Pepper's Lonely Hearts Club Band (The Beatles; member), "Got to Get You into My Life" on I've Got the Music in Me (Thelma Houston), and "I'll Be Back" and "She's Leaving Home" on Lincoln Mayorga and Distinguished Colleagues
- Alan Lomax: Jelly Roll Morton interviews, United Sacred Harp Musical Convention in Fyffe, Alabama, "Bonaparte's Retreat" (William Hamilton Stepp), and "Clifton's Crew" (Pat Bonner)
- Professor Longhair: "Tipitina" and performer in the Crescent City Living Legends Collection
- Teo Macero: Mingus Ah Um (Charles Mingus; producer), Bitches Brew (Miles Davis; producer), and Time Out (Dave Brubeck; producer)
- Uncle Dave Macon: "Way Down the Old Plank Road" and "Buddy Won't You Roll Down the Line" on Anthology of American Folk Music and Grand Ole Opry debut
- Henry Mancini: The Music from Peter Gunn and "Moon River" (Andy Williams)
- Curtis Mayfield: Super Fly and "People Get Ready" (The Impressions)
- Lincoln Mayorga: Lincoln Mayorga and Distinguished Colleagues and I've Got the Music in Me (Thelma Houston, keyboards)
- Paul McCartney: Sgt. Pepper's Lonely Hearts Club Band (The Beatles; member), "The Girl Is Mine" on Thriller (with Michael Jackson), "Got to Get You into My Life" on I've Got the Music in Me (Thelma Houston), and "I'll Be Back" and "She's Leaving Home" on Lincoln Mayorga and Distinguished Colleagues
- Graham McNamee: The second inauguration of Calvin Coolidge, Charles Lindbergh's arrival in New York following his first transatlantic flight, and Light's Golden Jubilee
- Grandmaster Melle Mel: "The Message" (Grandmaster Flash and the Furious Five; member) and "I Feel for You" (with Chaka Khan)
- Joni Mitchell: For the Roses, "Woodstock" on Déjà Vu (Crosby, Stills, Nash & Young), and "Both Sides, Now" on Will the Circle Be Unbroken (Nitty Gritty Dirt Band)
- Bill Monroe: "Blue Moon of Kentucky" (with the Blue Grass Boys) and "Blue Moon of Kentucky" on The Sun Sessions (Elvis Presley)
- Giorgio Moroder: "I Feel Love" (Donna Summer) and "Flashdance... What a Feeling" (Irene Cara)
- Jelly Roll Morton: Alan Lomax interviews and "Black Bottom Stomp" (with his Red Hot Peppers)
- Wolfgang Amadeus Mozart: "Il mio tesoro" (John McCormack), the "Queen of the Night aria" on Murmurs of Earth (Edda Moser with Wolfgang Sawallisch and the Bavarian State Opera), and "Porgi amor" and "Dove sono" on Signatures (Renée Fleming)
- Edward R. Murrow: I Can Hear It Now: 1933–1945 and Sep. 21, 1940 broadcast from London
- NBC Symphony Orchestra: Adagio for Strings (Samuel Barber; with Arturo Toscanini, conductor) and "Piano Concerto No. 1, op. 23, B♭ minor" (Tchaikovsky; with Toscanini, conductor)
- Ric Ocasek: The Cars and Weezer (Weezer; producer)
- Babatunde Olatunji: Drums of Passion and "All Africa" and "Tears for Johannesburg" on We Insist! (Max Roach; drummer)
- Johnny Pacheco: Celia & Johnny (with Celia Cruz) and Live At Yankee Stadium (Fania All-Stars; member)
- Dolly Parton: Coat of Many Colors and I Will Always Love You (recorded by Whitney Houston)
- Cole Porter: "You're the Top" (self), "Begin the Beguine" (Artie Shaw), Kiss Me, Kate (original Broadway cast), Ella Fitzgerald Sings the Cole Porter Song Book (Ella Fitzgerald), "I Get a Kick Out of You" on Songs for Young Lovers (Frank Sinatra), "Love for Sale" on Go! (Dexter Gordon), and "All of You" on The Complete Village Vanguard Recordings (Bill Evans Trio)
- Leontyne Price: A Program of Song and Aida (Verdi)
- Prince: Purple Rain and "I Feel for You" (Chaka Khan)
- Ismael Quintana: Azúcar Pa' Ti (Eddie Palmieri), Live At Yankee Stadium (Fania All-Stars; member)
- Sergei Rachmaninoff: Piano Concerto No. 2 in C minor (Leopold Stokowski and the Philadelphia Symphony Orchestra) and Rachmaninoff's Vespers (All-Night Virgil) (Robert Shaw and The Robert Shaw Festival Singers)
- Bonnie Raitt: Nick of Time and "Give it up or Let Me Go" on Wide Open Spaces (The Chicks)
- Paul Robeson: Show Boat (original Broadway cast) and Othello (Broadway cast)
- Marty Robbins: Gunfighter Ballads and Trail Songs (self) and "El Paso" on Barton Hall Concert at Cornell University (Grateful Dead)
- Jimmie Rodgers: "Blue Yodel (T for Texas)", and "The Soldier's Sweetheart" and "Sleep Baby Sleep" during the Bristol sessions
- Rodgers and Hart: "My Funny Valentine" (Gerry Mulligan quartet and Chet Baker), "Ten Cents a Dance" (Ruth Etting), "I Could Write a Book" on The Audience with Betty Carter (Betty Carter), "Blue Room" on Carnegie Hall Jazz Concert (Benny Goodman), "My Romance" on The Complete Village Vanguard Recordings (Bill Evans Trio), "This Can't Be Love" and "You're Nearer" on Judy at Carnegie Hall (Judy Garland), "My Funny Valentine" and "I Could Write a Book" on Live in Japan (Sarah Vaughan), "My Funny Valentine" and "Little Girl Blue" on Songs for Young Lovers (Frank Sinatra), and "Blue Moon" on The Sun Sessions (Elvis Presley)
- Rodgers and Hammerstein: South Pacific, Oklahoma!, The Sound of Music, and "My Lord and Master" (from The King and I) on People (Barbra Streisand)
- Nile Rodgers: "Le Freak" (Chic; member), "We Are Family" (Sister Sledge), Like a Virgin (Madonna; producer), and "Good Times", sampled on Rapper's Delight (The Sugarhill Gang)
- Roy Rogers: "Happy Trails" (with Dale Evans), and "Tumbling Tumbleweeds" (Sons of the Pioneers; member)
- Sonny Rollins: Saxophone Colossus, Brilliant Corners (with Thelonious Monk), and "Airegin" on The Incredible Jazz Guitar of Wes Montgomery (Wes Montgomery)
- Linda Ronstadt: Heart Like a Wheel, Canciones de Mi Padre, Graceland (with Paul Simon; vocals), and "El Puente Roto" on Partners (with Flaco Jiménez)
- Franklin D. Roosevelt: 1941 Christmas Eve broadcast, complete presidential speeches, and "Fireside chats"
- Diana Ross: "Where Did Our Love Go" (The Supremes; member) and "When We Grow Up" on Free to Be... You and Me
- Carl Sagan: Sounds of the Earth (producer) and Pale Blue Dot (narrator)
- Pete Seeger: We Shall Overcome, several songs on Talking Union (The Almanac Singers), and "Turn! Turn! Turn!" (The Byrds)
- Robert Shaw: Mass in B minor (Bach; with the Robert Shaw Chorale) and Rachmaninoff's Vespers (All-Night Virgil) (Rachmaninoff; with the Robert Shaw Festival Singers)
- Paul Simon: Sounds of Silence (Simon & Garfunkel) and Graceland (solo)
- Stephen Sondheim: West Side Story, Gypsy and Sweeney Todd: The Demon Barber of Fleet Street
- Phil Spector: "Be My Baby" (The Ronettes) and "You've Lost That Lovin' Feelin" (The Righteous Brothers)
- Stephen Stills: Déjà Vu (Crosby, Stills, Nash & Young) and "Change Partners" on Partners
- Leopold Stokowski: 1942 recording of Native Brazilian music and Piano Concerto No. 2 in C minor (Rachmaninoff)
- Richard Strauss: Also Sprach Zarathustra (Fritz Reiner), Winds in Hi-Fi (Frederick Fennell and the Cleveland Symphonic Winds), Four Last Songs (Jessye Norman), Leonard Bernstein debut (sections of Don Quixote), A Program of Song (Leontyne Price) and Signatures (Fleming)
- Igor Stravinsky: The Rite of Spring and Murmurs of Earth (also containing a section of the same piece)
- Pyotr Ilyich Tchaikovsky: Piano Concerto No.1 (Van Cliburn) and Signatures (Renée Fleming)
- Big Mama Thorton: "Hound Dog" (self), "Hound Dog" on Hoodoo Man Blues (Junior Wells and his Chicago Blues Band with Buddy Guy), and "Ball and Chain" on Cheap Thrills (Big Brother and the Holding Company)
- Arturo Toscanini: Piano Concerto No. 1 and "Adagio for Strings" (Samuel Barber)
- Jimmy Webb: "Wichita Lineman" (Glen Campbell) and "Up, Up and Away" on Sheffield S9 (Lincoln Mayorga)
- Kurt Weill: "Mack the Knife" (both versions by Louis Armstrong and Bobby Darin) and Saxophone Colossus (Rollins)
- Orson Welles: War of the Worlds and The Fall of the City
- Paul Whiteman: Rhapsody in Blue and "Whispering"
- Hank Williams: "Lovesick Blues" (self), "I Can't Help It (If I'm Still in Love with You)" on Heart Like a Wheel (Linda Ronstadt), "Hey, Good Lookin'" and "You Win Again" on Modern Sounds in Country and Western Music (Ray Charles), and "I Saw the Light", "Honky Tonk Blues", and "Honky Tonkin'" on Will the Circle Be Unbroken (Nitty Gritty Dirt Band)
- Brian Wilson: Pet Sounds (The Beach Boys) and "Good Vibrations" on Sheffield S9 (Lincoln Mayorga)
- The Wrecking Crew: Pet Sounds (The Beach Boys), Forever Changes (Love), "You've Lost That Lovin' Feelin'" (The Righteous Brothers), "Be My Baby" (The Ronettes) "Wichita Lineman" (Glen Campbell). Additionally, Carol Kaye on La Bamba (Ritchie Valens)
- Stevie Wonder: "Lift Every Voice and Sing" (Melba Moore & Friends), "I Feel for You" (Chaka Khan), I've Got the Music in Me (Thelma Houston) and Songs in the Key of Life (solo)
- Frank Zappa: We're Only in It for the Money (Mothers of Invention) and Trout Mask Replica (producer)

The following list contains the songs included on more than one entry.

List of songs

Popular Songs

- "All of You": on Ella Fitzgerald Sings the Cole Porter Song Book (Ella Fitzgerald) and on The Complete Village Vanguard Recordings (Bill Evans Trio)
- "Always True to You in My Fashion": on Ella Fitzgerald Sings the Cole Porter Song Book (Ella Fitzgerald) and Kiss Me, Kate (original Broadway cast)
- "Begin the Beguine": Artie Shaw (single) and on Ella Fitzgerald Sings the Cole Porter Song Book (Ella Fitzgerald)
- "Blue Moon of Kentucky": Bill Monroe and the Blue Grass Boys (single) and on The Sun Sessions (Elvis Presley)
- "Charleston": Golden Gate Orchestra and on The Eighty-Six Years of Eubie Blake (Eubie Blake)
- "The Christmas Song": Nat King Cole and on A Charlie Brown Christmas (Vince Guaraldi)
- "Dancing in the Street": Martha & the Vandellas (single) and on Barton Hall Concert at Cornell University (Grateful Dead)
- "El Paso": on Gunfighter Ballads and Trail Songs (Marty Robbins) and on Barton Hall Concert at Cornell University (Grateful Dead)
- "Dark Was the Night, Cold Was the Ground": Blind Willie Johnson (single) and on Murmurs of Earth (also Johnson)
- "A Foggy Day": on Songs for Young Lovers (Frank Sinatra), Live in Japan (Sarah Vaughan), and on Judy at Carnegie Hall (Judy Garland)
- "God Bless America": Kate Smith (single) and on Carousel of American Music (Irving Berlin)
- "Hound Dog": Big Mama Thornton (single) and on Hoodoo Man Blues (Junior Wells and his Chicago Blues Band with Buddy Guy)
- "I Could Write a Book": on The Audience with Betty Carter (Betty Carter) and on Live in Japan (Sarah Vaughan),
- "I Get a Kick Out of You": on Ella Fitzgerald Sings the Cole Porter Song Book (Ella Fitzgerald) and on Songs for Young Lovers (Frank Sinatra)
- "I Got Rhythm": on Carnegie Hall Jazz Concert (Benny Goodman) and on Carousel of American Music (Edwin McArthur)
- "Porgy (I Loves You, Porgy)": on Porgy and Bess (original cast) and The Complete Village Vanguard Recordings (Bill Evans Trio)
- "John the Revelator": Golden Gate Quartet and Blind Willie Johnson on Anthology of American Folk Music
- "Love for Sale": on Ella Fitzgerald Sings the Cole Porter Song Book (Ella Fitzgerald) and on Go! (Dexter Gordon)
- "Mack the Knife": Louis Armstrong, Bobby Darin (singles) and on Saxophone Colossus (Sonny Rollins)
- "Maple Leaf Rag": Scott Joplin's piano rolls and on The Eighty-Six Years of Eubie Blake (Eubie Blake)
- "Mama Tried": Merle Haggard (single) and on Barton Hall Concert at Cornell University (Grateful Dead)
- "My Funny Valentine": Gerry Mulligan quartet and Chet Baker (single), on Live in Japan (Sarah Vaughan), and on Songs for Young Lovers (Frank Sinatra)
- "My Man's Gone Now": on Porgy and Bess (original cast) and on The Complete Village Vanguard Recordings (Bill Evans Trio)
- "Over the Rainbow": Judy Garland, Israel Kamakawiwoʻole (singles), on Judy at Carnegie Hall, on Carousel of American Music (both Garland), and on Live in Japan (Sarah Vaughan)
- "Puttin' On the Ritz": Harry Richman (single) and on Judy at Carnegie Hall (Judy Garland)
- "Single Girl, Married Girl": Anthology of American Folk Music and the Bristol Sessions (both the Carter Family)
- "Sallie Gooden": Eck Robertson (single) and on J.D. Crowe & The New South (J.D. Crowe and The New South)
- "So in Love": on Ella Fitzgerald Sings the Cole Porter Song Book (Ella Fitzgerald) and Kiss Me, Kate (original Broadway cast)
- "Stardust": Hoagy Carmichael (single) and on Carousel of American Music (also Carmichael)
- "Stormy Weather": Ethel Waters (single) and on Judy at Carnegie Hall (Judy Garland)
- "Summertime": on Porgy and Bess (original cast), on Cheap Thrills (Big Brother and the Holding Company), on Live in Japan (Sarah Vaughan), and on Carousel of American Music (Edwin McArthur)
- "Swanee": Al Jolson (single) and on Judy at Carnegie Hall (Judy Garland)
- "Tom Dooley": Frank Proffitt and The Kingston Trio (singles)
- "Wabash Cannonball": Roy Acuff (single) and on Will the Circle Be Unbroken (Nitty Gritty Dirt Band)
- "Why Can't You Behave?": on Ella Fitzgerald Sings the Cole Porter Song Book (Ella Fitzgerald) and Kiss Me, Kate (original Broadway cast)
- "Wildwood Flower": The Carter Family (single) and on Will the Circle Be Unbroken (Nitty Gritty Dirt Band)
- "You're the Top": Cole Porter (single) and on Ella Fitzgerald Sings the Cole Porter Song Book (Ella Fitzgerald)
- "Your Love": Jamie Principle and Frankie Knuckles (singles, different versions)

Classical Compositions

- The Well-Tempered Clavier: "Prelude and Fugue in C major" on Murmurs of Earth (Glenn Gould) and "Prelude and Fugue in E-flat major" and "Prelude and Fugue in C minor" on Switched-On Bach (Wendy Carlos)
- Brandenburg Concertos: "Brandenburg Concerto No.2" on Murmurs of Earth (Karl Richter and the Munich Bach Orchestra) and "Brandenburg Concerto No.3" on Switched-On Bach (Wendy Carlos)
- The Rite of Spring: The 1940 New York Philharmonic recording (with Stravinsky) and on Murmurs of Earth (Columbia Symphony Orchestra and Stravinsky)

== See also ==
- Grammy Hall of Fame
- National Film Registry
- Sounds of Australia
- Rock and Roll Hall of Fame
