= Quimbara =

Single by Celia Cruz and Johnny Pacheco

from the album Celia & Johnny
- Released: 1974
- Recorded: 1974
- Genre: Salsa
- Length: 4:51
- Label: Fania
- Songwriter: Junior Cepeda

Celia Cruz singles chronology
| "Quimbo Quimbumbia" (1969) | "Quimbara" (1974) | "Toro Mata" (1974) |

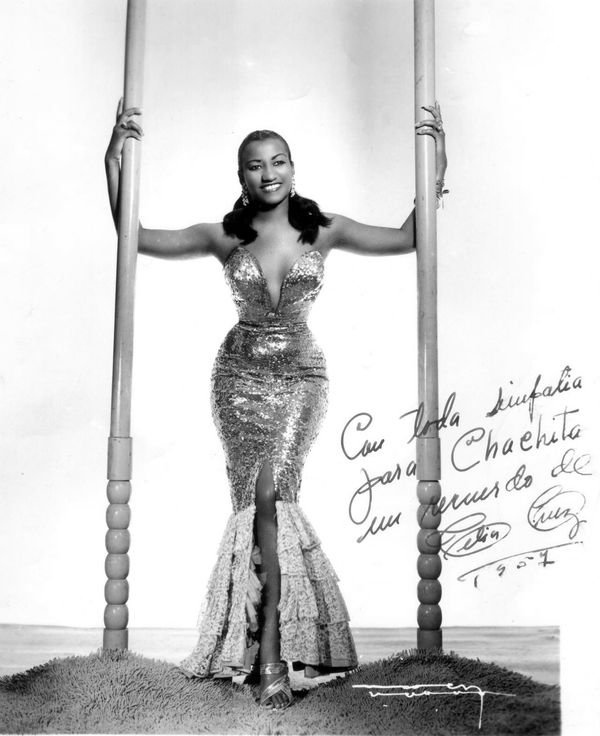
Celia Cruz in Havana, 1957

"Quimbara" is a song performed by Cuban recording artist Celia Cruz and Dominican recording artist Johnny Pacheco. The song, written by 20 year old Junior Cepeda from Puerto Rico, was released as the lead single from Cruz and Pacheco's joint studio album Celia & Johnny (1974).

According to Billboard, it reached number one in Miami and New York, number two in Chicago and number 12 in Los Angeles.

== Cover versions ==
In 1997, American salsa group Dark Latin Groove covered the song in a duet with Puerto Rican recording artist Ivy Queen, on their second studio album Swing On. This version of the song peaked at number twenty-five on the Billboard Digital Tropical Songs chart in 2010.

American entertainer Jennifer Lopez performed the song live as part the tribute to Cruz during the American Music Awards of 2013. Lopez also added the song to the setlist of her Las Vegas residency, All I Have.

In 2004, Gloria Estefan, Patti LaBelle, and Arturo Sandoval covered the song on ¡Azúcar!, a DVD musical tribute to Celia Cruz.

In 2015, Ivy Queen covered the song, in a medley, along with "Bemba Colora", on her ninth studio album, Vendetta.

In 2019, Angélique Kidjo covered the song on her album Celia.

In 2020, Lizbeth Román covered the song on the album Nuestra Isla, Nuestro Encanto.

In 2024, Scottish Electronic Music Producer Barry Can't Swim sampled the song on his dancefloor hit "Kimbara."

== Charts ==
=== Celia Cruz version ===
| Chart (2013) | Peak |
|---|---|
| US Tropical Digital Songs (Billboard) | 15 |

=== Dark Latin Groove and Ivy Queen version ===
| Chart (2010) | Peak |
|---|---|
| US Tropical Digital Songs (Billboard) | 25 |
