= Celia & Johnny =

Studio album by Celia Cruz and Johnny Pacheco
- Released: october 11, 1974
- Recorded: 1974
- Genre: Salsa
- Language: Spanish
- Label: Vaya
- Producer: Jerry Masucci

Professional ratings
Review scores
Source	Rating
AllMusic	4.5/5 stars
The Encyclopedia of Popular Music	3/5 stars

Celia & Johnny is the first collaborative album between the duo of Celia Cruz and Johnny Pacheco. It was released in 1974 by Vaya Records. In 2014, the U.S. Library of Congress named it to the National Recording Registry as "culturally, historically, or aesthetically significant". In 2015, it was selected by Billboard magazine as one of the "50 Essential Latin Albums of the Last 50 Years". The album was named one of the 50 greatest salsa albums of all time by Rolling Stone magazine in October 2024.

== Track listing ==
Side A
No.	Title	Writer(s)	Arranger(s)	Length
1.	"Quimbara"	Junior Cepeda	Felipe Yanes	4:56
2.	"Toro Mata"		Bobby Valentin	5:39
3.	"Vieja Luna"	Orlando de la Rosa	Felipe Yanes	3:13
4.	"El Paso Del Mulo"	Rey Diaz Calvet	Johnny Pacheco	4:41
5.	"Tengo El Idde"	C. Curet Alonso	Papo Lucca	5:00

Side B
No.	Title	Writer(s)	Arranger(s)	Length
1.	"Lo Tuyo Es Mental"	Anam Muar		3:13
2.	"Canto A La Habana"	Alberto Castillo	Papo Lucca	5:31
3.	"Ño Mercedes"	C. Curet Alonso		4:17
4.	"El Tumbao Y Celia"	Johnny Pacheco	Johnny Pacheco	4:52
5.	"El Pregón Del Pescador"		Bobby Valentin	5:04
