= Azúcar pa' ti (Sugar for You) =

Studio album by Eddie Palmieri
- Released: 1965
- Label: Tico

Azúcar pa' ti (Sugar for You) is a 1965 album recorded by Eddie Palmieri and released by Tico Records. The album was Palmieri's most successful album, and included one of his biggest songs, "Azucar", an eight-minute descarga-esque song. The album also included the original recording of "Oyelo que te conviene", which was later recorded on his 1975 album Unfinished Masterpiece along with lead vocalist Lalo Rodríguez.

In 2009, the album was added to the United States National Recording Registry by the Library of Congress for being "culturally, aesthetically, or historically significant". The album was named one of the 50 greatest salsa albums of all time by Rolling Stone Magazine in October 2024.

== Track listing ==
All tracks are written by Eddie Palmieri, except tracks 1 (Palmieri, Ismael Quintana) and 2 (Isabel Valdes).

| No. | Title | Length |
|---|---|---|
| 1. | "Solo pensar en yi" | 3:40 |
| 2. | "Mi sonsito" | 5:20 |
| 3. | "Azúcar" | 8:30 |
| 4. | "Cuidate compay" | 5:36 |
| 5. | "Los cueros me llaman" | 5:15 |
| 6. | "Tema del apolo" | 2:15 |
| 7. | "Oyelo que te conviene" | 3:30 |
| Total length: | | 34:06 |
