= Carl Schroeder (pianist) =

American jazz pianist

Carlton Schroeder
- Born: Carlton Schroeder
- Origin: United States
- Genres: Jazz
- Occupations: Pianist, educator, author
- Instrument: Piano
- Years active: 1970s–2015

Carlton Schroeder is an American jazz pianist who was an accompanist to Sarah Vaughan in the 1970s. Schroeder taught at the Musician's Institute in Los Angeles, California from the 1980s until his retirement in 2015. Carlton Schroeder has also played with Art Blakey, Howard Roberts, Roy Haynes, Jimmy Cobb, Joe Henderson, Frank Sinatra and Mel Torme.

== Harmony & Theory Instruction Book ==
In 1988, Carl Schroeder co-authored with Keith Wyatt, another long-term instructor at Musicians Institute, an instruction book called "Harmony & Theory - A Comprehensive Source For All Musicians."

== Partial discography ==
- itself Carlton Schroeder Trio (2010)
- Bonita (with Joe Diorio, 1980)
- Tenor Sax Jazz Impressions (with Bob Cooper, 1979)

With Roy Haynes

- Senyah (1971)
- Hip Ensemble (1973)

With Sarah Vaughan

- Live in Belgrade (2009)
- Ronnie Scott's Presents Sarah Vaughan Live (1977)
- Live in Prague (2007)
- Live in Japan (1973)
- Live at Laren Jazz Festival 1975, The Lost Recordings (1975)
- Live at Rosy's (1978)
