= If I Could Hear My Mother Pray Again =

Gospel song

"If I Could Hear My Mother Pray Again" (1922) is a popular gospel song written by John Whitfield "Whit" Vaughan (1879–1945), as a tribute to his own mother, Clara Beady Burgess-Vaughan. The words are based on a text by James Rowe, an English settler living in Georgia during the early twentieth century. A 1934 recording of the song by Thomas A. Dorsey was selected in 2007 by the United States' National Recording Preservation Board for preservation in the National Recording Registry.

The song has been recorded by numerous artists, including Wade Mainer, Florida Boys, Daniel O'Donnell, Charlie Louvin duet with Tammy Wynette in 1991 on the album: "And That's The Gospel", Loretta Lynn, Dave Moody, Mahalia Jackson Dorothy Love Coates and Ben Harper.
