= Live in Japan (Sarah Vaughan album) =

Live album by Sarah Vaughan
- Released: 1973
- Recorded: September 24, 1973
- Venue: Nakano Sun Plaza Hall, Nakano, Tokyo, Japan
- Genre: Vocal jazz
- Length: 113:47
- Label: Mainstream
- Producer: Bob Shad

Sarah Vaughan chronology
Feelin' Good (1972)	Live in Japan (1973)	Send in the Clowns (1974)

Professional ratings
Review scores
Source	Rating
AllMusic	3/5 stars
AllMusic	3/5 stars
AllMusic	5/5 stars
DownBeat	4/5 stars
The Virgin Encyclopedia of Popular Music	3/5 stars

Live in Japan is a 1973 live album by the American jazz singer Sarah Vaughan, recorded at the Nakano Sun Plaza Hall in Tokyo, Japan.

== Release ==
The original double vinyl release contained 18 tracks. The expanded "complete" edition was issued on CD in 1987, with 27 tracks.

== Reception and legacy ==
The album was praised in the original LP sleeve-notes by jazz critic Nat Hentoff: "There is Sarah's striking sense of design. The basic framework of each song is carefully structured and personalised, and that makes her frequently stunning improvisations ... all the more absorbing. ... Hers is so resonant and rich a sound you feel you can almost touch it ... in sum a nonpareil illustration of a master singer at the peak of her expressive energies."

The Billboard magazine review from December 15, 1973, commented that "Sarah's virtuosity is something constant...she is superb is gliding, floating, soaring, caressing each word, each note, breaking down words into syllables and extracting the true meaning from each phrase." The review described Vaughan's performance of "Wave" as "a soft, delicate experience in which the scales the vocal spectrum."

DownBeat reviewer Joe H. Klee assigned the album 4 stars. He wrote, "It's good to have Sarah Vaughan back as a jazz singer. The pop world has had her for far too long without sharing her with us". Klee praised track 5, stating, "If the album has a high point it is Sarah's scat singing of 'Willow Weep For Me' ", Klee also singled out the contributions of pianist Carl Schroeder.

Colin Larkin assigned the album 3 stars in The Virgin Encyclopedia of Popular Music. (Three stars means "Good. By the artist's usual standards and therefore recommended".)

Author Will Friedwald wrote the release "might be her single greatest album" in his book A Biographical Guide to the Great Jazz and Pop Singers, and called it "a career pinnacle". He singles out "The Nearness of You" as "the most amazing track". He wrote, "it may be the slowest and most intimate thing she ever sang - and it's unsullied by other musicians, just her own piano without any bass or drums. Vaughan stretches everything as far as it will go, but refuses to allow it to break. At the climax, she holds the final note for what seems like forever, with a big arpeggio underneath".

Friedwald also includes the album in his book The Great Jazz and Pop Vocal Albums as entry 47 out of 51. He wrote, "Live in Japan is an amazing snapshot of a great artist in a unique period". Of "Wave" he wrote, "the piece is a feature for Vaughan's astonishing vocal range . . . "Wave" has her going as far down as she can possibly go, and you can tell she relishes the workout."

In his 2003 book Jazz on Record: The First Sixty Years, critic Scott Yanow described Live in Japan as featuring Vaughan at the "height of her powers" and wrote that "Sassy's voice is often heard in miraculous form on this set."

In 2006, the United States Library of Congress honored the album by adding it to the National Recording Registry.

== Track listing ==
Disc one

1. "A Foggy Day" (George Gershwin, Ira Gershwin) - 1:21
2. "Poor Butterfly" (Raymond Hubbell, John Golden) - 5:04
3. "The Lamp Is Low" (Peter DeRose, Bert Shefter, Mitchell Parish) - 1:37
4. "'Round Midnight" (Thelonious Monk) - 5:37
5. "Willow Weep for Me" (Ann Ronnell) - 3:00
6. "There Will Never Be Another You" (Harry Warren, Mack Gordon) - 1:34
7. "Misty" (Erroll Garner, Johnny Burke)- 3:12
8. "Wave" (Antonio Carlos Jobim) - 7:03
9. "Like Someone in Love" (Jimmy van Heusen, Burke) - 2:29
10. "My Funny Valentine" (Richard Rodgers, Lorenz Hart) - 5:32
11. "All of Me" (Gerald Marks, Seymour Simons) - 1:56
12. "Where Do I Begin" (Francis Lai) - 5:05
13. "Over the Rainbow" (Harold Arlen, Yip Harburg) - 7:01
14. "I Could Write a Book" (Richard Rodgers, Lorenz Hart) - 2:15

Disc two

1. "The Nearness of You" (Hoagy Carmichael, Ned Washington) - 6:58
2. "I'll Remember April" (Gene de Paul, Don Raye) - 3:33
3. "Watch What Happens" (Norman Gimbel, Michel Legrand, Jacques Demy) - 3:04
4. "I Cried for You" (Arthur Freed, Abe Lyman, Gus Arnheim) - 1:33 †
5. "Summertime" (George Gershwin, DuBose Heyward) - 4:01 †
6. "The Blues" - 7:32 †
7. "I Remember You" (Victor Schertzinger, Johnny Mercer) - 5:09 †
8. "There Is No Greater Love" (Isham Jones, Marty Syms) - 4:03 †
9. "Rainy Days and Mondays" (Paul Williams, Roger Nichols) - 6:11 †
10. "On a Clear Day" (Burton Lane, Alan Jay Lerner) - 1:54 †
11. "Bye Bye Blackbird" (Ray Henderson, Mort Dixon) - 7:39
12. "Tonight" (Leonard Bernstein, Stephen Sondheim) - 1:12 †
13. "Tenderly" (Walter Gross, Jack Lawrence) - 3:27 †

† = Absent from the original 1973 releases, included in the "Complete" reissues.

== Personnel ==
- Sarah Vaughan – vocals, piano on "The Nearness of You"
- Carl Schroeder – piano
- John Giannelli – double bass
- Jimmy Cobb – drums
