= Ronnie Scott's Presents Sarah Vaughan Live =

Live album by Sarah Vaughan
- Released: 1977
- Recorded: June 10/11, 1977, Ronnie Scott's Club, London
- Genre: Vocal jazz
- Label: Pye Records; Jazz House Records (CD reissue)

Sarah Vaughan chronology
Sarah Vaughan and the Jimmy Rowles Quintet (1975)	Ronnie Scott's Presents Sarah Vaughan Live (1977)	I Love Brazil! (1977)

Ronnie Scott's Presents Sarah Vaughan Live, also known as Sassy at Ronnie's, is a 1977 live album by American jazz singer Sarah Vaughan.

== Track listing ==
1. Introduction by Ronnie Scott
2. "Here's That Rainy Day"
3. "Like Someone in Love"
4. "Feelings"
5. "I'll Remember April"
6. "Sophisticated Lady"
7. "If You Could See Me Now"
8. "Start Believing Me Now"
9. "My Funny Valentine"
10. "A Foggy Day"
11. "Send In The Clowns"
12. "Tenderly"

== Personnel ==
- Sarah Vaughan – vocals
- Carl Schroeder – piano
- Jimmy Cobb – drums
- Walter Booker – bass
