= The Jazz Scene =

1949 jazz album compiled by Norman Granz

Compilation album by Various
- Released: 1949
- Genre: Jazz
- Label: Mercury
- Producer: Norman Granz

The Jazz Scene is a 1949 compilation album edited by Norman Granz, featuring recordings from Ralph Burns, Duke Ellington, George Handy, Coleman Hawkins, Neal Hefti, Machito, Charlie Parker, Flip Phillips, Bud Powell, Willie Smith, Billy Strayhorn, and Lester Young.

The album was recorded in Los Angeles and New York City from 1946 to 1949, and released the week before Christmas 1949 by Mercury Records as a limited edition, deluxe box set of six 78 rpm records.

In 1953 the album was reissued in two-record 10-inch LP format, and in a six-disk 45 rpm EP boxed set. In 1955, it was reissued in 12-inch LP format. These reissues were released on Granz's Clef Records label.

In 1994, The Jazz Scene was remastered and expanded to include numerous previously unreleased pieces as a double CD, produced by Richard Seidel and released by Verve Records.

== Background and content ==
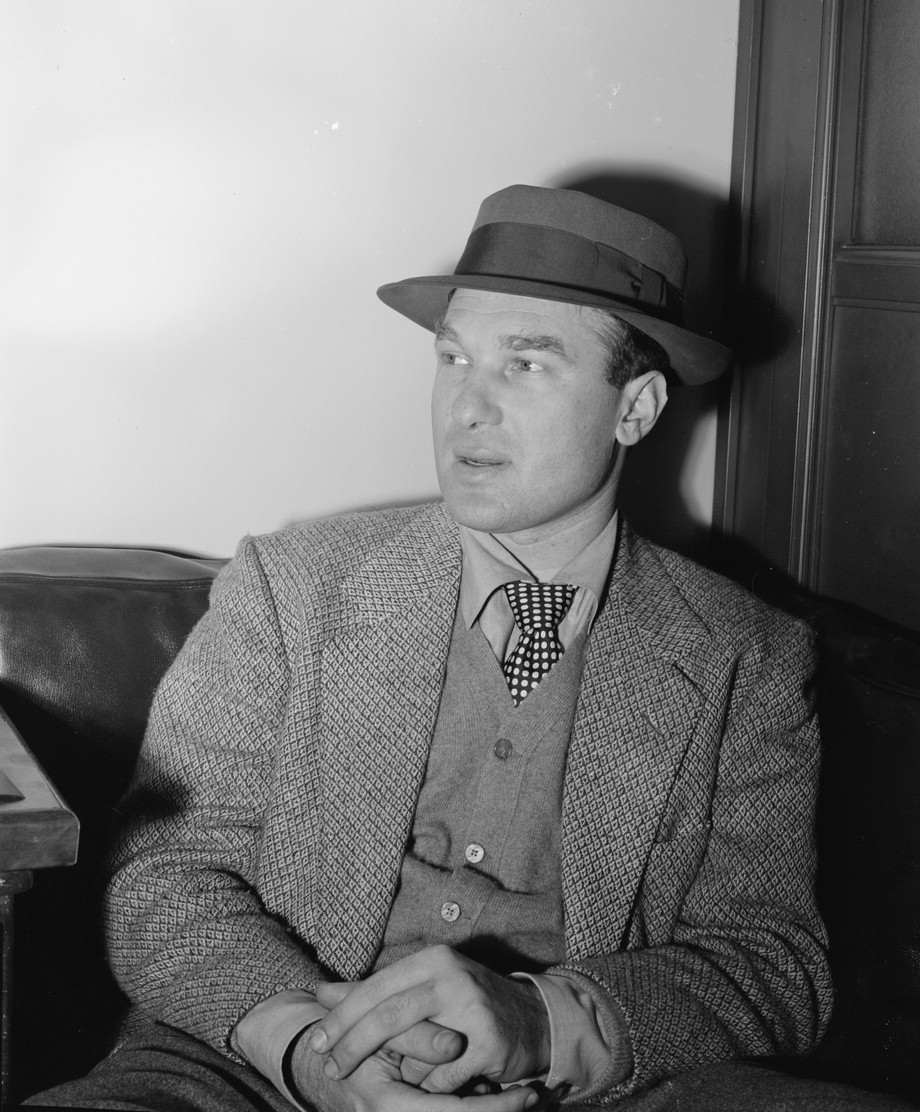
Norman Granz in 1947

After organizing his first Jazz at the Philharmonic concert in early July 1944, young impresario Norman Granz began recording well-known musicians of the era. From this material he produced The Jazz Scene in 1949, considered one of the first albums (box sets) in jazz.

Release of the album was anticipated in the music industry. In February 1949, Mercury was reported to be putting finishing touches on the album, and in May, Granz was said to be in Chicago "talking up a deal with Mercury about his jazz album." When released, The Jazz Scene was claimed to be "the most ambitious album undertaking in recent years," and "lives up to every bit of the one year's collection of advance huzzahs which preceded it to market." Half of the limited edition of 5,000 was pre-sold on the basis of preparatory promotion.

The six disks comprising the album presented the then-current scene of modern jazz, including well known names such as Coleman Hawkins, Charlie Parker, Lester Young, Duke Ellington, and Bud Powell. The album contained mainstream jazz by the trio of Lester Young (with pianist Nat Cole, credited as Auy Guy for contractual reasons) and the Willie Smith Quintet, as well as two tracks by a small combo featuring Duke Ellington, accompanied by strings, Neal Hefti's large orchestra with the added Charlie Parker solo part ("Repetition"), Coleman Hawkins' famous tenor solo ("Picasso", 1948), Machito's Latin ensemble, a 1949 Charlie Parker quartet session, the Bud Powell Trio, and big band recordings conducted by Ralph Burns and George Handy.

The box set included a set of photographs of the musicians from Gjon Mili, liner notes for each part of the edition, and a cover illustration by David Stone Martin. In the introduction, in which he clarified that he had given the musicians complete artistic freedom, Granz wrote:

This is our attempt to present today's jazz scene in terms of the visual, the written word, and the auditory.

The set was sold in a limited edition of 5,000 copies, individually numbered and personally signed by Granz, at the retail price of $25 (about $333.50 in 2025 dollars).

== Reception ==
Down Beat Magazine praised the album as "probably the most remarkable record album ever issued....the slightly delayed love child of JATP [Jazz at the Philharmonic] promoter Norman Granz.

The release of the 1953 LP garnered a glowing review in Cash Box magazine:

Norman Granz permits the artist to pick his own material, arrangement and instrumentation. No restrictions whatsoever are placed upon him. The artist was free to record and re-record until the sound he was trying to get, his technical perfection unhampered by commercial restrictions, and his ideas were to his satisfaction. The result is a picture of contemporary jazz that the jazz fan cannot do without.

In Allmusic, Scott Yanow recognized the 1994 edition "as one of the most significant releases of the year" and highlighted "the superb box set with photographs by Gjon Mili and the detailed liner notes"; "the edition is essential for all serious jazz collections". With the original edition from 1949, producer Norman Granz released "a remarkable album that perfectly represented the modern jazz scene of the time". In particular, he highlighted Coleman Hawkins' pioneering work of the unaccompanied tenor saxophone solo ("Picasso").

== Legacy ==
In 2007, the original 1949 album was added to the National Recording Registry by the Library of Congress.

== Track listing ==
No.	Title	Artist	Length
1.	"Sono"	Duke Ellington
2.	"Frustration"	Duke Ellington
3.	"Repetition"	Neal Hefti
4.	"Rhumbacito"	Neal Hefti
5.	"I Want to Be Happy"	Lester Young
6.	"Picasso"	Coleman Hawkins
7.	"Introspection"	Ralph Burns
8.	"The Bloos"	George Handy
9.	"The Bird"	Charlie Parker
10.	"Sophisticated Lady"	Willie Smith
11.	"Tangá"	Machito
12.	"Cherokee"	Bud Powell
