= We Hold These Truths =

American radio program

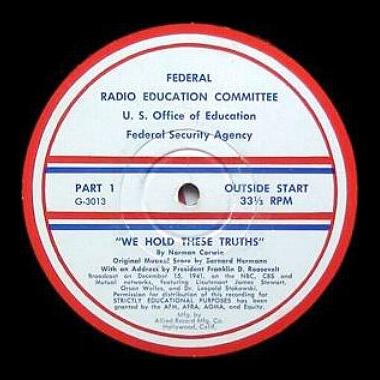
Transcription disc of We Hold These Truths (December 15, 1941)

We Hold These Truths, a celebration of the 150th anniversary of the United States Bill of Rights, was an hour-long radio program that explored American values and aired live on December 15, 1941, the first to be broadcast on all four major networks (CBS, NBC Red, NBC Blue, and Mutual). It was written and produced by Norman Corwin, who won a Peabody Award for the show, which commemorated the ratification of Bill of Rights on December 15, 1791. The attack on Pearl Harbor on December 7, 1941 — a week before the scheduled broadcast — may have contributed to what the Crossley Rating Service estimated to be 63 million listeners (almost half of the U.S. population), the largest audience in history for a dramatic performance.

The radio program had been commissioned by the United States government under the auspices of the Office of Education, and was scheduled for live broadcast on that date well before the attack on Pearl Harbor occurred. When producer Corwin asked on December 7 whether the show was still on, the response wired to him the next day was, "The President thinks it's more important now than ever to proceed with the program."

== Cast ==
The dramatic show was broadcast from New York City, Washington, D.C., and Hollywood, California. The music was composed by Bernard Herrmann. Performers included Edward Arnold, Lionel Barrymore, Bob Burns, Walter Brennan, Walter Huston, Marjorie Main, Edward G. Robinson, Jimmy Stewart, Rudy Vallee, and Orson Welles, with concluding remarks by President Franklin D. Roosevelt. The national anthem was conducted by Leopold Stokowski.

== Accolades ==
Besides Corwin's Peabody Award, We Hold These Truths was named to the National Recording Registry in 2005 (for 2004), the third year of the annual selection.

== Adaptations ==
In 1991, a new hour-long Otherworld Media Audio Theatre Production of We Hold These Truths was written and directed by David Ossman and Judith Walcutt. The performers included Tom Bosley, Lloyd Bridges, Richard Dysart, John Ireland, Fess Parker, Esther Rolle, Studs Terkel, and Jesse White. The score was written by Libby Larsen. This show won the American Bar Association's Silver Gavel Award, three gold medals at the N. Y. International Radio Festival and a Corporation for Public Broadcasting Silver Medal.
