= Messiah (Mormon Tabernacle Choir album) =

Live album by Mormon Tabernacle Choir, Eugene Ormandy, Philadelphia Orchestra
- Released: 1959
- Recorded: 1958
- Genre: Classical
- Length: 106:12
- Label: Columbia Masterworks

Messiah or Handel: Messiah features the Mormon Tabernacle Choir with the Philadelphia Orchestra, Eugene Ormandy (conductor), Richard Condie (choir director) and soloists Eileen Farrell, Martha Lipton, Davis Cunningham and William Warfield. The classic recording of George Frideric Handel's masterpiece was recorded during the Choir's 1958 concert tour and has been remastered for CD. This recording was selected by The National Recording Registry for the recorded sound section of the Library of Congress in 2004 as being "culturally, historically or aesthetically important."

The choir and orchestra had a long history, going back to 1936. This recording was made in 1958 and has set a standard for classical music recordings. It has been available for more than 50 years.

== Critical reception ==
At the time of its release, music critics commented on the choir's "great romantic choral tone, deep with feeling that is able to communicate the inner meaning of the world's great choral music."

Paul Hume, music critic for the Washington Post, wrote that "this sound of the Mormon Tabernacle Choir has been a special beacon for those who love the world's great choral music."

In 1963 the album was RIAA certified as a Gold album.

== Track listing ==
No.	Title	Length
1.	"No. 1: Overture"	4:27
2.	"No. 2: Comfort Ye, My People"	3:29
3.	"No. 3: Every Valley Shall Be Exalted"	3:53
4.	"No. 4: And the Glory of the Lord"	3:19
5.	"No. 5: Thus Saith the Lord"	1:31
6.	"No. 6: But Who May Abide"	4:33
7.	"No. 7: And He Shall Purify"	2:41
8.	"No. 8: Behold a Virgin Shall Conceive"	0:36
9.	"No. 9: O Thou That Tellest Good Tidings to Zion"	7:02
10.	"No. 12: For Unto Us a Child Is Born"	4:14
11.	"No. 13: Pastoral Symphony"	3:59
12.	"No. 14: There Were Shepherds"	0:52
13.	"No. 15: And the Angel Said Unto Them"	1:11
14.	"No. 16: And Suddenly There Was With the Angel"	0:28
15.	"No. 17: Glory to God"	1:53
16.	"No. 19: Then Shall the Eyes of the Blind Be Opened"	0:35
17.	"No. 20: He Shall Feed His Flock"	7:04
18.	"No. 21: His Yoke Is Easy"	2:47
19.	"No. 22: Behold the Lamb of God"	3:50
20.	"No. 23: He Was Despised"	5:17
21.	"No. 24: Surely He Hath Borne Our Griefs"	3:04
22.	"No. 25: And With His Stripes We Are Healed"	2:19
23.	"No. 26: All We Like Sheep Have Gone Astray"	4:17
24.	"No. 33: Lift Up Your Heads"	3:05
25.	"No. 40: Why Do the Nations?"	2:41
26.	"No. 42: He That Dwelleth in Heaven"	0:23
27.	"No. 43: Thou Shalt Break Them"	2:16
28.	"No. 44: Hallelujah!"	3:56
29.	"No. 45: I Know That My Redeemer Liveth"	7:07
30.	"No. 47: Behold, I Tell You a Mystery"	0:47
31.	"No. 48: The Trumpet Shall Sound"	6:53
32.	"No. 53: Worthy Is the Lamb"	6:32
