= Light's Golden Jubilee =

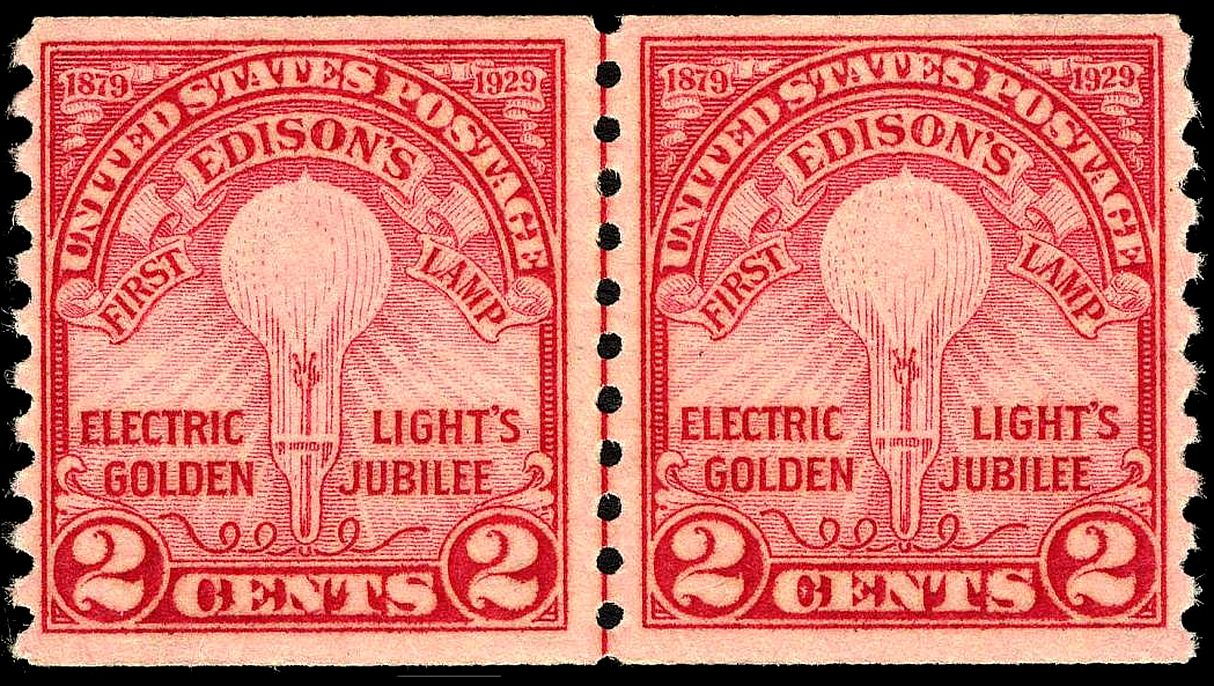
Commemorative U.S. stamp for Edison's incandescent light bulb.

Light's Golden Jubilee was a celebration of the 50th anniversary of Thomas Edison's incandescent light bulb, held on October 21, 1929, just days before the stock market crash of 1929 that swept the United States headlong into the Great Depression. The Jubilee also served as the dedication of Henry Ford's Greenfield Village, originally known as the Thomas Edison Institute.

== Origins ==
A golden jubilee marks the 50th anniversary of events, people, and things.

Originally, "Light’s Golden Jubilee" was a celebration organized by the General Electric Company, which had absorbed Edison's original business and saw great business value in drawing connections between itself and the illustrious inventor. Thomas Edison and his family, however, believed that the aging inventor was being used and appealed to Henry Ford, Edison's long-time friend. Eventually, the celebration turned into a collaboration between Henry Ford and General Electric, though Ford won control over much of the ceremony, which he relocated from its planned location in Schenectady, New York — General Electric's headquarters — to Dearborn, Michigan, the site of Ford's Greenfield Village.

== Events ==
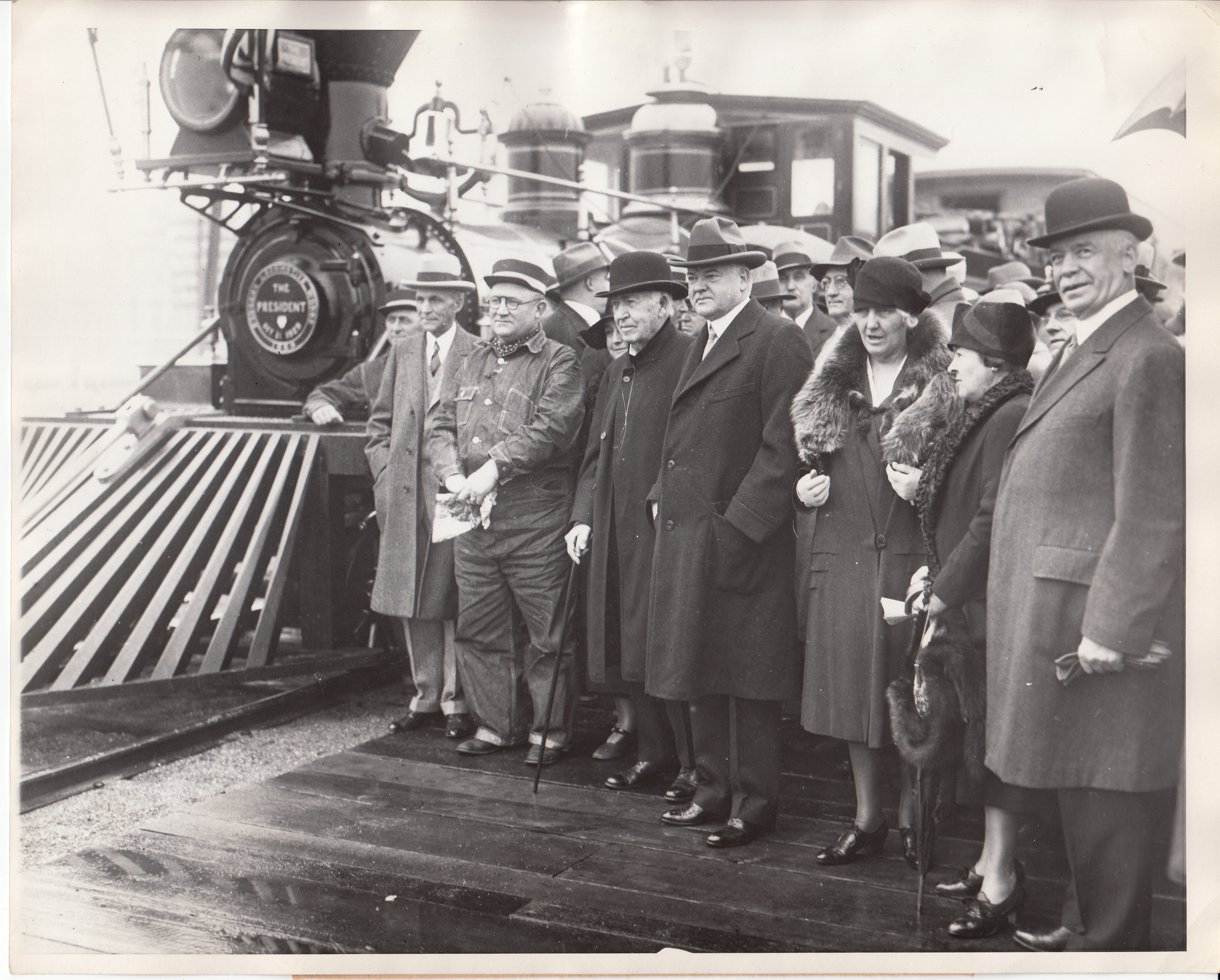
Henry Ford, Herbert Hoover, and Thomas Edison arriving in Dearborn

The events began with a train procession to Dearborn, with Edison getting off at the Smith Creek Station, where he had been ejected as a young telegraph operator many years before.

Once the inventor had arrived in Dearborn, in what Benedict Anderson has called "an experience of simultaneity", millions from around the country were invited to join in the commemoration of the ‘father of light.’ The entire country was urged to turn off their lights for the evening, only to flick the switch back on at the exact moment when the elderly and emotional Edison, seated in his now-relocated laboratory in Greenfield Village, connected two wires to recreate the exact moment of the invention of the light bulb, a moment broadcast over the radio airwaves on as many as 140 stations.

The evening concluded with numerous speeches at a formal candlelight dinner, which took place in Ford's still unfinished replica of Independence Hall at Greenfield Village, complete with its own Liberty Bell. In attendance were celebrities such as President Herbert Hoover and Mrs. Hoover, in their first voyage outside of the capital since President Hoover's inauguration, Walter Chrysler, Marie Curie, George Eastman, Aimée de Heeren, Treasury Secretary Andrew Mellon, Adolph Ochs, John D. Rockefeller Jr., Will Rogers, Julius Rosenwald, Charles Schwab, and Orville Wright, with Albert Einstein chiming in during the speeches via a special radio hookup.

In response to the praise lavished upon him, Edison, overcome with emotion, said, "The experience makes me realize as never before that Americans are sentimental and this crowning event of Light’s Golden Jubilee fills me with gratitude. I thank our president and you all. As to Henry Ford, words are inadequate to express my feelings. I can only say to you that, in the fullest and richest meaning of the term—he is my friend."

The preceding year had similarly been filled with smaller-scale demonstrations of the influence of Edison's innovations: electrical displays across the country; Broadway signs temporarily darkened to show the difference their light made in the atmosphere of cities across the country; and an "open season" for biographies, newspaper articles, and commemorations of the inventor.

=== The Thomas Edison Institute ===
As part of the celebration, Ford formally dedicated Greenfield Village to his friend Thomas Edison, a man who once encouraged a young Henry Ford to pursue the creation of a gasoline powered automobile. Upon hearing of Ford's efforts to create a "carriage without any horses", Edison urged the young inventor along, shouting, as Ford himself recalls it, "Young man, that’s the thing!" and emphatically banging his fist on a table.

A landmark component of Ford's creation was Edison's original laboratory, library, and machine shop from Edison's home of Menlo Park, New Jersey, relocated by Ford "at great cost" and complete with seven train cars of, as Edison put it, the same "damn New Jersey clay". The only difference, Edison claimed, between this relocated laboratory and his original was that "we never kept it as clean as this!" Ultimately, Henry Ford spent about $3 million on Greenfield Village's collection of "Edisonia" alone. After Edison's death, the Henry Ford Museum at Greenfield Village would hold the inventor's literal last breath, trapped, at Ford's request, in a bottle by Edison's son.
