= Precious Lord: New Recordings of the Great Songs of Thomas A. Dorsey =

Studio album by Thomas A. Dorsey
- Released: January 1, 1973
- Genre: Gospel
- Length: 74:54
- Label: Columbia
- Producer: Thomas A. Dorsey

Professional ratings
Review scores
Source	Rating
Allmusic	5/5 stars

Precious Lord: New Recordings of the Great Songs of Thomas A. Dorsey is a 1973 album by Rev. Thomas A. Dorsey. The recording features Dorsey's account of his life, as well as contemporary performances of his greatest works. Composer of many enduring gospel classics, Dorsey is considered to be the Father of Gospel Music.

In 2002, the Library of Congress honored the album by adding it to the United States National Recording Registry.

== Track listing ==
All tracks are written by Thomas A. Dorsey except "It's A Highway To Heaven" by Dorsey and Mary Gardner. Due to time constraints of the CD format, "Let Us Go Back To God" is omitted from the 1994 CD reissue.

No.	Title	Artist(s)	Length
1.	"Take My Hand, Precious Lord"	Marion Williams	7:31
2.	"It's A Highway To Heaven"	Alex Bradford	3:09
3.	"Let Us Go Back To God"	Sallie Martin	2:37
4.	"Hide Me In Thy Bosom"	The Dixie Hummingbirds	1:56
5.	"I'm Going To Live The Life I Sing About In My Song"	Marion Williams	5:21
6.	"Peace in the Valley"	Robert H. Harris	3:30
7.	"What Could I Do"	Marion Williams	2:38
8.	"I'm Waiting For Jesus"	The Dixie Hummingbirds	3:33
9.	"I Don't Know Why"	Bessie Griffin	4:21
10.	"If You See My Savior"	Alex Bradford	4:54
11.	"If We Never Needed The Lord Before"	Marion Williams	4:07
12.	"Thy Servant's Prayer Amen"	Robert H. Harris	3:03
13.	"Search Me Lord"	Bessie Griffin	2:31
14.	"When The Gates Swing Open"	The Dixie Hummingbirds	3:50
15.	"My Desire"	Delois Barrett Campbell	3:39
16.	"Old Ship Of Zion"	Bessie Griffin	6:05
17.	"How Many Times"	Alex Bradford	3:51
18.	"I'll Tell It Wherever I Go"	Sallie Martin	2:59
19.	"Never Turn Back"	Robert H. Harris	3:31
20.	"The Lord Will Make a Way Somehow"	Marion Williams	4:35
