= Fantasia in G major, BWV 572 =

Organ composition by Johann Sebastian Bach

The Fantasia or Pièce d'Orgue (organ piece) in G major, BWV 572, is a composition for organ by Johann Sebastian Bach.

No autograph of BWV 572 survives. The earliest extant manuscript copies of the piece originated in the 1710s (early version) and 1720s (revised version). The piece was most likely composed in the early years of Bach's tenure at Weimar (1708–1717). The revised version must have been completed at least half a year before Bach moved from Köthen to Leipzig in the spring of 1723.

== History ==
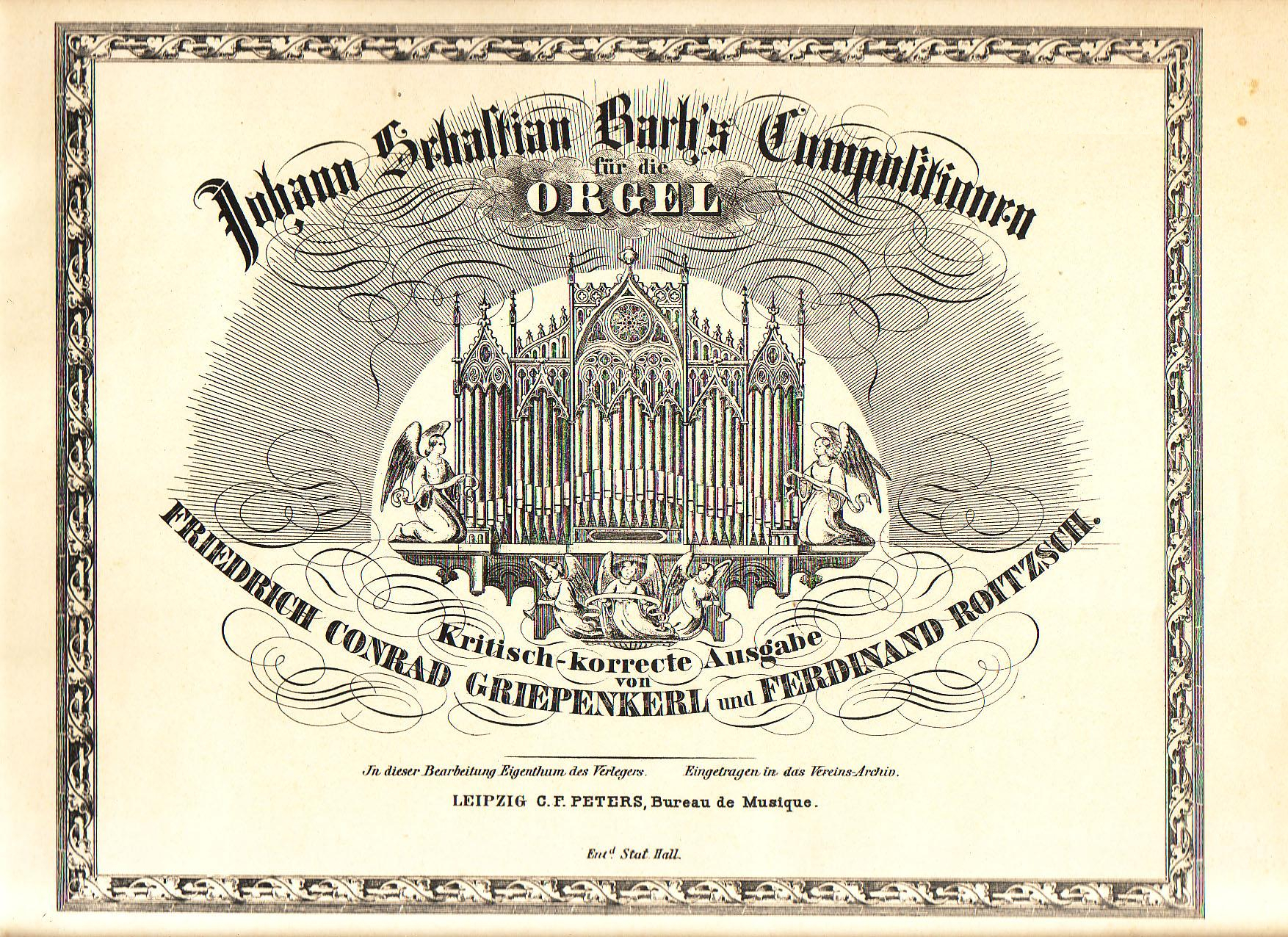
Front page of the 1845-1855 C. F. Peters publication of Bach's organ works edited by Griepenkerl and Roitzsch: its 4th volume contains BWV 572.

An early version of BWV 572 was copied by Johann Gottfried Walther. The title page of Walther's manuscript reads Pièce d'Orgue | di | Giov: Sebast: Bach. This copy was probably made around 1714–1717. According to George B. Stauffer, Bach composed this early version between 1708 and c. 1712. Jean-Claude Zehnder supposes that this version of the piece was composed in Bach's early Weimar years, while also mentioning Siegbert Rampe's contention that it may have been somewhat later. The earliest extant copies of Bach's revised version date from the 1720s, and these manuscripts also carry the title Pièce d'Orgue. The oldest extant copy of the revised version was written by a Köthen pupil in late 1722, around half a year before Bach moved to Leipzig. A manuscript (now lost) which served for the publication of the piece in 1846 was, according to Peter Williams, likely titled Fantasia. Philipp Spitta, naming the work Fantasia in the 1873 first volume of his biography of Bach, considered it more Buxtehude-like than any other composition by Bach. The Bach Gesellschaft published the piece as Fantasie (converting its spelling from Italian to German) in 1891. A century later, the New Bach Edition returned to the name found in the early manuscripts, i.e. Pièce d'Orgue. Breitkopf's 21st-century new Urtext edition also uses this name for BWV 572.

Most printed editions entitle it a Fantasia, but many recitalists refer to it in their programmes as "Pièce d'Orgue", its title in all the contemporary copies; but this, according to Peter Williams, is possibly misleading as well, as there is little French about the music itself except the use of ninths and sevenths in the style of de Grigny (in the middle alla breve section) and the possible allusion to French plein jeu music (by the choice of the key of G major). The work could more accurately be described as a toccata, since it shares in the tradition of sectional toccatas (as conveyed by Buxtehude) in which a central contrapuntal section is surrounded by a toccata-like framework.

== Structure ==
The piece starts in compound quadruple meter (12/8). This movement is very dynamic and cheerful, and features complete absence of the pedal. The broken chords shared between left and right hand do not seem to have a parallel in any work by another composer, though Williams notes a similarity in the "idea of running semiquavers for hands followed by a sustained durezza passage with pedals" with a prelude by Christian Friedrich Witt. The youthful vigor and digital dexterity of the opening movement leads to a broken tonic pedal point, which then transitions to the contrapuntal central section which features five voices. In contrast to the first movement, it employs the entire range of the instrument. The dense texture of the movement makes it more idiomatic for the instrument and more typical for Bach. The movement uses long held chords with many suspensions to great effect, an idiom which Bach employed with relative frequency in his mature works.

The contrapuntal section does not resolve to its key chord, and instead leads via an evaded cadence into a coda which shows close similarities to the final line of BWV 565, Bach's Toccata and Fugue in D minor.

== Reception ==
A Netherlands Bach Society article calls this piece an exercise in French style for which Bach used the Livre d’Orgue from 1700 by the French organist and composer Nicolas de Grigny as a starting point. The same article states: "The way in which [Bach] proceeded to put his own stamp on this style in the Pièce d’Orgue is admirable and dazzling."
