= Frank Lambert (inventor) =

French American inventor (1851–1937)

- Frank Lambert in 1926
- Born: Francois Lambert; June 13, 1851; Lyon, France
- Died: 1937 (aged 85–86)
- Occupation: Inventor

The complete Experimental Talking Clock recording

Francois Lambert (13 June 1851 – 1937) was a French American inventor. Lambert is perhaps best known today for making the oldest sound recording reproducible on its own device (1878) on his own version of the phonograph. Lambert also invented a typewriter on which the keyboard consists of one single piece.

== Work ==
Lambert was born in Lyon, France; he relocated to the United States in 1876 and became a U.S. citizen in 1893.

Twelve years after arriving in the U.S., Lambert, along with a friend John Thomson, founded The Thomson Water Meter Co. to manufacture their design of a water meter.

In 1878 or 1879 he built his own version of Edison's sound recording device, the Phonograph, and recorded himself calling out the hours for an Experimental Talking Clock he was developing for the Ansonia Clock Company in Connecticut. However, the attempts to make a commercially viable "phonograph clock" proved unsuccessful.

After being restored by Aaron Cramer, Lambert's talking clock is currently at the National Watch and Clock Museum in Columbia, PA, and is listed in The Guinness Book of World Records and in The Encyclopedia of Recorded Sound as the world's oldest playable recording. Until 2008 it was considered to be the oldest surviving sound recording but a phonautogram of Au Clair de la Lune by Édouard-Léon Scott de Martinville from 1860 has been found to pre-date it. However, Lambert's recording is still the oldest which can be played with its own original device, unlike the phonautogram which was played by optically scanning it and using a computer to process the scan into a digital audio file.

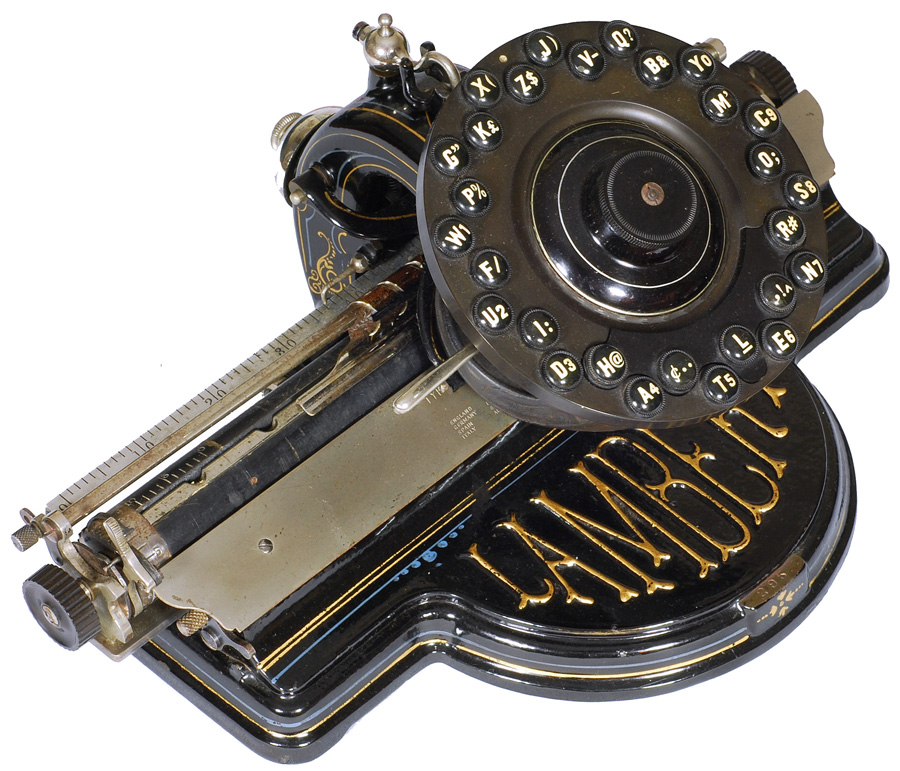
Lambert 1 typewriter, 1902

Lambert completed his main invention, a typewriter on which the keyboard consists of one single piece. He sold it to the Gramophone Co. Ltd., for which he received US$20,000. Lambert's water meter company was sold outright to the Neptune Water Meter Co. and Lambert received $800,000.

During his career he registered over 30 patents for, among other things, typewriters, water meters, a voting machine, and a double-decked car.
