= Experimental Talking Clock =

Early playable sound recording

The "Experimental Talking Clock" was recorded c. 1878 by inventor Frank Lambert. It was long thought to be the world's oldest playable sound recording and is listed in both the Guinness Book of World Records and The Encyclopedia of Recorded Sound as such; however, an older phonautogram recording of "Au clair de la lune" from 1860 by Édouard-Léon Scott de Martinville was reproduced for the first time in 2008 with the aid of modern technology. The talking clock is still the oldest recording that can be played back with its own mechanism, without the involvement of digital technology.

The complete recording

The recording cylinder of the Experimental Talking Clock is a part of the recording device itself and cannot be easily changed. Seeking to create a more durable recording, Lambert chose to experiment with a cylinder made of lead rather than the more common practice of recording onto a wrapping of tin foil. Lasting 1 minute 40 seconds, the hand-cranked recording features an assortment of peculiar sounds, from Lambert calling out the hours of the day to indistinct speech and what may be chimes or bells. Portions of the recording sound in reverse, which raises the possibility that the phonograph may have been cranked counter-clockwise during certain points of recording.
