= Fotoliptófono =

Analog optical device that records sound on a paper

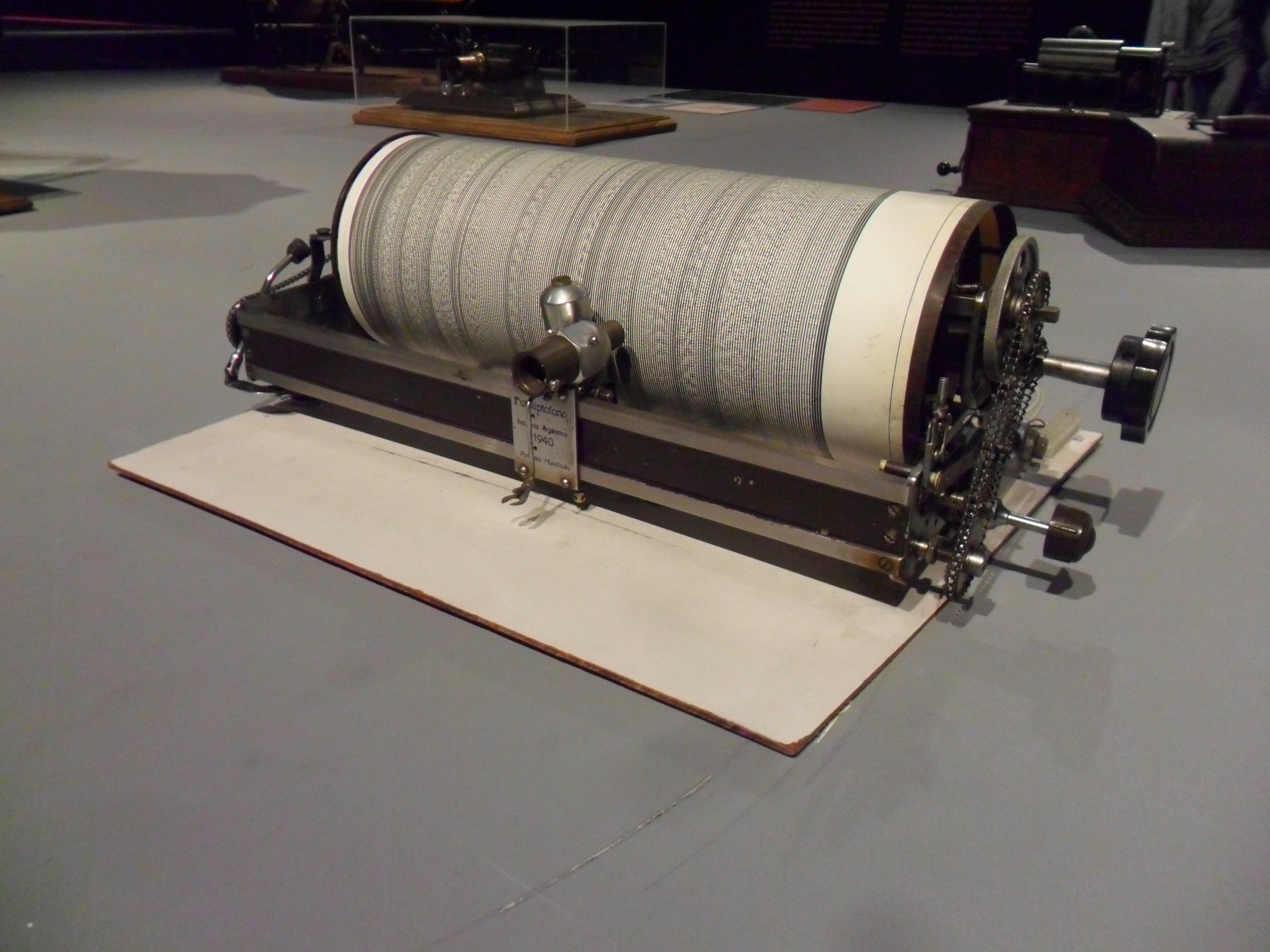
Fotoliptófono.

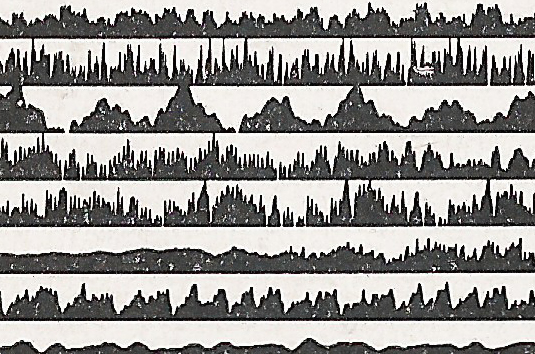
Detail of the sound page

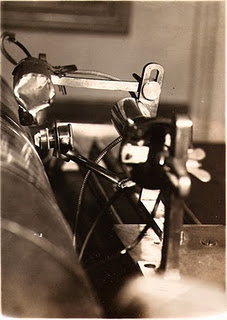
Device pickup head.

The fotoliptófono (English: photoliptophone) is an analog optical device that records audible sound on paper media, invented by Argentine engineer Fernando Crudo.

== History ==
Initially, Fernando Crudo had built a device capable of recording sound—pressure variations that occur and travel through the air. These variations were imprinted with common ink onto paper. The fotoliptófono allows sound to be reproduced on ordinary paper without any physical relief, one of its major advantages being that there was no friction between the playback head and the support paper, thus eliminating wear. The recording system was expensive, complex, and cumbersome, using a process similar to that of emerging sound film technology. However, playback was far simpler and could be achieved with compact equipment. Crudo patented the invention on 23 November 1934. The first granted patent dates to 2 February 1931, numbered 35,284 and titled "New Phonographic Reproduction". It involved a disc-shaped paper recording system where information was printed via variable density (grayscale levels). During the 1930s, Crudo obtained multiple patents in Argentina and 30 other countries.

The French newspaper Le Journal in Paris published an entire page dedicated to printed sound information on 15 July 1933. One of the pages contained just over two minutes of sound printed on paper, or an "oscillogram" as it is known. This marked the first time such content was published through a mass medium. The page featured the tango "Bésame otra vez" ("Kiss Me Again") performed by Osvaldo Fresedo, an unpublished piece by the musician, as it does not appear in his discography.

Crudo based his work on the recording system of early sound film technology.

For the recording process, Crudo used large rectangular photosensitive film (radiographic film material) wound around a cylinder. During recording, the cylinder rotated, and the recording head generated light variations proportional to the voltage fluctuations from the sound captured by the microphone. Once the recording was complete, the photosensitive film was developed. The resulting image was then printed onto paper.

To reproduce the fotoliptograma (English: photoliptogram), the system projects a concentrated beam of light onto the medium (which could be any paper, including newsprint). As the cylinder rotates, the spiral line of bands on the cylinder is progressively scanned by the light beam's reflection. These variable reflections are captured by a photosensitive cell, converting them into electrical voltage fluctuations that are then amplified to play back the sound recorded on the paper.

Crudo intended to publish music and speeches in newspapers. In 1936, three European newspapers distributed full pages with sound information produced using the fotoliptófono (photoliptophone), created to promote the system. These pages were published in the newspapers Paris-Soir and Le Journal of France on 15 July 1933, and in The Morning Post of England on 13 November of the same year. The invention was also featured in several newspapers in Spain.

== See also ==
- History of sound recording

== Sources ==
- Canalis, Ianina (2010). "El fotoliptófono y sus páginas sonoras. Un reproductor de sonido en la Argentina de los años '30". In Espinosa, Susana (ed.). Escritos sobre Audiovision. Lenguajes, Tecnologías, Producciones [Writings on Audiovision: Languages, Technologies, Productions]. Remedios de Escalada: EdUNLa. pp. 151–166. ISBN 978-987-1326-45-7.
- Canalis, Ianina; Petrosino, Jorge (2014). "¿Cuánta música cabe en una página de periódico? Sonido impreso en papel a principios del siglo XX" [How Much Music Fits on a Newspaper Page? Sound Printed on Paper in the Early 20th Century] (PDF). Questión. 1 (42). La Plata, Argentina. ISSN 1669-6581.
