= Encyclopedia of Recorded Sound =

Reference work

The Encyclopedia of Recorded Sound is a reference work that, among other things, describes the history of sound recordings, from November 1877 when Edison developed the first model of a cylinder phonograph, and earlier, in 1857, when Léon Scott de Martinville invented the phonautograph. The first edition – Guy Anthony Marco, PhD (born 1927) (editor), and Frank Andrews (1920–2015) (contributing editor) – was published in 1993. The second 2-volume edition, published in 2005, spans 147 years of recorded sound. Frank W. Hoffman, PhD (born 1949), of Sam Houston State University is Editor and Howard William Ferstler (born 1943) of Florida State University is Technical Editor.

== Comments ==
The second edition – 1,289 pages – is, according to reviewer Grove Koger, "substantially revised." As stated in the Introduction, more than sixty percent of its content is new, and all entries retained from the first edition have been updated. James E. Perone, PhD, of the University of Mount Union wrote that the second edition "appears to be the most comprehensive reference on recorded sound, encompassing entries found in The New Grove Dictionary of Music and Musicians, The New Grove Dictionary of American Music, and The New Grove Dictionary of Jazz."

== Bibliography ==
=== References ===
- For the Record (Autumn 2015). "Obituaries: Frank Andrews" (September 4, 1920 – June 26, 2015). (55): 367. The City of London Phonograph and Gramophone Society. ISSN 1476-816X; OCLC 50229637 (all editions).
- Hoffman, Frank W. (1977). "A Methodological Study of Librarian and Community Attitudes Concerning Public Library Phonorecord Collections in Allegheny County" (PhD dissertation, English). University of Pittsburgh. OCLC 3440485 (all editions).
- Hoffman, Frank; Ferstler, Howard, eds. (2005) [1993]. Encyclopedia of Recorded Sound (2 Vols.) (2nd ed.). Routledge. LCCN 2003-26491; ISBN 978-0-4159-3835-8; OCLC 65174453 (all editions).
1. Vol. 1: "A–L". 2005 – via Internet Archive (Kahle/Austin Foundation).
2. Vol. 1: "A–L" – via Google Books (limited preview).
3. Vol. 1: "A–L" – via Google Books (limited preview).
4. Vol. 2: "M–Z" & "Index". 2005 – via Internet Archive (Kahle/Austin Foundation).
- Johnson, Curt, ed. (1992). "Ferstler, Howard William". Who's Who in Writers, Editors & Poets. United States & Canada; 1992–1993 (4th ed.). Highland Park, Illinois: December Press. p. 152. ISBN 9780913204252 – via Internet Archive (Kahle/Austin Foundation). LCCN 87-648220; ISSN 1049-8621; ISBN 0-9132-0425-0.
- Marco, Guy A.; Andrews, Frank, eds. (1993). Encyclopedia of Recorded Sound in the United States. Series: Garland Reference Library of the Humanities (Vol. 936) (1st ed.). New York: Garland Publishing. LCCN 93-18166; ISBN 978-0-8240-4782-5, 0-8240-4782-6; OCLC 27431101 (all editions).
1. Pdf copy (PDF) – via World Radio History, site maintained by David Frackelton Gleason (born 1946), Cleveland.
- Who's Who in Library and Information Services → "Marco, Guy Anthony". American Library Association. 1982. p. 305. ISBN 9780838903513 – via Internet Archive (Kahle/Austin Foundation). LCCN 81-20480; ISBN 0-8389-0351-7; OCLC 0838903517 (all editions).
Reviews
- Adam, Anthony J. of Prairie View A&M (July 1, 1993). Book Review: "Encyclopedia of Recorded Sound in the United States". Library Journal. 118 (12): 68. ISSN 0363-0277 (publication); EBSCOhost 9307230095 (article); OCLC 5326633349, 8247774560 (article).
- Bulson, Christine (February 1, 2005). Book Review: "Encyclopedia of Recorded Sound". Booklist. 101 (11): 990. ISSN 0006-7385 (publication); EBSCOhost 16118631 (article); OCLC 5296409791, 5781836435 (article).
- Gracyk, Timothy A. (born 1950) (Summer 1995). "Book Review: Encyclopedia of Recorded Sound in the United States Edited by Guy A. Marco". Victrola and 78 Journal (5): 45–48 – via Internet Archive. OCLC 34274741 (all editions).
- Koger, Grove, Reference Librarian, Boise Public Library (Fall 2005). "Encyclopedia of Recorded Sound. 2d ed. by Frank Hoffman". Reference & User Services Quarterly (review). 45 (1): 81–82. JSTOR 20864452. ISSN 1094-9054 (publication); JSTOR 20864452 (article); EBSCOhost 18713729 (article); OCLC 5278859411, 8228558959, 5543205491 (article).
- Perone, James E. (November 15, 2004). Book Review: "Encyclopedia of Recorded Sound". Library Journal. 129 (19): 85. ISSN 0363-0277 (publication); EBSCOhost 15107896 (article); OCLC 5222685103, 8219779910, 5770591442 (article).
