= Pierre-Auguste (given name) =

Pierre-Auguste is a masculine given name. Notable people with the name include:

- Pierre-Auguste Adet, French scientist, politician, and diplomat
- Pierre-Auguste Cot, French painter
- Pierre-Auguste Lafleur, Canadian politician
- Pierre-Auguste Lamy, French engraver, lithographer, and watercolor painter
- Pierre-Auguste Renoir (1841–1919), French Impressionist artist
- Pierre-Auguste Sarrus, French musician and inventor
- Pierre-Auguste Vafflard, French painter

== See also ==
- François-Pierre-Auguste Léger, French playwright
