= History of sound recording =

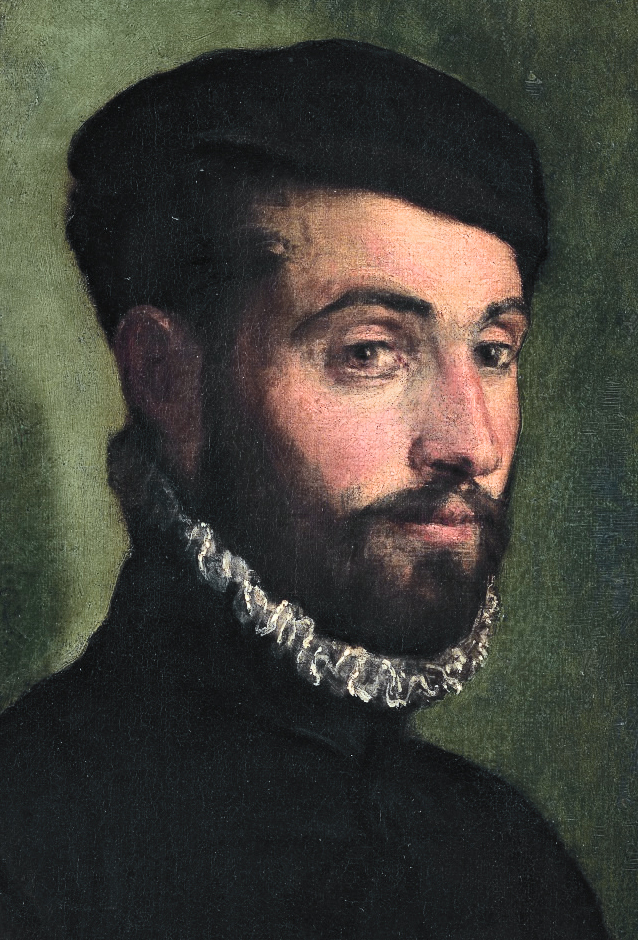
Italian poet Torquato Tasso was known for the earliest recordings of his work in the 1860’s

Au clair de la lune
Oldest known intelligible recording of a human voice in 1860. Played at what is now believed to be the correct speed, the words are "Au clair de la lune, mon ami Pierrot, prête-m—".

The history of sound recording, which has progressed in waves, driven by the invention and commercial introduction of new technologies, can be roughly divided into four main periods:

- The Acoustic era (1877–1925)
- The Electrical era (1925–1945)
- The Magnetic era (1945–1975)
- The Digital era (1975–present)

Experiments in capturing sound on a recording medium for preservation and reproduction began in earnest during the Industrial Revolution of the 1800s. Many pioneering attempts to record and reproduce sound were made during the latter half of the 19th century – notably Édouard-Léon Scott de Martinville's phonautograph of 1857 – and these efforts culminated in the invention of the phonograph by Thomas Edison in 1877.

Digital recording emerged in the late 20th century and has since flourished with the popularity of digital music and online streaming services.

== Overview ==
=== Experiments Before True Playback (1857–1876) ===
The first patented device for intentionally recording sound waveforms was called the "Phonoautograph" and patented in 1857. Nevertheless, the record it produced could not yet be played back out loud. (Modern researchers have discovered that some of these recordings do contain enough information for playable clips to be reconstructed; work between 2007 and 2009 recovered the attached "Au clair de la lune," 1860).

Alongside these early experiments, advances were also being made in the transmission of live audio. Alexander Graham Bell introduced a working telephone in 1876, which helped stimulate the research of Thomas Edison that would produce playable recordings the following year.

=== The Acoustic Era (1877–1925) ===
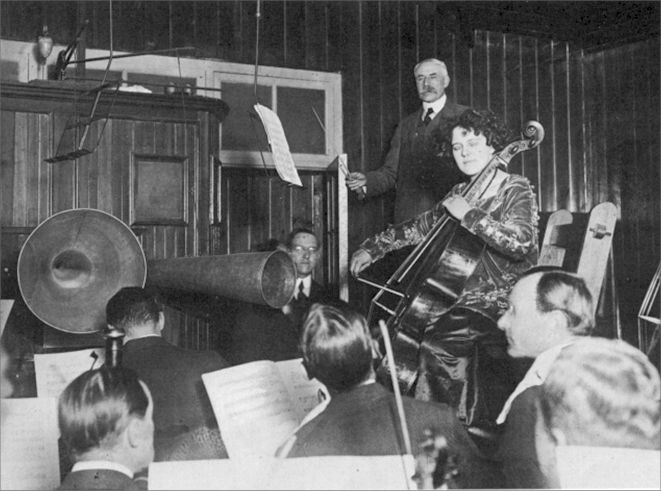
Edward Elgar and Beatrice Harrison during recording sessions for his Cello Concerto in 1920. Note the recording horns placed before the soloist and orchestra.

Edison's phonograph introduced true sound recording capable of playback in 1877. The earliest practical recording technologies were entirely mechanical devices. These recorders typically used a large conical horn to collect and focus the physical air pressure of the sound waves produced by the human voice or musical instruments. A sensitive membrane or diaphragm, located at the apex of the cone, was connected to an articulated scriber or stylus, and as the changing air pressure moved the diaphragm back and forth, the stylus scratched or incised an analog of the sound waves onto a moving recording medium, such as a roll of coated paper, or a cylinder or disc coated with a soft material such as wax or a soft metal.

These early recordings were necessarily of low fidelity and volume and captured only a narrow segment of the audible sound spectrum — typically only from around 250 Hz up to about 2,500 Hz—so musicians and engineers were forced to adapt to these sonic limitations. Musical ensembles of the period often favored louder instruments such as trumpet, cornet, and trombone; lower-register brass instruments such as the tuba and the euphonium doubled or replaced the double bass, and blocks of wood stood in for bass drums. Performers also had to arrange themselves strategically around the horn to balance the sound and to play as loudly as possible. The reproduction of domestic phonographs was similarly limited in both frequency range and volume.

By the end of the acoustic era, the disc had become the standard medium for sound recording, and its dominance in the domestic audio market lasted until the end of the 20th century.

=== The Electrical Era (1925–1945) (including sound on film) ===
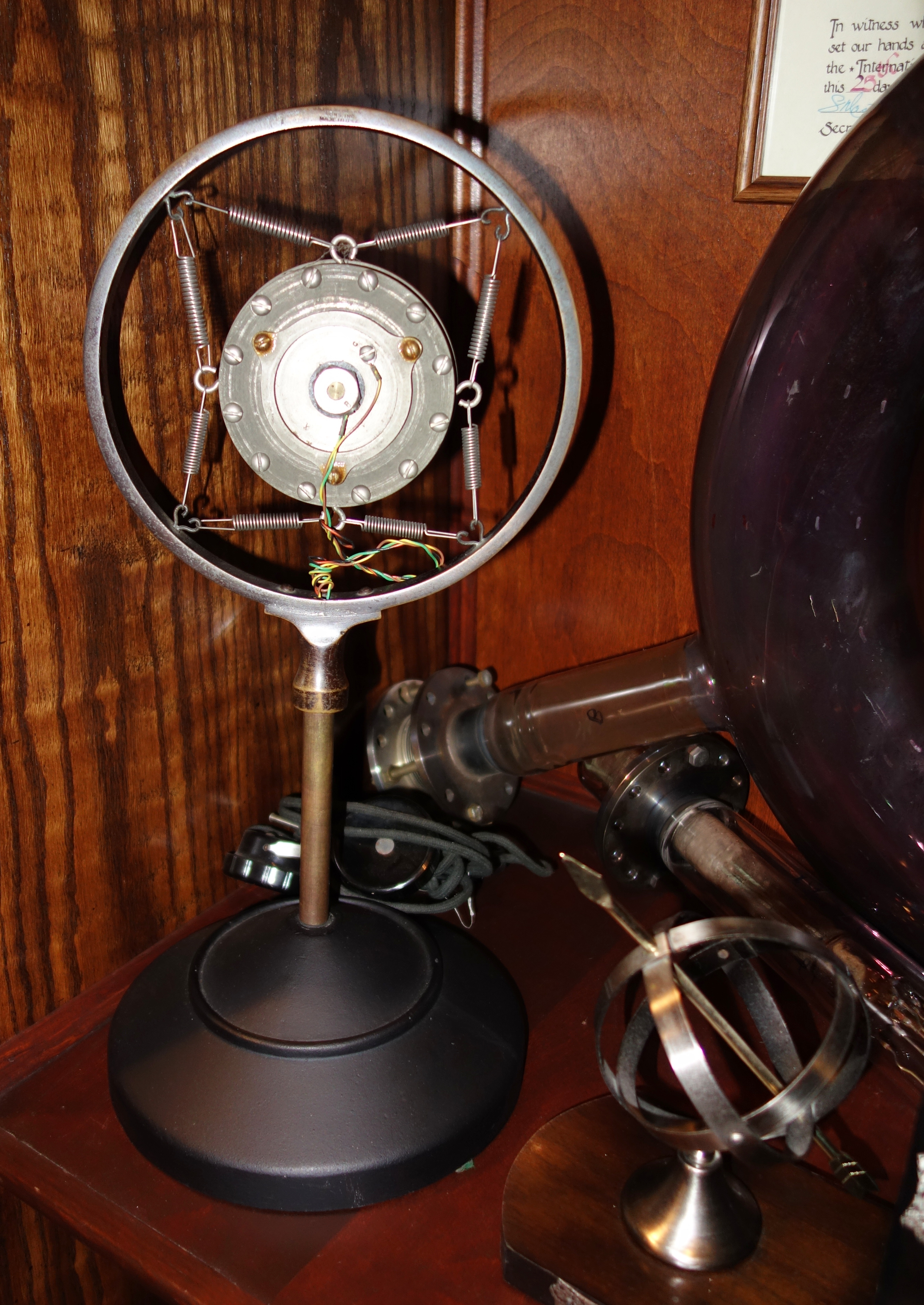
Ring-and-spring microphones, such as this Western Electric microphone, were common during the electrical age of sound recording c. 1925–45.

The second wave of sound recording history was ushered in by the introduction of Western Electric's integrated system of electrical microphones, electronic signal amplifiers and electromechanical recorders, which was adopted by major US record labels in 1925. Sound recording now became a hybrid process — sound could now be captured, amplified, filtered, and balanced electronically, and the disc-cutting head was now electrically powered, but the actual recording process remained essentially mechanical – the signal was still physically inscribed into a wax master disc, and consumer discs were mass-produced mechanically by stamping a metal electroform made from the wax master into a suitable substance, originally a shellac-based compound and later polyvinyl plastic.

The Western Electric system greatly improved the fidelity of sound recording, increasing the reproducible frequency range to a much wider band (between 60 Hz and 6000 Hz) and allowing a new class of professional – the audio engineer – to capture a fuller, richer, and more detailed and balanced sound on record, using multiple microphones connected to multi-channel electronic amplifiers, compressors, filters and mixers. Electrical microphones led to a dramatic change in the performance style of singers, ushering in the age of the crooner, while electronic amplification had a wide-ranging impact in many areas, enabling the development of broadcast radio, public address systems, and electronically amplified home record players.

In addition, the development of electronic amplifiers for musical instruments now enabled quieter instruments such as the guitar and the string bass to compete on equal terms with the naturally louder wind and horn instruments, and musicians and composers also began to experiment with entirely new electronic musical instruments such as the Theremin, the Ondes Martenot, the electronic organ, and the Hammond Novachord, the world's first analog polyphonic synthesizer.

Contemporaneous with these developments, several inventors were engaged in a race to develop practical methods of providing synchronised sound with films. Some early sound films — such as the landmark 1927 film The Jazz Singer – used large soundtrack records which were played on a turntable mechanically interlocked with the projector. By the early 1930s, the movie industry had almost universally adopted sound-on-film technology, in which the audio signal to be recorded was used to modulate a light source that was imaged onto the moving film through a narrow slit, allowing it to be photographed as variations in the density or width of a soundtrack running along a dedicated area of the film. The projector used a steady light and a photoelectric cell to convert the variations back into an electrical signal, which was amplified and sent to loudspeakers behind the screen.

The adoption of sound-on-film also helped movie-industry audio engineers to make rapid advances in the process we now know as multi-tracking, by which multiple separately recorded audio sources (such as voices, sound effects and background music) can be replayed simultaneously, mixed together, and synchronized with the action on film to create new blended audio tracks of complexity. One of the best-known examples of a constructed composite sound from that era is the famous "Tarzan yell" created for the series of Tarzan movies starring Johnny Weissmuller.

Among the vast and often rapid changes that have taken place over the last century of audio recording, it is notable that there is one crucial audio device, invented at the start of the Electrical Era, which has survived virtually unchanged since its introduction in the 1920s: the electro-acoustic transducer, or loudspeaker. The most common form is the dynamic loudspeaker – effectively a dynamic microphone in reverse. This device typically consists of a shallow conical diaphragm, usually of a stiff paper-like material concentrically pleated to make it more flexible, firmly fastened at its perimeter, with the coil of a moving-coil electromagnetic driver attached around its apex. When an audio signal from a recording, a microphone, or an electrified instrument is fed through an amplifier to the loudspeaker, the varying electromagnetic field created in the coil causes it and the attached cone to move backwards and forward, and this movement generates the audio-frequency pressure waves that travel through the air to our ears, which hear them as sound.

Although there have been numerous refinements to the technology, and other related technologies have been introduced (e.g., the electrostatic loudspeaker), the basic design and function of the dynamic loudspeaker has not changed substantially in 90 years, and it remains overwhelmingly the most common, sonically accurate and reliable means of converting electronic audio signals back into audible sound.

=== The Magnetic Era (1945–1975) ===
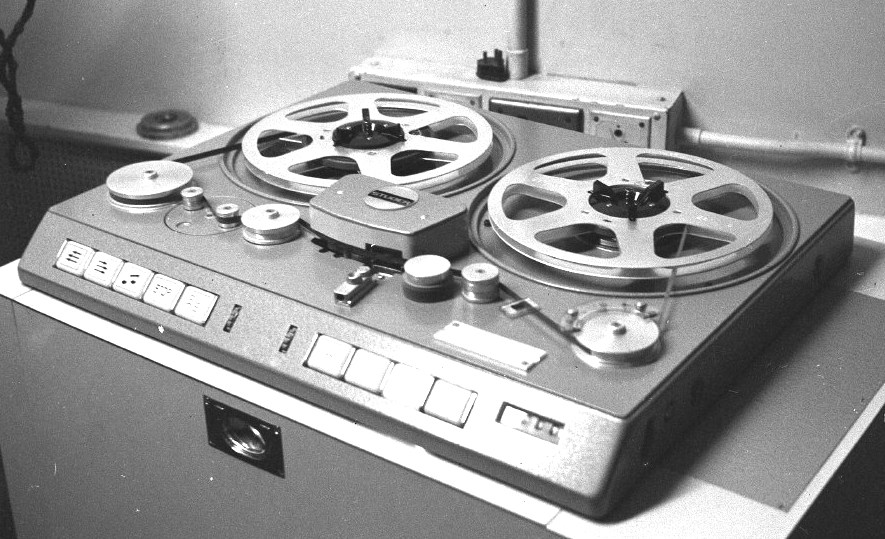
During the magnetic era, sound recordings were usually made on magnetic tape before being transferred to other media.

The third wave of development in audio recording began in 1945 when the Allied nations gained access to a new German invention: magnetic tape recording. The technology was invented in the 1930s but remained restricted to Germany (where it was widely used in broadcasting) until the end of World War II. Magnetic tape provided another dramatic leap in audio fidelity—indeed, Allied observers first became aware of the existence of the new technology because they noticed that the audio quality of obviously pre-recorded programs was practically indistinguishable from live broadcasts.

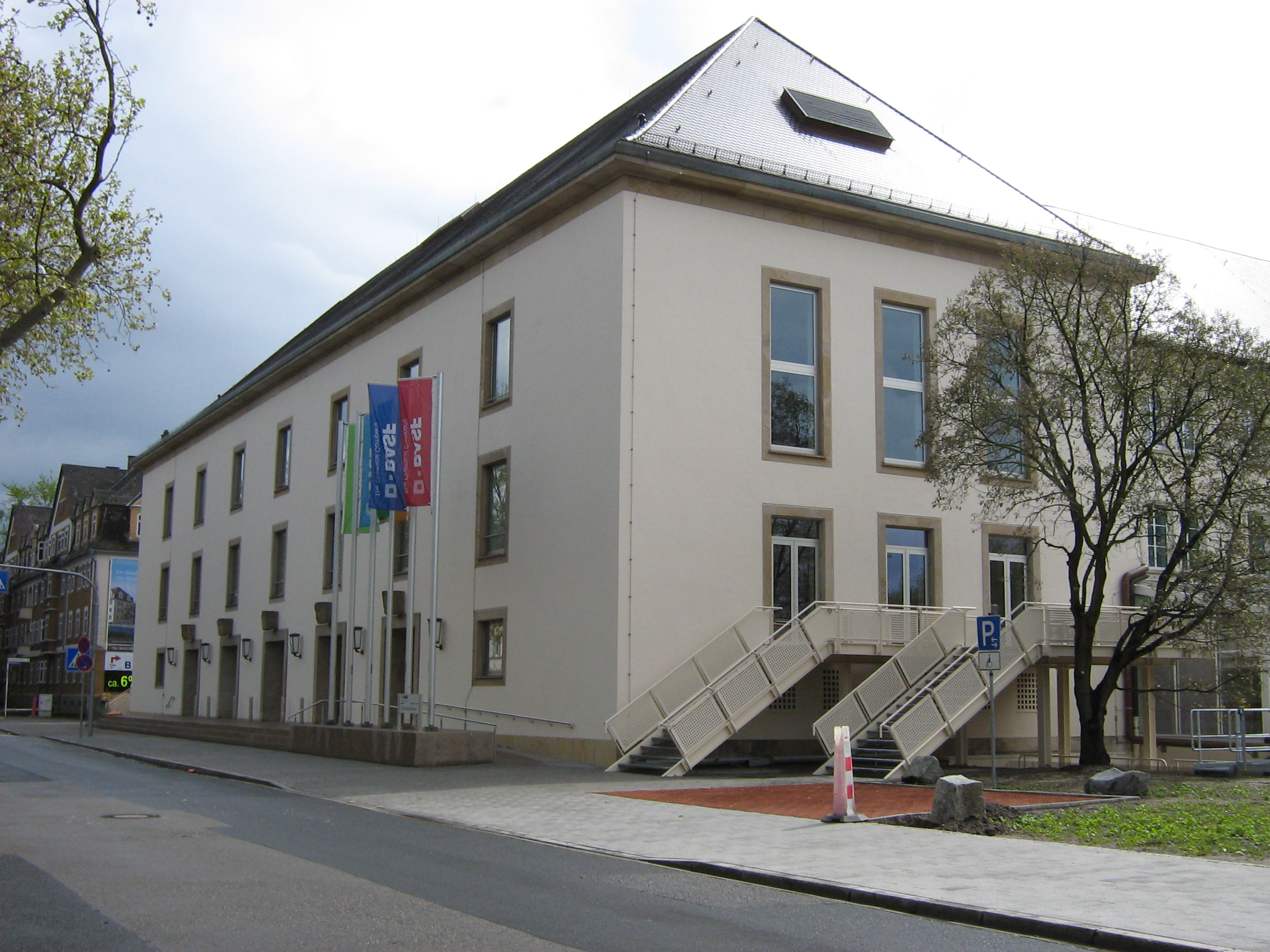
BASF Feierabendhaus

On a controversial 1936 tour of Germany, the London Philharmonic Orchestra inadvertently made the first recognised full sound recording on magnetic tape on 19 November 1936 at the BASF Feierabendhaus (the company auditorium), but the sound was not as good as wax transcription discs, due to DC bias. The orchestra played Symphony No. 39 (Mozart) and Delius's On Hearing the First Cuckoo in Spring.

After a renovation of the BASF building in 2011, the orchestra performed at the reopening, in Germany, on 27 November 2011, with Vladimir Jurowski. It was 75 years after that first recording.

From 1950 onwards, magnetic tape quickly became the standard medium of audio master recording in the radio and music industries and led to the development of the first hi-fi stereo recordings for the domestic market, the development of multi-track tape recording for music, and the demise of the disc as the primary mastering medium for sound. Magnetic tape also brought about a radical reshaping of the recording process—it made possible recordings of far longer duration and much higher fidelity than ever before, and it offered recording engineers the same exceptional plasticity that film gave to cinema editors—sounds captured on tape could now easily be manipulated sonically, edited, and combined in ways that were simply impossible with disc recordings.

These experiments reached an early peak in the 1950s with the recordings of Les Paul and Mary Ford, who pioneered the use of tape editing and multi-tracking to create large virtual ensembles of voices and instruments, constructed entirely from multiple taped recordings of their own voices and instruments. Magnetic tape fueled a rapid and radical expansion in the sophistication of popular music and other genres, allowing composers, producers, engineers and performers to realize previously unattainable levels of complexity. Other concurrent advances in audio technology led to the introduction of a range of new consumer audio formats and devices, on both disc and tape, including the development full-frequency-range disc reproduction, the change from shellac to polyvinyl plastic for disc manufacture, the invention of the 33 rpm, 12-inch (300 mm) long-playing (LP) disc and the 45 rpm 7-inch (180 mm) single, the introduction of domestic and professional portable tape recorders (which enabled high-fidelity recordings of live performances), the popular 4-track cartridge and compact cassette formats, and even the world's first sampling keyboards, the pioneering tape-based keyboard instrument the Chamberlin, and its more famous successor, the Mellotron.

=== The Digital Era (1975–present) ===
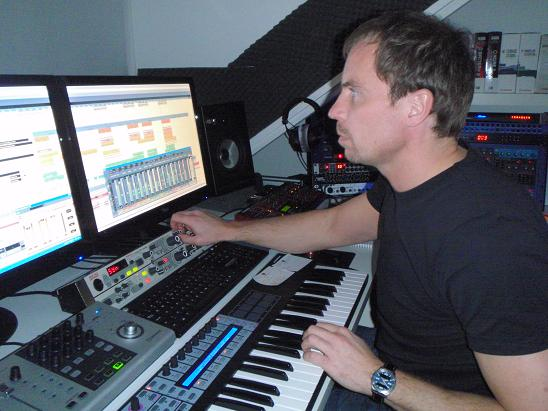
In the digital era, audio recording becomes increasingly dominated by digital audio workstations (DAW).

The fourth and current phase, the digital era, has seen a rapid, dramatic and far-reaching series of changes. In a period of fewer than 20 years, all previous recording technologies were rapidly superseded by digital sound encoding, and the Japanese electronics corporation Sony in the 1970s was instrumental in the introduction of the first consumer PCM encoder, PCM-F1, in 1981. Unlike all previous technologies, which captured a continuous analog of the sounds being recorded, digital recording captured sound by means of a very dense and rapid series of discrete samples of the sound. When played back through a digital-to-analog converter, these audio samples are recombined to form a continuous flow of sound. The first all-digitally-recorded popular music album, Ry Cooder's Bop Till You Drop, was released in 1979, and from that point, digital sound recording and reproduction quickly became the new standard at every level, from the professional recording studio to the home hi-fi.

Although a number of short-lived hybrid studio and consumer technologies appeared in this period (e.g., Digital Audio Tape or DAT, which recorded digital signal samples onto standard magnetic tape), Sony assured the preeminence of its new digital recording system by introducing, together with Philips, the digital compact disc (CD). The compact disc rapidly replaced both the 12 in (300 mm) album and the 7 in (180 mm) single as the new standard consumer format and ushered in a new era of high-fidelity consumer audio.

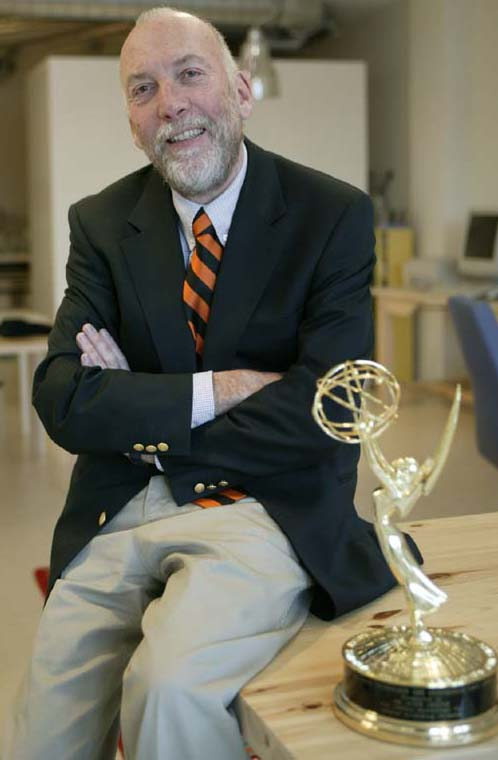
Dutch inventor and Philips chief engineer Kees Schouhamer Immink was part of the team that produced the standard compact disc in 1980.

CDs are small, portable and durable, and they can reproduce the entire audible sound spectrum, with a large dynamic range (~96 dB), perfect clarity and no distortion. Because CDs were encoded and read optically, using a laser beam, there was no physical contact between the disc and the playback mechanism, so a well-cared-for CD could be played over and over, with absolutely no degradation or loss of fidelity. CDs also represented a considerable advance in both the physical size of the medium and its storage capacity. LPs could only practically hold about 20–25 minutes of audio per side because they were physically limited by the size of the disc itself and the density of the grooves that could be cut into it — the longer the recording, the closer together the grooves and thus the lower the overall fidelity. CDs, on the other hand, were less than half the overall size of the old 12 in (300 mm) LP format, but offered about double the duration of the average LP, with up to 80 minutes of audio.

The compact disc almost totally dominated the consumer audio market by the end of the 20th century, but within another decade, rapid developments in computing technology saw it rendered virtually redundant in just a few years by the most significant new invention in the history of audio recording—the digital audio file (.wav, .mp3 and other formats). When combined with newly developed digital signal compression algorithms, which greatly reduced file sizes, digital audio files came to dominate the domestic market, thanks to commercial innovations such as Apple's iTunes media application, and their popular iPod portable media player.

However, the introduction of digital audio files, in concert with the rapid developments in home computing, soon led to an unforeseen consequence — the widespread unlicensed distribution of audio and other digital media files. The uploading and downloading of large volumes of digital media files at high speed was facilitated by freeware file-sharing technologies such as Napster and BitTorrent.

Although infringement remains a significant issue for copyright owners, the development of digital audio has had considerable benefits for consumers and labels. In addition to facilitating the high-volume, low-cost transfer and storage of digital audio files, this new technology has also powered an explosion in the availability of so-called back-catalog titles stored in the archives of recording labels, thanks to the fact that labels can now convert old recordings and distribute them digitally at a fraction of the cost of physically reissuing albums on LP or CD. Digital audio has also enabled dramatic improvements in the restoration and remastering of acoustic and pre-digital electric recordings, and even freeware consumer-level digital software can very effectively eliminate scratches, surface noise and other unwanted sonic artifacts from old 78 rpm and vinyl recordings and greatly enhance the sound quality of all but the most badly damaged records. In the field of consumer-level digital data storage, the continuing trend towards increasing capacity and falling costs means that consumers can now acquire and store vast quantities of high-quality digital media (audio, video, games and other applications), and build up media libraries consisting of tens or even hundreds of thousands of songs, albums, or videos — collections which, for all but the wealthiest, would have been both physically and financially impossible to amass in such quantities if they were on 78 or LP, yet which can now be contained on storage devices no larger than the average hardcover book.

The digital audio file marked the end of one era in recording and the beginning of another. Digital files effectively eliminated the need to create or use a discrete, purpose-made physical recording medium (a disc, or a reel of tape, etc.) as the primary means of capturing, manufacturing and distributing commercial sound recordings. Concurrent with the development of these digital file formats, dramatic advances in home computing and the rapid expansion of the Internet mean that digital sound recordings can now be captured, processed, reproduced, distributed and stored entirely electronically, on a range of magnetic and optical recording media, and these can be distributed anywhere in the world, with no loss of fidelity, and crucially, without the need to first transfer these files to some form of permanent recording medium for shipment and sale.

Music streaming services have gained popularity since the late 2000s. Streaming audio does not require the listener to own the audio files. Instead, they listen over the internet. Streaming services offer an alternative method of consuming music and some follow a freemium business model. The freemium model many music streaming services use provides a limited amount of content for free, and then premium services for payment. There are two categories in which streaming services are categorized, radio or on-demand. Streaming services such as Pandora use the radio model, allowing users to select playlists but not specific songs to listen to, while services such as Apple Music allow users to listen to both individual songs and pre-made playlists.

== Acoustical recording ==
The earliest method of sound recording and reproduction involved the live recording of a performance directly to a recording medium by an entirely mechanical process, often called acoustical recording. In the standard procedure used until the mid-1920s, the sounds generated by the performance vibrated a diaphragm with a recording stylus connected to it while the stylus cut a groove into a soft recording medium rotating beneath it. To make this process as efficient as possible, the diaphragm was located at the apex of a hollow cone that served to collect and focus the acoustical energy, with the performers crowded around the other end. Recording balance was achieved empirically. A performer who recorded too strongly or not strongly enough would be moved away from or nearer to the mouth of the cone. The number and kind of instruments that could be recorded were limited. Brass instruments, which recorded well, often substituted for instruments such as cellos and bass fiddles, which did not. In some early jazz recordings, a block of wood was used in place of the snare drum, which could easily overload the recording diaphragm.

=== Phonautograph ===
In 1857, Édouard-Léon Scott de Martinville invented the phonautograph, the first device that could record sound waves as they passed through the air. It was intended only for visual study of the recording and could not play back the sound. The recording medium was a sheet of soot-coated paper wrapped around a rotating cylinder carried on a threaded rod. A stylus, attached to a diaphragm through a series of levers, traced a line through the soot, creating a graphic record of the motions of the diaphragm as it was minutely propelled back and forth by the audio-frequency variations in air pressure.

In the spring of 1877, another inventor, Charles Cros, suggested that the process could be reversed by using photoengraving to convert the traced line into a groove that would guide the stylus, causing the original stylus vibrations to be recreated, passed on to the linked diaphragm, and sent back into the air as sound. Edison's invention of the phonograph soon eclipsed this idea, and it was not until 1887 that yet another inventor, Emile Berliner, actually photoengraved a phonautograph recording into metal and played it back.

Scott's early recordings languished in French archives until 2008, when scholars keen to resurrect the sounds captured in these and other types of early experimental recordings tracked them down. Rather than using rough 19th-century technology to create playable versions, they were scanned into a computer and software was used to convert their sound-modulated traces into digital audio files. Brief excerpts from two French songs and a recitation in Italian, all recorded in 1860, are the most substantial results.

=== Phonograph/Gramophone ===
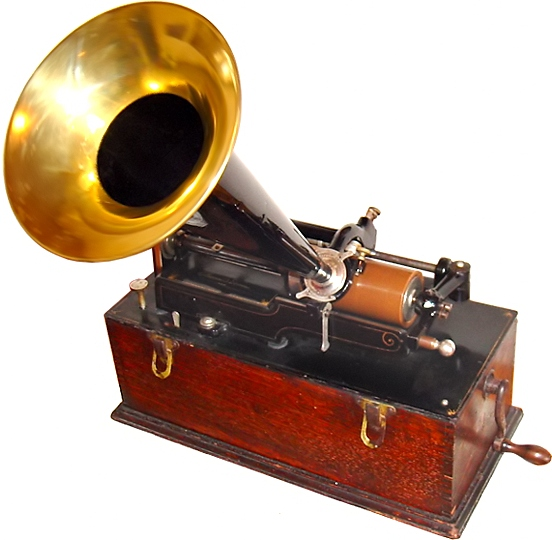
An Edison Home Phonograph for recording and playing brown wax cylinders, c. 1899

The phonograph, invented by Thomas Edison in 1877, could both record sound and play it back. The earliest type of phonograph recorded on a thin sheet of tinfoil wrapped around a grooved metal cylinder. A stylus connected to a sound-vibrated diaphragm indented the foil into the groove as the cylinder rotated. The stylus vibration was at a right angle to the recording surface, so the depth of the indentation varied with the audio-frequency changes in air pressure that carried the sound. This arrangement is known as vertical or hill-and-dale recording. The sound could be played back by tracing the stylus along the recorded groove and acoustically coupling its resulting vibrations to the surrounding air through the diaphragm and a so-called amplifying horn.

The crude tinfoil phonograph proved to be of little use except as a novelty. It was not until the late 1880s that an improved and much more useful form of the phonograph was marketed. The new machines recorded on easily removable hollow wax cylinders, and the groove was engraved into the surface rather than indented. The targeted use was business communication, and in that context, the cylinder format had some advantages. When entertainment use proved to be the real source of profits, one seemingly negligible disadvantage became a major problem: the difficulty of making copies of a recorded cylinder in large quantities.

At first, cylinders were copied by acoustically connecting a playback machine to one or more recording machines through flexible tubing, an arrangement that degraded the audio quality of the copies. Later, a pantograph mechanism was used, but it could only produce about 25 fair copies before the original was too worn down. During a recording session, as many as a dozen machines could be arrayed in front of the performers to record multiple originals. Still, a single take would ultimately yield only a few hundred copies at best, so performers were booked for marathon recording sessions in which they had to repeat their most popular numbers over and over again. By 1902, successful molding processes for manufacturing prerecorded cylinders had been developed.

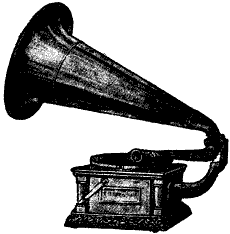
Spring-motor-powered disc record player, c. 1909

The wax cylinder got a competitor with the advent of the Gramophone, which was patented by Emile Berliner in 1887. The vibration of the Gramophone's recording stylus was horizontal, parallel to the recording surface, resulting in a zig-zag groove of constant depth. This is known as lateral recording. Berliner's original patent showed a lateral recording etched around the surface of a cylinder, but in practice, he opted for the disc format. The Gramophones he soon began to market were intended solely for playing prerecorded entertainment discs and could not be used to record. The spiral groove on the flat surface of a disc was relatively easy to replicate: a negative metal electrotype of the original record could be used to stamp out hundreds or thousands of copies before it wore out. Early on, the copies were made of hard rubber, and sometimes of celluloid, but soon a shellac-based compound was adopted.

Gramophone, Berliner's trademark name, was abandoned in the US in 1900 because of legal complications, with the result that in American English Gramophones and Gramophone records, along with disc records and players made by other manufacturers, were long ago brought under the umbrella term phonograph, a word which Edison's competitors avoided using but which was never his trademark, simply a generic term he introduced and applied to cylinders, discs, tapes and any other formats capable of carrying a sound-modulated groove. In the UK, proprietary use of the name Gramophone continued for another decade until, in a court case, it was adjudged to have become genericized and so could be used freely by competing disc record makers, with the result that in British English a disc record is called a gramophone record and phonograph record is traditionally assumed to mean a cylinder.

Not all cylinder records are alike. They were made of various soft or hard waxy formulations or early plastics, sometimes in unusual sizes; they did not all use the same groove pitch, and were not all recorded at the same speed. Early brown wax cylinders were usually cut at about 120 rpm, whereas later cylinders ran at 160 rpm for clearer and louder sound at the cost of reduced maximum playing time. As a medium for entertainment, the cylinder was already losing the format war with the disc by 1910, but the production of entertainment cylinders did not entirely cease until 1929, and use of the format for business dictation purposes persisted into the 1950s.

Disc records, too, were sometimes made in unusual sizes, or from unusual materials, or otherwise deviated from the format norms of their eras in some substantial way. The speed at which disc records were rotated was eventually standardized at about 78 rpm, but other speeds were sometimes used. Around 1950, slower speeds became standard: 45, 33 1/3, and the rarely used 16 2/3 rpm. The standard material for discs changed from shellac to vinyl, although vinyl had been used for some special-purpose records since the early 1930s, and some 78 rpm shellac records were still being made in the late 1950s.

== Electrical recording ==
Until the mid-1920s, records were played on purely mechanical record players, usually powered by a wind-up spring motor. The sound was amplified by an external or internal horn that was coupled to the diaphragm and stylus, although there was no real amplification: the horn simply improved the efficiency with which the diaphragm's vibrations were transmitted into the open air. The recording process was, in essence, the same non-electronic setup operating in reverse, but with a recording, stylus engraving a groove into a soft, waxy master disc, and carried slowly inward across it by a feed mechanism.

The advent of electrical recording in 1925 made it possible to use sensitive microphones to capture the sound and greatly improved the audio quality of records. A much wider range of frequencies could be recorded, the balance of high and low frequencies could be controlled by elementary electronic filters, and the signal could be amplified to the optimum level for driving the recording stylus. The leading record labels switched to the electrical process in 1925 and the rest soon followed, although one straggler in the US held out until 1929.

There was a period of nearly five years, from 1925 to 1930 when the top audiophile technology for home sound reproduction consisted of a combination of electrically recorded records with the specially developed Victor Orthophonic Victrola, an acoustic phonograph that used waveguide engineering and a folded horn to provide a reasonably flat frequency response. The first electronically amplified record players reached the market only a few months later, around the start of 1926, but at first, they were much more expensive and their audio quality was impaired by their primitive loudspeakers; they did not become common until the late 1930s.

Electrical recording increased the flexibility of the process, but the performance was still cut directly to the recording medium, so if a mistake was made, the whole recording was spoiled. Disc-to-disc editing was possible by using multiple turntables to play parts of different takes and recording them to a new master disc, but switching sources with split-second accuracy was difficult, and lower sound quality was inevitable, so except for use in editing some early sound films and radio recordings it was rarely done.

Electrical recording made it more feasible to record one part to a disc and then play that back while playing another part, recording both parts to a second disc. This and conceptually related techniques, known as overdubbing, enabled studios to create recorded performances that feature one or more artists each singing multiple parts or playing multiple instrument parts and that therefore could not be duplicated by the same artist or artists performing live. The first commercially issued records using overdubbing were released by the Victor Talking Machine Company in the late 1920s. However, overdubbing was of limited use until the advent of audio tape. Use of tape overdubbing was pioneered by Les Paul in the 1940s.

== Magnetic recording ==
=== Magnetic wire recording ===
Wire recording or magnetic wire recording is an analog type of audio storage in which a magnetic recording is made on thin steel or stainless steel wire.

The wire is pulled rapidly across a recording head, which magnetizes each point along the wire in accordance with the intensity and polarity of the electrical audio signal being supplied to the recording head at that instant. By later drawing the wire across the same or a similar head while the head is not being supplied with an electrical signal, the varying magnetic field presented by the passing wire induces a similarly varying electric current in the head, recreating the original signal at a reduced level.

Magnetic wire recording was replaced by magnetic tape recording, but devices employing one or the other of these media had been more or less simultaneously under development for many years before either came into widespread use. The principles and electronics involved are nearly identical. Wire recording initially had the advantage that the recording medium itself was already fully developed, while tape recording was held back by the need to improve the materials and methods used to manufacture the tape.

Magnetic recording was demonstrated in principle as early as 1898 by Valdemar Poulsen in his telegraphone. Magnetic wire recording, and its successor, magnetic tape recording, involve the use of a magnetized medium that moves with a constant speed past a recording head. An electrical signal, which is analogous to the sound that is to be recorded, is fed to the recording head, inducing a pattern of magnetization similar to the signal. A playback head can then pick up the changes in the magnetic field from the tape and convert them into an electrical signal.

With the addition of electronic amplification developed by Curt Stille in the 1920s, the telegraphone evolved into wire recorders, which were popular for voice recording and dictation during the 1940s and into the 1950s. The reproduction quality of wire recorders was significantly lower than that achievable with phonograph disk recording technology. There were also practical difficulties, such as the tendency of the wire to become tangled or snarled. Splicing could be performed by knotting together the cut wire ends, but the results were not very satisfactory.

On Christmas Day, 1932, the British Broadcasting Corporation first used a steel tape recorder for their broadcasts. The device used was a Marconi-Stille recorder, a huge and dangerous machine which used steel tape that had sharp edges. The tape was 0.1 inches (2.5 mm) wide and 0.003 inches (0.076 mm) thick running at 5 feet per second (1.5 m/s) past the recording and reproducing heads. This meant that the length of tape required for a half-hour program was nearly 1.8 miles (2.9 km) and a full reel weighed 55 pounds (25 kg).

=== Magnetic tape sound recording ===
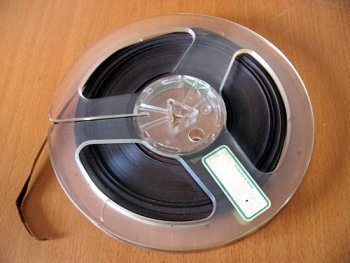
7 in (180 mm) reel of 1/4 in (6.4 mm) recording tape, typical of audiophile, consumer and educational use in the 1950s–60s

In Germany, engineers at AEG, working with the chemical giant IG Farben, created the world's first practical magnetic tape recorder, the 'K1', which was first demonstrated in 1935. During World War II, an engineer at the Reichs-Rundfunk-Gesellschaft discovered the AC biasing technique. With this technique, an inaudible high-frequency signal, typically in the range of 50 to 150 kHz, is added to the audio signal before being applied to the recording head. Biasing radically improved the sound quality of magnetic tape recordings. By 1943, AEG had developed stereo tape recorders.

During the war, the Allies became aware of radio broadcasts that seemed to be transcriptions (much of this due to the work of Richard H. Ranger), but their audio quality was indistinguishable from that of a live broadcast and their duration was far longer than was possible with 78 rpm discs. At the end of the war, the Allies captured a number of German Magnetophon recorders from Radio Luxembourg, which aroused great interest. These recorders incorporated all of the key technological features of analog magnetic recording, particularly the use of high-frequency bias.

American audio engineer John T. Mullin served in the U.S. Army Signal Corps and was posted to Paris in the final months of World War II. His unit was assigned to find out everything they could about German radio and electronics, including the investigation of claims that the Germans had been experimenting with high-energy directed radio beams as a means of disabling the electrical systems of aircraft. Mullin's unit soon amassed a collection of hundreds of low-quality magnetic dictating machines, but it was a chance visit to a studio at Bad Neuheim near Frankfurt while investigating radio beam rumors that yielded the real prize.

Mullin was given two suitcase-sized AEG 'Magnetophon' high-fidelity recorders and fifty reels of recording tape. He had them shipped home, and over the next two years, he worked on the machines constantly, modifying them and improving their performance. His major aim was to interest Hollywood studios in using magnetic tape for movie soundtrack recording.

Mullin gave two public demonstrations of his machines, and they caused a sensation among American audio professionals—many listeners could not believe that what they were hearing was not a live performance. By luck, Mullin's second demonstration was held at MGM studios in Hollywood, and in the audience that day was Bing Crosby's technical director, Murdo Mackenzie. He arranged for Mullin to meet Crosby, and in June 1947, he gave Crosby a private demonstration of his magnetic tape recorders.

Crosby was stunned by the amazing sound quality and instantly saw the huge commercial potential of the new machines. Live music was the standard for American radio at the time and the major radio networks did not permit the use of disc recording in many programs because of their comparatively poor sound quality. But Crosby disliked the regimentation of live broadcasts, preferring the relaxed atmosphere of the recording studio. He had asked NBC to let him pre-record his 1944–45 series on transcription discs, but the network refused, so Crosby had withdrawn from live radio for a year, returning for the 1946–47 season only reluctantly.

Mullin's tape recorder came along at precisely the right moment. Crosby realized that the new technology would enable him to pre-record his radio show with a sound quality that equaled live broadcasts and that these tapes could be replayed many times with no appreciable loss of quality. Mullin was asked to tape one show as a test and was immediately hired as Crosby's chief engineer to pre-record the rest of the series.

Crosby became the first major American music star to use tape to pre-record radio broadcasts and the first to master commercial recordings on tape. The taped Crosby radio shows were painstakingly edited through tape-splicing to give them a pace and flow that was wholly unprecedented in radio. Mullin even claims to have been the first to use canned laughter; at the insistence of Crosby's head writer, Bill Morrow, he inserted a segment of raucous laughter from an earlier show into a joke in a later show that had not worked well.

To use the new recorders, Crosby invested $50,000 in Ampex, which became a developer of tape recording, introducing the Ampex Model 200 tape deck in 1948, developed from Mullin's modified Magnetophones.

Development of magnetic tape recorders in the late 1940s and early 1950s is associated with the Brush Development Company and its licensee, Ampex; the equally important development of magnetic tape media itself was led by Minnesota Mining and Manufacturing corporation (now known as 3M).

=== Multitrack recording ===
The next major development in the magnetic tape was multitrack recording, in which the tape is divided into multiple tracks parallel with each other. Because they are carried on the same medium, the tracks stay in perfect synchronization. The first development in multitracking was stereo sound, which divided the recording head into two tracks. First developed by German audio engineers ca. 1943, two-track recording was rapidly adopted for modern music in the 1950s because it enabled signals from two or more microphones to be recorded separately at the same time (while the use of several microphones to record on the same track had been common since the emergence of the electrical era in the 1920s), enabling stereophonic recordings to be made and edited conveniently. (The first stereo recordings, on disks, had been made in the 1930s, but were never issued commercially.) Stereo (either true, two-microphone stereo or multi mixed) quickly became the norm for commercial classical recordings and radio broadcasts, although many pop music and jazz recordings continued to be issued in monophonic sound until the mid-1960s.

Much of the credit for the development of multitrack recording goes to guitarist, composer and technician Les Paul, who also helped design the famous electric guitar that bears his name. His experiments with tapes and recorders in the early 1950s led him to order the first custom-built eight-track recorder from Ampex, and his pioneering recordings with his then-wife, singer Mary Ford, were the first to make use of the technique of multitracking to record separate elements of a musical piece asynchronously — that is, separate elements could be recorded at different times. Paul's technique enabled him to listen to the tracks he had already taped and record new parts in time alongside them.

Multitrack recording was immediately taken up in a limited way by Ampex, who soon produced a commercial 3-track recorder. These proved extremely useful for popular music since they enabled backing music to be recorded on two tracks (either to allow the overdubbing of separate parts or to create a full stereo backing track) while the third track was reserved for the lead vocalist. Three-track recorders remained in widespread commercial use until the mid-1960s and many famous pop recordings — including many of Phil Spector's so-called Wall of Sound productions and early Motown hits — were taped on Ampex 3-track recorders. Engineer Tom Dowd was among the first to use the multitrack recording for popular music production while working for Atlantic Records during the 1950s.

The next important development was 4-track recording. The advent of this improved system gave recording engineers and musicians vastly greater flexibility for recording and overdubbing, and 4-track was the studio standard for most of the later 1960s. Many of the most famous recordings by The Beatles and The Rolling Stones were recorded on 4-track, and the engineers at London's Abbey Road Studios became particularly adept at a technique called reduction mixes in the UK and bouncing down in the United States, in which several tracks were recorded onto one 4-track machine and then mixed together and transferred (bounced down) to one track of a second 4-track machine. In this way, it was possible to record dozens of separate tracks and combine them into finished recordings of great complexity.

All of the Beatles' classic mid-1960s recordings, including the albums Revolver and Sgt. Pepper's Lonely Hearts Club Band, were recorded in this way. There were limitations, however, because of the build-up of noise during the bouncing-down process, and the Abbey Road engineers are still famed for their ability to create dense multitrack recordings while keeping background noise to a minimum.

4-track tape also enabled the development of quadraphonic sound, in which each of the four tracks was used to simulate a complete 360-degree surround sound. A number of albums were released both in stereo and quadraphonic format in the 1970s, but 'quad' failed to gain wide commercial acceptance. Although it is now considered a gimmick, it was the direct precursor of the surround sound technology that has become standard in many modern home theatre systems.

In a professional setting today, such as a studio, audio engineers may use 24 tracks or more for their recordings, using one or more tracks for each instrument played.

The combination of the ability to edit via tape splicing and the ability to record multiple tracks revolutionized studio recording. It became common studio recording practice to record on multiple tracks and bounce down afterward. The convenience of tape editing and multitrack recording led to the rapid adoption of magnetic tape as the primary technology for commercial musical recordings. Although 33 1/3 rpm and 45 rpm vinyl records were the dominant consumer format, recordings were customarily made first on tape, then transferred to disc, with Bing Crosby leading the way in the adoption of this method in the United States.

=== Further developments ===
Analog magnetic tape recording introduces noise, usually called tape hiss, caused by the finite size of the magnetic particles in the tape. There is a direct tradeoff between noise and economics. Signal-to-noise ratio is increased at higher speeds and with wider tracks, and decreased at lower speeds and with narrower tracks.

By the late 1960s, disk reproducing equipment became so good that audiophiles soon became aware that some of the noise audible on recordings was not surface noise or deficiencies in their equipment, but reproduced tape hiss. A few specialist companies started making direct to disc recordings, made by feeding microphone signals directly to a disk cutter (after amplification and mixing), in essence, reverting to the pre-War direct method of recording. These recordings never became popular, but they dramatically demonstrated the magnitude and importance of the tape hiss problem.

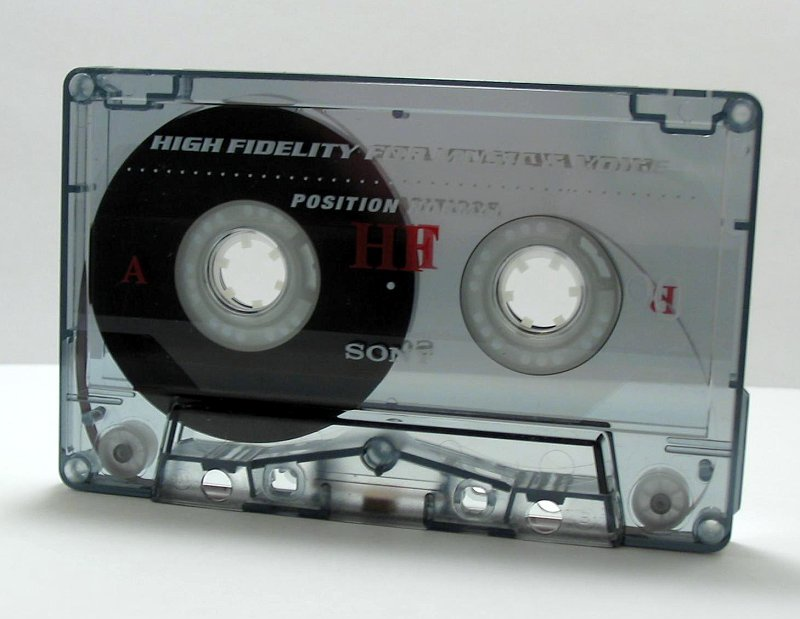
Audio cassette

Before 1963, when Philips introduced the Compact audio cassette, almost all tape recording had used the reel-to-reel format. Previous attempts to package the tape in a convenient cassette that required no threading met with limited success; the most successful was 8-track cartridge used primarily in automobiles for playback only. The Philips Compact audio cassette added much-needed convenience to the tape recording format and, a decade or so later, had begun to dominate the consumer market, although it was to remain lower in quality than open-reel formats.

In the 1970s, advances in solid-state electronics made the design and marketing of more sophisticated analog circuitry economically feasible. This led to a number of attempts to reduce tape hiss through the use of various forms of volume compression and expansion, the most notable and commercially successful being several systems developed by Dolby Laboratories. These systems divided the frequency spectrum into several bands and applied volume compression/expansion independently to each band (Engineers now often use the term compansion to refer to this process). The Dolby systems were very successful at increasing the effective dynamic range and signal-to-noise ratio of analog audio recording; to all intents and purposes, audible tape hiss could be eliminated. The original Dolby A was only used in professional recording. Successors found use in both professional and consumer formats; Dolby B became almost universal for prerecorded music on cassette. Subsequent forms, including Dolby C, (and the short-lived Dolby S) were developed for home use.

In the 1980s, digital recording methods were introduced, and analog tape recording was gradually displaced, although it has not disappeared by any means. (Many professional studios, particularly those catering to big-budget clients, use analog recorders for multitracking and/or mixdown.) The digital audio tape never became important as a consumer recording medium, partially due to legal complications arising from piracy fears on the part of the record companies. They had opposed magnetic tape recording when it first became available to consumers, but the technical difficulty of juggling recording levels, overload distortion, and residual tape hiss was sufficiently high that unlicensed reproduction of magnetic tape never became an insurmountable commercial problem. With digital methods, copies of recordings could be exact, and copyright infringement might have become a serious commercial problem. Digital tape is still used in professional situations and the DAT variant has found a home in computer data backup applications. Many professional and home recordists now use hard-disk-based systems for recording, burning the final mixes to recordable CDs.

Most Police forces in the United Kingdom (and possibly elsewhere) still use analog compact cassette systems to record Police Interviews, as they provide a medium less prone to accusations of tampering.

== Recording on film ==
The first attempts to record sound to an optical medium occurred around 1900. Prior to the use of recorded sound in film, theatres would have live orchestras present during silent films. The musicians would sit in the pit below the screen and would provide the background noise and set the mood for whatever was occurring in the movie. In 1906, Eugene Augustin Lauste applied for a patent to record Sound-on-film, but was ahead of his time. In 1923, Lee de Forest applied for a patent to record to film; he also made a number of short experimental films, mostly of vaudeville performers. William Fox began releasing sound-on-film newsreels in 1926, the same year that Warner Bros. released Don Juan with music and sound effects recorded on discs, as well as a series of short films with fully-synchronized sound on discs. In 1927, the sound film The Jazz Singer was released; while not the first sound film, it made a tremendous hit and made the public and the film industry realize that sound film was more than a mere novelty.

The Jazz Singer used a process called Vitaphone that involved synchronizing the projected film to sound recorded on a disc. It essentially amounted to playing a phonograph record, but one that was recorded with the best electrical technology of the time. Audiences used to acoustic phonographs and recordings would, in the theatre, have heard something resembling 1950s high fidelity.

However, in the days of analog technology, no process involving a separate disk could hold synchronization precisely or reliably. Vitaphone was quickly supplanted by technologies that recorded an optical soundtrack directly onto the side of the strip of motion picture film. This was the dominant technology from the 1930s through the 1960s and is still in use as of 2013 although the analog soundtrack is being replaced by digital sound on film formats.

There are two types of synchronized film soundtrack: optical and magnetic. Optical soundtracks are visual renditions of sound wave forms and provide sound through a light beam and optical sensor within the projector. Magnetic soundtracks are essentially the same as used in conventional analog tape recording.

Magnetic soundtracks can be joined with the moving image, but they create an abrupt discontinuity because of the offset of the audio track relative to the picture. Whether optical or magnetic, the audio pickup must be located several inches ahead of the projection lamp, shutter and drive sprockets. There is usually a flywheel as well to smooth out the film moves to eliminate the flutter that would otherwise result from the negative pulldown mechanism.

A variable density soundtrack (left) and a bi-lateral variable area soundtrack (right)

For optical recording on film, there are two methods utilized. Variable density recording uses changes in the darkness of the soundtrack side of the film to represent the sound wave. Variable area recording uses changes in the width of a dark strip to represent the sound wave.

In both cases, a light that is sent through the part of the film that corresponds to the soundtrack changes in intensity, proportional to the original sound, and that light is not projected on the screen but converted into an electrical signal by a light-sensitive device.

Optical soundtracks are prone to the same sorts of degradation that affect the picture, such as scratching and copying.

Unlike the film image that creates the illusion of continuity, soundtracks are continuous. This means that if film with a combined soundtrack is cut and spliced, the image will cut cleanly but the soundtrack will most likely produce a cracking sound. Fingerprints on the film may also produce cracking or interference.

In the late 1950s, the cinema industry, desperate to provide a theatre experience that would be overwhelmingly superior to television, introduced widescreen processes such as Cinerama, Todd-AO and CinemaScope. These processes at the same time introduced technical improvements in sound, generally involving the use of multitrack magnetic sound, recorded on an oxide stripe laminated onto the film. In subsequent decades, a gradual evolution occurred with more and more theatres installing various forms of magnetic-sound equipment.

In the 1990s, digital audio systems were introduced and began to prevail. In some of them, the sound recording is again recorded on a separate disk, as in Vitaphone; others use a digital optical sound track on the film itself. Digital processes can now achieve reliable and perfect synchronization.

== Digital recording ==
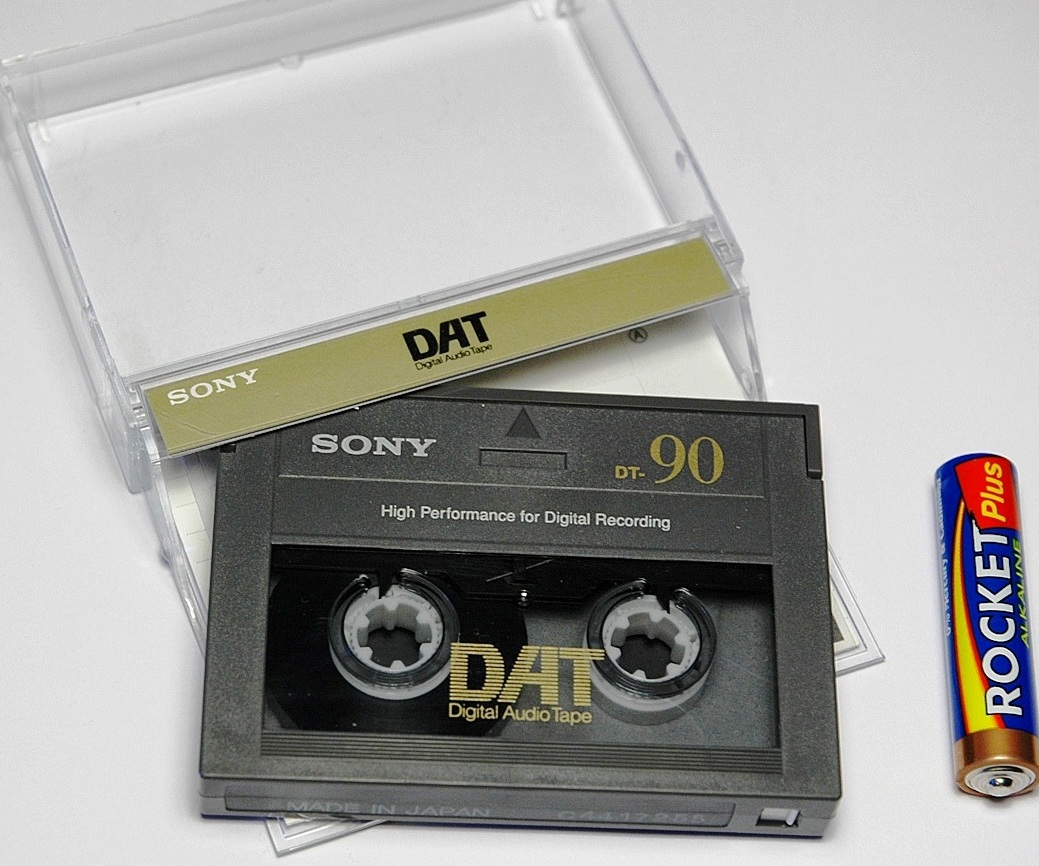
The Digital Audio Tape (DAT)

The first digital audio recorders were reel-to-reel decks introduced by companies such as Denon (1972), Soundstream (1979) and Mitsubishi. They used a digital technology known as PCM recording. Within a few years, however, many studios were using devices that encoded the digital audio data into a standard video signal, which was then recorded on a U-matic or other videotape recorder, using the rotating-head technology that was standard for video. A similar technology was used for a consumer format, known as Digital Audio Tape (DAT), which used rotating heads on a narrow tape contained in a cassette. DAT records at sampling rates of 48 kHz or 44.1 kHz, the latter being the same rate used on compact discs. Bit depth is 16 bits, also the same as compact discs. DAT was a failure in the consumer-audio field (too expensive, too finicky, and crippled by anti-copying regulations), but it became popular in studios (particularly home studios) and radio stations. A failed digital tape recording system was the Digital Compact Cassette (DCC).

Within a few years after the introduction of digital recording, multitrack recorders (using stationary heads) were being produced for use in professional studios. In the early 1990s, relatively affordable multitrack digital recorders were introduced for use in home studios; they returned to recording on videotape. The most notable of this type of recorder is the ADAT. Developed by Alesis and first released in 1991, the ADAT machine is capable of recording 8 tracks of digital audio onto a single S-VHS video cassette. The ADAT machine, followed by the Tascam equivalent, the DA-88, using a smaller Hi-8 video cassette, was a common fixture in professional and home studios around the world until approximately 2000 when it was supplanted by the modern-day audio interface, digital audio workstations and recording into hard drives (as well as solid state drives, eventually).

In the consumer market, tapes and gramophones were largely displaced by the compact disc (CD) and a lesser extent the minidisc. These recording media are fully digital and require complex electronics to play back. Digital recording has progressed towards higher fidelity, with formats such as DVD-A offering sampling rates of up to 192 kHz.

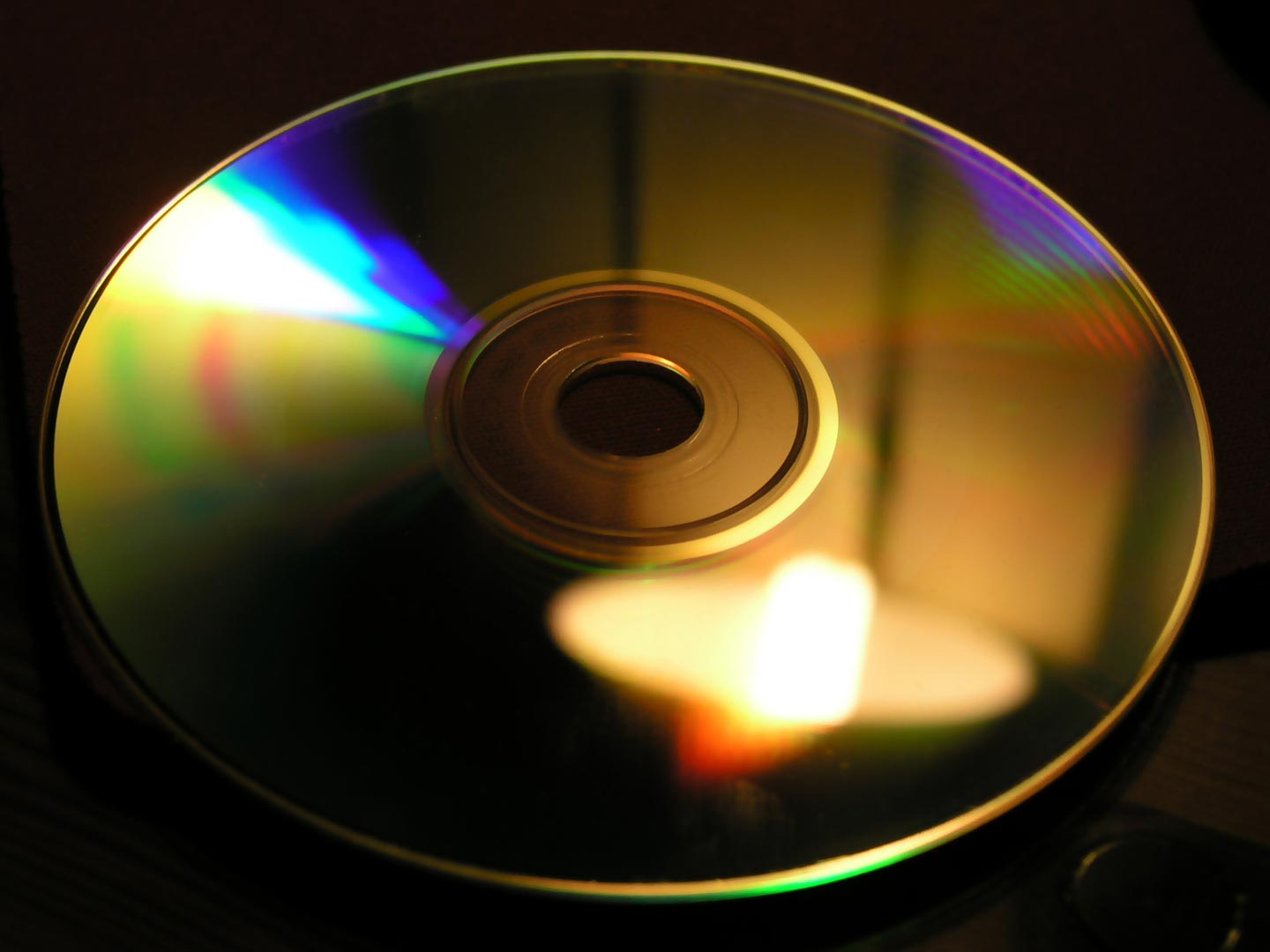
Interference colours on a compact disc

Digital sound files can be stored on any computer storage medium. The development of the MP3 audio file format, and legal issues involved in copying such files, has driven most of the innovation in music distribution since their introduction in the late 1990s.

As hard disk capacities and computer CPU speeds increased at the end of the 1990s, hard disk recording became more popular. As of early 2005, hard disk recording takes two forms. One is the use of standard desktop or laptop computers, with adapters for encoding audio into two or many tracks of digital audio. These adapters can either be in-the-box soundcards or external devices, either connecting to in-box interface cards or connecting to the computer via USB or Firewire cables. The other common form of hard disk recording uses a dedicated recorder that contains analog-to-digital and digital-to-analog converters as well as one or two removable hard drives for data storage. Such recorders, packing 24 tracks in a few units of rack space, are actually single-purpose computers, which can in turn be connected to standard computers for editing.

== The revival of vinyl ==
The vinyl revival is the return to popularity of vinyl records, or long-playing (LP) records, as a way to consume music despite the rise of digital media. Over 15 thousand units were sold between 2008 and 2012, their sales reaching the highest level in 2012 since 1993. Popular artists have begun releasing their albums on vinyl, and stores such as Urban Outfitters and Whole Foods Market have started selling them. Popular music corporations, such as Sony, have started manufacturing LP for the first time since 1989 as this medium becomes more popular. However, some companies are facing production problems as there are only 16 record plants currently functioning in the United States.

== Technique ==
The analog tape recorder made it possible to erase or record over a previous recording so that mistakes could be fixed. Another advantage of recording on tape is the ability to cut the tape and join it back together. This allows the recording to be edited. Pieces of the recording can be removed or rearranged. See also audio editing, audio mixing, multitrack recording.

The advent of electronic instruments (especially keyboards and synthesizers), effects and other instruments has led to the importance of MIDI in recording. For example, using MIDI timecode, it is possible to have different equipment 'trigger' without direct human intervention at the time of recording.

In more recent times, computers (digital audio workstations) have found an increasing role in the recording studio, as their use eases the tasks of cutting and looping, as well as allowing for instantaneous changes, such as duplication of parts, the addition of effects and the rearranging of parts of the recording.

== See also ==
- Binaural recording
- Bootleg recording
- High fidelity
- Microphone technique
- Timeline of audio formats
- Volta Laboratory-Sound recording
- Encyclopedia of Recorded Sound (2 Vols.) (2nd ed.). Routledge. 2005 [1993].
