= Phonautograph =

Earliest known device for recording sound

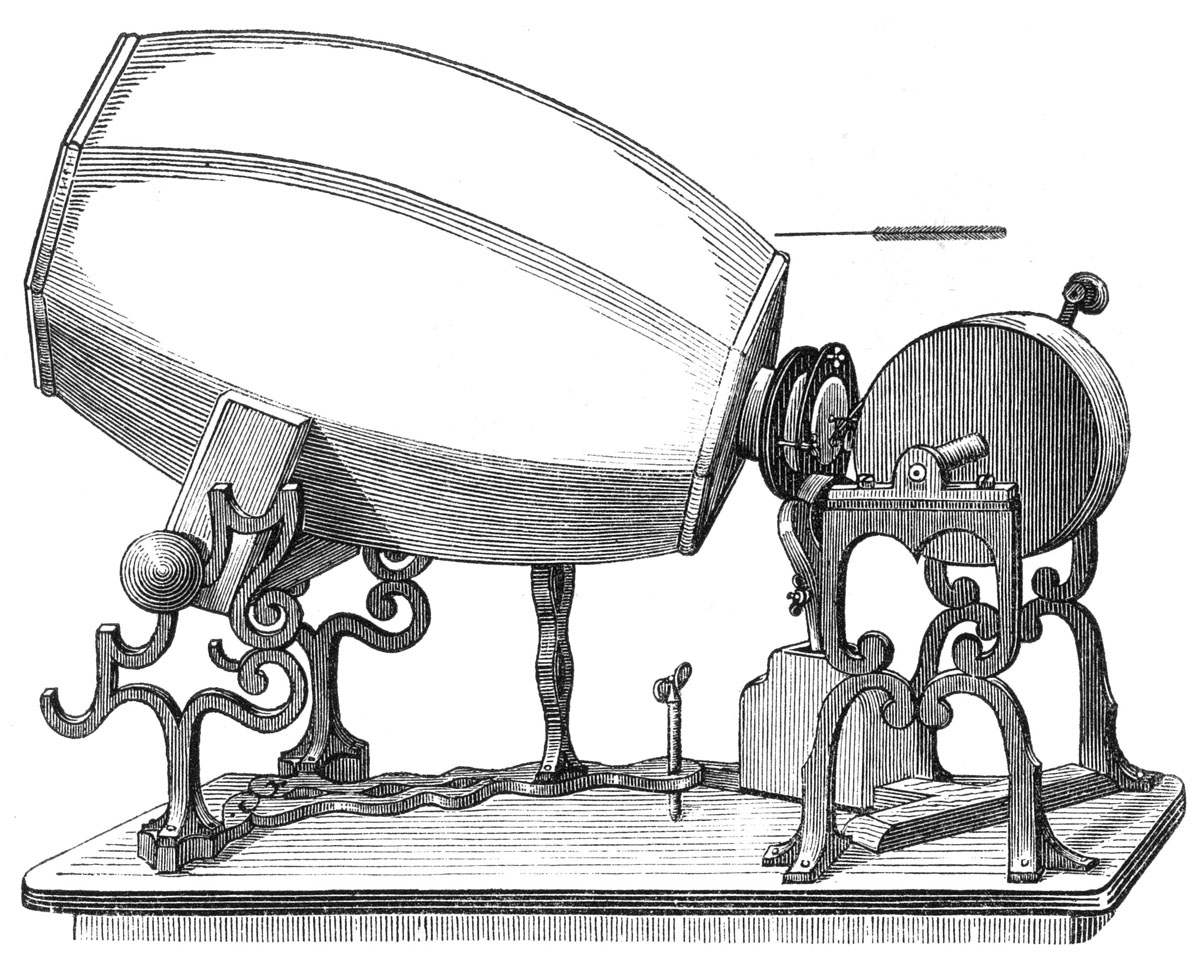
An early phonautograph (1859). The inner walls of the barrel, for receiving sound, are made of plaster of Paris.

Au clair de la lune
This 1860 phonautogram by Édouard-Léon Scott de Martinville is the oldest known intelligible recording of the human voice. Played at what is now believed to be the correct speed, it reveals a man's voice, presumably Scott de Martinville's, singing very slowly. The words are "Au clair de la lune, mon ami Pierrot, prête-m—".

The phonautograph is the earliest known device for recording sound. Previously, tracings had been obtained of the sound-producing vibratory motions of tuning forks and other objects by physical contact with them, but not of actual sound waves as they propagated through air or other media. Invented by Frenchman Édouard-Léon Scott de Martinville, it was patented on March 25, 1857. It transcribed sound waves as undulations or other deviations in a line traced on smoke-blackened paper or glass. Scott believed that future technology would allow the traces to be deciphered as a kind of "natural stenography". Intended as a laboratory instrument for the study of acoustics, it was used to visually study and measure the amplitude envelopes and waveforms of speech and other sounds or to determine the frequency of a given musical pitch by comparison with a simultaneously recorded reference frequency.

It did not occur to anyone before the 1870s that the recordings, called phonautograms, contained enough information about the sound that they could be used to recreate it. Because the phonautogram tracing was an insubstantial two-dimensional line, direct physical playback was impossible in any case. However, several phonautograms recorded before 1861 were successfully converted and played as sound in 2008 by optically scanning them and using a computer to process the scans into digital audio files.

== Construction ==
Detail of a phonautogram made in 1859

The phonautograph was patented on March 25, 1857, by Frenchman Édouard-Léon Scott de Martinville, an editor and typographer of manuscripts at a scientific publishing house in Paris. One day while editing Professor Longet's Traité de Physiologie, he happened upon that customer's engraved illustration of the anatomy of the human ear and conceived of "the imprudent idea of photographing the word". In 1853 or 1854 (Scott cited both years), he began working on "le problème de la parole s'écrivant elle-même" ('the problem of speech writing itself'), aiming to build a device that could replicate the function of the human ear.

Scott coated a plate of glass with a thin layer of lampblack. He then took an acoustic trumpet, and at its tapered end affixed a thin membrane that served as the analog to the eardrum. At the center of that membrane, he attached a rigid boar's bristle approximately a centimeter long, placed so that it just grazed the lampblack. As the glass plate was slid horizontally in a well-formed groove at a speed of one meter per second, a person would speak into the trumpet, causing the membrane to vibrate and the stylus to trace figures that were scratched into the lampblack. On March 25, 1857, Scott received the French patent #17,897/31,470 for his device, which he called a phonautograph. The earliest known intelligible recorded sound of a human voice was conducted on April 9, 1860 when Scott recorded someone singing the song "Au Clair de la Lune" ("By the Light of the Moon") on the device. However, the device was not designed to play back sounds, as Scott intended for people to read back the tracings, which he called phonautograms. This was not the first time someone had used a device to create direct tracings of the vibrations of sound-producing objects, as tuning forks had been used in this way by English physicist Thomas Young in 1807. By late 1857, with support from the Société d'encouragement pour l'industrie nationale, Scott’s phonautograph was recording sounds with sufficient precision to be adopted by the scientific community, paving the way for the nascent science of acoustics.

The device's true significance in the history of recorded sound was not fully realized prior to March 2008, when it was discovered and resurrected in a Paris patent office by First Sounds, an informal collaborative of American audio historians, recording engineers, and sound archivists founded to make the earliest sound recordings available to the public. The phonautograms were then digitally converted by scientists at the Lawrence Berkeley National Laboratory in California, who were able to play back the recorded sounds, something Scott had never conceived of. Prior to this point, the earliest known record of a human voice was thought to be an 1877 phonograph recording by Thomas Edison. The phonautograph would play a role in the development of the gramophone, whose inventor, Emile Berliner, worked with the phonautograph in the course of developing his own device.

== Invention and technical design ==
Scott's phonautograph of 1857 was designed to visually capture sound waves. It used a horn to funnel sound toward a thin membrane, similar to a drumhead. Attached to the membrane was a stylus that scratched the vibrations onto a surface coated with soot, such as smoked paper or glass. As sound entered the horn, the stylus moved in response, producing a wavy line that represented the sound's vibrations. These visual traces, known as phonautograms, were studied for scientific purposes, helping researchers observe the physical properties of sound, such as frequency and amplitude. The device was not intended to reproduce sound but instead to allow for the analysis of its patterns.

== Preservation of recordings ==
During his time working with the phonautograph (1857-1861), Scott would begin archiving and preserving his work through various means. His early works with the phonautograph were archived with the Académie Des Sciences, with his work being sealed in an envelope and processed through the pli cacheté system with proof of his work.

On March 25, 1857, with funding from the Société d'encouragement Pour l'industrie nationale (SEIN), Scott would also file for a patent, allowing credit to be given to him for innovating "A process by means of which one can write and draw by sound . . . and make industrial uses thereof." Alongside this patent, Scott submitted drawings and actual phonautograms he had recorded. However, since the sound traces of the phonautograms were made of soot traces and not ink, as the law required, only his drawings appeared in the official patent. Even so, Scott successfully cemented his idea and innovation into the French archives through patenting.

== Rediscovery ==
In 2008, a team of researchers known as the First Sounds Project successfully played back Scott de Martinville's phonautograms for the first time. Using high-resolution optical scanning and digital analysis, they were able to convert the soot tracings into audible sound without damaging the original artifacts. Among the recordings was a brief excerpt of "Au Clair de la Lune", dating from 1860, which became the earliest known intelligible recording of a human voice. This breakthrough revealed that Scott had captured sound nearly two decades before Thomas Edison's invention of the phonograph, prompting a reevaluation of the early history of sound recording.

== Legacy and influence ==
Although the phonautograph was not capable of sound playback and was originally conceived as a tool for studying acoustics, its invention laid essential groundwork for the development of sound recording technologies. Scott de Martinville's conceptual leap—the idea that sound could be captured and visually inscribed—prefigured the audio revolution that would follow decades later.

When Thomas Edison introduced the phonograph in 1877, he was likely unaware of Scott's earlier work. Unlike the phonautograph, Edison's device could both record and reproduce sound, making it commercially viable and historically celebrated. However, Scott's phonautograph represented a key conceptual milestone: the translation of sound waves into a physical medium.

Scott's contributions remained largely unknown outside of niche academic circles until the early 21st century. The recovery and playback of the phonautograms by the First Sounds Project spurred renewed interest in Scott's work and emphasized his underappreciated role in the history of sound recording. Historians and scholars now recognize the phonautograph as a pioneering invention that bridged the gap between scientific study and artistic expression and as a precursor to the modern audio industry. As technology continues to evolve, Scott's vision of capturing sound in a tangible form remains foundational.

== Scott's critiques on the phonautograph's successor ==
Seventeen years after he first introduced the phonautograph, Scott would return to his work following Edison's introduction of the phonograph in the form of a short book titled Le Problème de la parole s’écrivant elle-même: la France, l’Amérique... in which he details documentation citing the French innovation as the predecessor and inspiration to Edison's.

Additionally, Scott expressed skepticism about Edison's new invention and its capabilities at the time, particularly its ability to record and play back orchestral music, which he deemed unfeasible for the model and time.

== Playback ==
By mid-April 1877, Charles Cros had realized that a phonautogram could be converted back into sound by photoengraving the tracing into a metal surface to create a playable groove, then using a stylus and diaphragm similar to those of the phonautograph to reverse the recording process and recreate the sound. Before he was able to put his ideas into practice, the announcement of Thomas Edison's phonograph, which recorded sound waves by indenting them into a sheet of tinfoil from which they could be played back immediately, temporarily relegated Cros's less direct method to obscurity.

Ten years later, the early experiments of Emile Berliner, the creator of the disc gramophone, employed a recording machine that was in essence a disc form of the phonautograph. It traced a clear sound-modulated spiral line through a thin black coating on a glass disc. The photoengraving method first proposed by Cros was then used to produce a metal disc with a playable groove. Arguably, these circa 1887 experiments by Berliner were the first known reproductions of sound from phonautograph recordings.

However, as far as is known, no attempt was ever made to use this method to play any of the surviving early phonautograms made by Scott de Martinville. Possibly this was because the few images of them generally available in books and periodicals were of unpromising short bursts of sound, of fragmentary areas of longer recordings, or simply too crude and indistinct to encourage such an experiment.

Nearly 150 years after they had been recorded, promising specimens of Scott de Martinville's phonautograms, stored among his papers in France's patent office and at the Académie des Sciences, were located by American audio historians. High-quality images of them were obtained. In 2008, the team played back the recordings as sound for the first time. Modern computer-based image processing methods were used to accomplish the playback. The first results were obtained by using a specialized system developed for optically playing recordings on more conventional media which were too fragile or damaged to be played by traditional means. Later, generally available image-editing and image-to-sound conversion software, requiring only a high-quality scan of the phonautogram and an ordinary personal computer, were found to be sufficient for this application.

For First Sounds' March 2008 release of "Au Clair de la Lune", its engineers wrote software to improve the stability of the sound. It did the same with a May 17, 1860 recording of "Gamme de la Voix", which First Sounds presented at the Audie Engineering Society's convention in late 2008.

== Recovered sounds ==
One phonautogram, created on April 9, 1860, was revealed to be a 20-second recording of the French folk song "Au clair de la lune". It was initially played at double the original recording speed and believed to be the voice of a woman or child. However, further recordings were uncovered, accompanied by notes Scott de Martinville made that inadvertently identified himself as the speaker. At the correct speed, the voice of a man, almost certainly Scott de Martinville himself, is heard singing the song very slowly. Also recovered were two 1860 recordings of "Vole, petite abeille" ("Fly, Little Bee"), a lively song from a comic opera. Previously, the earliest known recording of vocal music was an 1888 Edison wax cylinder phonograph recording of a Handel choral concert.

A phonautogram containing the opening lines of Torquato Tasso's pastoral drama Aminta has also been found. Probably recorded in April or May 1860, this phonautogram is the earliest known recording of intelligible spoken words to be played back, predating Frank Lambert's 1878 talking clock recording. Earlier recordings, made in 1857, 1854, and 1853, also contain Scott de Martinville's voice but are unintelligible because of their low quality, brevity, and irregularity of speed. Only one of these recordings, the 1857 cornet scale recording, was restored and made intelligible.

== See also ==
- History of sound recording
- Au clair de la lune recording
