= The City of London Phonograph and Gramophone Society =

British society and registered charity

The City of London Phonograph and Gramophone Society (CLPGS) (Note: In the United Kingdom, the term 'phonograph' is used for a player of cylinders, while a 'gramophone' plays disc records. In many other parts of the world the term 'phonograph' is used for both.) is a British society and registered charity dedicated to the research in all aspects of early recorded sound. Founded in 1919, the CLPGS is likely to be the oldest society of its type in the world.

== History ==
The CLPGS was founded under the name The London Edison Society in 1919, when Norman Hillyer and some members of the North London Phonograph and Gramophone Society decided that a group was needed within the City of London. The founding members agreed to approach Thomas Edison to ask if he would become a Patron of the new venture. Edison would only agree if the group changed its name to the City of London Phonograph Society, so this was done. The group's initial membership numbered about forty.

In the 1920s, with the shift away from phonograph cylinders, the group changed its name to The City of London Phonograph and Radio Society, reflecting many of the members' interests in early radio technology.

Meetings of the society have continued since these early beginnings, interrupted by World War II and the COVID-19 pandemic, but resumed afterwards. The society has met at various locations in London throughout its history, with meetings presently held at Conway Hall, in the London Borough of Camden (rather than the City of London itself). Regular meetings are also held in the UK regions. Despite its historic name, the Society has members worldwide, although the majority of them are located in the UK.

By the late 1940s, interest in radios as a hobby had waned, and the group renamed themselves with their present name to reflect their interest in gramophones and early recorded sound technology in general. One of the society's current patrons is Oliver Berliner, grandson of the recording pioneer Emile Berliner; a former patron was the late Simon Blumlein (11 May 1936 – 2 January 2024), son of Alan Blumlein, who invented stereo recording. The CLPGS is now the oldest society of its kind in the world.

== Publications ==
Since 1963, the society has published its quarterly magazine, initially named The Hillandale News, and (since 2002) called For the Record. These authoritative, quality publications have been a significant vehicle for research on early talking machines and recordings.

Since 2010 the society has also published a growing list of Reference Series titles, a series of A5-sized books, designed to provide an accessible library of relevant historical information, in both text and audio form. New titles are produced regularly; they now form an extensive body of information for those interested in early talking machines and recordings. More details are on the CLPGS website. The society has published a number of discographies for British record labels, such as Columbia and Decca. In addition, there are various other discography books available.
