= Au clair de la lune =

French folk song

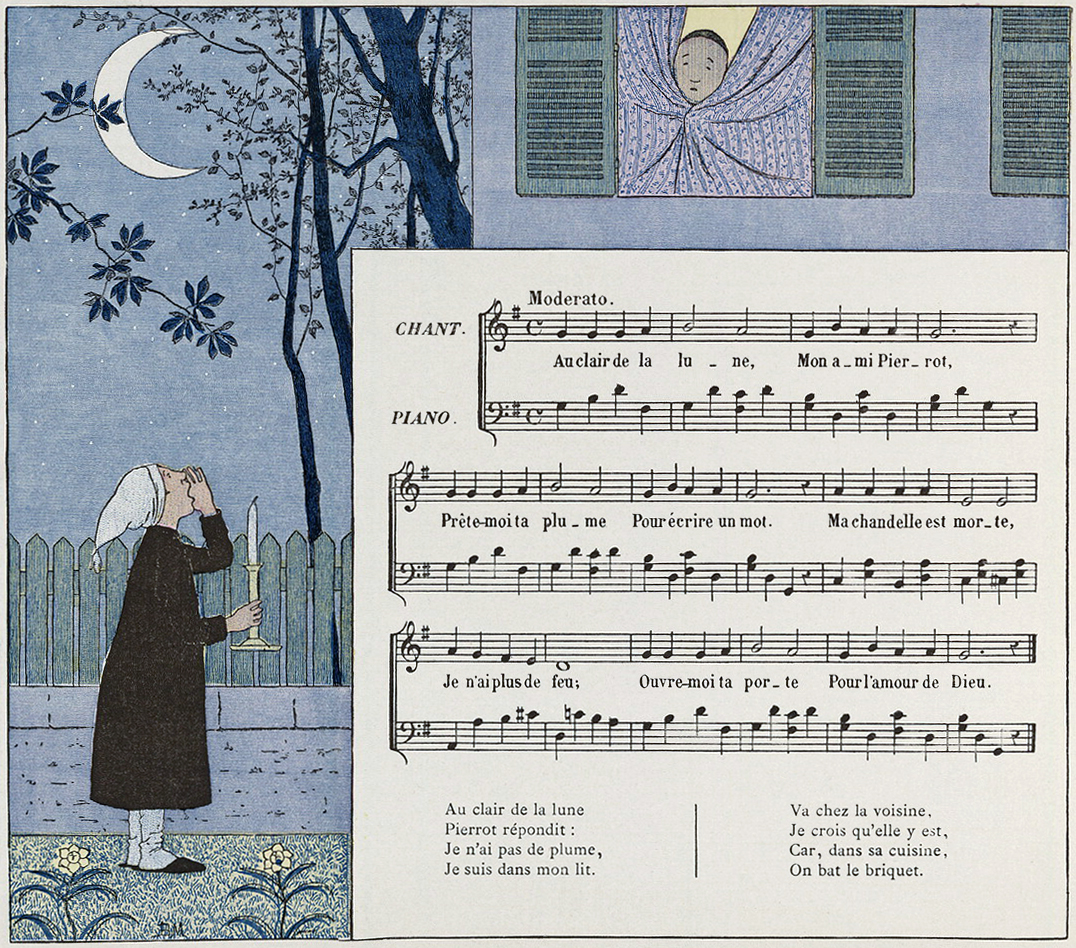
"Au clair de la lune" from a children's book, c. 1910–1919. MIDI rendition

"Au clair de la lune" (French pronunciation: [o klɛʁ də la lyn(ə)], lit. 'By the Light of the Moon') is a French folk song of the 18th century. Its composer and lyricist are unknown. Its simple melody is commonly taught to beginners learning an instrument. In the history of sound recording, it has the distinction of being the first ever recorded music (1860).

== Lyrics ==
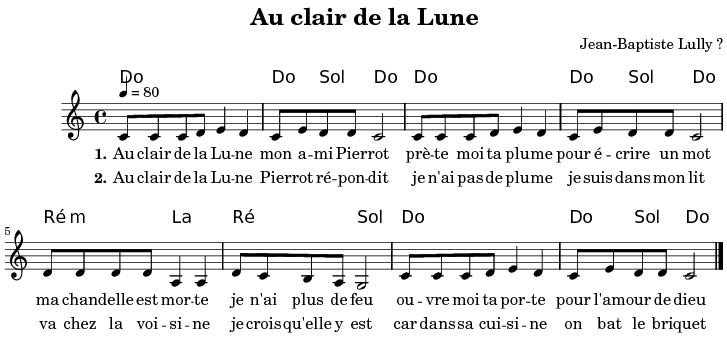
Chords, melody and words MIDI rendition

The song appears as early as 1820 in Les Voitures Verseés, with only the first verse. Four verses were later re-published in the 1858 compilation Chants et Chansons populaires de la France.

In the 1870 compilation Chansons et Rondes Enfantines, only the first two verses of the original four were retained.

"Au clair de la lune,
Mon ami Pierrot,
Prête-moi ta plume
Pour écrire un mot.
Ma chandelle est morte,
Je n'ai plus de feu.
Ouvre-moi ta porte
Pour l'amour de Dieu."

Au clair de la lune,
Pierrot répondit :
"Je n'ai pas de plume,
Je suis dans mon lit.
Va chez la voisine,
Je crois qu'elle y est,
Car dans sa cuisine
On bat le briquet."

Au clair de la lune,
L'aimable Lubin;
Frappe chez la brune,
Elle répond soudain :
–Qui frappe de la sorte?
Il dit à son tour :
–Ouvrez votre porte,
Pour le Dieu d'Amour.

Au clair de la lune,
On n'y voit qu'un peu.
On chercha la plume,
On chercha du feu.
En cherchant d'la sorte,
Je n'sais c'qu'on trouva;
Mais je sais qu'la porte
Sur eux se ferma."

"By the light of the moon,
My friend Pierrot,
Lend me your quill
To write a word.
My candle is dead,
I have no light left.
Open your door for me
For the love of God."

By the light of the moon,
Pierrot replied:
"I don't have any quill,
I am in my bed
Go to the neighbor's,
I think she's there
Because in her kitchen
Someone is lighting the fire."

By the light of the moon
Likeable Lubin
Knocks on the brunette's door.
She suddenly responds:
– Who's knocking like that?
He then replies:
– Open your door
for the God of Love!

By the light of the moon
One could barely see.
The pen was looked for,
The light was looked for.
With all that looking
I don't know what was found,
But I do know that the door
Shut itself on them.

Some sources report that "plume" (pen) was originally "lume" (an old word for "light" or "lamp"), which makes more sense of the song’s contextual framework. Much of the lyrics have sexual innuendos.

== In music ==
French composer Ferdinand Hérold wrote a set of variations for piano solo in E-flat major (1820).

Muzio Clementi's Op 48 (1821) is a fantasia on the tune.

Au clair de la lune
1860 phonautogram by Édouard-Léon Scott de Martinville is the oldest recognizable recording of the human voice, presumably that of its creator.

On 9 April 1860, Édouard-Léon Scott de Martinville recorded himself singing the beginning of "Au clair de la lune" on a phonautograph, making it the earliest recognizable record of the human voice and the earliest recognizable record of music. In 2008, the recording was digitally converted to sound by researchers at the Lawrence Berkeley National Laboratory.

The American-born Brazilian/French composer Charles-Lucien Lambert wrote a set of variations on the tune (ca 1860)

Claude Debussy, composer of the similarly named "Clair de lune" from his Suite bergamasque, uses "Au clair de la lune" as the basis of his song "Pierrot" (Pantomime, L. 31) (1882) from Quatre Chansons de Jeunesse.

19th-century French composer Camille Saint-Saëns quoted the first few notes of the tune in the section "The Fossils", part of his suite The Carnival of the Animals (1886)

A set of variations on the tune appears in Boieldieu's opera Les voitures versees (1908)

Erik Satie quoted this song in the section "Le flirt" (No. 19) of his 1914 piano collection Sports et divertissements.

In 1926, Samuel Barber rewrote "H-35: Au Claire de la Lune: A Modern Setting of an old folk tune" while studying at the Curtis Institute of Music.

In 1928, Marc Blitzstein orchestrated "Variations sur 'Au Claire de la Lune'."

In 1955, Swiss composer Frank Martin wrote a setting of Au clair de la lune for one of his children to practice octaves (Primo part). It consists of three variations provided by the Secondo part.

In 1964, French pop singer France Gall recorded a version of this song, with altered lyrics to make it a love song.

In 2008, composer Fred Momotenko composed an eponymous tribute score for 4-part vocal ensemble and surround audio.

== In visual art ==
In the 1804 painting and sculpting exposition, Pierre-Auguste Vafflard presented a painting depicting Edward Young burying his daughter by night. An anonymous critic commented on the monochromatic nature of that painting with the lyrics:

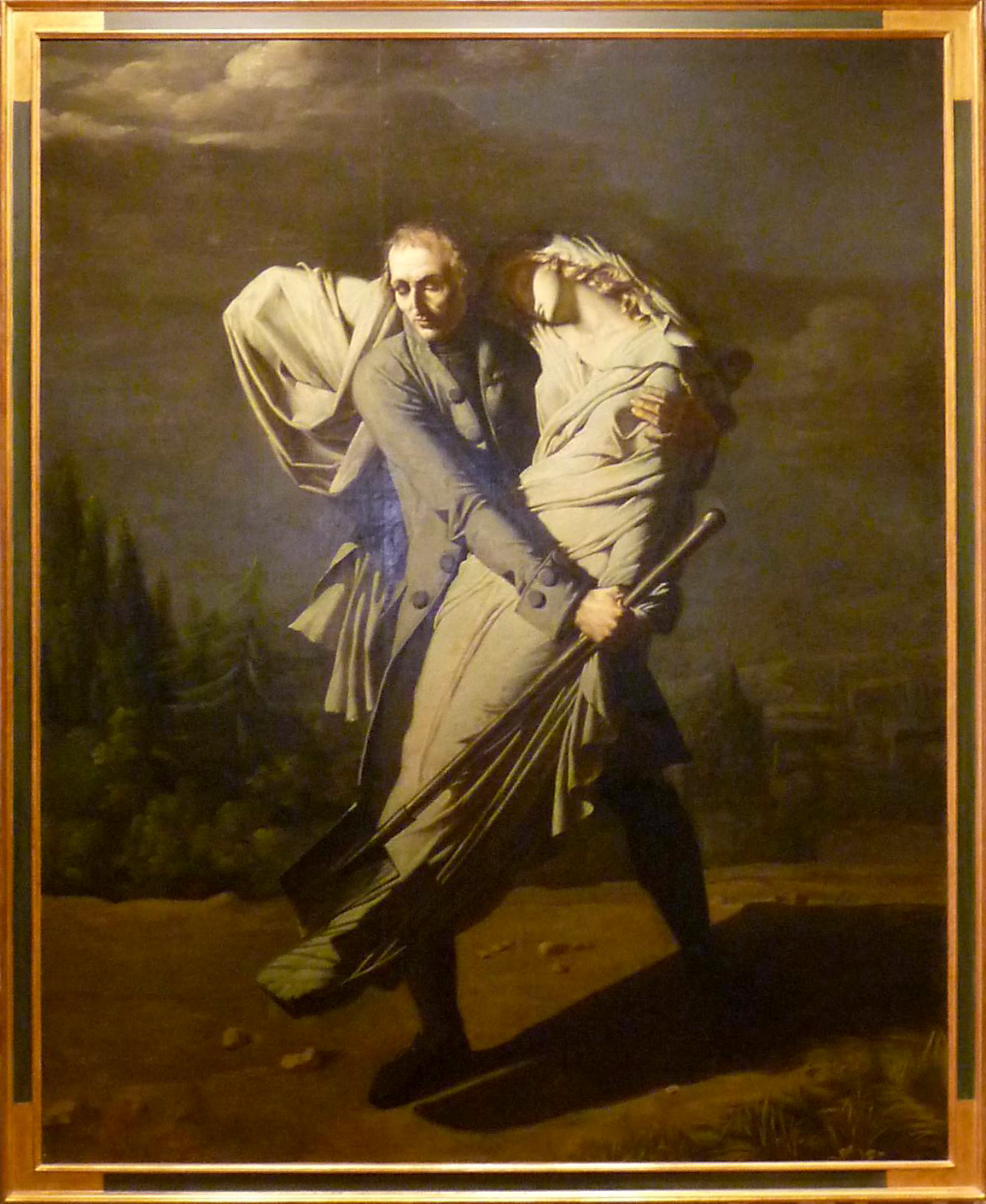
Young et sa fille by Pierre-Auguste Vafflard (1804)

Au clair de la lune
Les objets sont bleus
Plaignons l'infortune
De ce malheureux
Las ! sa fille est morte
Ce n'est pas un jeu
Ouvrez-lui la porte
Pour l'amour de Dieu.

By the light of the moon
All things are blue
Cry for the misfortune
Of this poor soul
Sadly! His daughter is dead
It is no game
Open the door to her
For the love of God.

== In literature ==
The "Story of my Friend Peterkin and the Moon" in The Ladies Pocket Magazine (1835) mentions the song several times and ends:

Indeed, what must have been the chagrin and despair of this same Jaurat, when he heard sung every night by all the little boys of Paris, that song of "Au clair de la lune", every verse of which was a remembrance of happiness to Cresson, and a reproach of cruelty to friend Peterkin, who would not open his door to his neighbor, when he requested this slight service.

In his 1952 memoir Witness, Whittaker Chambers reminisced:

In my earliest recollections of her, my mother is sitting in the lamplight, in a Windsor rocking chair, in front of the parlor stove. She is holding my brother on her lap. It is bed time and, in a thin sweet voice, she is singing him into drowsiness. I am on the floor, as usual among the chair legs, and I crawl behind my mother's chair because I do not like the song she is singing and do not want her to see what it does to me. She sings: "Au clair de la lune; Mon ami, Pierrot; Prête-moi ta plume; Pour écrire un mot."

Then the vowels darken ominously. My mother's voice deepens dramatically, as if she were singing in a theater. This was the part of the song I disliked most, not only because I knew that it was sad, but because my mother was deliberately (and rather unfairly, I thought) making it sadder: "Ma chandelle est morte; Je n'ai plus de feu; Ouvre-moi la porte; Pour l'amour de Dieu."

I knew, from an earlier explanation, that the song was about somebody (a little girl, I thought) who was cold because her candle and fire had gone out. She went to somebody else (a little boy, I thought) and asked him to help her for God's sake. He said no. It seemed a perfectly pointless cruelty to me.

In their 1957 play Bad Seed: A Play in Two Acts, Maxwell Anderson and William March write: "A few days later, in the same apartment. The living-room is empty: Rhoda can be seen practicing 'Au Clair de la Lune' on the piano in the den." In F. Scott Fitzgerald's novel Tender is the Night, Dick and Nicole Diver's children sing the first verse at the request of the film producer Earl Brady.

The song is featured in the story "For the God of Love, For the Love of God" in Lauren Groff's 2018 collection Florida, and the story takes its title from the lyrics.

== See also ==
- Au clair de la lune recording — The first audio recording discovered
