= Pierre-Auguste Vafflard =

French painter

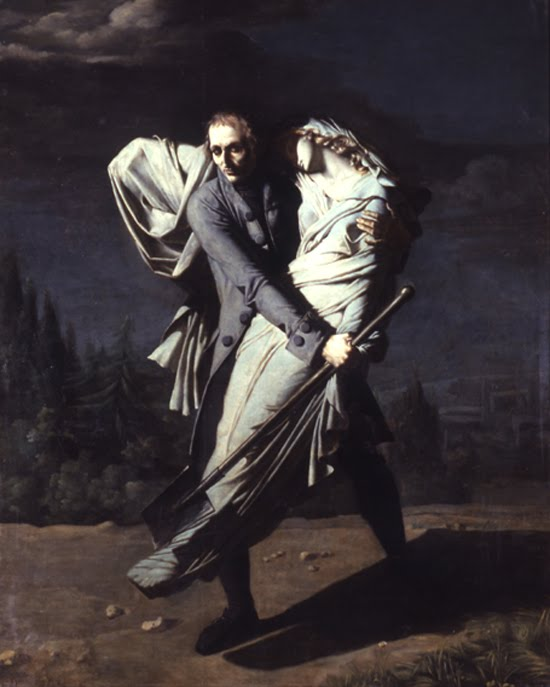
Young and His Daughter (1804)

Pierre Antoine Augustin Vafflard (19 December 1777 – 7 September 1837) was a French painter who specialized in history, genre scenes and portraits. His later paintings are in the Troubadour style.

== Life and work ==
Vafflard was born in Paris. He was a student of Jean-Baptiste Regnault.

He exhibited at the Salon beginning in 1800 and won the Gold Medal at the Salon of 1824 for "Dernière bénédiction de l'évêque Bourlier" (The last blessing of Bishop Bourlier). Under the July Monarchy, he was responsible for pictorial restorative work at the galleries in the Château de Versailles and the "Galerie de Diane" at the palais des Tuileries. He also did church decorations. In 1834, he was a major exhibitor at the "Exposition d'objets d'arts et d'industrie anciens et modernes" in Bordeaux, from which all profits were distributed to the poor. He died in Paris in 1837.

Vafflard's works are in museums throughout France as well as the Metropolitan Museum of Art in New York.

One of his most often reproduced images is Young et sa fille, exhibited at the Salon of 1804 and currently in the Musée d'Angoulême. It depicts the English poet, Edward Young carrying the body of his daughter-in-law, Elizabeth Temple, to bury her in the Swiss Protestant cemetery after it had been refused at the Catholic cemetery. Vafflard changed it to the poet's daughter, to make it more dramatic. It has been used as a cover illustration for The Lady of the Shroud by Bram Stoker and Frankenstein.

== Gallery ==
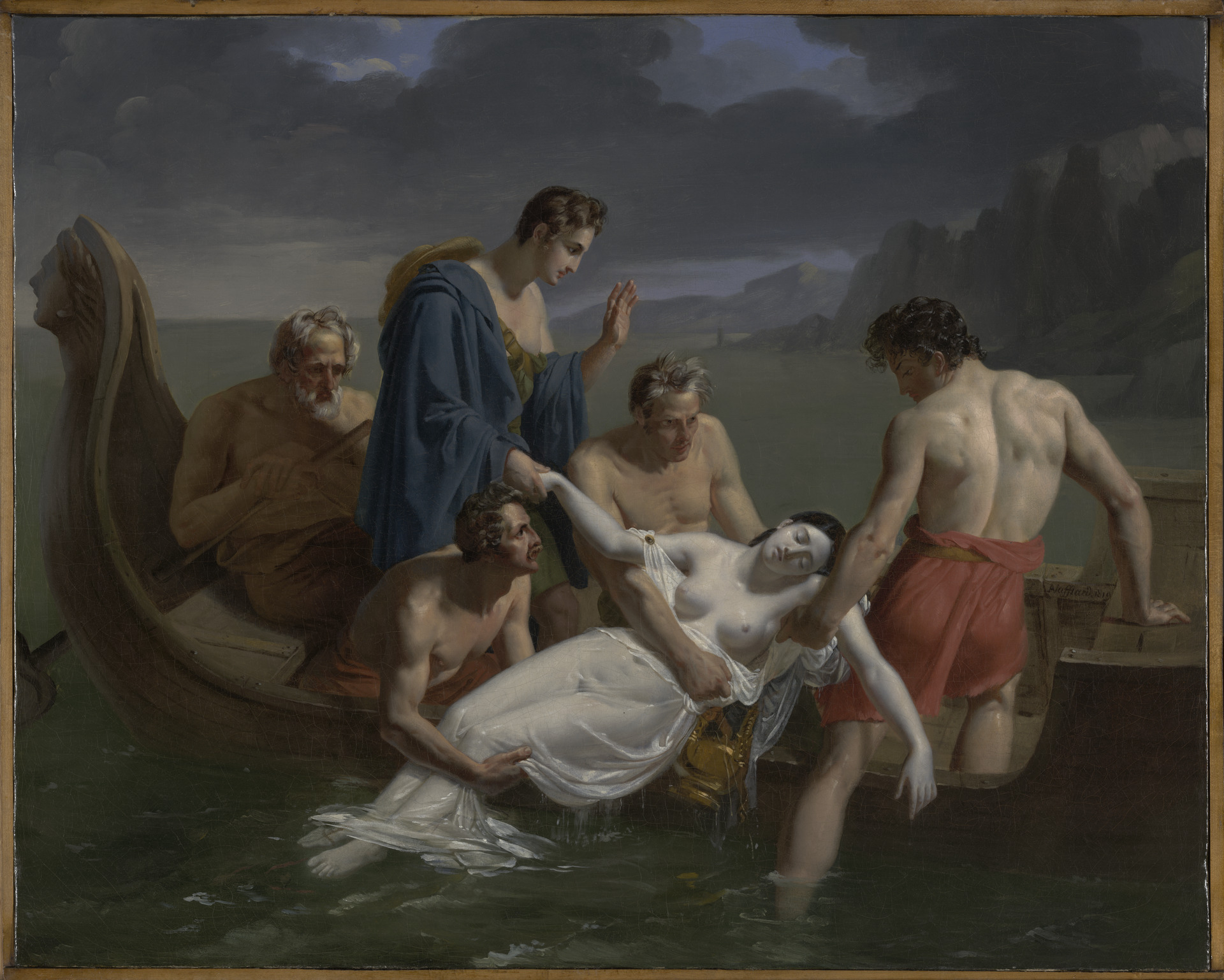
The Death of Sappho, 1819

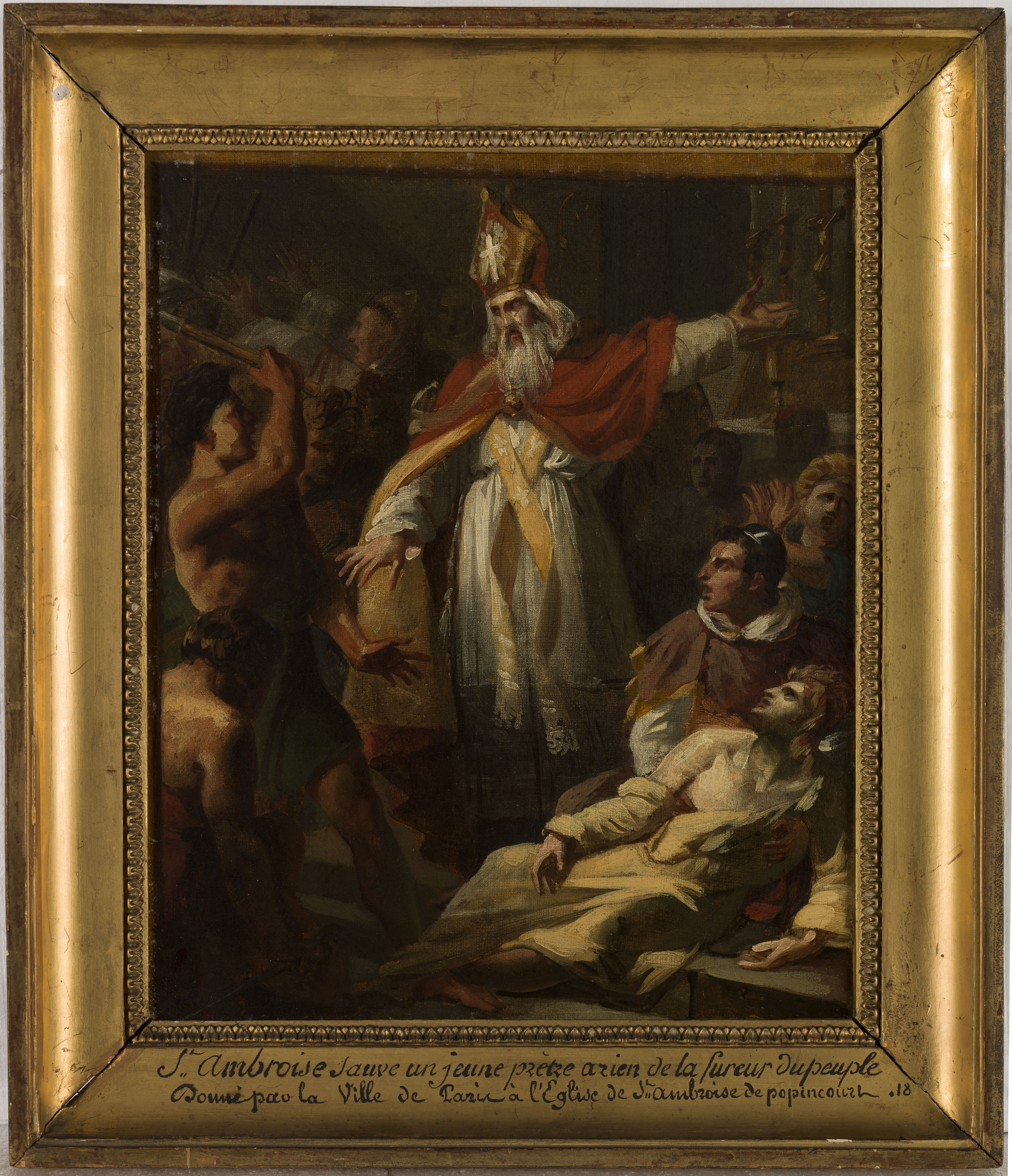
Saint Ambrose saving an Arian priest from the fury of the people, 1819

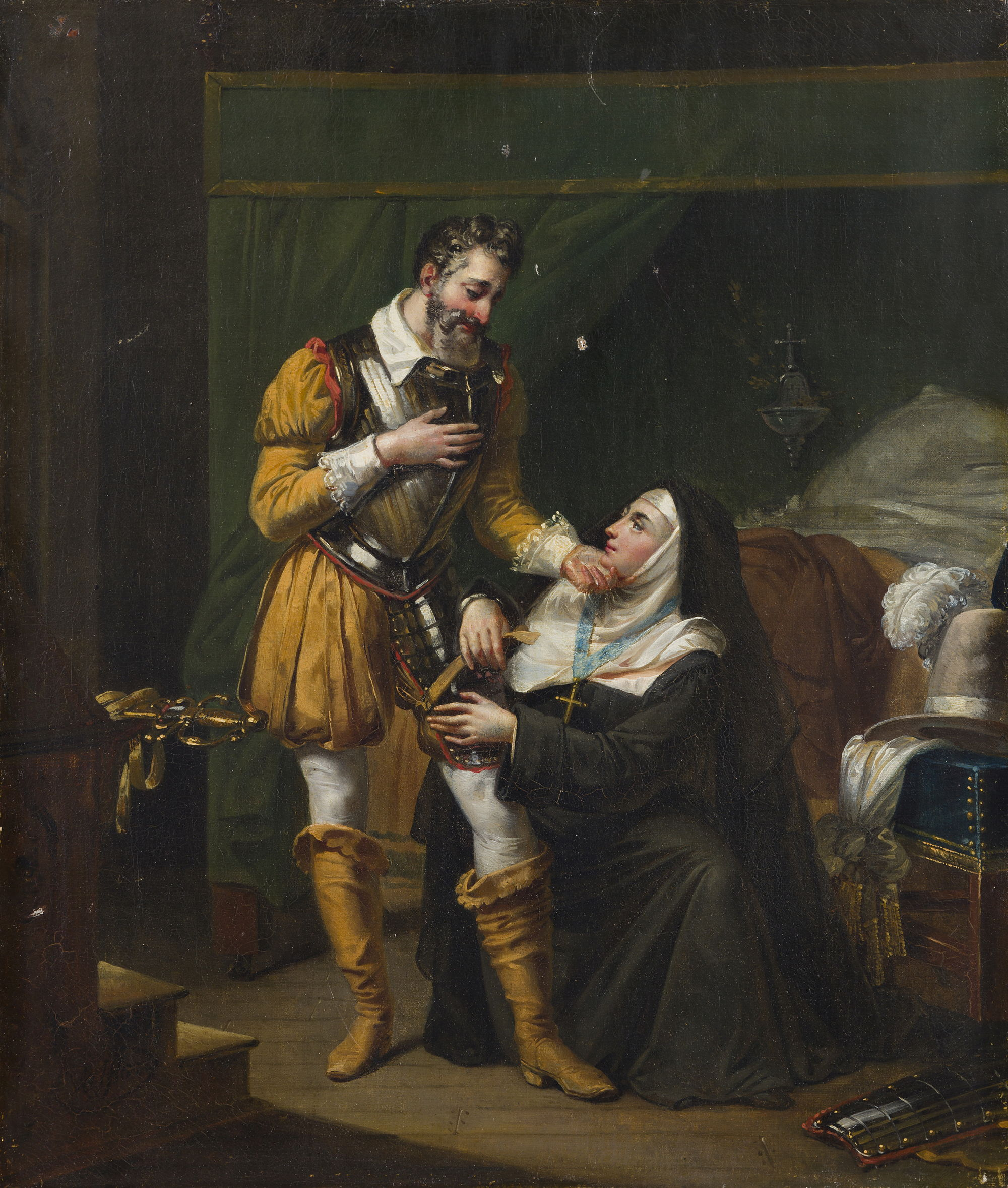
Henri IV and the Abbess of Montmartre, 1824

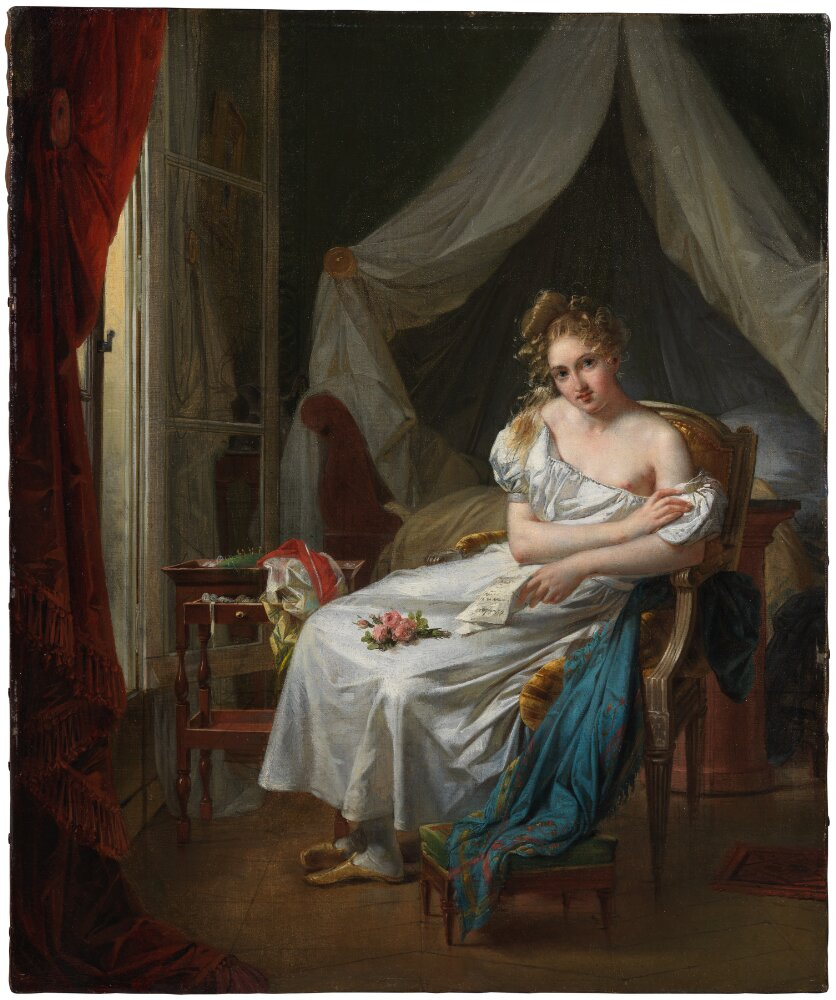
The Confession, 1829

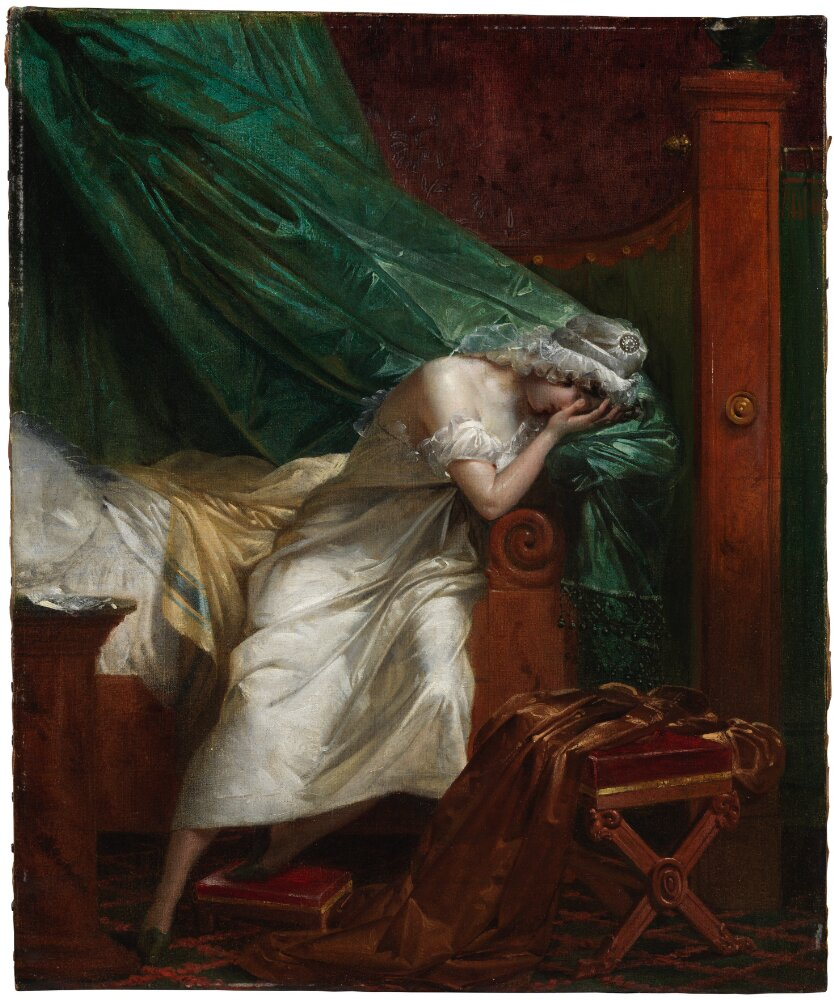
The Farewell, 1829

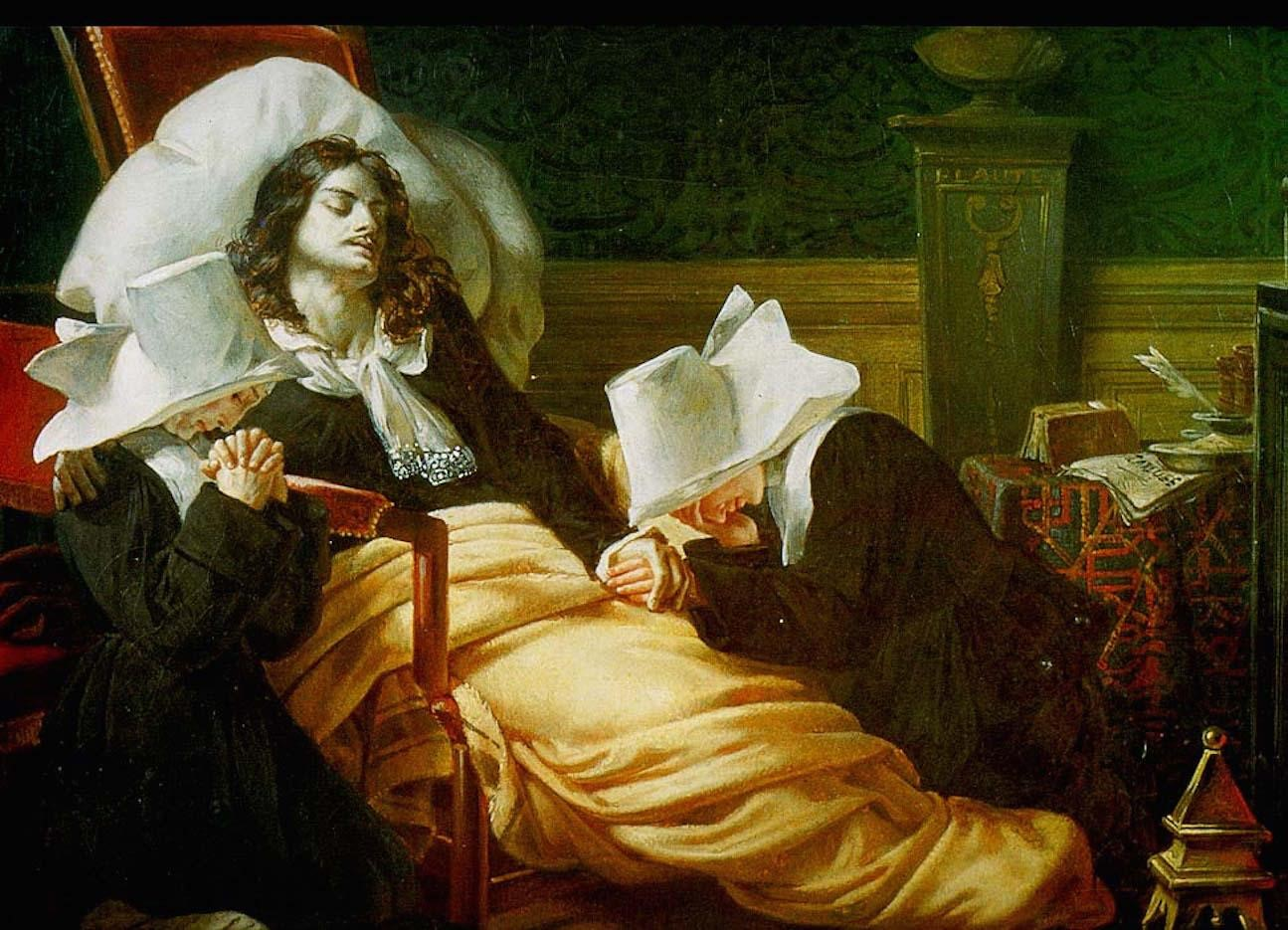
The Death of Molière
