= Édouard-Léon Scott de Martinville =

French printer and inventor (1817–1879)

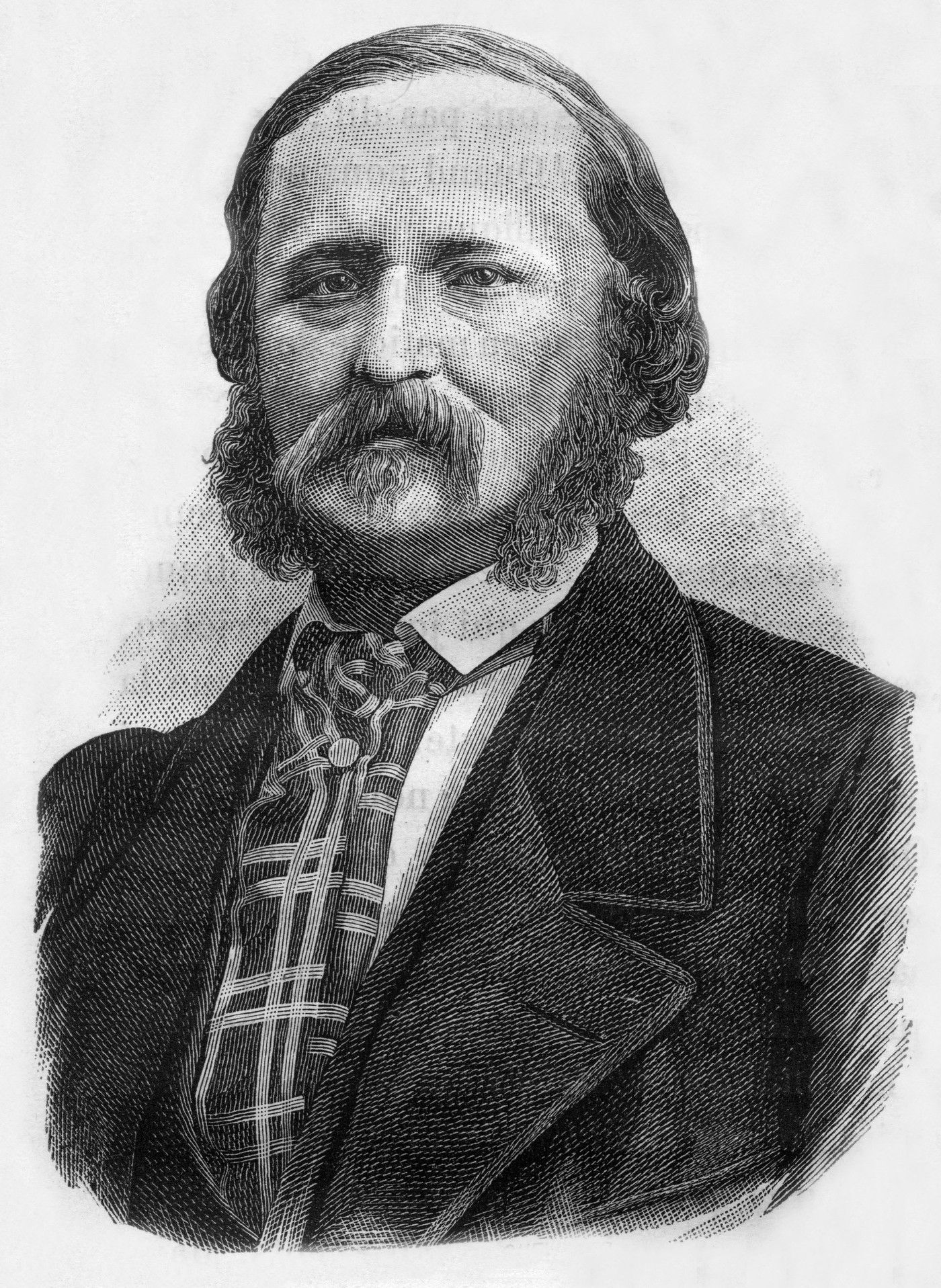
- Portrait from Les Merveilles de la science by Louis Figuier
- Born: 25 April 1817; Paris, France
- Died: 26 April 1879 (aged 62); Paris, France
- Occupations: Printer; Bookseller
- Known for: Inventing the earliest known sound recording device

Édouard-Léon Scott de Martinville (French: [edwaʁ le.ɔ̃ skɔt də maʁtɛ̃vil]; 25 April 1817 – 26 April 1879) was a French printer, bookseller and inventor.

He invented the earliest known sound recording device, the phonautograph, which was patented in France on 25 March 1857. Despite his innovation, he received little recognition during his lifetime, and his work was largely forgotten until the early 21st century, when phonautograph recordings made in 1860 were rediscovered and played back in 2008.

== Early years ==
As a printer by trade, he was able to read accounts of the latest scientific discoveries and became an inventor. Scott de Martinville was interested in recording the sound of human speech in a way similar to that achieved by the then-new technology of photography for light and image. He hoped for a form of stenography that could record the whole of a conversation without any omissions. His earliest interest was in an improved form of stenography, and he was the author of several papers on shorthand and a history of the subject (1849).

He was married twice and had six children.

== Phonautograph ==
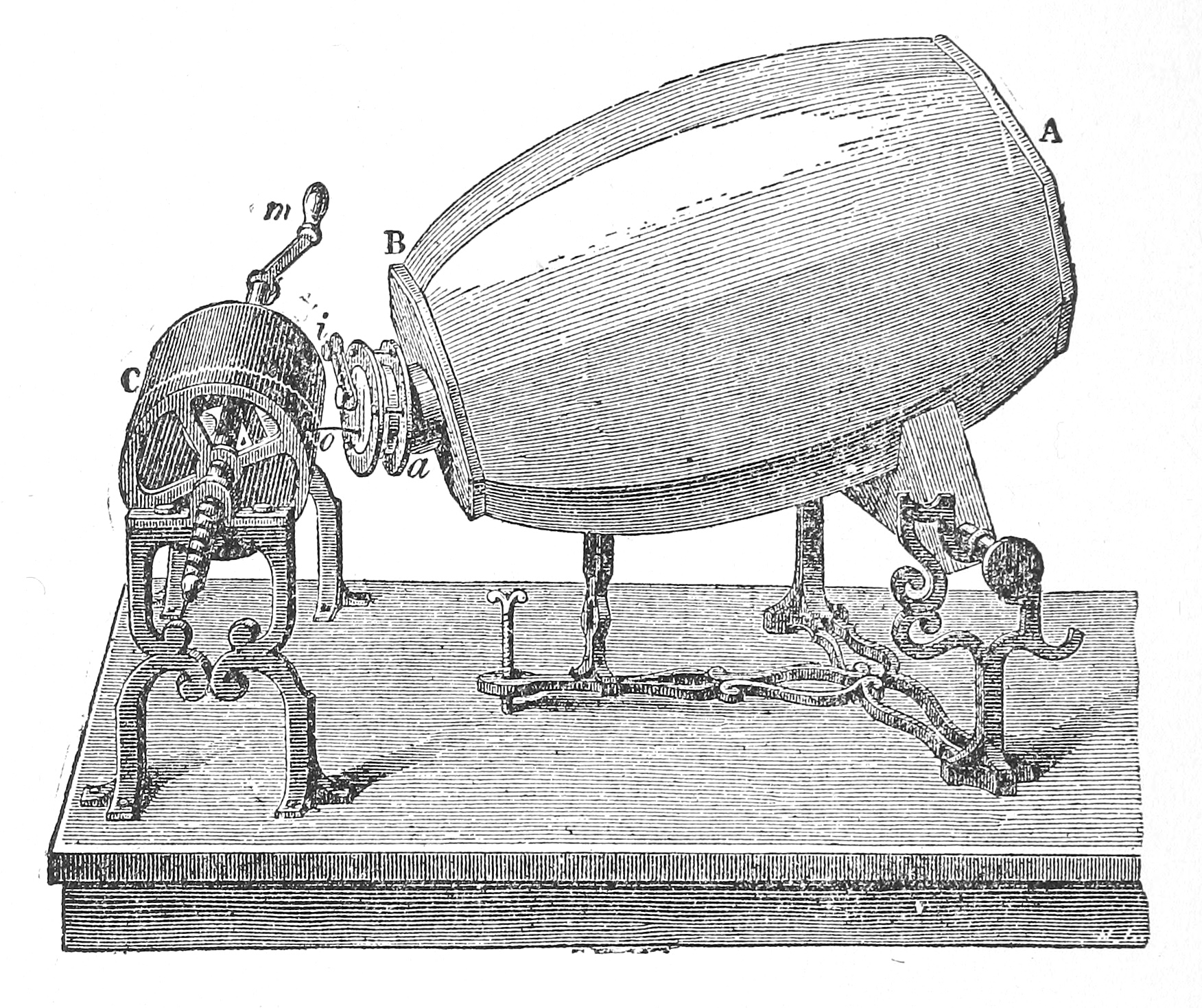
Illustration of a phonautograph. The inside of the barrel is made of Plaster of Paris.

From 1853, he became fascinated in a mechanical means of transcribing vocal sounds. While proofreading some engravings for a physics textbook, he came across drawings of the human ear. He sought to mimic the working in a mechanical device, substituting an elastic membrane for the tympanum, a series of levers for the ossicle, which moved a stylus he proposed would press on a paper, wood, or glass surface covered in lampblack. On 26 January 1857, he delivered his design in a sealed envelope to the Académie Française. On 25 March 1857, he received French patent #17,897/31,470 for the phonautograph.

To collect sound, the phonautograph used a horn attached to a diaphragm which vibrated a stiff bristle which inscribed an image on a lampblack-coated, hand-cranked cylinder. Scott built several devices with the help of acoustic instrument maker Rudolph Koenig. Unlike Thomas Edison's later invention of 1877, the phonograph, the phonautograph created only visual images of the sound and did not have the ability to play back its recordings. Instead, it captured sound waves visually on paper, allowing for the visualization of sound vibrations, which he called phonautograms. Scott de Martinville's intention was for the device's waves to be read by humans as one would read text, which proved unfeasible.

By 1857, with support from the Société d’encouragement pour l’industrie nationale, the phonautograph had advanced to a point where it could record sounds with sufficient accuracy. This development led to its adoption by the scientific community for various studies and experiments. It proved useful in the study of vowel sounds and was used by Franciscus Donders, Heinrich Schneebeli and Rene Marage. It also initiated further research into tools able to image sound, such as Koenig's manometric flame. He was not, however, able to profit from his invention, and spent the remainder of his life as a bookseller dealing in prints and photographs, at 9 Rue Vivienne in Paris.

Scott de Martinville also became interested in the relationship between linguistics, people's names and their character, and published a paper on the subject (1857).

== Rediscovery of the Au clair de la lune recording ==
Au clair de la lune
Earliest recognizable recording of the human voice, from 9 April 1860 (played at incorrect speed).

Au clair de la lune
The recording slowed down to match what is now believed to be the correct speed; the result reveals a man's voice, presumably Scott's.

Before March 2008, it was widely believed that Thomas Edison's phonograph was the first sound reproduction system. However, that year, phonautograms created by Édouard-Léon Scott de Martinville were discovered and revived by First Sounds, an informal collaborative of American audio historians, recording engineers, and sound archivists. The recording was converted from "squiggles on paper" to a playable digital audio file with the IRENE technology, developed by scientists at the Lawrence Berkeley National Laboratory in Berkeley, California. The New York Times reported the playback of a phonautogram recorded on 9 April 1860.

The recording, part of the French folk song Au clair de la lune ("By the Light of the Moon"), was initially played at a speed that produced what seemed to be a 10-second recording of the voice of a woman or child singing at an ordinary musical tempo. The researchers leading the project later found that a misunderstanding about an included reference frequency had resulted in a doubling of the correct playback speed, and that it was actually a 20-second recording of a man, possibly Scott himself, singing the song very slowly. It is now the earliest known intelligible recording of singing in existence, predating, by 28 years, several 1888 Edison wax cylinder phonograph recordings of a massed chorus performing Handel's oratorio Israel in Egypt. However, the recording went largely unnoticed and was overshadowed by Thomas Edison's phonograph, which famously recorded "Mary Had a Little Lamb."

Fifty of Scott de Martinville's recordings and associated notes were added to the UNESCO Memory of the World register in 2015.

== Additional recordings ==
Additional recordings include tuning fork, Au Clair de la lune, opening lines of Torquato Tasso's pastoral drama Aminta, Vocal scale and Fly, little bee.

A phonautogram by Scott containing the opening lines of Torquato Tasso's pastoral drama Aminta, has also been found. Recorded around 1860, probably after the recording of Au clair de la lune, this phonautogram is now the earliest known recording of intelligible human speech. Recordings of Scott's voice made in 1857 have also survived, but they are only unintelligible snippets. However, since then one of these recordings (1857 cornet scale recording) has been restored, and earlier records from 1853 experiments have been found and conserved.

Scott's phonautograms were selected by the Library of Congress as a 2010 addition to the National Recording Registry, which selects recordings annually that are "culturally, historically, or aesthetically significant".

== Abraham Lincoln recording myth ==
It has been claimed that in 1863, Scott's phonautograph was used to make a recording of Abraham Lincoln's voice at the White House. There is no solid evidence that such a recording ever existed. Scott did not visit the US in the 1860s and therefore could not have recorded Lincoln himself, as one version of the legend claims he did.

== Publications ==
- Jugement d'un ouvrier sur les romans et les feuilletons à l'occasion de Ferrand et Mariette (1847)
- Histoire de la sténographie depuis les temps anciens jusqu'à nos jours (1849)
- Les Noms de baptême et les prénoms (1857)
- Fixation graphique de la voix (1857)
- Notice sur la vie et les travaux de M. Adolphe-Noël Desvergers
- Essai de classification méthodique et synoptique des romans de chevalerie inédits et publiés. Premier appendice au catalogue raisonné des livres de la bibliothèque de M. Ambroise Firmin-Didot (1870)
- Le Problème de la parole s'écrivant elle-même. La France, l'Amérique (1878)
