= People of Western Europe speech =

1944 speech by Dwight D. Eisenhower

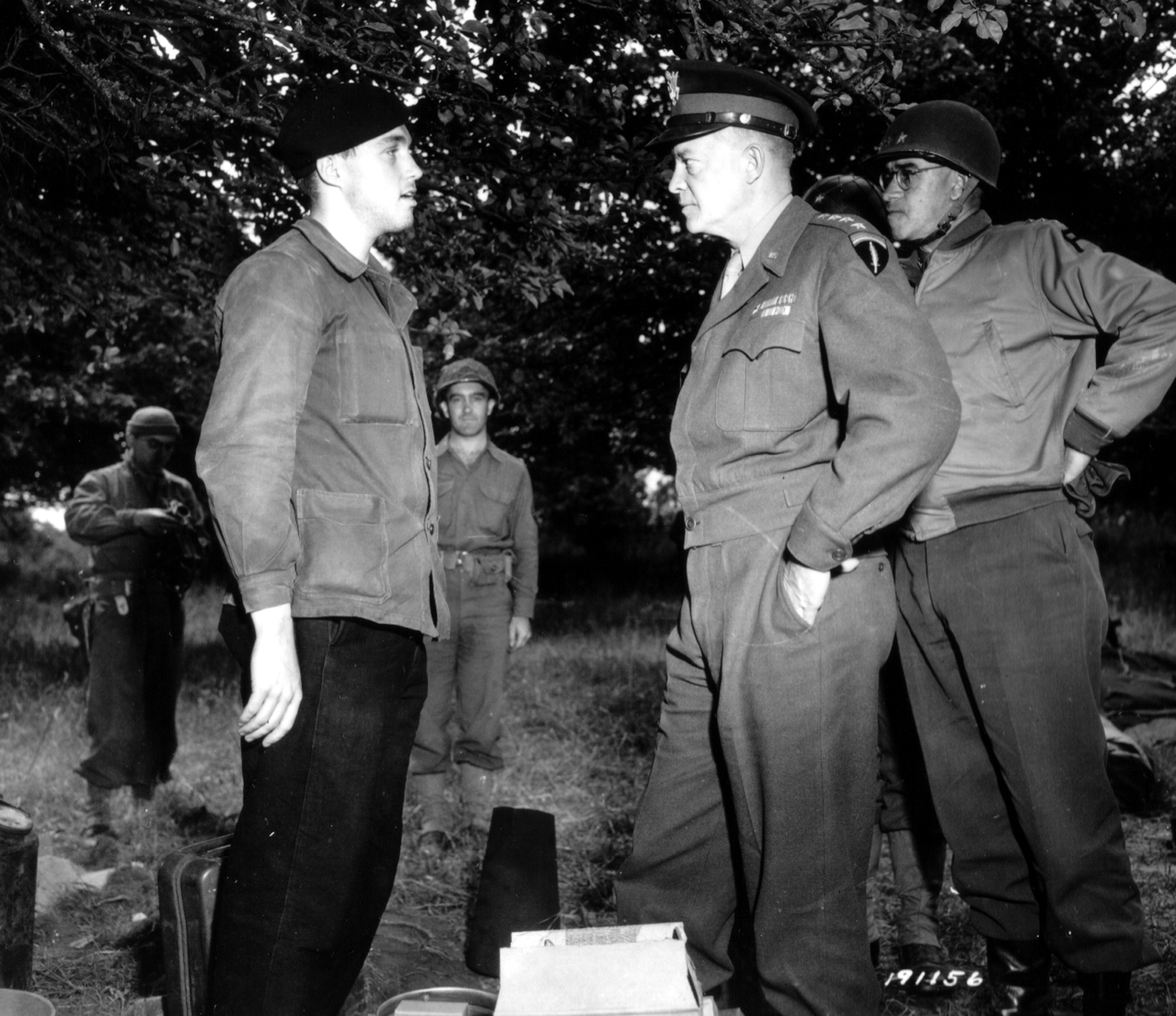
Eisenhower with a member of the French resistance, 1944

The "People of Western Europe" speech was made by Supreme Commander of the Allied Expeditionary Force General Dwight D. Eisenhower in the run-up to the invasion of Normandy in 1944. Addressed to the people of occupied Europe it informed them of the start of the invasion and advised them on the actions Eisenhower wanted them to take. It also addressed the Allies' plans for post-liberation government.

Approximately 47 million copies of the speech were printed, in five languages, for distribution to the peoples of Western Europe. A recording for radio broadcast was made on May 28 but, due to one problematic sentence, had to be re-recorded in the following days. One commentator states that Eisenhower's frustration and fatigue is discernible in the recording, when compared to his June 6, 1944, order of the day recorded on May 28. The speech was broadcast over British and American radio on D-Day, June 6.

The metal disc of the recording was delivered by the Americans to the BBC late at night at 200 Oxford Street, then the headquarters for some operations of the BBC World Service, where it was entrusted to young sound engineer Trevor Hill, who was told to test it for quality. After hearing the content, he was not allowed to go home, speak to anyone, or even go to the washroom without an MI5 escort, until the speech was officially broadcast. After D-Day, Hill attempted to give the disc to the BBC for storage, but was told that, as the recording was not made by the BBC, they were not interested in it. Hill promptly took the disc home and kept it in his father's attic for several years, before eventually turning it in for preservation.

== Background ==
The invasion of Normandy was a significant moment in World War II. A British, American and Canadian Allied Expeditionary Force landed in northern France on June 6, 1944 to begin the liberation of Western Europe from occupation by Nazi Germany. Eisenhower's People of Western Europe speech, named after its opening words, was addressed directly to the people of occupied countries. It informed them of the invasion, the Allied plans for post-liberation government and the actions Eisenhower wanted civilians to take in the meantime. Some 47 million printed copies of the speech were made in five languages for distribution to the occupied peoples of Europe.

== Content ==
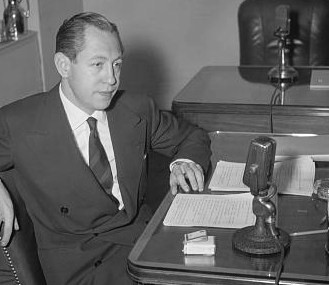
William S. Paley

In the speech Eisenhower asks resistance members to follow the orders of their leaders and for other citizens to avoid wasting their lives in unnecessary acts of resistance without further orders. He notes that the allied forces include Free French troops and, specifically addressing French citizens, reiterates his point that there should not be a "premature uprising", but there will be a time for armed resistance. Eisenhower promises that those who collaborated with Nazi Germany will be removed from power and states that Frenchmen, selected by the populace, will be placed in charge of the civil government of France after liberation. He also notes that further battles lie ahead and some destruction will be necessary to achieve victory.

A version of the speech was recorded on 28 May at the same time as his D-Day order of the day, addressed to members of the invasion force. However, Robert E. Sherwood of the psychological warfare division of the Supreme Headquarters Allied Expeditionary Force (SHAEF) raised concerns with the wording of one section of the recorded speech. It had originally been phrased that the people of Europe should "continue your passive resistance, but do not needlessly endanger your lives before I give you the signal to rise and strike the enemy"; Sherwood noted that it could be implied that Eisenhower expected people to "needlessly endanger" their lives when he gave the order to do so. He proposed that it be reworded to "but do not needlessly endanger your lives; wait until I give you the signal to rise and strike the enemy". Sherwood's senior, William S. Paley, attempted to alter the recording using a voiceover but could not replicate Eisenhower's voice and tone. The entire speech was therefore re-recorded with portable equipment at Eisenhower's headquarters closer to the time of the invasion. Rives considers that the frustration and fatigue that Eisenhower was experiencing at this time can be discerned in his speech, which is notably different from the upbeat tone of the order of the day recording.

Free French leader Charles de Gaulle criticised the speech for failing to mention him or the French Committee of National Liberation, though he was only presented a copy of the finished speech and had no opportunity to suggest amendments at draft stage. Some passages of the speech had been carefully crafted (for example noting only that the "initial landing" has been made in France) to leave open the possibility that the landings were a feint and that the main invasion was to take place elsewhere, which had been the intention of the wider Operation Bodyguard deception campaign.

== D-Day ==
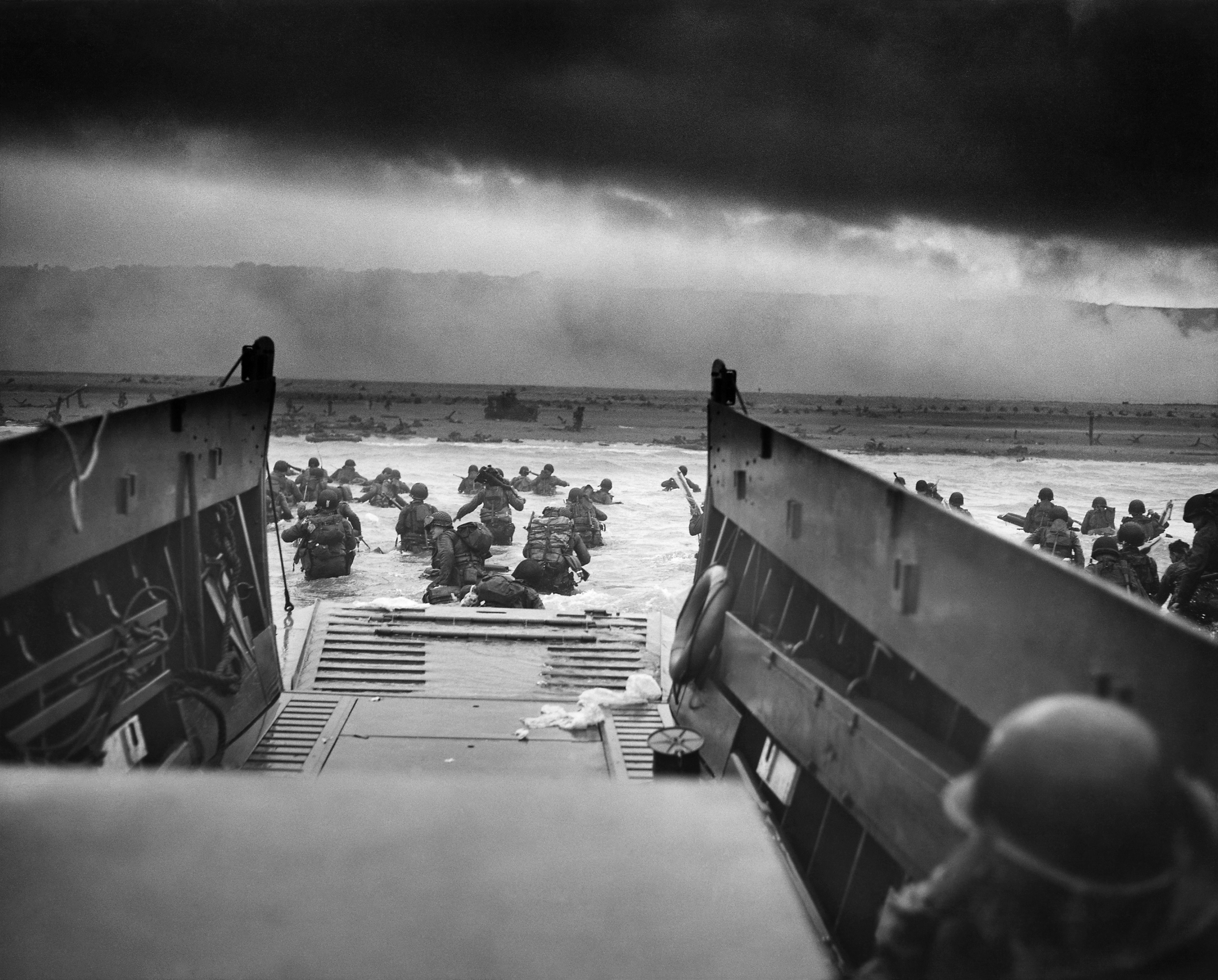
Omaha beach, 8.30am June 6, 1944

Airborne elements of the Allied Expeditionary Force landed in Normandy from around midnight on 5/6 June. The official notification of the invasion was withheld until the main landings could be confirmed to have commenced. This event began with the American landings at around 6.30am Central European Summer Time (CEST) and was confirmed to SHAEF headquarters by a radioman broadcasting the codeword "TOPFLIGHT". The British and Canadian landings happened around an hour later.

German radio stations in Berlin had been broadcasting the news of the invasion since 6.33 am (12.33 am Eastern War Time in New York) but American media could not confirm this and warned that the messages could be false. In the United Kingdom the first news of the invasion was broadcast at around 9.30 am British Double Summer Time (equivalent to CEST) and Eisenhower's speech and his order of the day, received on disc via military courier, were broadcast soon afterwards. The American broadcast of the speech followed the 3.48 am (Eastern War Time) broadcasts from the leaders of the governments-in-exile of Norway, Belgium and the Netherlands (in their native languages and in English).
