= June 6, 1944, order of the day =

World War II order

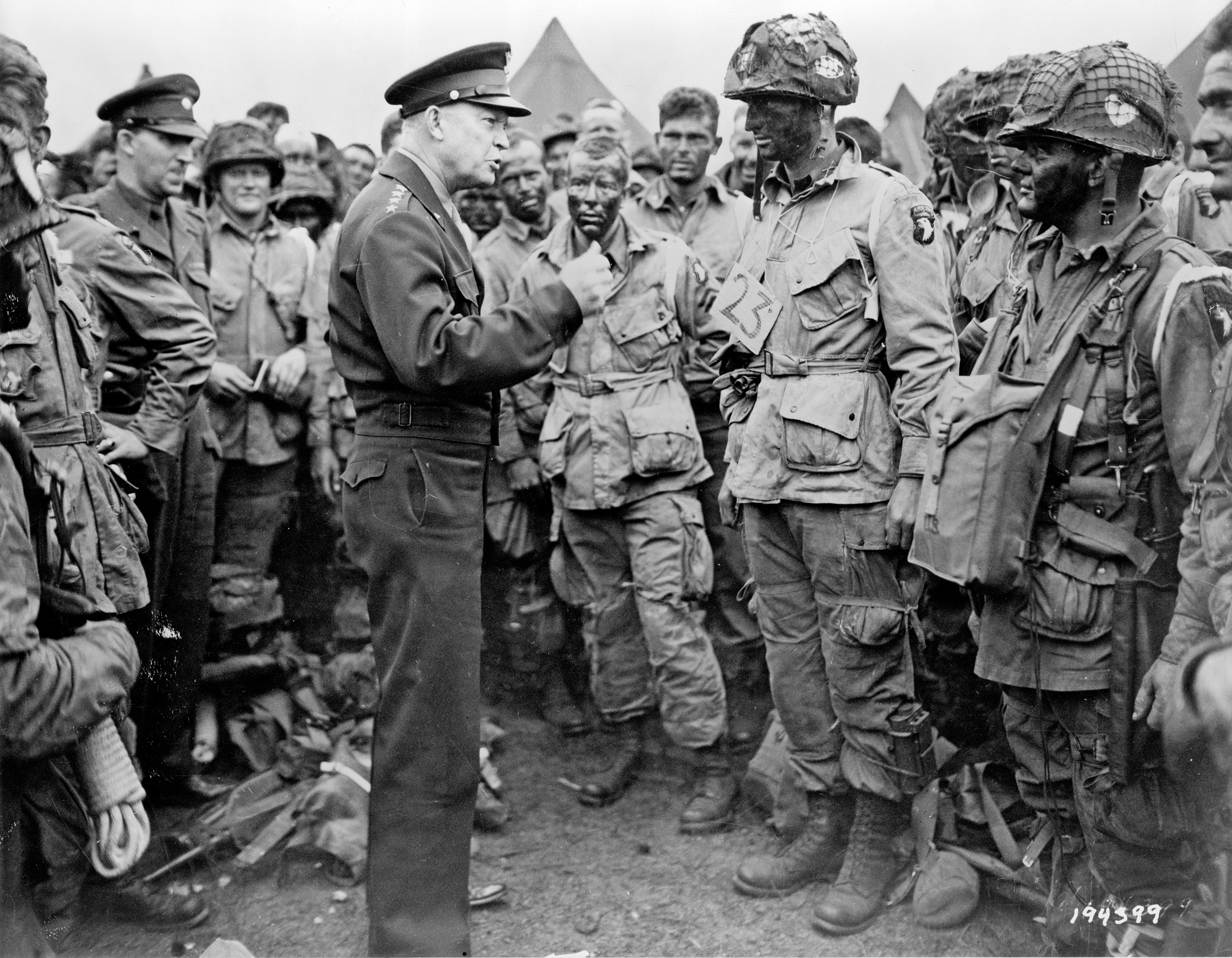
General Dwight D. Eisenhower speaking with US Army paratroopers on June 5, 1944 shortly before they parachuted into France

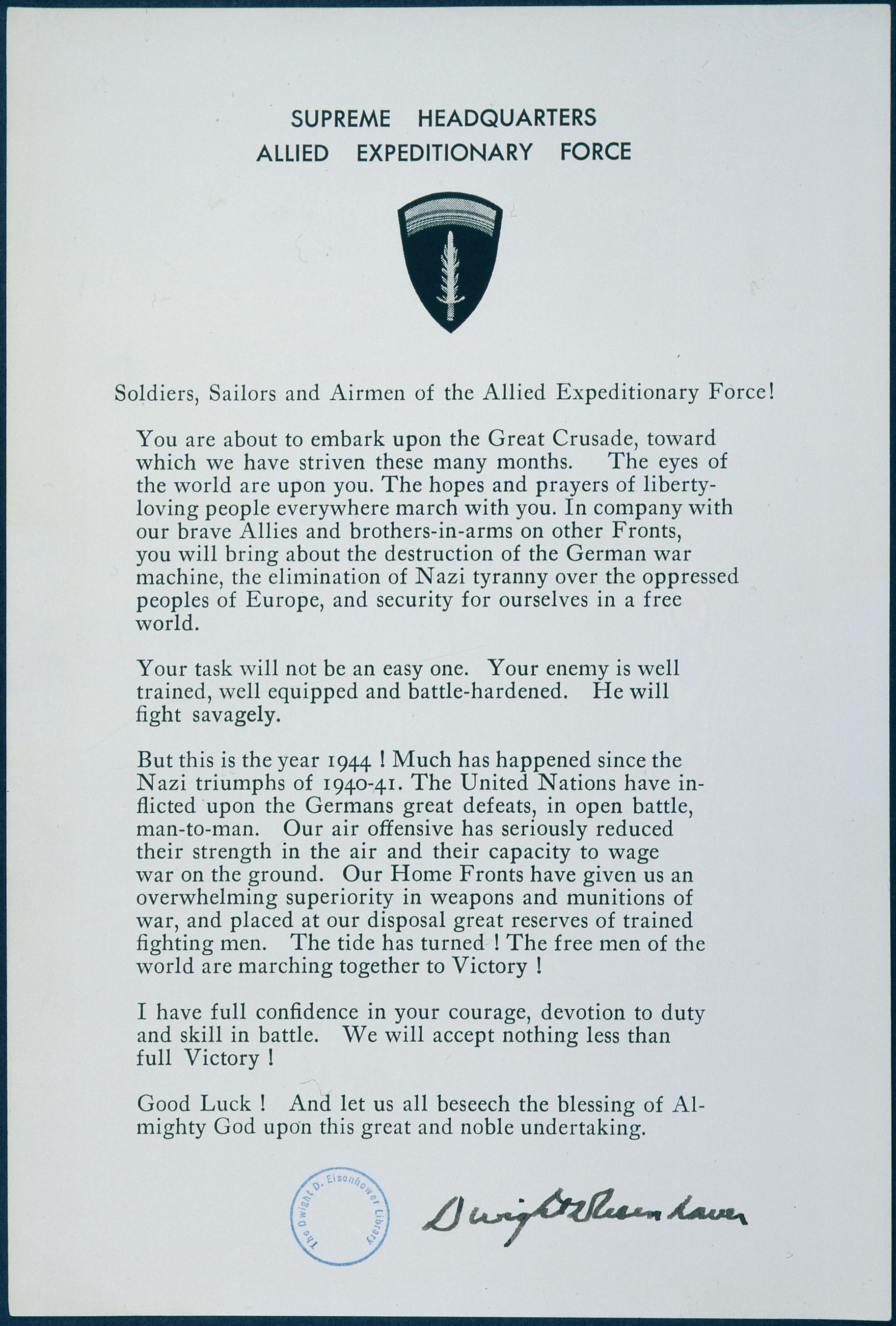
A printed version was distributed to members of the Allied Expeditionary Force.

The June 6, 1944, order of the day was issued by Supreme Commander of the Allied Expeditionary Force General Dwight D. Eisenhower to Allied forces on the eve of D-Day, the first day of the invasion of Normandy. The message was intended to impress upon the troops the importance of their mission which Eisenhower called a "Great Crusade". Eisenhower had been drafting the order since February 1944 and recorded a spoken version on May 28, that was broadcast on British and American radio on D-Day.

== Background ==
The invasion of Normandy and Operation Overlord as a whole was a significant moment in World War II. A British, American and Canadian Allied Expeditionary Force landed in northern France on June 6, 1944, (D-Day) to begin the liberation of Western Europe from Nazi Germany. Millions of troops were massed in England under the command of Supreme Commander of the Allied Expeditionary Force General Dwight D. Eisenhower. The Normandy landings were the largest amphibious warfare operation ever launched, with more than 166,000 crossing the English Channel to Normandy. As part of the planning, Eisenhower began drafting an order of the day, to be distributed to the invading troops, in February 1944.

== Order ==
The order is addressed to the "soldiers, sailors and airmen of the Allied Expeditionary Force ... about to embark upon the Great Crusade". It reminds the men that "the eyes of the world are upon you" and that the "hopes and prayers of liberty-loving people everywhere march with you" before recognising the contributions made by those fighting the Germans on other fronts. Eisenhower warns the men that the enemy is expected to "fight savagely" but that the "United Nations" have defeated German armies elsewhere and that the Allied air offensive has inflicted great damage; he also notes the Allied superiority in men, weaponry and munitions. He concludes by asking his men to pray for God to bless "this great and noble undertaking".

An earlier version of the order used plainer language, having "great undertaking" in place of "Great Crusade" and omitting mention of "liberty-loving people". Eisenhower also changed the placement of phrases in the order. He was responsible for moving the "eyes of the world" and "liberty-loving people" sentences from the end of the speech to near the start and for using "march with you" where the original had "go with you". Eisenhower also replaced "you may expect him to fight savagely" with "he will fight savagely" and the original closing phrase "we can and we will win" was amended to "we will accept nothing less than full victory!" with an exclamation point added.

On the eve of D-Day (June 5, 1944) the order was distributed as a printed leaflet to 175,000 members of the Allied forces. The order was intended to impress upon them the importance of the mission they were about to undertake. At the time of the invasion Eisenhower's order was widely distributed outside of the armed forces—it was read out to 50,000 people assembled in New York's Central Park on the evening of June 6—and has been reproduced since in books and films about the war. Eisenhower himself adapted the "Great Crusade" line for the title of his 1948 book about the war Crusade in Europe.

== Broadcast version ==
Recording of the order made May 28 for broadcast on D-Day

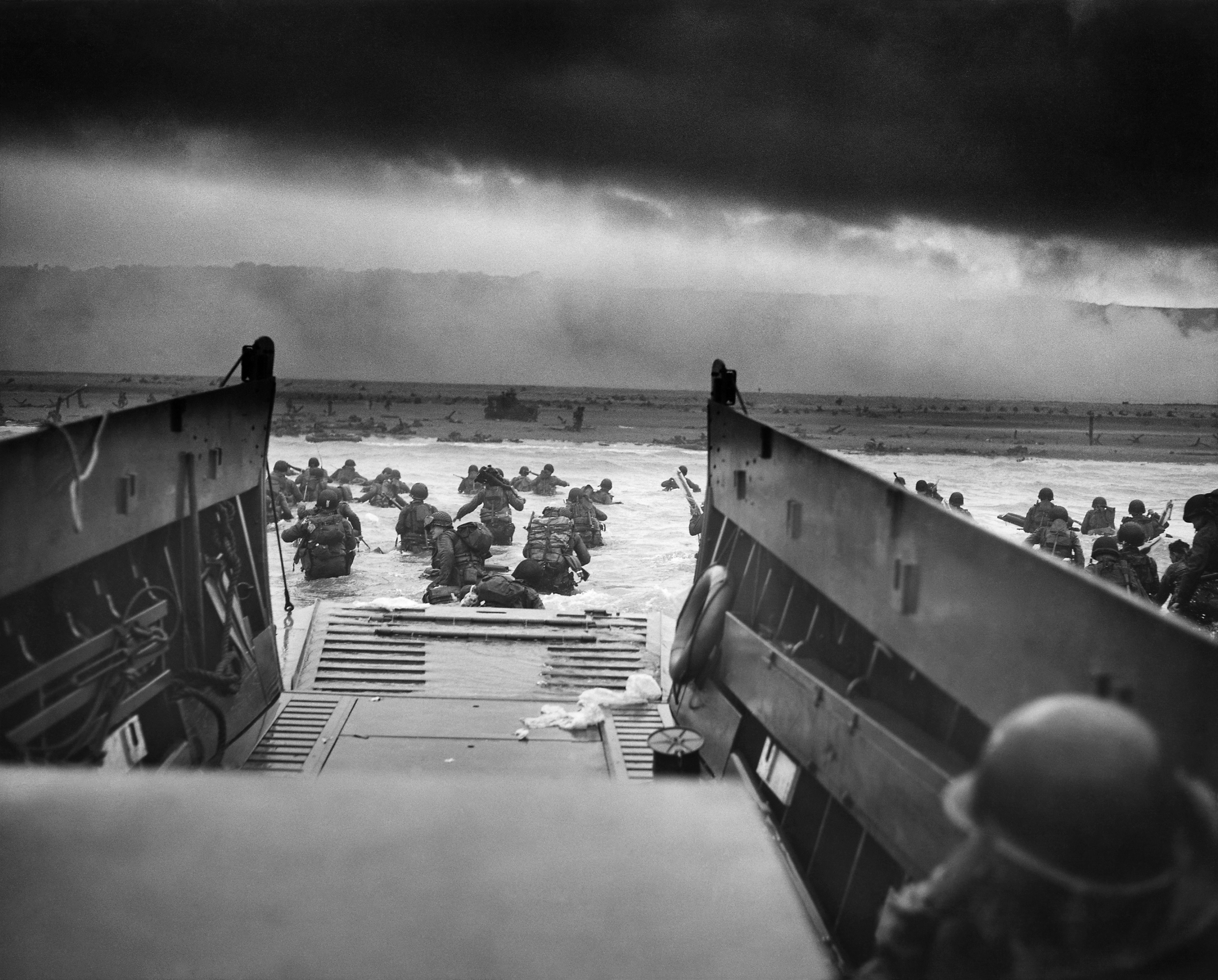
Omaha beach, 8.30am June 6, 1944

Eisenhower recorded a version for radio broadcast on 28 May, at which point the invasion was intended for 31 May or 1 June (poor weather delayed the landings until June 6). The recording has been described by Timothy Rives, Deputy Director of the Dwight D. Eisenhower Presidential Library, Museum and Boyhood Home, as "[ringing] with confidence", with Eisenhower sounding "reminiscent of the actor Clark Gable".

Airborne elements of the Allied Expeditionary Force landed in Normandy from around midnight on 5/6 June but official notification of the invasion was withheld until the naval landings were known to have begun. This event began with the American landings at around 6:30 a.m. Central European Summer Time (CEST) and was confirmed to SHAEF headquarters by a radioman transmitting the codeword TOPFLIGHT. The British and Canadian landings began around an hour later.

German radio stations in Berlin had been broadcasting the news of the invasion since 6:33 a.m. CEST (12:33 a.m. Eastern War Time in New York) but American media could not confirm this and warned that the messages could be false.

In the United Kingdom the first official confirmation of the invasion was broadcast on the BBC by John Snagge, who announced that Allied Armies had started landing "on the northern coast of France" at 9.32 am in British Double Summer Time (equivalent to CEST). The actual location (Normandy) was not given. Eisenhower's order, received on disc via military courier, was broadcast soon afterwards.

The American broadcast of the order was made almost simultaneously at 3:32 a.m. Eastern War Time, after the official SHAEF notification was made to the news corporations by Colonel Richard Ernest Dupuy. The order was followed, at 3:48 a.m. Eastern War Time by recorded messages from the leaders of the governments-in-exile of Norway, Belgium and the Netherlands (in their native languages and in English) and then Eisenhower's People of Western Europe speech.

== Failure message ==
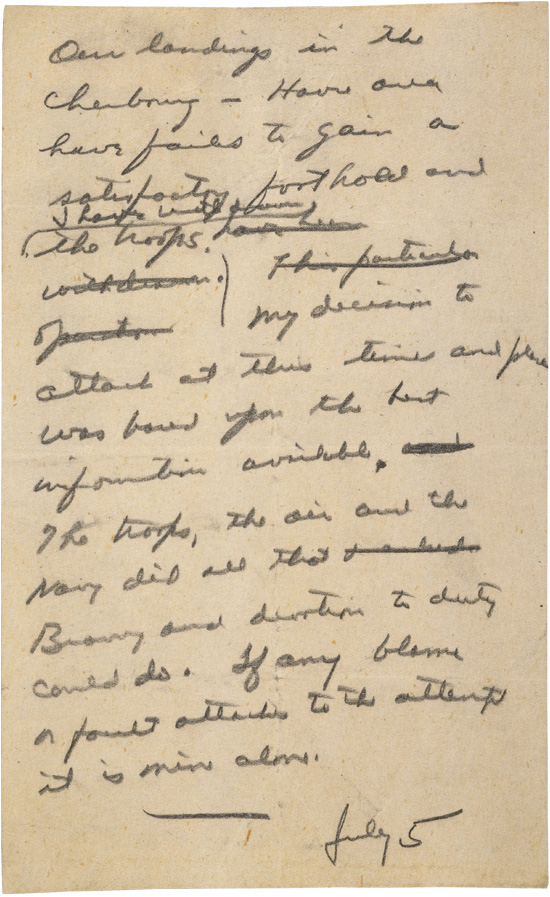
Eisenhower's failure message

Amid last minute delays caused by weather and disagreements over strategy and timing, Eisenhower wrote a short message to be issued in case the invasion was repulsed. The message was written with a pencil on a small notebook during the afternoon of June 5, Eisenhower having given the final order to proceed with the invasion that morning. He tore off the sheet and kept it in his wallet. Eisenhower rediscovered the note on July 11 and showed it to naval aide Harry C. Butcher, who persuaded Eisenhower to preserve the note for posterity; it is now in the collection of the presidential library. The note stated that "if any blame or fault attaches to the attempt it is mine alone". In his haste Eisenhower misdated the message July 5.
