= Operation Overlord =

World War II operation in France

- Part of the Western Front of World War II
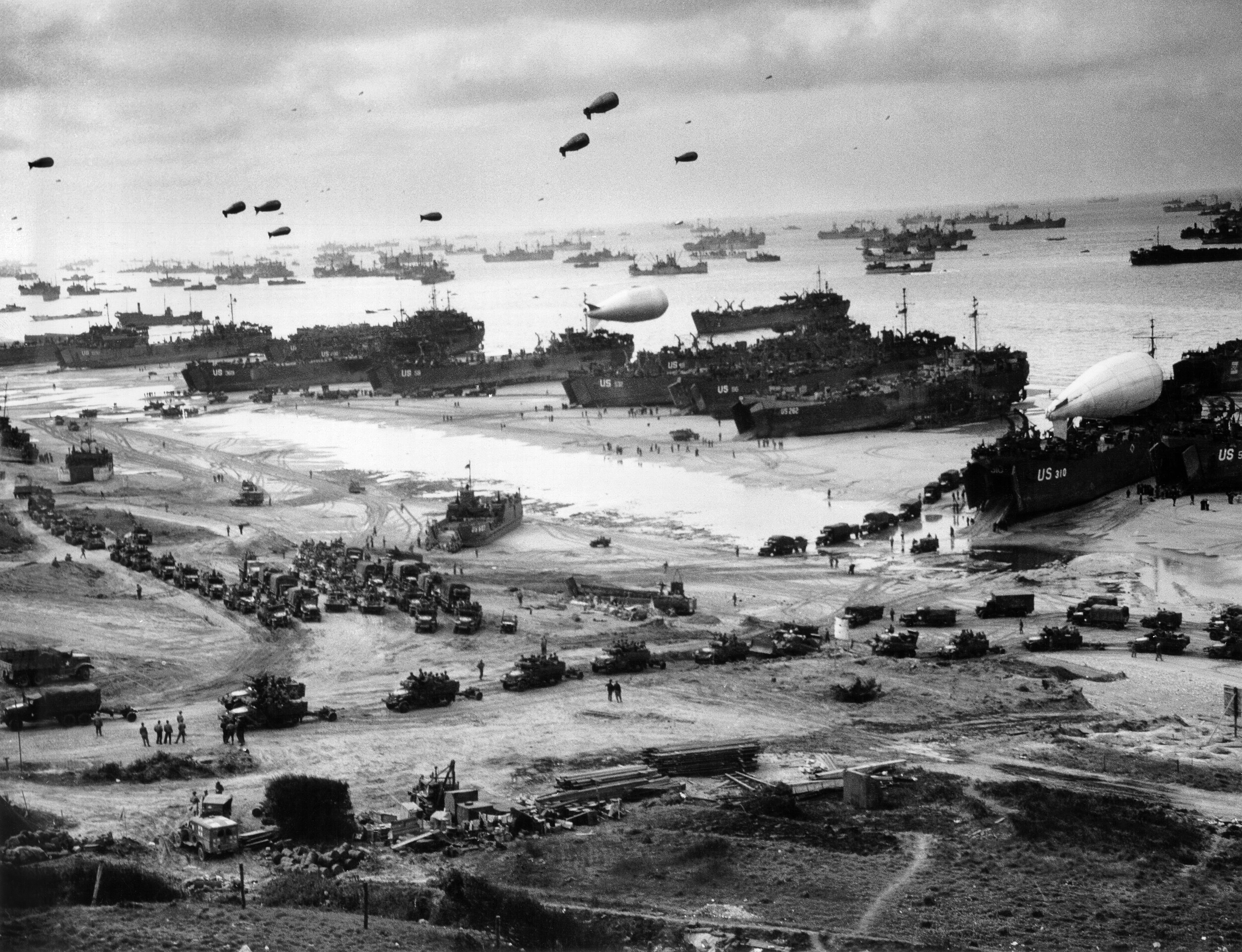
- LSTs with barrage balloons deployed, unloading supplies on Omaha Beach for the breakout from Normandy
Date	6 June – 30 August 1944 (2 months, 3 weeks and 3 days)
Location	Northern France 49.34°N 0.60°W
Result	Allied victory

Belligerents
Allies; United States; United Kingdom; Canada; France; Poland; Australia; New Zealand; Belgium; Czechoslovakia; Greece; Luxembourg; Netherlands; Norway; South Africa; Southern Rhodesia	Axis; Germany; Italian Social Republic (Note: The Italian Social Republic forces during Operation Overlord were composed of the 4,000 men of the 1st Atlantic Naval Infantry Division. About 200 of them were stationed on the island of Cézembre during the Battle of Saint-Malo. Other forces include former prisoners-of-war put in labor and anti-air units.)

Commanders and leaders
SHAEF: (United States) Dwight D. Eisenhower; 21st Army Group: (United Kingdom) Bernard Montgomery; (United Kingdom) Miles Dempsey; (United States) Omar Bradley; Harry Crerar; (United States) George S. Patton; Allied Air Force: (United Kingdom) Trafford Leigh-Mallory; (United States) Hoyt Vandenberg; (United Kingdom) Arthur Coningham; Allied naval force: (United Kingdom) Bertram Ramsay	OKW: (Nazi Germany) Adolf Hitler; OB West; (Nazi Germany) Gerd von Rundstedt; (Nazi Germany) Günther von Kluge; Army Group B; (Nazi Germany) Erwin Rommel; (Nazi Germany) Walter Model; (Nazi Germany) Friedrich Dollmann; (Nazi Germany) Paul Hausser; (Nazi Germany) Kurt v.d. Chevallerie; Panzer Group West: (Nazi Germany) Geyr v. Schweppenburg; (Nazi Germany) Heinrich Eberbach

Strength
More than 1,452,000 troops by 25 July (Note: Around 812,000 were American and 640,000 were British or Canadian); 2,052,299 (by the end of August)	380,000 troops (by 23 July); ~640,000 troops total; 2,200–2,500 tanks and assault guns

Casualties and losses
(United States) 124,394 casualties; 20,668 killed (Note: American casualties are sourced from the G-3 War Room Summary 91, dated 5 September 1944, covering the campaign. In 1953, the US Statistical and Accounting Branch, Office of the Adjutant General issued a final report on US casualties (excluding Air Force losses) for the period from 6 June to 14 September 1944. This source shows the number killed in action during the Battle of Normandy (6 June – 24 July 1944) as 13,959 and Northern France (25 July to 14 September 1944) as 15,239 for a total of 29,198. Total deaths among battle casualties (including accidental deaths, disease, etc) for Normandy (6 June – 24 July 1944) were 16,293 and in Northern France (25 July – 14 September 1944) were 17,844, for a total of 34,137.); (United Kingdom) ~65,000 casualties; 11,000 killed; 54,000 wounded or missing; (Canada) 18,444 casualties; 5,021 killed; (Poland) 2,097 casualties; 16,714 Allied airmen killed (8,536 members of the USAAF, and 8,178 flying under the command of the RAF): 226,386 casualties in total (Note: In addition, the Allied air forces made 480,317 sorties directly connected to the operation, with the loss of 4,101 planes and 16,714 lives.); 4,101 aircraft; ~4,000 tanks	~80,000 killed 233,000 captured Casualties differ by source; 2,127 aircraft; 1,500–2,400 tanks and assault guns lost
- Civilian deaths: 11,000–19,000 killed in pre-invasion bombing; 13,632–19,890 killed during invasion; Total: 25,000–39,000 killed

Operation Overlord was the codename for the Battle of Normandy, the Allied operation that launched the successful invasion of German-occupied Western Europe during World War II. The operation was launched on 6 June 1944 (D-Day) with the Normandy landings (Operation Neptune). A 1,200-plane airborne assault preceded an amphibious assault involving more than 5,000 vessels. Nearly 160,000 troops crossed the English Channel on 6 June, and more than two million Allied troops were in France by the end of August.

The decision to undertake cross-channel landings in 1944 was made at the Trident Conference in Washington, D.C., in May 1943. American General Dwight D. Eisenhower was appointed commander of Supreme Headquarters Allied Expeditionary Force, and British General Bernard Montgomery was named commander of the 21st Army Group, which comprised all the land forces involved in the operation. The Normandy coast in northwestern France was chosen as the site of the landings, with the Americans assigned to land at sectors codenamed Utah and Omaha, the British at Sword and Gold, and the Canadians at Juno. To meet the conditions expected on the Normandy beachhead, special technology was developed, including two artificial ports called Mulberry harbours and an array of specialised tanks nicknamed Hobart's Funnies. In the months leading up to the landings, the Allies conducted Operation Bodyguard, a substantial military deception that used electronic and visual misinformation to mislead the Germans as to the date and location of the main Allied landings. Adolf Hitler placed Field Marshal Erwin Rommel in charge of developing fortifications all along Hitler's proclaimed Atlantic Wall in anticipation of landings in France.

The Allies failed to accomplish their objectives for the first day, but gained a tenuous foothold that they gradually expanded when they captured the port at Cherbourg on 26 June and the city of Caen on 21 July. A failed counterattack by German forces in response to Allied advances on 7 August left 50,000 soldiers of the German 7th Army trapped in the Falaise pocket by 19 August. The Allies launched a second invasion from the Mediterranean Sea of southern France (code-named Operation Dragoon) on 15 August, and the Liberation of Paris followed on 25 August. German forces retreated east across the Seine on 30 August 1944, marking the close of Operation Overlord.

== Preparations for D-Day ==
In June 1940, Germany's leader Adolf Hitler had triumphed in what he called "the most famous victory in history"—the fall of France. British craft evacuated over 338,000 Allied troops trapped along the northern coast of France (including much of the British Expeditionary Force) to England in the Dunkirk evacuation (27 May to 4 June). British planners reported to Prime Minister Winston Churchill on 4 October that even with the help of other Commonwealth countries and the United States, it would not be possible to regain a foothold in continental Europe in the near future. After the Axis invaded the Soviet Union in June 1941, Soviet leader Joseph Stalin began pressing for a second front in Western Europe. Churchill declined because he felt that even with American help the British did not have adequate forces to do it, and he wished to avoid costly frontal assaults such as those that had occurred at the Somme and Passchendaele in World War I.

Two temporary plans code-named Operation Roundup and Operation Sledgehammer were put forward for 1942–43, but neither was deemed by the British to be practical or likely to succeed. Instead, the Allies expanded their activity in the Mediterranean, launching Operation Torch, an invasion of French North Africa, in November 1942, the Allied invasion of Sicily in July 1943, and Allied invasion of Italy in September. These campaigns provided the troops with valuable experience in amphibious warfare.

Those attending the Trident Conference in Washington in May 1943 took the decision to launch a cross-Channel invasion within the next year. Churchill favoured continued Allied operations in the Mediterranean rather than an immediate cross-Channel invasion, as a plan had not yet been devised that was likely to succeed. General George C. Marshall and the Joint Chiefs of Staff favoured the cross-channel approach. However, historian Maurice Matloff notes that "a number of misconceptions grew up in the postwar period about this Anglo-American debate over strategy," and that "it is a mistake to assume that the British did not from the first want a cross-Channel operation". Planners of both nations agreed that an invasion would have to be postponed until German forces were weaker, the required landing craft were available, and logistical infrastructure was in place. Marshall ultimately conceded the case for continued Mediterranean operations, as long as it did not impede the efforts toward a landing in northern France. President Roosevelt's position was to postpone the decision a few months.

Alan Brooke, 1st Viscount Alanbrooke appointed British Lieutenant-General Frederick E. Morgan as Chief of Staff, Supreme Allied Commander (COSSAC), to begin detailed planning. Alanbrooke commented on the operation, saying, "Well there it is, it won't work, but you must bloody well make it". The initial plans were constrained by the number of landing craft, most of which were already committed in the Mediterranean and in the Pacific. In part because of lessons learned in the Dieppe Raid of 19 August 1942, the Allies decided not to directly assault a heavily defended French seaport in their first landing. The failure at Dieppe also highlighted the need for adequate artillery and air support, particularly close air support, and specialised ships able to travel extremely close to shore. The short operating range of British aircraft such as the Supermarine Spitfire and Hawker Typhoon greatly limited the number of potential landing-sites, as comprehensive air support depended upon having planes overhead for as long as possible. Morgan considered four sites for the landings: Brittany, the Cotentin Peninsula, Normandy, and the Pas-de-Calais. As Brittany and Cotentin are peninsulas, the Germans could have cut off the Allied advance at a relatively narrow isthmus, so these sites were rejected.

The Pas-de-Calais, the closest point in continental Europe to Britain, was the location of launch sites for V-1 and V-2 rockets, then still under development. (Note: V-weapons were first launched against the UK on 12 June.) The Germans regarded it as the most likely initial landing zone and accordingly made it the most heavily fortified region; however, it offered the Allies few opportunities for expansion as the area is bounded by numerous rivers and canals. On the other hand, landings on a broad front in Normandy would permit simultaneous threats against the port of Cherbourg, coastal ports further west in Brittany, and an overland attack towards Paris and eventually into Germany. The Allies therefore chose Normandy as the landing site. The most serious drawback of the Normandy coast – the lack of port facilities – would be overcome through the development and deployment of artificial harbours.

The COSSAC staff planned to begin the invasion on 1 May 1944. The initial draft of the plan was accepted at the Quebec Conference in August 1943. General Dwight D. Eisenhower was appointed commander of Supreme Headquarters Allied Expeditionary Force (SHAEF). General Bernard Montgomery was named commander of the 21st Army Group, which comprised all of the land forces involved in the invasion. On 31 December 1943, Eisenhower and Montgomery first saw the COSSAC plan, which proposed amphibious landings by three divisions, with two more divisions in support. The two generals immediately insisted on expanding the scale of the initial invasion to five divisions, with airborne descents by three additional divisions, to allow operations on a wider front and to speed up the capture of the port at Cherbourg. This significant expansion required the acquisition of additional landing craft, which caused the invasion to be delayed by a month until June 1944. Eventually the Allies committed 39 divisions to the Battle of Normandy: 22 American, 12 British, 3 Canadian, 1 Polish, and 1 French, totalling over a million troops. (Note: The British 79th Armoured Division never operated as a single formation, and thus has been excluded from the total. In addition, a combined total of 16 (three from the 79th Armoured Division) British, Belgian, Canadian, and Dutch independent brigades were committed to the operation, along with four battalions of the Special Air Service.)

=== Allied invasion plan ===
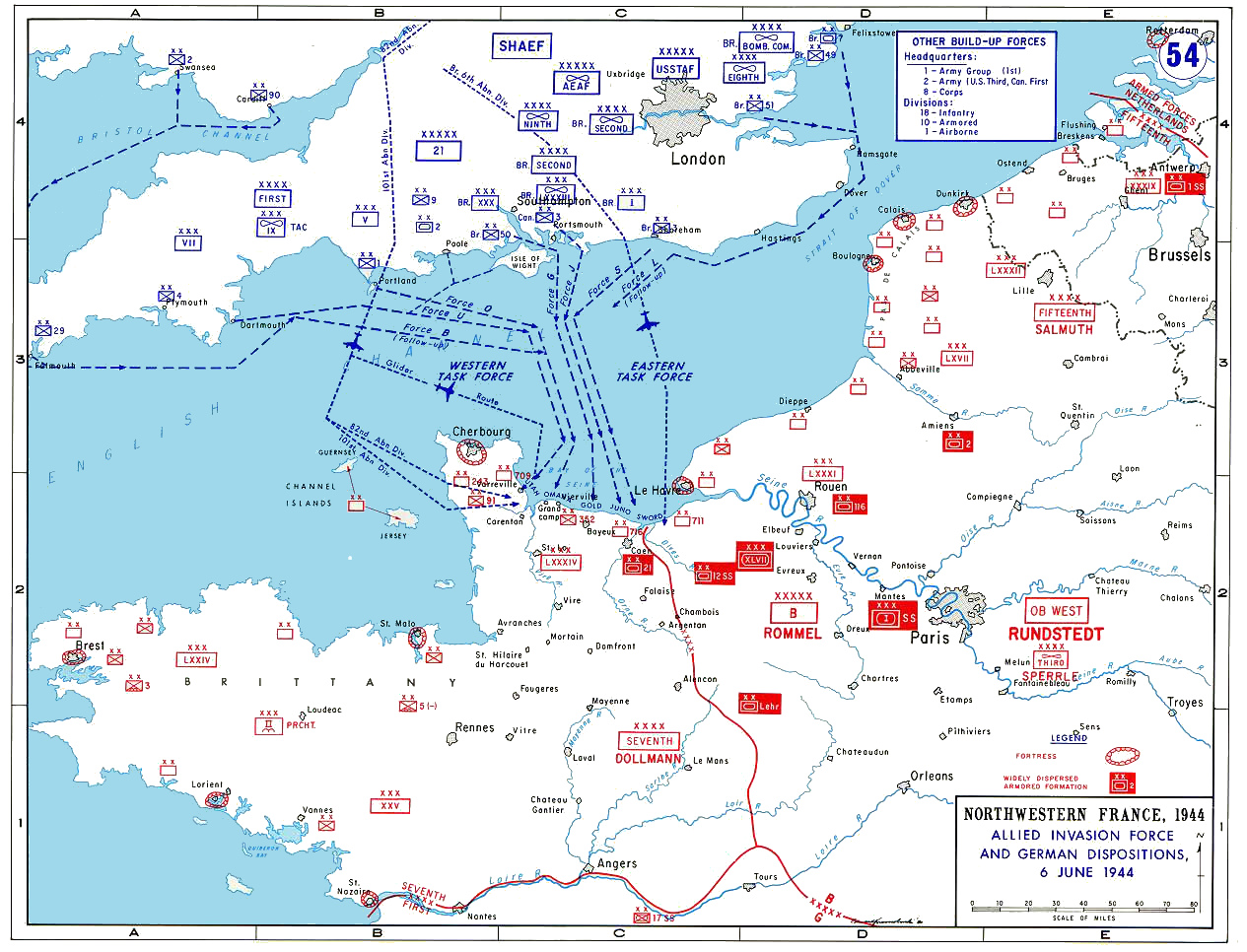
D-day assault routes into Normandy

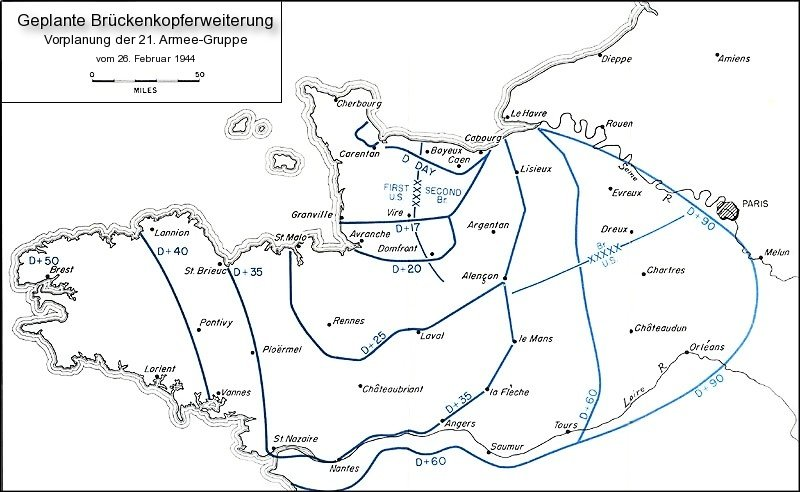
Forecast of the development of the lodgement, prepared in February 1944

"Overlord" was the name assigned to the establishment of a large-scale lodgement on the Continent. The first phase, the amphibious invasion and establishment of a secure foothold, was code-named Operation Neptune and is often referred to as "D-Day". To gain the required air superiority needed to ensure a successful invasion, the Allies launched a strategic bombing campaign (codenamed Pointblank) to target German aircraft-production, fuel supplies, and airfields. Under the Transport Plan, communications infrastructure and road and rail links were bombed to cut off the north of France and to make it more difficult to bring up reinforcements. These attacks were widespread so as to avoid revealing the exact location of the invasion. Elaborate deceptions were planned to prevent the Germans from determining the timing and location of the invasion.

The coastline of Normandy was divided into seventeen sectors, with code-names using a spelling alphabet—from Able, west of Omaha, to Roger on the east flank of Sword. Eight further sectors were added when the invasion was extended to include Utah on the Cotentin Peninsula. Sectors were further subdivided into beaches identified by the colours Green, Red, and White.

Allied planners envisaged preceding the sea-borne landings with airborne drops: near Caen on the eastern flank to secure the Orne River bridges, and north of Carentan on the western flank. The initial goal was to capture Carentan, Isigny, Bayeux, and Caen. The Americans, assigned to land at Utah and Omaha, were to cut off the Cotentin Peninsula and capture the port facilities at Cherbourg. The British at Sword and Gold, and the Canadians at Juno, were to capture Caen and form a front line from Caumont-l'Éventé to the south-east of Caen to protect the American flank, while establishing airfields near Caen. Possession of Caen and its surroundings would give the Anglo-Canadian forces a suitable staging area for a push south to capture the town of Falaise. A secure lodgement would be established and an attempt made to hold all territory captured north of the Avranches-Falaise line during the first three weeks. The Allied armies would then swing left to advance towards the River Seine.

The invasion fleet, led by Admiral Sir Bertram Ramsay, was split into the Western Naval Task Force (under Admiral Alan Kirk) supporting the American sectors and the Eastern Naval Task Force (under Admiral Sir Philip Vian) in the British and Canadian sectors. The American forces of the First Army, led by Lieutenant General Omar Bradley, comprised VII Corps (Utah) and V Corps (Omaha). On the British side, Lieutenant-General Miles Dempsey commanded the Second Army, under which XXX Corps was assigned to Gold and I Corps to Juno and Sword. Land forces were under the command of Montgomery, and air command was assigned to Air Chief Marshal Sir Trafford Leigh-Mallory. The First Canadian Army included personnel and units from Poland, Belgium, and the Netherlands. Other Allied nations participated.

=== Reconnaissance ===
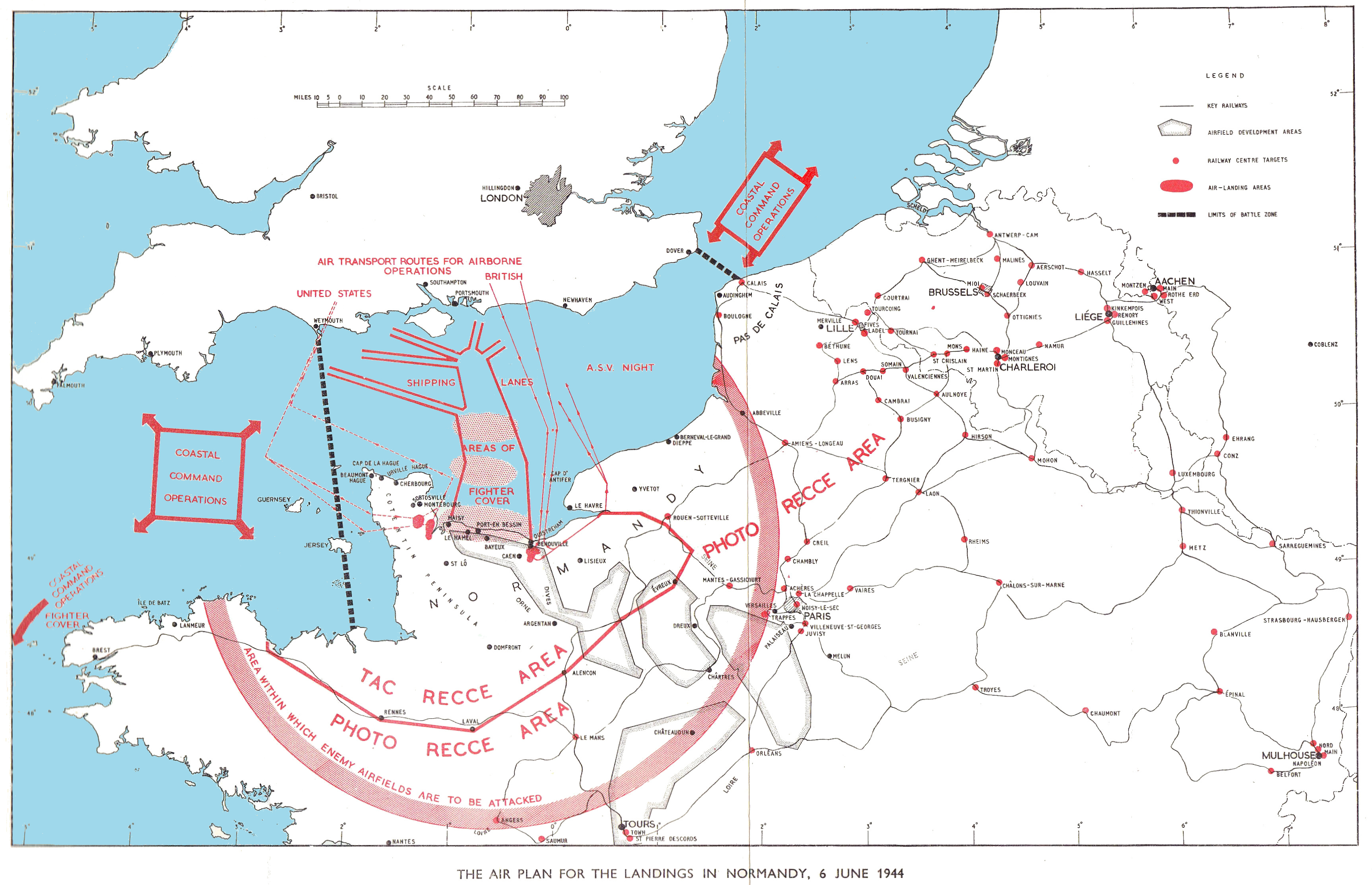
Air plan for the Allied landing in Normandy

The Allied Expeditionary Air Force flew over 3,200 photo-reconnaissance sorties from April 1944 until 6 June 1944. Photos of the coastline were taken at extremely low altitude to show the invaders the terrain, obstacles on the beach, and defensive structures such as bunkers and gun emplacements. To conceal the location of the invasion, sorties were flown along all European coastline. Inland terrain, bridges, troop emplacements, and buildings were also photographed, in many cases from several angles. Members of Combined Operations Pilotage Parties clandestinely prepared detailed harbour maps, including depth soundings. An appeal for holiday pictures and postcards of Europe announced on the BBC produced over ten million items, some of which proved useful. The French resistance provided details on Axis troop movements and on construction techniques used by the Germans for bunkers and other defensive installations.

Many German radio messages were encoded using the Enigma machine and other enciphering techniques and the codes were changed frequently. A team of code breakers stationed at Bletchley Park worked to break codes as quickly as possible to provide advance information on German plans and troop movements. British military intelligence code-named this information Ultra intelligence as it could only be provided to the most senior commanders. The Enigma code used by Field Marshal Gerd von Rundstedt, Oberbefehlshaber West (Supreme Commander West; OB West), commander of the Western Front, was broken by the end of March. German intelligence changed the Enigma codes after the Allied landings but by 17 June the Allies were again consistently able to read them.

=== Technology ===
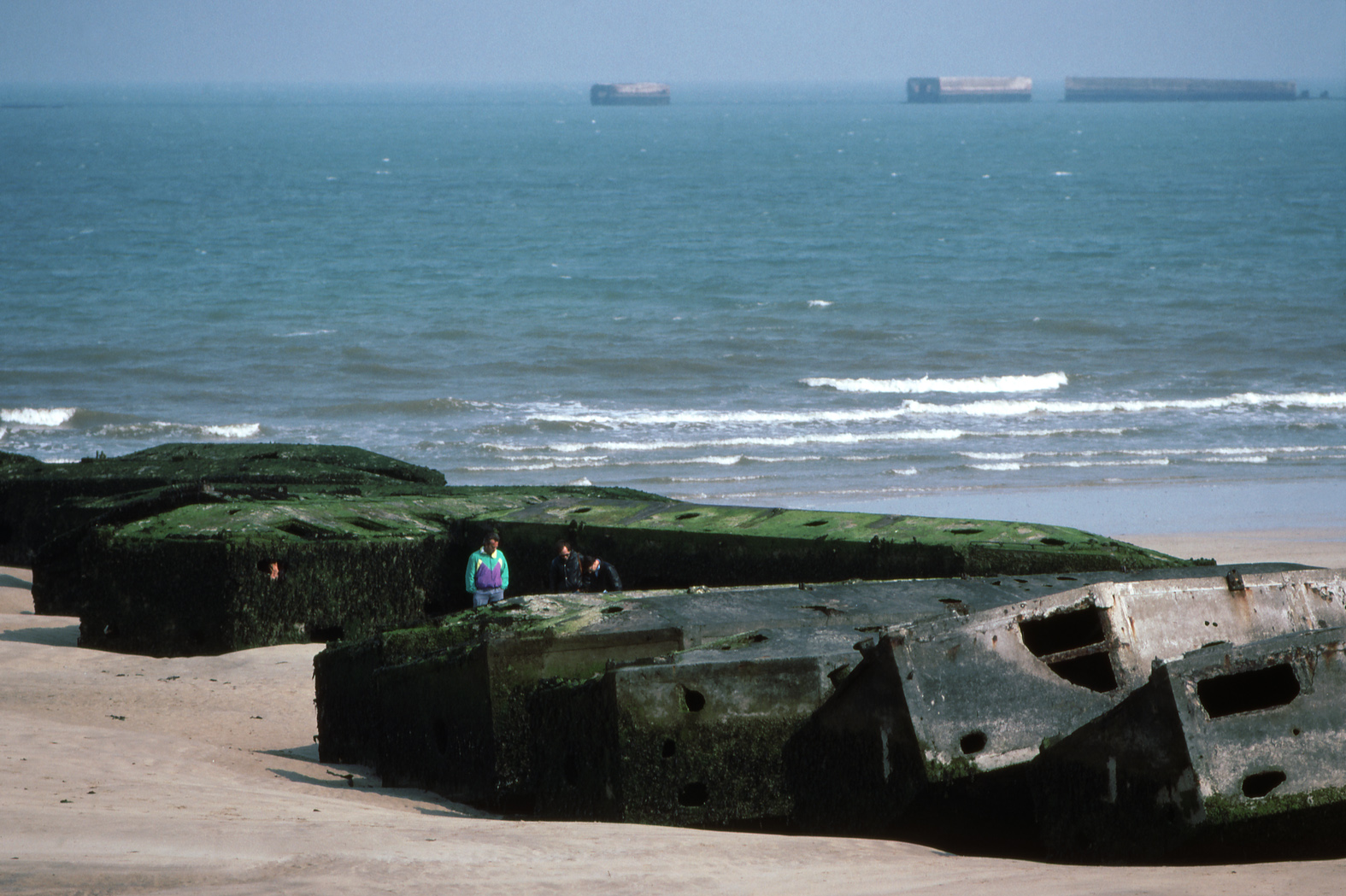
Remains of the concrete Mulberry harbour B (Gold) at Arromanches-les-Bains in Normandy, as seen out at sea and on the beach in 1990

After the disastrous Dieppe Raid in August 1942, the Allies developed new technologies for Overlord. To supplement the preliminary offshore bombardment and aerial assaults, some of the landing craft were equipped with artillery and anti-tank guns to provide close supporting fire. The Allies had decided not to immediately attack any of the heavily protected French ports and two artificial ports, called Mulberry harbours, were designed by COSSAC planners. Each assembly consisted of a floating outer breakwater, inner concrete caissons (called Phoenix breakwaters) and several floating piers. The Mulberry harbours were supplemented by blockship shelters (codenamed "Gooseberries"). With the expectation that fuel would be difficult or impossible to obtain on the continent, the Allies built a "Pipe-Line Under The Ocean" (PLUTO). Specially developed pipes 3 in (76 mm) in diameter were to be laid under the Channel from the Isle of Wight to Cherbourg by D-Day plus 18. Because of technical problems and the delay in capturing Cherbourg, the pipeline was not operational until 22 September. A second line was laid from Dungeness to Boulogne in late October.

The British built specialised tanks, nicknamed Hobart's Funnies, to deal with conditions expected during the Normandy campaign. Developed under the supervision of Major-General Percy Hobart, these were modified M4 Sherman and Churchill tanks. Examples include the Sherman Crab tank (equipped with a mine flail), the Churchill Crocodile (a flame-throwing tank), and the Armoured Ramp Carrier, which other tanks could use as a bridge to scale sea-walls or to overcome other obstacles. In some areas, the beaches consisted of a soft clay that could not support the weight of tanks. The Bobbin tank unrolled matting over the soft surface, leaving it behind as a route for ordinary tanks. The Assault Vehicle Royal Engineers (AVRE) was a Churchill tank modified for many combat engineering tasks, including laying bridges; it was armed with a demolition gun that could fire large charges into pillboxes. The Duplex-Drive tank (DD tank), another design developed by Hobart's group, was a self-propelled amphibious tank kept afloat using a waterproof canvas screen inflated with compressed air. These tanks were easily swamped and, on D-Day, many sank before reaching the shore, especially at Omaha.

=== Deception ===
In the months leading up to the invasion, the Allies conducted Operation Bodyguard, the overall strategy designed to mislead the Germans as to the date and location of the main Allied landings. Operation Fortitude included Fortitude North, a misinformation campaign using fake radio-traffic to lead the Germans into expecting an attack on Norway, and Fortitude South, a major deception designed to fool the Germans into believing that the landings would take place at Pas-de-Calais in July. A fictitious First U.S. Army Group was invented, supposedly located in Kent and Sussex under the command of Lieutenant General George S. Patton. The Allies constructed dummy inflatable tanks, trucks, and landing craft, and positioned them near the coast. Several military units, including II Canadian Corps and 2nd Canadian Division, moved into the area to bolster the illusion that a large force was gathering there. As well as the broadcast of fake radio-traffic, genuine radio messages from 21st Army Group were first routed to Kent via landline and then broadcast, to give the Germans the impression that most of the Allied troops were stationed there. Patton remained stationed in England until 6 July, thus continuing to deceive the Germans into believing a second attack would take place at Calais. Military and civilian personnel alike were aware of the need for secrecy, and the invasion troops were as much as possible kept isolated, especially in the period immediately before the invasion. American general Henry J. F. Miller was sent back to the United States in disgrace after revealing the invasion date at a party.

The Germans thought they had an extensive network of spies operating in the UK, but in fact, all their agents had been captured, and some had become double agents working for the Allies as part of the Double-Cross System. The double agent Juan Pujol García, a Spanish opponent of the Nazis known by the code name "Garbo", developed over the two years leading up to D-Day a fake network of informants that the Germans believed were collecting intelligence on their behalf. In the months preceding D-Day, Pujol sent hundreds of messages to his superiors in Madrid, messages specially prepared by the British intelligence service to convince the Germans that the attack would come in July at Calais.

Many of the German radar stations on the French coast were destroyed by the RAF in preparation for the landings. On the night before the invasion, in Operation Taxable, 617 Squadron (the famous "Dambusters") dropped strips of "window", metal foil that German radar operators interpreted as a naval convoy approaching Cap d'Antifer (about 80 km (50 mi) from the actual D-Day landings). The illusion was bolstered by a group of small vessels towing barrage balloons. No. 218 Squadron RAF also dropped "window" near Boulogne-sur-Mer in Operation Glimmer. On the same night, a small group of Special Air Service (SAS) operators deployed dummy paratroopers over Le Havre and Isigny. These dummies led the Germans to believe an additional airborne assault had occurred.

=== Rehearsals and security ===
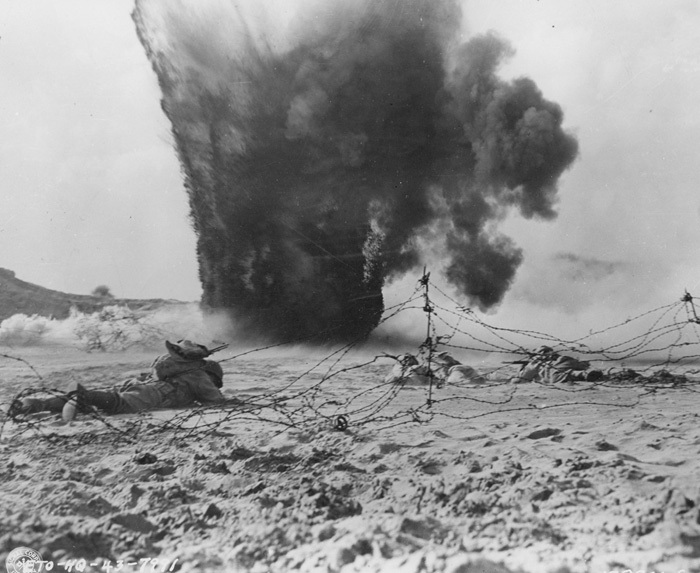
Training exercise with live ammunition

Training exercises for the Overlord landings took place as early as July 1943. As the nearby beach resembled the planned Normandy landing-site, the town of Slapton in Devon was evacuated in December 1943 and taken over by the armed forces as a site for training exercises, which included the use of landing craft and the management of beach obstacles. A friendly fire incident there on 27 April 1944 resulted in as many as 450 deaths. The following day, an additional estimated 749 American soldiers and sailors died when German torpedo-boats surprised members of Assault Force "U" conducting Exercise Tiger. Exercises with landing craft and live ammunition also took place at the Combined Training Centre in Inveraray in Scotland. Naval exercises took place in Northern Ireland, and medical teams in London and elsewhere rehearsed how they would handle the expected waves of casualties. Paratroopers conducted exercises, including a huge demonstration drop on 23 March 1944 observed by Churchill, Eisenhower, and other top officials.

Allied planners considered tactical surprise to be a necessary element of the plan for the landings. Information on the exact date and location of the landings was provided only to the topmost levels of the armed forces. Men were sealed into their marshalling areas at the end of May, with no further communication with the outside world. Troops were briefed using maps that were correct in every detail except for the place names, and most were not told their actual destination until they were already at sea. A news blackout in Britain increased the effectiveness of the deception operations. Travel to and from the Republic of Ireland was banned, and movement within several kilometres of the coast of England restricted.

=== Weather forecasting ===
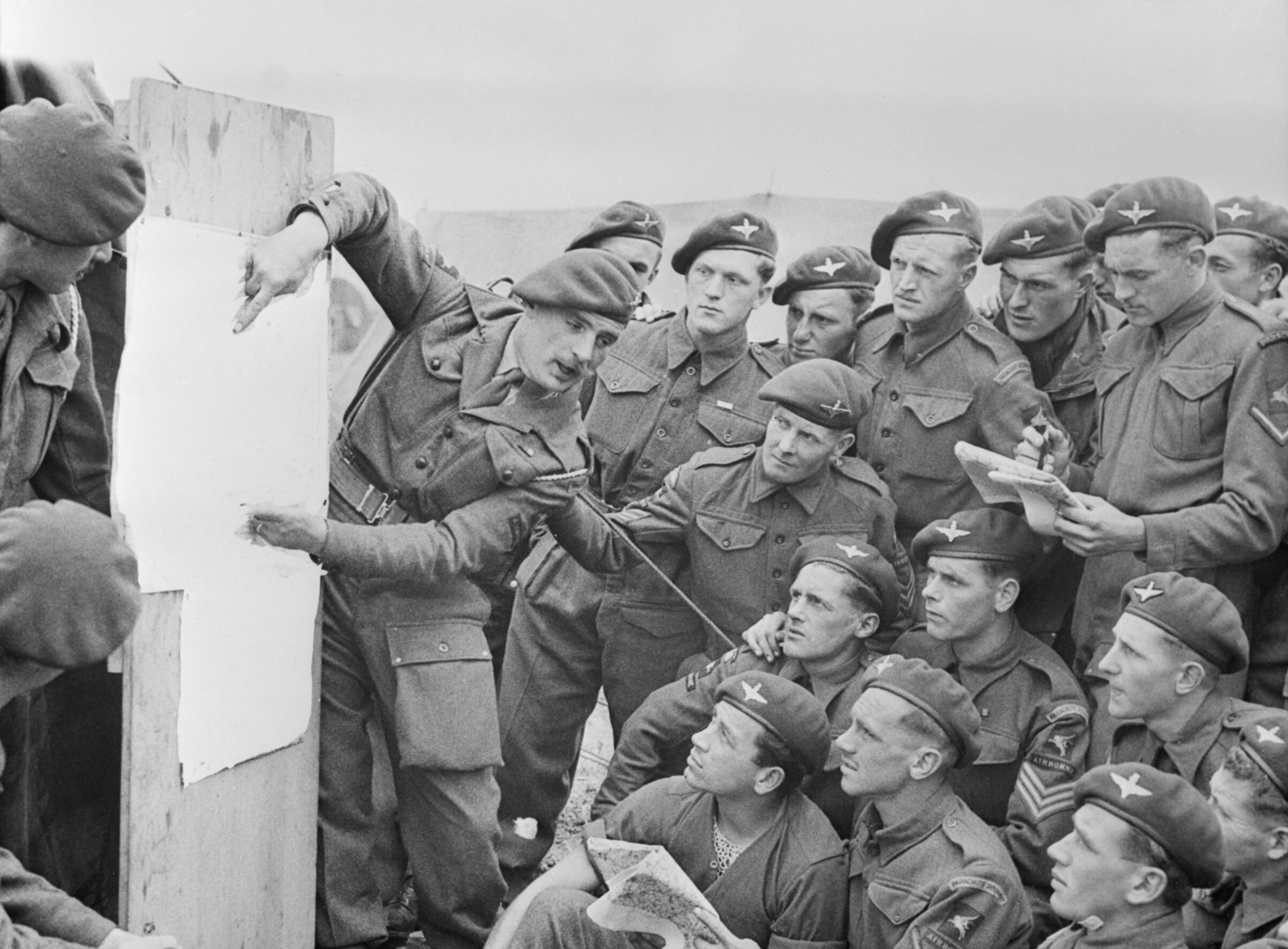
Men of the British 22nd Independent Parachute Company, 6th Airborne Division being briefed for the invasion, 4–5 June 1944

The invasion planners specified a set of conditions regarding the timing of the invasion, deeming only a few days in each month suitable. A full moon was desirable, as it would provide illumination for aircraft pilots and coincide with the highest tides. The Allies wanted to schedule the landings shortly before dawn, midway between low and high tide, with the tide coming in. This would improve the visibility of obstacles the enemy had placed on the beach while minimising the time the men would be exposed in the open. Criteria were also specified for wind speed, visibility, and cloud cover. Eisenhower had tentatively selected 5 June as the date for the assault; however, on 4 June, high winds and heavy seas made it impossible to launch landing craft, and low clouds would prevent aircraft from finding their targets.

By the evening of 4 June, the Allied meteorological team, headed by Group Captain James Stagg of the Royal Air Force, predicted that the weather would improve sufficiently for the invasion to go ahead on 6 June. Stagg met Eisenhower and other senior commanders at their headquarters at Southwick House in Hampshire to discuss the situation. General Montgomery and Major-General Walter Bedell Smith, Eisenhower's chief of staff, were eager to launch the invasion. Admiral Bertram Ramsay was prepared to commit his ships, while Air Chief Marshal Trafford Leigh-Mallory expressed concern that the conditions would be unfavourable for Allied aircraft. After much discussion, Eisenhower decided that the invasion should go ahead. Because the Allies controlled the Atlantic, German meteorologists had less information on incoming weather patterns. As the Luftwaffe meteorological centre in Paris predicted two weeks of stormy weather, many Wehrmacht commanders left their posts to attend war games in Rennes, and men in many units were given leave. Marshal Erwin Rommel returned to Germany for his wife's birthday and to petition Hitler for more tanks.

Had Eisenhower postponed the invasion again, the next available period with the right combination of tides (but without the desirable full moon) would have been two weeks later, from 18 to 20 June. As it happened, during this period the invaders would have encountered a major storm lasting four days, between 19 and 22 June, which would have prevented the initial landings.

=== German preparations and defences ===
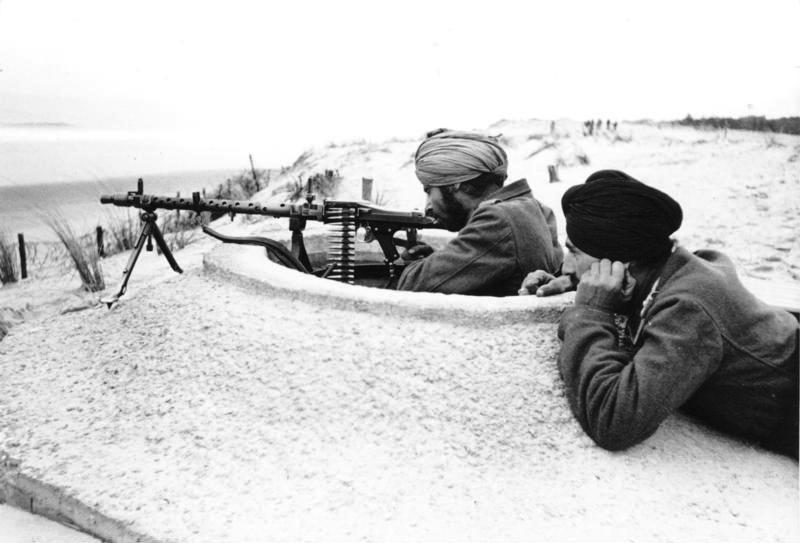
German troops of the Indian Legion on the Atlantic Wall in France, 21 March 1944

Nazi Germany had 50 divisions in France and the Low Countries and another 18 stationed in Denmark and Norway. (Note: As of November 1943. There were also 206 German divisions on the Eastern Front, 24 in the Balkans, and 22 in Italy.) Fifteen divisions were in the process of formation in Germany, but there was no strategic reserve. The Calais region was defended by the 15th Army under Generaloberst (Colonel General) Hans von Salmuth, and Normandy by the 7th Army commanded by Generaloberst Friedrich Dollmann. Combat losses throughout the war, particularly on the Eastern Front, had depleted the pool of able young men, so that German soldiers were now on average six years older than their Allied counterparts. Many in the Normandy area were Ostlegionen (eastern legions) conscripts and "volunteers" from Turkestan, Russia, Mongolia, and elsewhere. The Wehrmacht had provided them mainly with unreliable captured equipment; they lacked motorised transport. Formations that arrived later, such as the 12th SS Panzer Division Hitlerjugend, were, for the most part, younger and far better equipped and trained than the static troops stationed along the coast.

In early 1944, OB West was significantly weakened by personnel and materiel transfers to the Eastern Front. During the Soviet Dnieper–Carpathian Offensive (24 December 1943 – 17 April 1944), the German High Command was forced to transfer the entire II SS Panzer Corps from France, consisting of the 9th and 10th SS Panzer Divisions, as well as the 349th Infantry Division, 507th Heavy Panzer Battalion and the 311th and 322nd StuG Assault Gun Brigades. All told, the German forces stationed in France were deprived of 45,827 troops and 363 tanks, assault guns, and self-propelled anti-tank guns. It was the first major transfer of forces from France to the east since the creation of Führer Directive 51, which no longer allowed any transfers from the west to the east. There were also transfers to the Italian front: von Rundstedt complained that many of his best units had been sent on a "fool's errand" to Italy, saying it was "madness ... that frightful boot of a country should have been evacuated ... we should have held a decent front with a few divisions on the Alpine frontier."

The 1st SS Panzer Division Leibstandarte SS Adolf Hitler, 9th, 11th, 19th and 116th Panzer divisions, alongside the 2nd SS Panzer Division "Das Reich", had only arrived in March–May 1944 to France for extensive refit after being badly damaged during the Dnieper-Carpathian Offensive. Seven of the eleven panzer or panzergrenadier divisions stationed in France were still not fully operational or only partially mobile in early June 1944.

==== Atlantic Wall ====
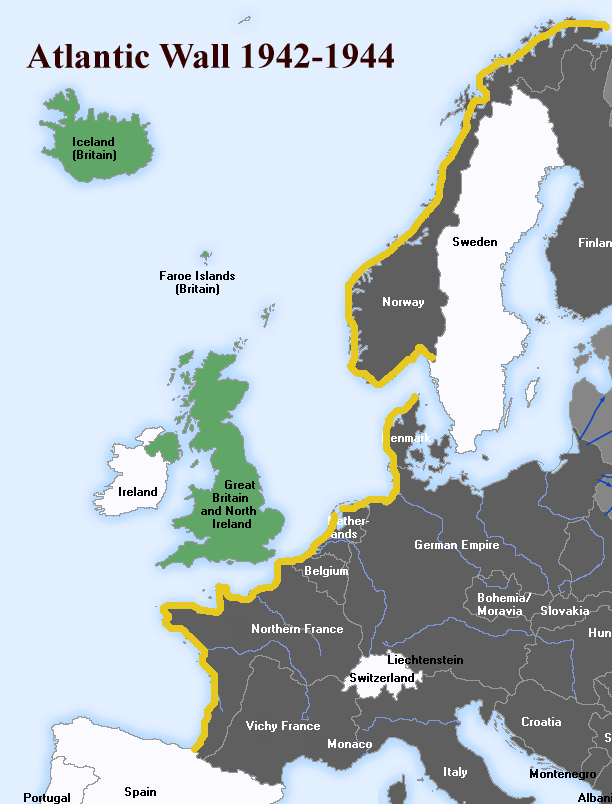
Atlantic Wall

Alarmed by the raids on St Nazaire and Dieppe in 1942, Hitler ordered the construction of fortifications all along the Atlantic coast, from Spain to Norway, to protect against an expected Allied invasion. He envisioned 15,000 emplacements manned by 300,000 troops, but due to shortages, particularly of concrete and manpower, most of the strongpoints were never built. As the expected site of an Allied invasion, Pas-de-Calais was heavily defended. In the Normandy area the best fortifications were concentrated at the port facilities at Cherbourg and Saint-Malo.

A report by Rundstedt to Hitler in October 1943 regarding the weak defences in France led to the appointment of Rommel to oversee the construction of further fortifications along the expected invasion-front, which stretched from the Netherlands to Cherbourg. Rommel was given command of the newly re-formed Army Group B, which included the 7th Army, the 15th Army, and the forces guarding the Netherlands. Nazi Germany's tangled command structure made it difficult for Rommel to achieve his task. He was not allowed to give orders to the Organisation Todt, which was commanded by armaments minister Albert Speer, so in some places he had to assign soldiers to do construction work.

Rommel believed that the Normandy coast could be a possible landing point for the invasion, so he ordered the construction of extensive defensive works along that shore. In addition to concrete gun-emplacements at strategic points along the coast, he ordered wooden stakes, metal tripods, mines, and large anti-tank obstacles to be placed on the beach to delay the approach of landing craft and to impede the movement of tanks. Expecting the Allies to land at high tide so that the infantry would spend less time exposed on the beach, he ordered many of these obstacles to be placed at the high-tide mark. Tangles of barbed wire, booby traps, and the removal of ground cover made the approach hazardous for infantry. On Rommel's order, the number of mines along the coast was tripled. Given the Allied air supremacy (4,029 Allied aircraft assigned to operations in Normandy plus 5,514 aircraft assigned to bombing and defence, versus 570 Luftwaffe planes stationed in France and the Low Countries), booby-trapped stakes known as Rommelspargel (Rommel's asparagus) were set up in meadows and fields to deter airborne landings.

==== Mobile reserves ====
Rommel, believing that the Germans' best chance was to stop the invasion at the shore, requested that mobile reserves—especially tanks—be stationed as close to the coast as possible. Rundstedt, General Leo Geyr von Schweppenburg (commander of Panzer Group West), and other senior commanders believed that the invasion could not be stopped on the beaches. Geyr argued for a conventional doctrine: keeping the Panzer formations concentrated in a central position around Paris and Rouen and deploying them only when the main Allied beachhead had been identified. Geyr also noted that in the Italian Campaign the armour stationed near the coast had been damaged by naval bombardment. Rommel's opinion was that because of the overwhelming Allied air superiority, large-scale movement of tanks would not be possible once the invasion was underway. Hitler made the final decision: he left three divisions under Geyr's command and gave Rommel operational control of three tank-divisions as reserves. Hitler took personal control of four divisions as strategic reserves, not to be used without his direct orders.

== Invasion ==
General Eisenhower's D-Day Invasion orders, presented in a 21st-century video by the U.S. Army

You are about to embark upon the Great Crusade, toward which we have striven these many months. The eyes of the world are upon you. The hopes and prayers of liberty-loving people everywhere march with you. In company with our brave Allies and brothers-in-arms on other Fronts, you will bring about the destruction of the German war machine, the elimination of Nazi tyranny over the oppressed peoples of Europe, and security for ourselves in a free world.

— Eisenhower, Letter to Allied Forces

By May 1944, 1.5 million American troops had arrived in the United Kingdom. Most were housed in temporary camps in the south-west of England, ready to move across the Channel to the western section of the landing zone. British and Canadian troops were billeted in accommodation further east, spread from Southampton to Newhaven, and even on the east coast for men who would be coming across in later waves. A complex system called Movement Control assured that the men and vehicles left on schedule from twenty departure points. Some men had to board their craft nearly a week before departure. The ships met at a rendezvous point (nicknamed "Piccadilly Circus") south-east of the Isle of Wight to assemble into convoys to cross the Channel. Minesweepers began clearing lanes on the evening of 5 June, and a thousand bombers left before dawn to attack the coastal defences. Some 1,200 aircraft departed England just before midnight to transport three airborne divisions to their drop zones behind enemy lines several hours before the beach landings. The American 82nd and 101st Airborne Divisions were assigned objectives on the Cotentin Peninsula west of Utah. The British 6th Airborne Division was assigned to capture intact the bridges over the Caen Canal and River Orne. The Free French 4th SAS battalion of 538 men was assigned objectives in Brittany (Operation Dingson, Operation Samwest). Some 132,000 men were transported by sea on D-Day, and a further 24,000 came by air. Preliminary naval bombardment commenced at 05:45 and continued until 06:25 from five battleships, twenty cruisers, sixty-five destroyers, and two monitors. Infantry began arriving on the beaches at around 06:30.

=== Beaches ===
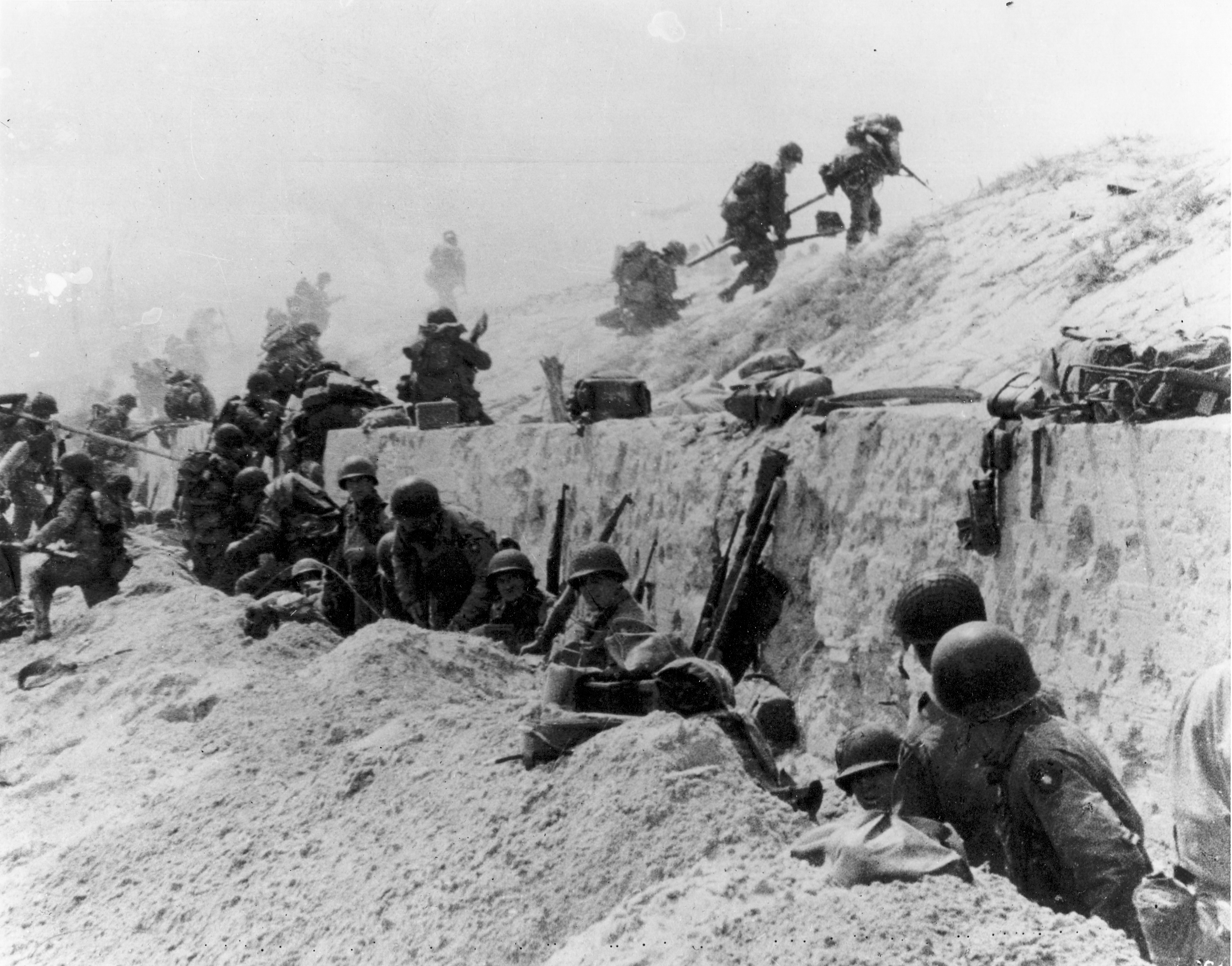
U.S. soldiers of the 8th Infantry, 4th Infantry Division advance over the sea-wall at Utah.

The craft bearing the U.S. 4th Infantry Division assaulting Utah were pushed by the current to a spot about 1,800 metres (2,000 yd) south of their intended landing zone. The troops met light resistance, suffering fewer than 200 casualties. Their efforts to push inland fell far short of their targets for the first day, but they were able to advance about 6.5 kilometres (4 mi), making contact with the 101st Airborne Division. The airborne landings west of Utah were not very successful, as only ten per cent of the paratroopers landed in their drop zones. Gathering the men together into fighting units was made difficult by a shortage of radios and by the terrain, with its hedgerows, stone walls and marshes. The 82nd Airborne Division captured its primary objective at Sainte-Mère-Église and worked to protect the western flank. Its failure to capture the river crossings at the River Merderet resulted in a delay in sealing off the Cotentin Peninsula. The 101st Airborne Division helped protect the southern flank and captured the lock on the River Douve at La Barquette, but did not capture the assigned nearby bridges on the first day.

At Pointe du Hoc, the task for the two hundred men of the 2nd Ranger Battalion, commanded by Lieutenant Colonel James Rudder, was to scale the 30-metre (100 ft) cliffs with ropes and ladders to destroy the gun battery located there. While under fire from above, the men scaled the cliff, only to discover that the guns had already been withdrawn. The Rangers located the weapons, unguarded but ready to use, in an orchard some 550 metres (600 yd) south of the point, and disabled them. Under attack, the men at the point became isolated, and some were captured. By dawn on D+1 (7 June), Rudder had only 90 men able to fight. Relief did not come until D+2 (8 June), when members of the 743rd Tank Battalion arrived.

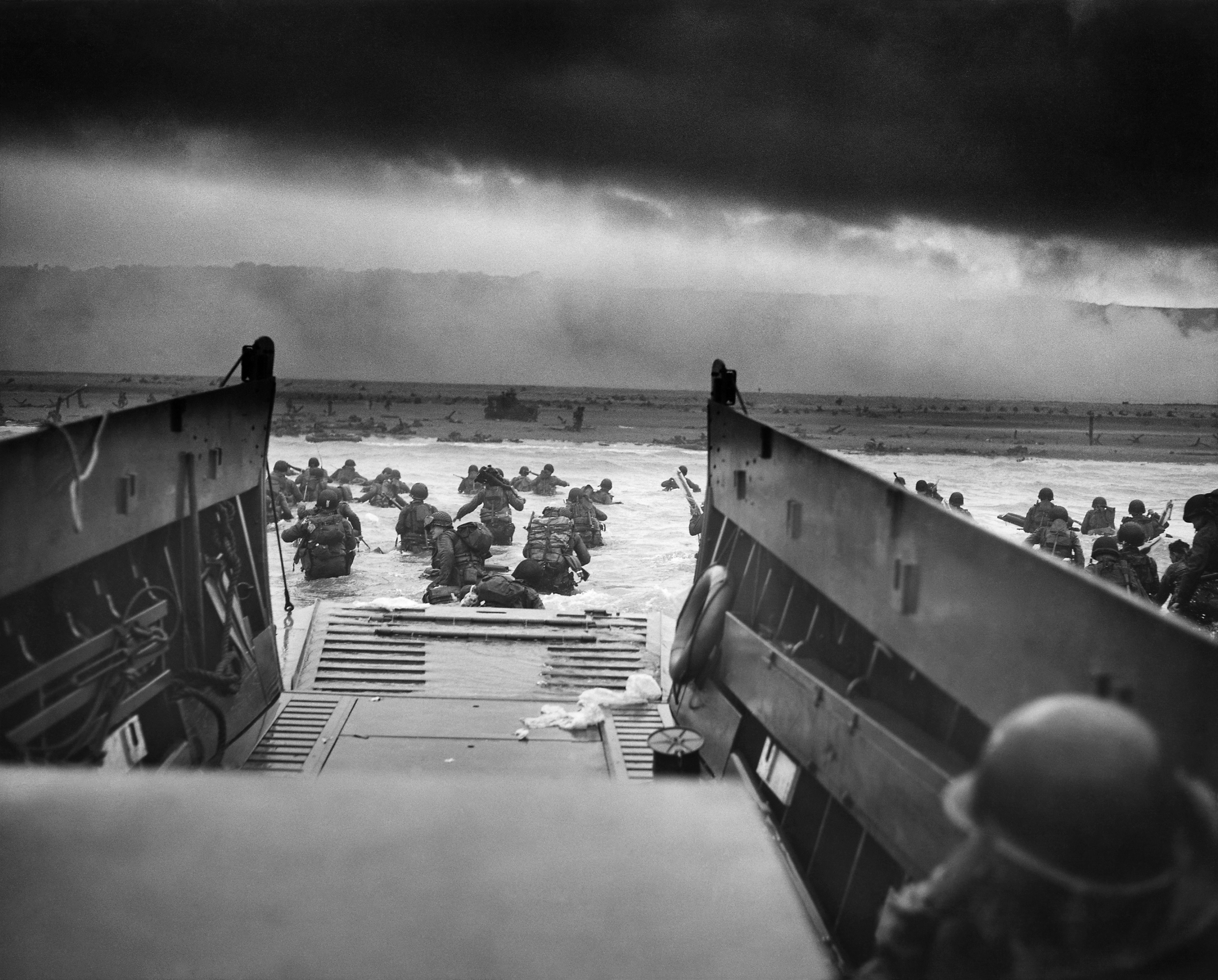
The photograph Into the Jaws of Death shows American troops of Company E of the 16th Infantry Regiment, part of the U.S. 1st Infantry Division, leaving a Higgins Boat on Omaha.

Omaha, the most heavily defended sector, was assigned to the U.S. 1st Infantry Division, supplemented by troops from the U.S. 29th Infantry Division. They faced the 352nd Infantry Division, rather than the expected single regiment. Strong currents forced many landing craft east of their intended position or delayed them. Casualties were heavier than all the other landings combined, as the men were subjected to fire from the cliffs above. Problems clearing the beach of obstructions led to the beachmaster calling a halt to further landings of vehicles at 08:30. A group of destroyers arrived around this time to offer naval gunfire support. Exit from Omaha was possible only via five gullies, and by late morning barely six hundred men had reached the higher ground. By noon, as the artillery fire took its toll and the Germans started to run out of ammunition, the Americans were able to clear some lanes on the beaches. They also started clearing the draws of enemy defences so that vehicles could move off the beach. The tenuous beachhead was expanded over the following days, and the D-Day objectives were accomplished by D+3 (9 June).

At Gold, high winds made conditions difficult for the landing craft, and the amphibious DD tanks were landed close to shore or directly on the beach instead of further out as planned. Aerial attacks had failed to hit the Le Hamel strongpoint, and its 75 mm (2.95 in) gun continued to do damage until 16:00. On the western flank, the 1st Battalion, Hampshire Regiment captured Arromanches (future site of Mulberry "B"), and contact was made on the eastern flank with the Canadian forces at Juno.

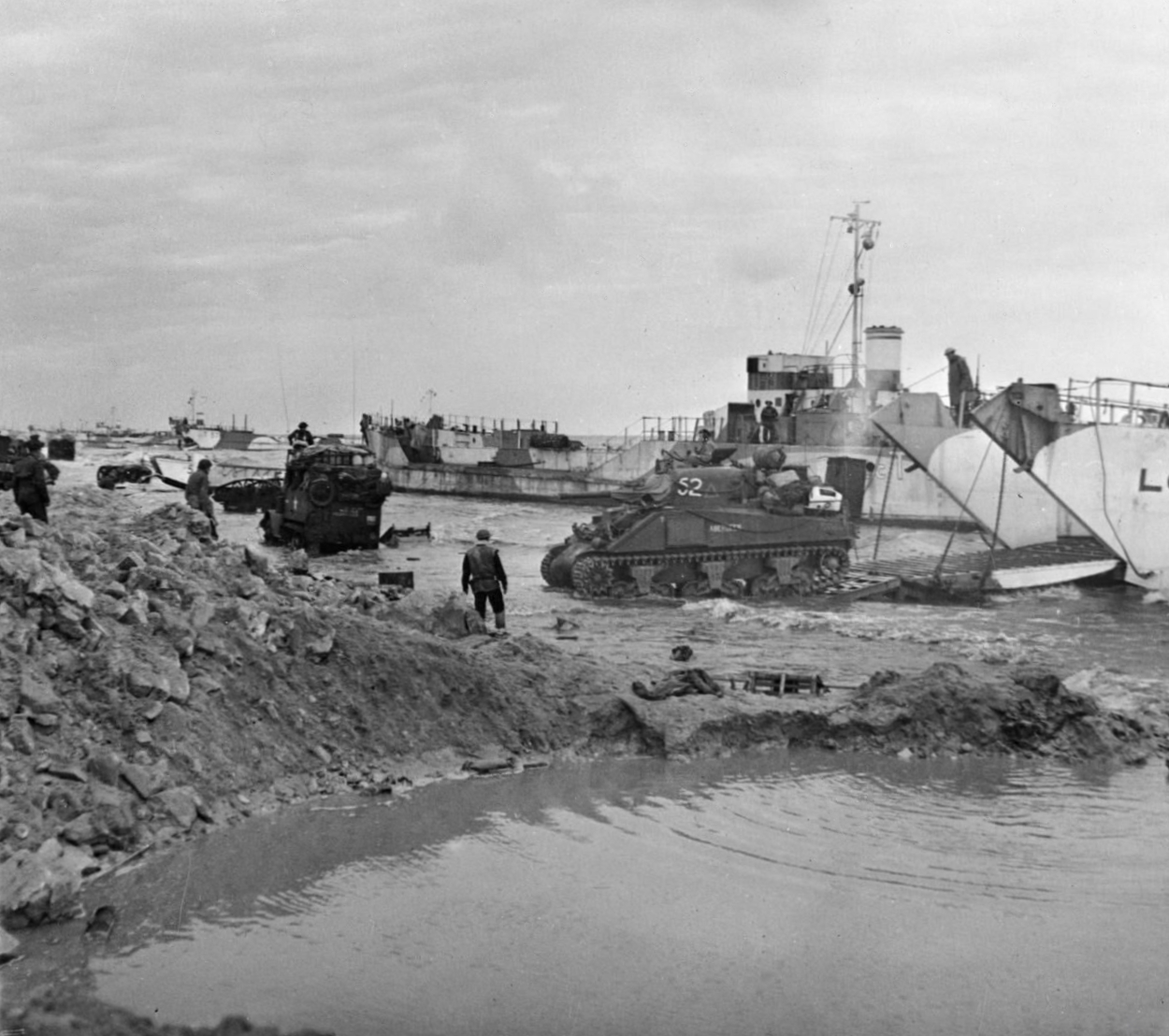
Gold Beach on 7 June 1944

Landings of infantry at Juno were delayed because of rough seas, and the men arrived ahead of their supporting armour, suffering many casualties while disembarking. Most of the offshore bombardment had missed the German defences. In spite of these difficulties, the Canadians quickly cleared the beach and created two exits to the villages above. Delays in taking Bény-sur-Mer led to congestion on the beach, but by nightfall, the contiguous Juno and Gold beachheads covered an area 19 kilometres (12 mi) wide and 10 kilometres (7 mi) deep. One troop of the 1st Hussar Tank Regiment was the only Allied unit to achieve its objective on the first day of the invasion. Casualties at Juno were 961 men.

On Sword, 21 of 25 DD tanks succeeded in getting safely ashore to provide cover for the infantry, who began disembarking at 07:30. They quickly cleared the beach and created several exits for the tanks. In the windy conditions, the tide came in more quickly than expected, making manoeuvring the armour difficult. The 2nd Battalion, King's Shropshire Light Infantry advanced on foot to within a few kilometres of Caen, but had to withdraw due to lack of armour support. At 16:00, the German 21st Panzer Division mounted a counterattack between Sword and Juno and nearly succeeded in reaching the coast. They met stiff resistance from the British 3rd Infantry Division and were soon recalled to assist in the area between Caen and Bayeux.

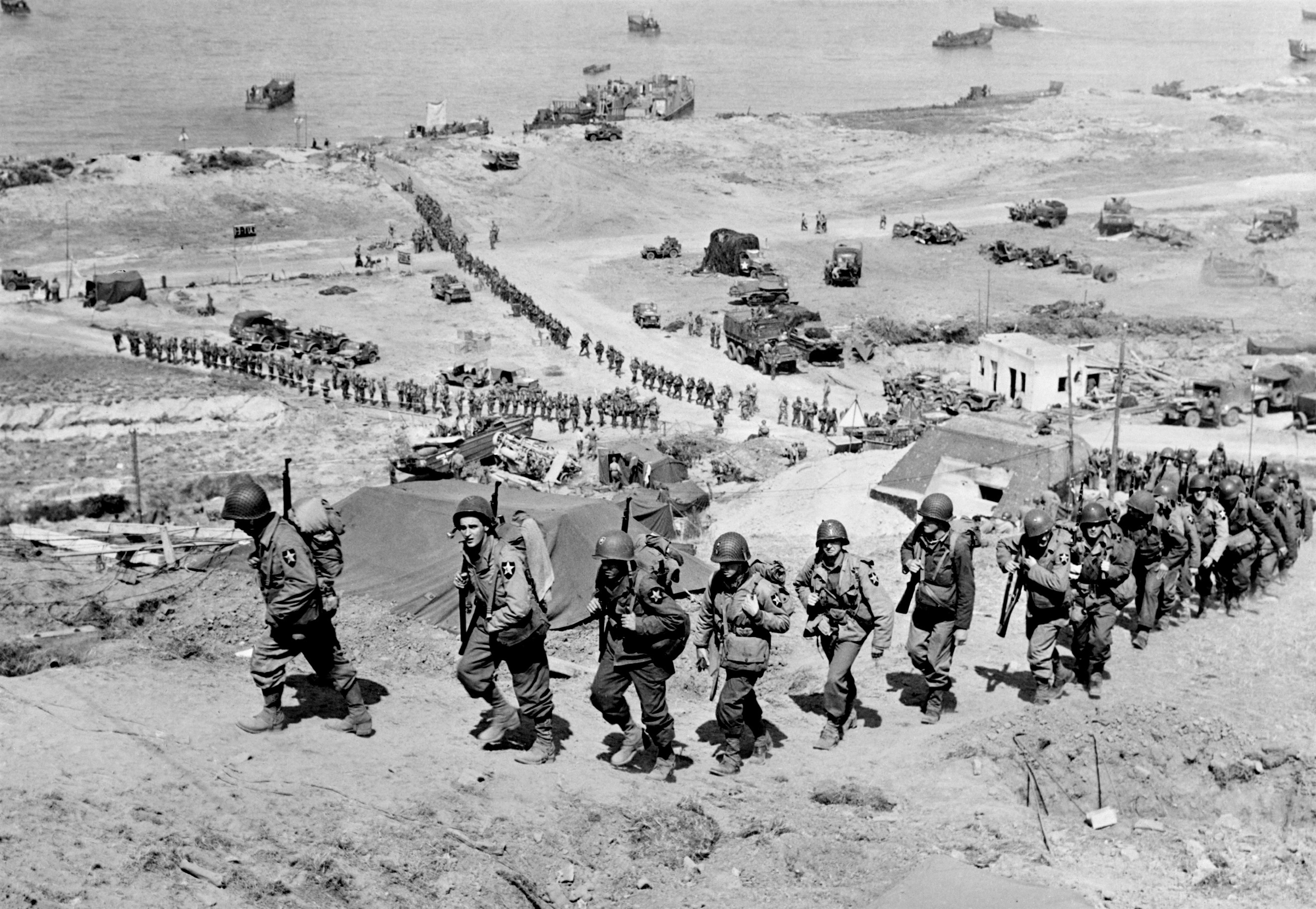
The build-up at Omaha Beach: U.S. 2nd Infantry Division troops and equipment moving inland toward Saint-Laurent-sur-Mer on D+1, 7 June 1944.

The first components of the artificial Mulberry harbours were brought across on D+1 (7 June) and the structures were in use for unloading by mid-June. One was constructed at Arromanches by the British, the other at Omaha by the Americans. Severe storms on 19 June interrupted the landing of supplies and destroyed the Omaha harbour. The repaired Arromanches harbour was able to receive around 6,000 tons of materiel daily and was in continuous use for the next ten months, but most shipments were brought in over the beaches until the port of Cherbourg was cleared of mines and obstructions on 16 July.

Allied casualties on the first day were at least 10,000, with 4,414 confirmed dead. The Germans lost 1,000 men. The Allied invasion plans had called for the capture of Carentan, St. Lô, Caen, and Bayeux on the first day, with all the beaches (other than Utah), linked with a front line 10 to 16 kilometres (6 to 10 mi) from the beaches; none of these objectives were achieved. The five bridgeheads were not connected until 12 June, by which time the Allies held a front around 97 kilometres (60 mi) long and 24 kilometres (15 mi) deep. Caen, a major objective, was still in German hands at the end of D-Day and would not be completely captured until 21 July. Nearly 160,000 troops crossed the English Channel on 6 June, and more than two million Allied troops were in France by the end of August.

=== Cherbourg ===
In the western part of the lodgement, US troops were to occupy the Cotentin Peninsula, especially Cherbourg, which would provide the Allies with a deep water harbour. The terrain behind Utah and Omaha was characterised by bocage, with thorny hedgerows on embankments 0.9 to 1.2 metres (3 to 4 ft) high with a ditch on either side. Many areas were additionally protected by rifle pits and machine-gun emplacements. Most of the roads were too narrow for tanks. The Germans had flooded the fields behind Utah with sea water for up to 3 kilometres (2 mi) from the coast. German forces on the peninsula included the 91st Infantry Division and the 243rd and 709th Static Infantry Divisions. By D+3 the Allied commanders realised that Cherbourg would not quickly be taken, and decided to cut off the peninsula to prevent any further reinforcements from being brought in. After failed attempts by the inexperienced 90th Infantry Division, Major General J. Lawton Collins, the VII Corps commander, assigned the veteran 9th Infantry Division to the task. They reached the west coast of the Cotentin on 17 June, cutting off Cherbourg. The 9th Division, joined by the 4th and 79th Infantry Divisions, took control of the peninsula in fierce fighting from 19 June; Cherbourg was captured on 26 June. By this time, the Germans had destroyed the port facilities, which were not brought back into full operation until September.

=== Caen ===
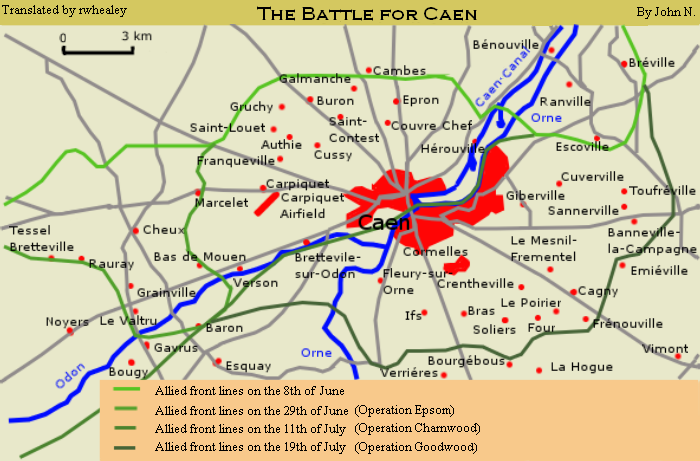
Operations in the Battle for Caen

Fighting in the Caen area versus the 21st Panzer, the 12th SS Panzer Division Hitlerjugend and other units soon reached a stalemate. During Operation Perch, XXX Corps attempted to advance south towards Mont Pinçon but soon abandoned the direct approach in favour of a pincer attack to encircle Caen. XXX Corps made a flanking move from Tilly-sur-Seulles towards Villers-Bocage with part of the 7th Armoured Division, while I Corps tried to pass Caen to the east. The attack by I Corps was quickly halted and XXX Corps briefly captured Villers-Bocage. Advanced elements of the British force were ambushed, initiating a day-long Battle of Villers-Bocage and then the Battle of the Box. The British were forced to withdraw to Tilly-sur-Seulles. After a delay because of storms from 17 to 23 June, Operation Epsom began on 26 June, an attempt by VIII Corps to swing around and attack Caen from the south-west and establish a bridgehead south of the Odon. Although the operation failed its objectives, the Germans suffered many tank losses after committing every available Panzer unit to the operation. Rundstedt was dismissed on 1 July and replaced as OB West by Field Marshal Günther von Kluge after remarking that the war was now lost. The northern suburbs of Caen were bombed on the evening of 7 July and then occupied north of the River Orne in Operation Charnwood on 8–9 July. Operation Atlantic and Operation Goodwood captured the rest of Caen and the high ground to the south from 18 to 21 July, by which time the city was nearly destroyed. Hitler survived an assassination attempt on 20 July.

=== Breakout from the beachhead ===
Map showing the breakout from the Normandy beachhead and the formation of the Falaise Pocket, August 1944

After securing territory in the Cotentin Peninsula south as far as Saint-Lô, the U.S. First Army launched Operation Cobra on 25 July and advanced further south to Avranches by 1 August. The British launched Operation Bluecoat on 30 July to secure Vire and the high ground of Mont Pinçon. Lieutenant General Patton's U.S. Third Army, activated on 1 August, quickly took most of Brittany and territory as far south as the Loire, while the First Army maintained pressure eastward toward Le Mans to protect their flank. By 3 August, Patton and the Third Army were able to leave a small force in Brittany and drive eastward towards the main concentration of German forces south of Caen. Over Kluge's objections, on 4 August Hitler ordered a counter-offensive (Operation Lüttich) from Vire towards Avranches.

While II Canadian Corps pushed south from Caen toward Falaise in Operation Totalise on 8 August, Bradley and Montgomery realised that there was an opportunity for the bulk of the German forces to be trapped at Falaise. The Third Army continued the encirclement from the south, reaching Alençon on 11 August. Although Hitler continued to insist until 14 August that his forces should counter-attack, Kluge and his officers began planning a retreat eastward. The German forces were severely hampered by Hitler's insistence on making all major decisions himself, which left his forces without orders for periods as long as 24 hours while information was sent back and forth to the Führer's residence at Obersalzberg in Bavaria. On the evening of 12 August, Patton asked Bradley if his forces should continue northward to close the gap and encircle the German forces. Bradley refused because Montgomery had already assigned the First Canadian Army to take the territory from the north. The Canadians met heavy resistance and captured Falaise on 16 August. The gap was closed on 21 August, trapping 50,000 German troops but more than a third of the German 7th Army and the remnants of nine of the eleven Panzer divisions had escaped to the east. Montgomery's decision-making regarding the Falaise Gap was criticised at the time by American commanders, especially Patton, although Bradley was more sympathetic and believed Patton would not have been able to close the gap. The issue has been the subject of much discussion among historians, criticism being levelled at American, British and Canadian forces. Hitler relieved Kluge of his command of OB West on 15 August and replaced him with Field Marshal Walter Model. Kluge committed suicide on 19 August after Hitler became aware of his involvement in the 20 July plot. An invasion in southern France (Operation Dragoon) was launched on 15 August.

The French Resistance in Paris rose against the Germans on 19 August. Eisenhower initially wanted to bypass the city to pursue other targets, but amid reports that the citizens were going hungry and Hitler's stated intention to destroy it, de Gaulle insisted that it should be taken immediately. French forces of the 2nd Armoured Division under General Philippe Leclerc arrived from the west on 24 August, while the U.S. 4th Infantry Division pressed up from the south. Scattered fighting continued throughout the night, and by the morning of 25 August Paris was liberated.

Operations continued in the British and Canadian sectors until the end of the month. On 25 August, the U.S. 2nd Armored Division fought its way into Elbeuf, making contact with British and Canadian armoured divisions. The 2nd Canadian Infantry Division advanced into the Forêt de la Londe on the morning of 27 August. The area was strongly held; the 4th and 6th Canadian brigades suffered many casualties over the course of three days as the Germans fought a delaying action in terrain well suited to defence. The Germans pulled back on 29 August, withdrawing over the Seine the next day. On the afternoon of 30 August, the 3rd Canadian Infantry Division crossed the Seine near Elbeuf and entered Rouen to a jubilant welcome.

== Campaign close ==
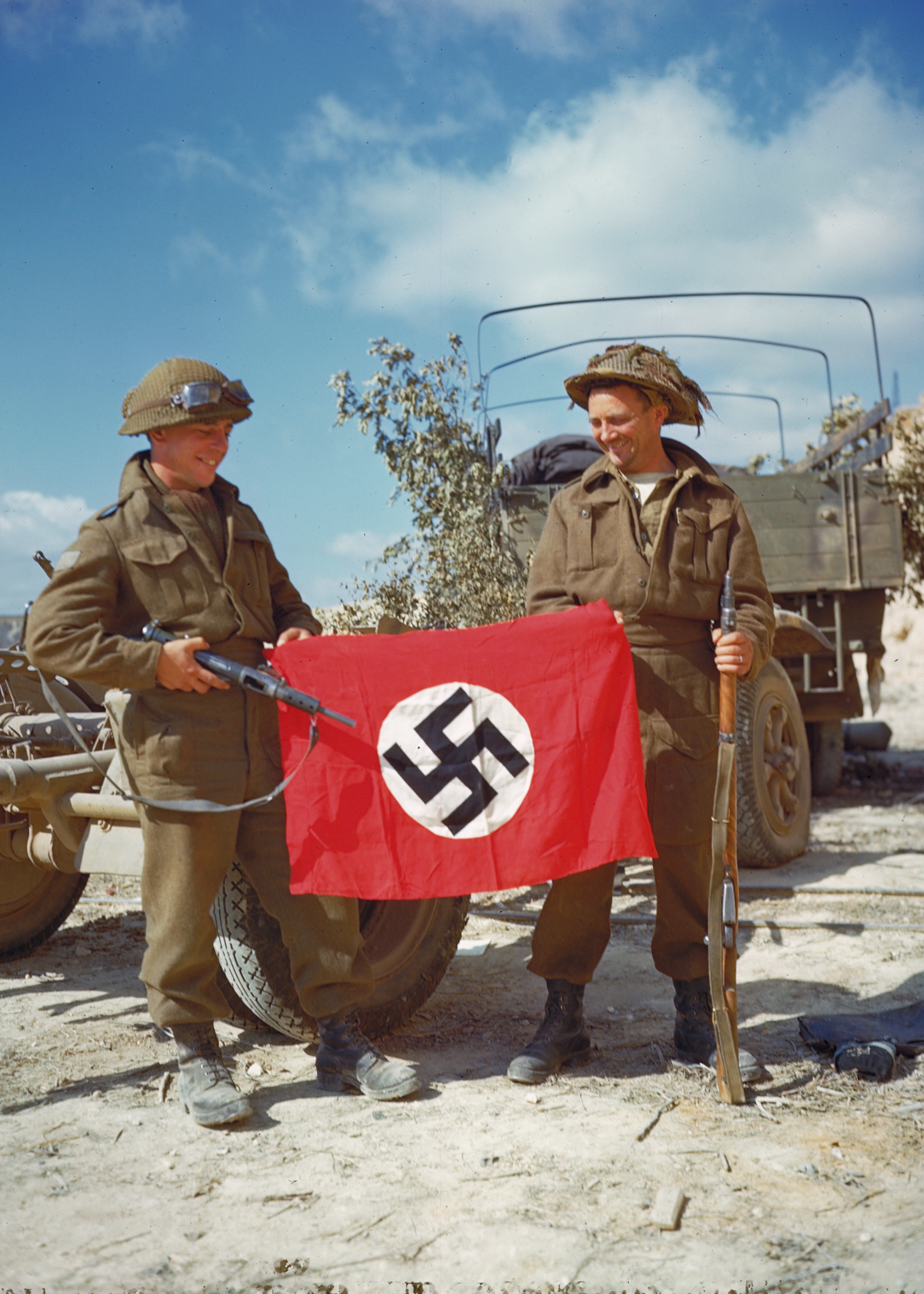
Canadian soldiers with a captured Nazi flag

Eisenhower took direct command of all Allied ground forces on 1 September. Concerned about German counter-attacks and the limited materiel arriving in France, he decided to continue operations on a broad front rather than attempting narrow thrusts. The linkup of the Normandy forces with the Allied forces in southern France occurred on 12 September as part of the drive to the Siegfried Line. In spite of Eisenhower's misgivings, on 17 September Montgomery launched Operation Market Garden, an unsuccessful attempt by Anglo-American airborne troops to capture bridges in the Netherlands to allow ground forces to cross the Rhine into Germany. The Allied advance slowed due to German resistance and the lack of supplies (especially fuel). On 16 December the Germans launched the Ardennes Offensive, also known as the Battle of the Bulge, the last major German offensive of the war on the Western Front. A series of successful Soviet actions began with the Vistula–Oder Offensive on 12 January. Hitler committed suicide on 30 April as Soviet troops neared his Führerbunker in Berlin, and Germany surrendered on 7 May 1945.

The Normandy landings were the largest seaborne invasion in history, with nearly 5,000 landing and assault craft, 289 escort vessels, and 277 minesweepers. The opening of another front in western Europe was a tremendous psychological blow for Germany's military, who feared a repetition of the two-front war of World War I. The Normandy landings also heralded the start of the "race for Europe" between the Soviet forces and the Western powers, which some historians consider to be the start of the Cold War.

Victory in Normandy stemmed from several factors. German preparations along the Atlantic Wall were only partially finished; shortly before D-Day Rommel reported that construction was only 18 per cent complete in some areas as resources were diverted elsewhere. The deceptions undertaken in Operation Fortitude were successful, leaving the Germans obliged to defend a huge stretch of coastline. The Allies achieved and maintained air superiority, which meant that the Germans were unable to make observations of the preparations underway in Britain and were unable to interfere via bomber attacks. Transport infrastructure in France was severely disrupted by Allied bombers and the French Resistance, making it difficult for the Germans to bring up reinforcements and supplies. Much of the opening artillery barrage was off-target or not concentrated enough to have any impact, but the specialised armour worked well except on Omaha, providing close artillery support for the troops as they disembarked onto the beaches. The indecisiveness and overly complicated command structure of the German high command was also a factor in the Allied success.

== Casualties ==
=== Allies ===
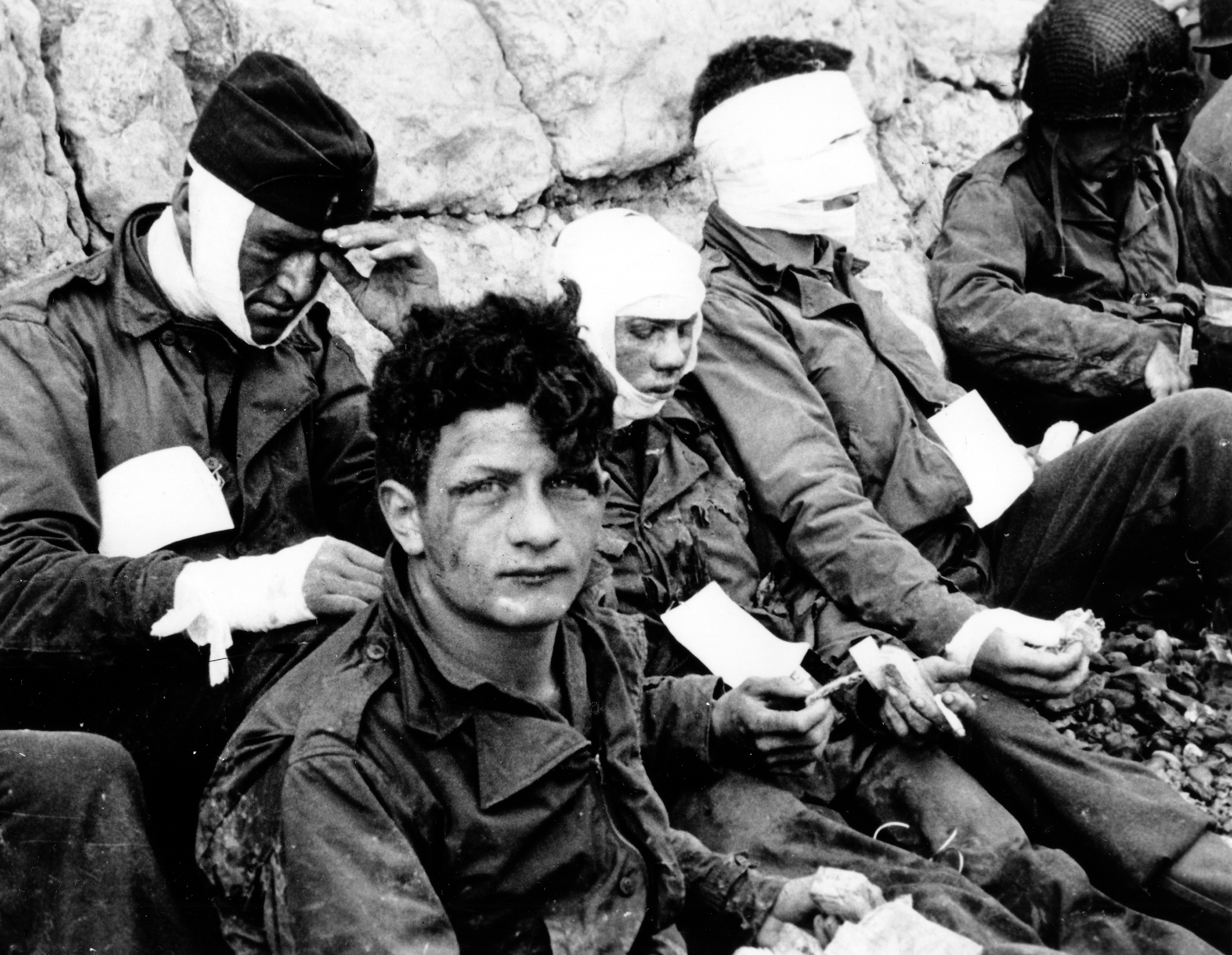
American assault troops injured while storming Omaha Beach

From D-Day to 21 August, the Allies landed 2,052,299 men in northern France. The cost of the Normandy campaign was high for both sides. Between 6 June and the end of August, the American armies suffered 124,394 casualties, of whom 20,668 were killed, and 10,128 were missing. Casualties within the First Canadian and Second British Armies are placed at 83,045: 15,995 killed, 57,996 wounded, and 9,054 missing. (Note: British casualties are sourced from "War Diary, 21st Army Group, 'A' Section, SITEP" dated 29 August 1944.) Of these, Canadian losses amounted to 18,444, with 5,021 killed in action. One in seven Canadian soldiers killed between 6–11 June were killed after surrendering, in a series of executions that would be named the Normandy Massacres. The Allied air forces, having flown 480,317 sorties in support of the invasion, lost 4,101 aircraft and 16,714 airmen (8,536 members of the USAAF, and 8,178 flying under the command of the RAF). The Free French SAS paratroopers suffered 77 killed, with 197 wounded and missing. Allied tank losses have been estimated at 4,000, with losses split evenly between the American and British/Canadian armies. Historians slightly differ on overall casualties during the campaign, with the lowest losses totaling 225,606 and the highest at 226,386.

=== Germany ===
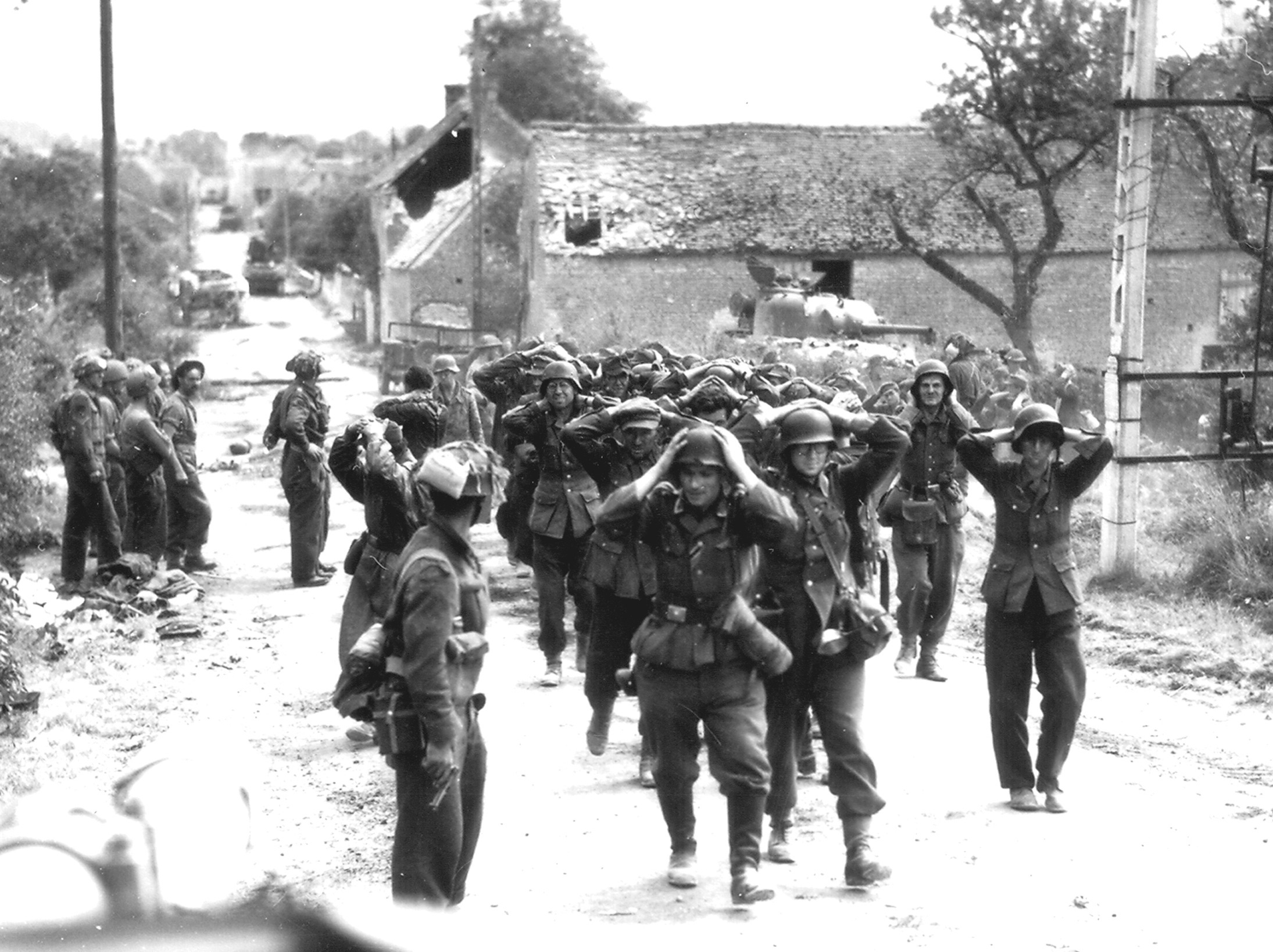
German forces surrender in Saint-Lambert-sur-Dive, 21 August 1944

Allied forces in northern France reported the capture of 47,000 Germans in June, 36,000 in July, and 150,000 in August, a total of 233,000 for the three months of Overlord. Around 80,000 German soldiers are buried in Normandy, although this figure includes an unreported number of Germans who died before the battle or in captivity after the end of the fighting.

German forces in France reported losses of 158,930 men between D-Day and 14 August, just before the start of Operation Dragoon in Southern France. In action at the Falaise pocket, 50,000 men were lost, of whom 10,000 were killed and 40,000 captured. Sources vary on the total German casualties. Niklas Zetterling notes that OB West's figures for summer 1944 in the west (including Operation Dragoon in southern France) amounted to 289,000: 23,019 killed, 67,060 wounded, and 198,616 missing. He states that the record is generally reliable, but also that it may have underestimated losses in some places, such as Cherbourg. (Note: The German official history stated that Army Group G, which faced the Dragoon landings, suffered 141,000 casualties by mid-September. This figure is based on several internal reports and work conducted by German historians.) Zetterling goes on to estimate German army casualties in the Normandy region specifically from June 6 to August as 210,000; however, he notes that "the Germans most likely suffered further manpower losses when air or naval bases were overrun. On this no figures have been available for this study." Other sources arrive at higher estimates: 400,000 (200,000 killed or wounded and a further 200,000 captured), 500,000 (290,000 killed or wounded, 210,000 captured), (Note: The German official history highlights Allied intelligence reports that indicated OB West lost 400,000 to 500,000 men) to 530,000 in total.

There are no exact figures regarding German tank losses in Normandy. Approximately 2,300 tanks and assault guns were committed to the battle, (Note: The most common tank/assault gun deployed at Normandy by the Germans was by far the Panzer IV, followed by the Panther (650) and Stug III (550). Also present were 120–130 Tiger Is, 20 Tiger IIs, and smaller numbers of other types, including Marder and Jagdpanther self-propelled anti-tank guns.) of which only 100 to 120 crossed the Seine at the end of the campaign. While German forces reported only 481 tanks destroyed between D-day and 31 July, research conducted by No. 2 Operational Research Section of 21st Army Group indicates that the Allies destroyed around 550 tanks in June and July and another 500 in August, for a total of 1,050 tanks destroyed, including 100 destroyed by aircraft. Luftwaffe losses amounted to 2,127 aircraft. By the end of the Normandy campaign, 55 German divisions (42 infantry and 13 panzer) had been rendered combat-ineffective; seven of these were disbanded. By September, OB West had only 13 infantry divisions, 3 panzer divisions, and 2 panzer brigades rated as combat-effective.

=== Civilians and French heritage buildings ===
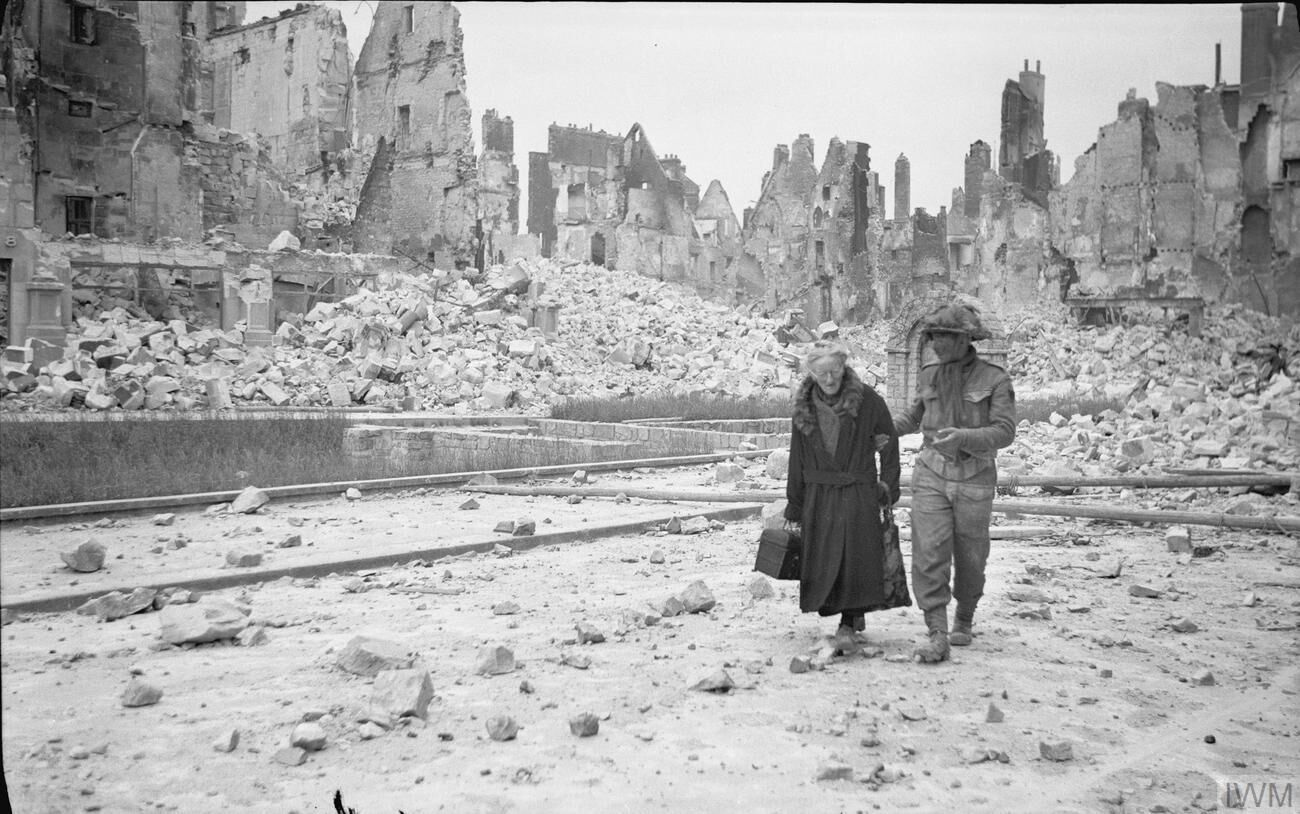
A British soldier escorts an elderly lady in heavily bombed Caen, July 1944

During the liberation of Normandy, between 13,632 and 19,890 French civilians were killed, and more were seriously wounded. In addition to those who died during the campaign, 11,000 to 19,000 Normans are estimated to have been killed during pre-invasion bombing. A total of 70,000 French civilians were killed throughout the course of the war. Land mines and unexploded ordnance continued to inflict casualties upon the Norman population following the end of the campaign.

Prior to the invasion, SHAEF issued instructions (later the basis for the 1954 Hague Convention Protocol I) emphasising the need to limit the destruction to French heritage sites. These sites, named in the Official Civil Affairs Lists of Monuments, were not to be used by troops unless permission was received from the upper echelons of the chain of command. Nevertheless, church spires and other stone buildings throughout the area were damaged or destroyed to prevent them being used by the Germans. Efforts were made to prevent reconstruction workers from using rubble from important ruins to repair roads, and to search for artefacts. The Bayeux Tapestry and other important cultural treasures had been stored at the Château de Sourches near Le Mans from the start of the war, and survived intact. The occupying German forces also kept a list of protected buildings, but their intent was to keep the facilities in good condition for use as accommodation by German troops.

Many cities and towns in Normandy were totally devastated by the fighting and bombings. By the end of the Battle of Caen there remained only 8,000 liveable quarters for a population of over 60,000. Of the 18 listed churches in Caen, four were seriously damaged and five were destroyed, along with 66 other listed monuments. In the Calvados department (location of the Normandy beachhead), 76,000 citizens were rendered homeless. Of Caen's 210 pre-war Jewish population, only one survived the war.

Looting was perpetrated by all sides: the retreating Germans, the invading Allies, and the local French population. Looting was never condoned by Allied forces, and those who were found to be looting were punished.

== War memorials and tourism ==
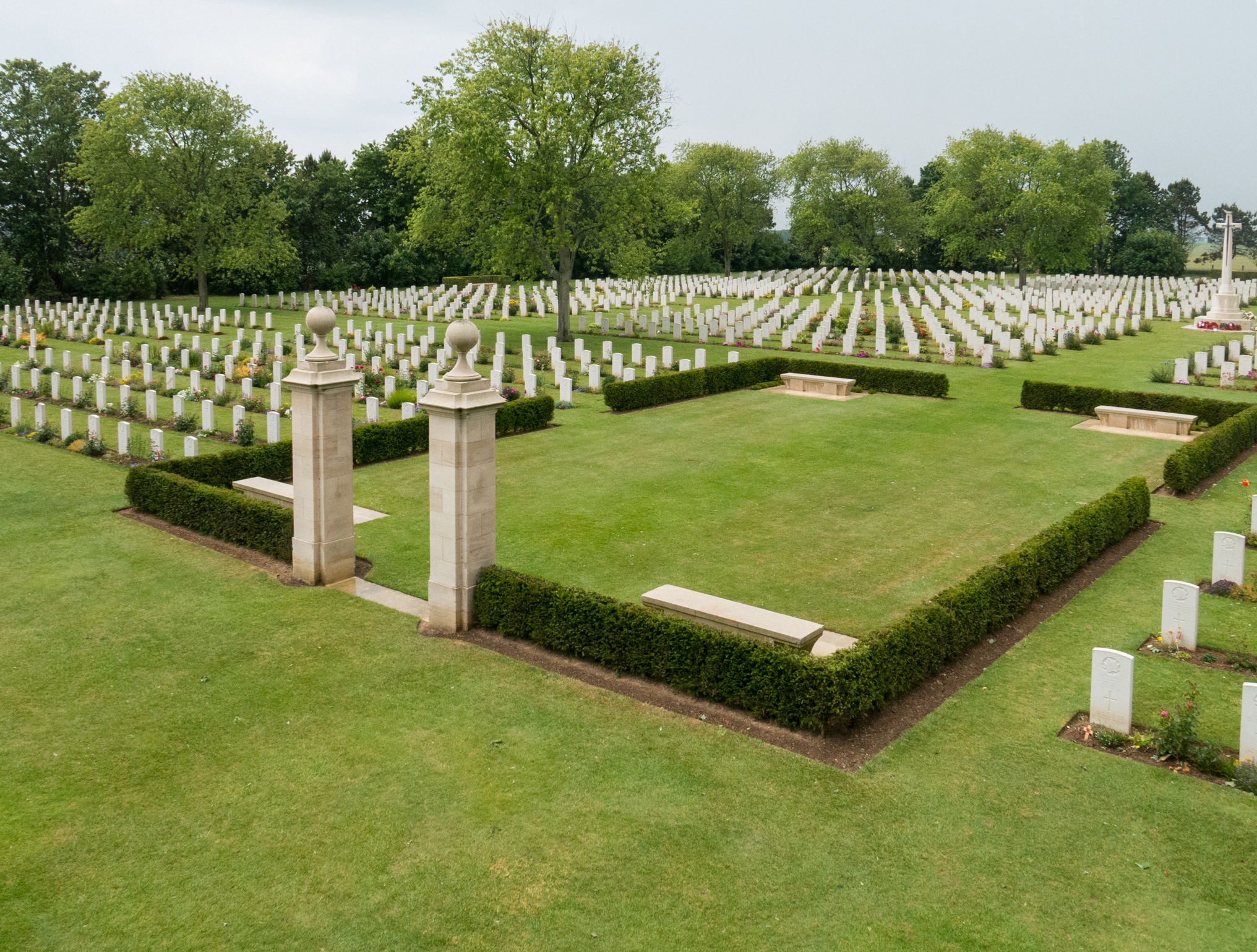
The Bény-sur-Mer Canadian War Cemetery

The beaches of Normandy are still known by their invasion code names. Significant places have plaques, memorials, or small museums, and guide books and maps are available. Some of the German strong points remain preserved; Pointe du Hoc, in particular, is little changed from 1944. The remains of Mulberry harbour B still sits in the sea at Arromanches. Several large cemeteries in the area serve as the final resting place for many of the Allied and German soldiers killed in the Normandy campaign.

Above the English Channel on a bluff at Omaha Beach, the Normandy American Cemetery and Memorial has hosted numerous visitors each year. The site covers 69.8 hectares (172.5 acres) and contains the remains of 9,388 American military dead, most of whom were killed during the invasion of Normandy and ensuing military operations in World War II. Included are graves of Army Air Corps crews shot down over France as early as 1942 and four American women.

== See also ==
- British logistics in the Normandy campaign
- American logistics in the Normandy campaign
- List of Allied forces in the Normandy campaign
- Liberation of France
- Operation Downfall
