= List of Grammy Hall of Fame Award recipients (A–D) =

The Grammy Hall of Fame is a hall of fame to honor musical recordings of lasting qualitative or historical significance. Inductees are selected annually by a special member committee of eminent and knowledgeable professionals from all branches of the recording arts. It is compiled by The Recording Academy in the United States, and was established in 1973. Recordings (singles and albums) in all genres are eligible for selection, and must be at least 25 years old to be considered. Additions to the list are chosen annually by a committee of recording arts professionals.

This list covers the letter(s) A–D.

== List ==
Title	Artist	Record label	Year of release	Genre	Format	Year Inducted
#1 Record	Big Star	Ardent	1972	Power pop	Album	2025
3 Feet High and Rising	De La Soul	Tommy Boy	1989	Alternative hip-hop	Album	2024
"3 O'Clock Blues"	B.B. King	RPM	1951	R&B	Single	2014
1999	Prince	Warner Bros.	1982	Minneapolis sound	Album	2008
Abbey Road	The Beatles	Apple	1969	Rock	Album	1995
"ABC"	The Jackson 5	Motown	1970	R&B	Single	2017
Abraxas	Santana	Columbia	1970	Rock	Album	1999
"Ac-Cent-Tchu-Ate the Positive"	Johnny Mercer and the Pied Pipers	Capitol	1945	Traditional Pop	Single	1998
"Act Naturally"	Buck Owens	Capitol	1963	Country	Single	2013
Afro-Cuban Jazz Suite	Machito	Mercury	1950	Afro-Cuban jazz	Track	2020
After the Gold Rush	Neil Young	Reprise	1970	Folk Rock	Album	2014
"Ain't It a Shame"	Fats Domino	Imperial	1955	Rock & Roll	Single	2002
"Ain't Misbehavin'" (piano solo)	Thomas "Fats" Waller	Victor	1929	Jazz	Single	1984
"Ain't No Mountain High Enough"	Marvin Gaye and Tammi Terrell	Tamla	1967	R&B	Single	1999
"Ain't No Sunshine"	Bill Withers	Sussex	1971	R&B	Single	1999
"Ain't Nobody Here but Us Chickens"	Louis Jordan And His Tympany Five	Decca	1946	Jump Blues	Single	2013
Aja	Steely Dan	ABC	1977	Jazz Fusion	Album	2003
"Alexander's Ragtime Band"	Arthur Collins & Byron Harlan	Victor	1911	Traditional Pop	Single	2005
"Alfie"	Dionne Warwick	Scepter	1967	Pop	Single	2008
"Alice's Restaurant Massacree"	Arlo Guthrie	Reprise	1967	Folk	Single	2002
"All Along the Watchtower"	The Jimi Hendrix Experience	Reprise	1968	Rock	Single	2001
All Eyez on Me	2Pac	Death Row	1996	Hip-hop	Album	2026
"All I Have to Do Is Dream"	The Everly Brothers	Cadence	1958	Jangle Pop	Single	2004
"All I Want for Christmas (Is My Two Front Teeth)"	Spike Jones & His City Slickers	RCA Victor	1948	Novelty	Single	2007
"All of Me"	Louis Armstrong & His Orchestra	Columbia	1932	Jazz	Single	2005
All Things Must Pass	George Harrison	Apple	1970	Rock	Album	2014
"Allons à Lafayette (Lafayette)"	Joe Falcon	Columbia	1928	Cajun	Single	2013
"Always on My Mind"	Willie Nelson	Columbia	1982	Country	Single	2008
"Am I Blue?"	Ethel Waters	Columbia	1929	Traditional Pop	Single	2007
"Amazing Grace"	The Dixie Hummingbirds	Apollo	1946	Gospel	Single	2000
Amazing Grace	Aretha Franklin with James Cleveland and the Southern California Comm. Choir	Atlantic	1972	Gospel	Album	1999
"America the Beautiful"	Ray Charles	ABC/TRC	1972	R&B	Track	2005
American Beauty	Grateful Dead	Warner Bros.	1970	Country Rock	Album	2016
"American Pie"	Don McLean	U.A.	1971	Folk Rock	Single	2002
Amor Prohibido	Selena	EMI Latin	1994	Tejano	Album	2026
An American in Paris — Soundtrack	Gene Kelly & Various Artists	MGM	1951	Soundtrack	Album	2006
An Evening with Andres Segovia	Andrés Segovia	Decca	1954	Classical	Album	1999
"And the Angels Sing"	Benny Goodman and His Orchestra, Martha Tilton, Vocal & Ziggy Elman, Trumpet	RCA Victor	1939	Jazz	Single	1987
Annie Get Your Gun	Original Broadway cast (Ethel Merman, Ray Middleton)	Decca	1946	Musical Show	Album	1998
Anthology of American Folk Music	Various Artists	Folkways	1952	Folk	Album	2012
"Any Old Time"	Artie Shaw	Victor Records	1938	Traditional Pop	Single	2001
"Anything Goes"	Cole Porter	His Master's Voice	1934	Pop	Single	2012
Appetite for Destruction	Guns N' Roses	Geffen	1987	Hard Rock	Album	2024
"April in Paris"	Count Basie & His Orchestra	Clef	1955	Jazz	Single	1985
"Aquarius/Let the Sunshine In (The Flesh Failures)"	5th Dimension	Soul City	1969	Psychedelic Soul	Single	2004
Are You Experienced?	The Jimi Hendrix Experience	Reprise	1967	Rock	Album	1999
"Are You Lonesome Tonight?"	Elvis Presley	RCA Victor	1960	Traditional Pop	Single	2007
"Artistry in Rhythm"	Stan Kenton And His Orchestra	Capitol	1945	Jazz	Single	1985
"As Time Goes By"	Dooley Wilson	Decca	1944	Soundtrack	Single	2010
The Astaire Story	Fred Astaire & The Oscar Peterson Quintet	Mercury	1953	Vocal Jazz	Album	1999
Astral Weeks	Van Morrison	Warner Bros.	1968	Folk	Album	1999
At Fillmore East	The Allman Brothers Band	Capricorn	1971	Blues Rock	Album	1999
"At Last"	Etta James	Argo	1961	Soul Blues	Single	1999
"At Seventeen"	Janis Ian	Columbia	1975	Soft Rock	Single	2008
"A-Tisket, A-Tasket"	Chick Webb And His Orchestra With Ella Fitzgerald	Decca	1938	Jazz	Single	1986
"Au Clair de la Lune"	Édouard-Léon Scott De Martinville	N/A	1860	Folk	Single	2021
Autobahn	Kraftwerk	Vertigo	1974	Krautrock	Album	2015
Axis: Bold as Love	The Jimi Hendrix Experience	Reprise	1968	Pop Rock	Album	2006
Bach: Goldberg Variations	Glenn Gould	Columbia	1956	Classical	Album	1983
Bach: Goldberg Variations for Harpsichord	Wanda Landowska	RCA Victor	1945	Classical	Album	1986
Bach: Sonata No. 1 for Unaccompanied Violin, BWV 1001	Joseph Szigeti	Columbia	1931	Classical	Album	1998
Bach: Suites for Unaccompanied Cello (6)	Pablo Casals	RCA Victor	1936-39	Classical	Album	1985
Bach: The Well-Tempered Clavier (Complete)	Wanda Landowska	RCA Victor	1949-54	Classical	Album	1977
Bach-Stokowski: Toccata & Fugue in D Minor	Leopold Stokowski cond. The Philadelphia Orchestra	Victor	1927	Classical	Single	1978
Back in Black	AC/DC	Albert/Atlantic	1980	Hard Rock	Album	2013
"Back in the Saddle Again"	Gene Autry	Vocalion	1939	Country	Single	1997
Ballad for Americans	Paul Robeson with Victor Symphony Orchestra & American People's Chorus; Orchestra conducted by Nathaniel Shilkret; Choir directed by Earl Robinson	Victor	1940	Traditional Pop	Album	1980
Ballads	John Coltrane Quartet	Impulse!	1962	Jazz	Album	2008
Band of Gypsys	Jimi Hendrix	Capitol	1970	Rock	Album	2018
"Banana Boat (Day-O)"	Harry Belafonte	RCA Victor	1956	Calypso	Single	2009
The Band	The Band	Capitol	1969	Roots Rock	Album	1999
Band on the Run	Paul McCartney and Wings	Apple	1973	Rock	Album	2013
Barber: Violin Concerto	Isaac Stern with New York Philharmonic conducted by Leonard Bernstein	Columbia	1964	Classical	Album	2007
The Barbra Streisand Album	Barbra Streisand	Columbia	1963	Traditional Pop	Album	2006
Bartók: Concerto for Orchestra	Chicago Symphony Orchestra conducted by Fritz Reiner	RCA Victor	1956	Classical	Album	1998
Bartók: Contrasts for Violin, Clarinet & Piano	Béla Bartók, piano; Joseph Szigeti, violin; Benny Goodman, clarinet	Columbia	1940	Classical	Album	1989
Bartók: Quartets	Juilliard Quartet	Columbia	1950	Classical	Album	1987
The Basement Tapes	Bob Dylan and The Band	Columbia	1975	Roots Rock	Album	2016
"The Battle of New Orleans"	Johnny Horton	Columbia	1959	Country	Single	2002
"Be-Bop-A-Lula"	Gene Vincent & his Blue Caps	Capitol	1956	Rockabilly	Single	1999
"Be My Baby"	The Ronettes	Philles	1963	Pop	Single	1999
The Beatles (aka "The White Album")	The Beatles	Apple	1968	Pop Rock	Album	2000
Beethoven: Concerto in D Major for Violin and Orchestra	Jascha Heifetz with NBC Symphony Orchestra conducted by Arturo Toscanini	Victor	1940	Classical	Album	1996
Beethoven: Concerto for Piano Numbers 1–5	Artur Schnabel (on piano) with London Symphony Orchestra (1, 5) & London Philharmonic Orchestra (2, 3, 4); Orchestras conducted by Malcolm Sargent	Victor	1932-1935	Classical	Album	1989
Beethoven: The Five Piano Concerti (Complete)	Leon Fleisher with Cleveland Orchestra conducted by George Szell	Columbia	1959-1961	Classical	Album	2008
Beethoven: Piano Sonatas (32)	Artur Schnabel	Beethoven Society	1932-1938	Classical	Album	1975
Beethoven: Quartets for Strings	Budapest String Quartet	Columbia	1952	Classical	Album	1981
Beethoven: Symphonies	NBC Symphony Orchestra conducted by Arturo Toscanini	RCA Victor	1950–1953	Classical	Album	1977
Beethoven: Symphony No. 5	Berlin Philharmonic conducted by Arthur Nikisch	His Master's Voice	1913	Classical	Album	2008
Beethoven: Symphony No. 7 in A-Major Op. 92	New York Philharmonic conducted by Arturo Toscanini	RCA Victor	1936	Classical	Album	2007
Beggars Banquet	The Rolling Stones	London	1968	Roots Rock	Album	1999
"Begin the Beguine"	Artie Shaw and His Orchestra	Bluebird	1938	Jazz	Single	1977
"Behind Closed Doors"	Charlie Rich	Epic	1973	Country	Single	1999
"Bei Mir Bist Du Schon"	The Andrews Sisters	Decca	1937	Traditional Pop	Single	1996
Belafonte at Carnegie Hall	Harry Belafonte	RCA Victor	1959	Pop	Album	1999
"Bellini: Casta Diva" (from Norma)	Rosa Ponselle with Metropolitan Opera Orchestra & Chorus conducted by Giulio Setti	Victor	1929	Opera	Single	2008
Bells Are Ringing	Original Broadway cast (Judy Holliday, Sydney Chaplin)	Columbia	1956	Musical Show	Album	2000
Berg: Wozzeck	New York Philharmonic Orchestra conducted by Dimitri Mitropoulos; Cast: Mack Harrell, Eileen Farrell, etc.	Columbia Masterworks	1951	Opera	Album	1990
Bernstein: Mass – A Theatre Piece for Singers, Players and Dancers	Leonard Bernstein	Columbia Masterworks	1971	Musical theatre	Album	2019
"Big Girls Don't Cry"	The Four Seasons	Vee-Jay	1962	Rock	Single	2015
"Bill"	Helen Morgan	Victor	1928	Musical Theater	Single	1998
"Billie's Bounce"	Charlie Parker and His Re-Boppers	Savoy	1945	Jazz	Single	2002
"Birdland"	Weather Report	Columbia	1977	Jazz Fusion	Single	2010
Birth of the Cool	Miles Davis	Capitol	1957	Cool Jazz	Album	1982
Bitches Brew	Miles Davis	Columbia	1969	Jazz Fusion	Album	1999
Bizet: Carmen	RCA Victor Orchestra conducted by Fritz Reiner & Robert Shaw Chorale directed by Robert Shaw (Cast: Risë Stevens, Jan Peerce, Licia Albanese & Robert Merrill)	RCA Red Seal	1951	Opera	Album	2008
"Black, Brown and Beige"	Duke Ellington & His Orchestra	RCA Victor	1943	Jazz	Single	1990
"Black Mountain Rag"	Doc Watson	Vanguard	1964	Folk	Single	2006
"Black and Tan Fantasy"	Duke Ellington & His Orchestra	Victor	1927	Jazz	Single	1981
Bloch: Schelomo	Emanuel Feuermann with The Philadelphia Orchestra conducted by Leopold Stokowski	RCA Victor	1940	Classical	Album	1999
Blonde on Blonde	Bob Dylan	Columbia	1966	Rock	Album	1999
Blood on the Tracks	Bob Dylan	Columbia	1975	Folk Rock	Album	2015
Blood, Sweat & Tears	Blood, Sweat & Tears	Columbia	1969	Rock	Album	2002
"Blowin' in the Wind"	Bob Dylan	Columbia	1963	Folk	Single	1994
"Blowin' in the Wind"	Peter, Paul and Mary	Warner Bros.	1963	Folk	Single	2003
Blue	Joni Mitchell	Reprise	1971	Contemporary Folk	Album	1999
"Blue Moon of Kentucky"	Bill Monroe & his Blue Grass Boys	Columbia	1945	Bluegrass	Single	1998
"Blue Suede Shoes"	Carl Perkins	Sun	1956	Rock & Roll	Single	1986
Blue Train	John Coltrane	Blue Note	1957	Hard Bop Jazz	Album	1999
"Blue Yodel"	Jimmie Rodgers	Victor	1927	Country	Single	1985
"Blue Yodel #9 (Standing on the Corner)"	Jimmie Rodgers with Louis Armstrong & Lil Hardin Armstrong	Victor	1930	Blues	Single	2007
"Blueberry Hill"	Fats Domino	Imperial	1956	Rock & Roll	Single	1987
"Blues Stay Away from Me"	The Delmore Brothers	King	1949	Country	Single	2007
Blues Breakers with Eric Clapton	John Mayall with Eric Clapton	Decca, London	1966	Blues	Album	2021
"Bo Diddley"	Bo Diddley	Checker	1955	Rock & Roll	Single	1998
"Body and Soul"	Coleman Hawkins	Bluebird	1939	Jazz	Single	1974
Bogalusa Boogie	Clifton Chenier	Arhoolie	1976	Zydeco	Album	2011
"Bohemian Rhapsody"	Queen	EMI	1975	Rock	Single	2004
"Bonaparte's Retreat"	William Hamilton Stepp	Library of Congress	1937	Folk	Single	2013
"Boogie Chillen'"	John Lee Hooker	Modern	1948	Blues	Single	1999
"Boogie Woogie Bugle Boy"	The Andrews Sisters	Decca	1941	Jump Blues	Single	2000
"Boom Boom"	John Lee Hooker	Vee-Jay	1962	Blues	Single	2016
Born in the U.S.A.	Bruce Springsteen	Columbia	1984	Rock	Album	2012
"Born to Be Wild"	Steppenwolf	Dunhill	1968	Hard Rock	Single	2002
Born to Run	Bruce Springsteen	Columbia	1975	Rock & Roll	Album	2003
Born Under a Bad Sign	Albert King	Stax	1967	Electric Blues	Album	1999
"Both Sides, Now"	Judy Collins	Elektra	1968	Folk	Single	2003
Brahms: Trio No. 1 in B Major	Jascha Heifetz (Violin), Emanuel Feuermann (Cello), Arthur Rubinstein (piano)	Victor	1941	Classical	Album	1999
"Brazil (Aquarela Do Brazil)"	Jimmy Dorsey & his Orchestra	Decca	1942	Jazz	Single	2009
Breezin'	George Benson	Warner Bros.	1976	Smooth Jazz	Album	2008
The Bridge	Sonny Rollins	Bluebird	1962	Jazz	Album	2015
"Bridge Over Troubled Water"	Simon & Garfunkel	Columbia	1970	Pop	Single	1998
Brigadoon	Original Broadway Cast (Marion Bell, David Brooks, Pamela Britton, Lee Sullivan)	RCA Victor	1947	Musical Show	Album	2011
Brilliant Corners	Thelonious Monk	Riverside	1956	Hard Bop Jazz	Album	1999
"Bring It On Home to Me"	Sam Cooke	RCA Victor	1962	Soul	Single	2018
Bringing It All Back Home	Bob Dylan	Columbia	1965	Folk Rock	Album	2006
Britten: War Requiem Op. 66	London Symphony Orchestra & Chorus conducted by Benjamin Britten; Highgate School Boys Choir, The Bach Choir (BGVs); Melos Ensemble (extra instruments); Galina Vishnevskaya (soprano vocals), Peter Pears (tenor vocals), Dietrich Fischer-Dieskau (baritone vocals)	London	1963	Classical	Album	1998
"Brother, Can You Spare a Dime?"	Bing Crosby	Brunswick	1932	Musical Theater	Single	2005
"Brown Eyed Girl"	Van Morrison	Bang	1967	Rock	Single	2007
Buena Vista Social Club	Buena Vista Social Club	World Circuit	1997	Jazz	Album	2024
The Button-Down Mind of Bob Newhart	Bob Newhart	Warner Bros.	1960	Stand-Up Comedy	Album	2007
"By the Time I Get to Phoenix"	Glen Campbell	Capitol	1967	Country	Single	2004
"Bye Bye Blackbird"	Gene Austin	Victor	1926	Jazz	Single	2005
"Bye Bye Love"	The Everly Brothers	Cadence	1957	Country	Single	1998
Cabaret: Original Motion Picture Soundtrack	Various Artists (Cast: Liza Minnelli, Joel Grey, etc.)	ABC	1972	Soundtrack	Album	2008
"Caldonia Boogie"	Louis Jordan & His Tympany Five	Decca	1945	Jump Blues	Single	1998
"California Dreamin'"	The Mamas & the Papas	Dunhill	1966	Sunshine Pop	Single	2001
"California Girls"	The Beach Boys	Capitol	1965	Pop Rock	Single	2010
"California, Here I Come"	Al Jolson with The Isham Jones Orchestra	Brunswick	1924	Traditional Pop	Single	2005
"Call It Stormy Monday"	T-Bone Walker	Black & White	1948	Blues	Single	1991
Calypso	Harry Belafonte	RCA Victor	1956	Mento	Album	2015
Camelot	Original Broadway Cast (Richard Burton, Julie Andrews, Robert Goulet)	Columbia	1960	Musical Show	Album	2006
"Can the Circle Be Unbroken (By and By)"	The Carter Family	Banner	1935	Country	Single	1998
Canciones de Mi Padre	Linda Ronstadt	Rhino	1987	Latin	Album	2021
Car Wheels on a Gravel Road	Lucinda Williams	Mercury	1998	Country	Album	2026
Candide	Original Broadway cast (Barbara Cook, Max Adrian, Robert Rounseville)	Columbia	1956	Musical Show	Album	1998
"Candy"	Big Maybelle	Savoy	1956	Blues	Single	1999
Capitol Presents The King Cole Trio	The King Cole Trio	Capitol	1944	Jazz	Album	2020
"Caravan"	Duke Ellington & his Orchestra with Ivie Anderson & Juan Tizol	Master	1937	Jazz	Single	2009
The Famous 1938 Carnegie Hall Jazz Concert	Benny Goodman	Columbia	1950	Jazz	Album	1975
"Carolina Shout"	James P. Johnson	Okeh	1921	Jazz	Single	2020
Carousel	Original Broadway cast (John Raitt, Jan Clayton, Jean Darling)	Decca	1945	Musical Show	Album	1998
The Cars	The Cars	Elektra	1978	Power pop	Album	2021
"Cat's in the Cradle"	Harry Chapin	Elektra	1974	Soft Rock	Single	2011
Catch a Fire	Bob Marley and the Wailers	Tuff Gong	1973	Reggae	Album	2010
"Celebration"	Kool & the Gang	De-Lite	1980	Post-disco	Single	2016
"Chain of Fools"	Aretha Franklin	Atlantic	1967	R&B	Single	2001
"Chances Are"	Johnny Mathis	Columbia	1957	Traditional Pop	Single	1998
"A Change Is Gonna Come"	Sam Cooke	RCA Victor	1964	R&B	Single	2000
"Changes"	David Bowie	RCA	1972	Art pop	Single	2017
A Charlie Brown Christmas	Vince Guaraldi Trio	Fantasy	1965	Jazz	Album	2007
Charlie Parker with Strings	Charlie Parker	Mercury	1950	Jazz	Album	1988
"Chattanooga Choo Choo"	Glenn Miller Orchestra with Tex Beneke and the Modernaires	Bluebird	1941	Swing	Single	1996
Cheap Thrills	Big Brother and the Holding Company	Columbia	1968	Rock	Album	2007
"Cheek to Cheek"	Fred Astaire with Leo Reisman and His Orchestra	Brunswick	1935	Soundtrack	Single	2000
"Chega de Saudade"	João Gilberto	Odeon	1958	Bossa Nova	Single	2000
"Cherokee"	Charlie Barnet & his Orchestra	Bluebird	1939	Jazz	Single	1998
Chet Baker Sings	Chet Baker	Pacific Jazz	1956	Jazz	Album	2001
The Chicago Transit Authority	Chicago	Columbia	1969	Progressive Rock	Album	2014
Child Is Father to the Man	Blood, Sweat & Tears	Columbia	1968	Rock	Album	1999
"Chimes Blues"	King Oliver & his Creole Jazz Band	Gennett	1923	Jazz	Single	1996
"Choo Choo Ch'Boogie"	Louis Jordan & his Tympany Five	Decca	1946	R&B	Single	2008
Chopin: 14 Waltzes	Dinu Lipatti	Columbia	1952	Classical	Album	1998
Chopin: Mazurkas (Complete)	Arthur Rubinstein	RCA Victor	1965	Classical	Album	2006
A Chorus Line	Original Broadway Cast (Priscilla Lopez, Wayne Cilento, etc.)	Columbia	1975	Musical Show	Album	2007
A Christmas Gift for You from Phil Spector	Phil Spector and Various Artists	Philles	1963	R&B	Album	1999
"The Christmas Song"	Nat King Cole	Capitol	1946	Traditional Pop	Single	1974
The Chronic	Dr. Dre	Death Row	1992	Hip-hop	Album	2018
"Cissy Strut"	The Meters	Josie	1969	Funk	Single	2011
"City of New Orleans"	Arlo Guthrie	Reprise	1972	Folk	Single	2017
Class Clown	George Carlin	Little David	1972	Comedy	Album	2010
"Clean Up Woman"	Betty Wright	Alston	1971	Soul	Single	2021
Clifford Brown & Max Roach	Clifford Brown and Max Roach	Emarcy	1954	Jazz	Album	1999
Clouds	Joni Mitchell	Reprise	1969	Folk	Album	2020
"Coal Miner's Daughter"	Loretta Lynn	Decca	1970	Country	Single	1998
"Coat of Many Colors"	Dolly Parton	RCA Victor	1971	Country	Single	2019
"Cocktails for Two"	Spike Jones and His City Slickers	RCA Victor	1945	Comedy	Single	1995
"Cocktails for Two"	Duke Ellington	RCA Victor	1934	Jazz	Single	2007
"Cold Sweat Part 1"	James Brown & his Orchestra	King	1967	Funk	Single	2016
"Color Him Father"	Linda Martell	Plantation	1969	Country pop	Single	2025
Come Fly with Me	Frank Sinatra	Capitol	1958	Vocal Jazz	Album	2004
Company	Original Broadway Cast (Dean Jones, Elaine Stritch, Pamela Myers, Susan Browning, Donna McKechnie)	Columbia	1970	Musical Show	Album	2008
Concert by the Sea	Erroll Garner Trio	Columbia	1956	Jazz	Album	1999
"Conga"	Gloria Estefan & Miami Sound Machine	Epic	1985	Latin	Single	2025
Conversations with Myself	Bill Evans	Verve	1963	Jazz	Album	2000
"Cool Water"	Sons of the Pioneers	Decca	1941	Country	Single	1986
"Copenhagen"	Fletcher Henderson And His Orchestra	Gennett	1924	Jazz	Single	2021
Copland: Appalachian Spring	Boston Symphony Orchestra conducted by Aaron Copland	RCA Victor	1959	Classical	Album	2000
"Copland: Appalachian Spring"	New York Philharmonic conducted by Leonard Bernstein	Columbia	1961	Classical	Single	2009
"Copland: Fanfare for the Common Man"	London Symphony Orchestra conducted by Aaron Copland	Columbia	1968	Classical	Single	2009
Copland: Symphony No. 3	Minneapolis Symphony Orchestra conducted by Antal Doráti	Mercury	1951	Classical	Album	2007
Cosmo's Factory	Creedence Clearwater Revival	Fantasy	1970	Rock	Album	2014
Court and Spark	Joni Mitchell	Asylum	1974	Smooth Jazz	Album	2004
The Cradle Will Rock	Original Broadway cast (Orson Welles, Marc Blitzstein, Vivian Vance etc.)	Musicraft	1938	Musical Show	Album	1998
"Crazy"	Patsy Cline	Decca	1962	Country Pop	Single	1992
"Crazy Arms"	Ray Price	Columbia	1956	Country	Single	1999
"Crazy Blues"	Mamie Smith and Her Jazz Hounds	Okeh	1920	Blues	Single	1994
"Crazy He Calls Me"	Billie Holiday	Decca	1949	Jazz	Single	2010
Crosby, Stills & Nash	Crosby, Stills & Nash	Atlantic	1969	Folk Rock	Album	1999
"Cross Road Blues"	Robert Johnson	Vocalion	1936	Blues	Single	1998
Crosscurrents	Lennie Tristano & his Sextet	Capitol	1949	Jazz	Album	2013
"Cry"	Johnnie Ray (with The Four Lads)	Okeh	1951	Traditional Pop	Single	1998
"Cry Me a River"	Julie London	Liberty	1955	Traditional Pop	Single	2001
"Crying"	Roy Orbison	Monument	1961	Country Rock	Single	2002
"Crying in the Chapel"	The Orioles	Jubilee	1953	R&B	Single	2008
"Dance to the Music"	Sly and the Family Stone	Epic	1968	Psychedelic Soul	Single	1998
"Dancing in the Street"	Martha and the Vandellas	Gordy	1964	R&B	Single	1999
"Dancing Queen"	ABBA	Polar	1976	Europop	Single	2015
"Dang Me"	Roger Miller	Smash	1964	Country	Single	1998
"The Dark End of the Street"	James Carr	Goldwax	1967	Soul	Single	2016
The Dark Side of the Moon	Pink Floyd	Harvest	1973	Progressive Rock	Album	1999
"Dark Was the Night, Cold Was the Ground"	Blind Willie Johnson	Columbia	1927	Gospel blues	Single	2011
"Darktown Strutters' Ball"	Original Dixieland Jazz Band	Columbia	1917	Jazz	Single	2006
"Days of Wine and Roses"	Henry Mancini	RCA	1962	Soundtrack	Single	2003
"Dead Man's Curve"	Jan and Dean	Liberty	1964	Car Song	Single	2008
"(Dear Mr. Gable) You Made Me Love You"	Judy Garland	Decca	1937	Soundtrack	Single	1998
Debussy: Preludes, Book I and II	Walter Gieseking	Columbia	1953-54	Classical	Album	1998
"Deep in the Heart of Texas"	Gene Autry	Columbia	1942	Soundtrack	Single	2012
Déjà Vu	Crosby, Stills, Nash & Young	Atlantic	1970	Rock	Album	2012
"Desafinado"	Stan Getz and Charlie Byrd	Verve	1962	Bossa Nova	Single	2000
Desperado	Eagles	Asylum	1973	Rock	Album	2000
"Devil Got My Woman"	Skip James	Paramount	1931	Blues	Single	2020
"Diminuendo and Crescendo in Blue"	Duke Ellington and His Orchestra	Columbia	1956	Jazz	Single	1999
"Dinah"	Ethel Waters	Columbia	1925	Traditional Pop	Single	1998
"Dippermouth Blues"	King Oliver & his Creole Jazz Band	Okeh	1923	Jazz	Single	2010
Disraeli Gears	Cream	Atco	1967	Psychedelic pop	Album	1999
"Djangology"	Quintet of the Hot Club of France Featuring Django Reinhardt & Stéphane Grappelli	Decca	1935	Jazz	Single	1999
"Do Nothin' Till You Hear from Me"	Duke Ellington & his Orchestra featuring Al Hibbler	Victor	1944	Jazz	Single	2011
"Do You Believe in Magic"	The Lovin' Spoonful	Kama Sutra	1965	Folk Rock	Single	2002
Doc Watson	Doc Watson	Vanguard	1964	Folk	Album	2014
"Don't Be Cruel"	Elvis Presley	RCA Victor	1956	Rock & Roll	Single	2002
"Don't Fence Me In"	Bing Crosby and The Andrews Sisters	Decca	1944	Traditional Pop	Single	1998
"Don't Get Around Much Anymore (Never No Lament)"	Duke Ellington & his Famous Orchestra	Victor	1940	Jazz	Single	2010
Don't Go to Strangers	Etta Jones	Prestige	1960	Jazz	Album	2008
"Don't Let Your Deal Go Down Blues"	Charlie Poole	Columbia	1925	Country	Single	2007
"Don't Make Me Over"	Dionne Warwick	Scepter	1962	Pop	Single	2000
"Don't Sit Under the Apple Tree (with Anyone Else but Me)"	The Andrews Sisters	Decca	1942	Pop	Single	2016
"Don't Stop Believin'"	Journey	Columbia	1981	Rock	Single	2020
The Doors	The Doors	Elektra	1967	Psychedelic Rock	Album	2002
"Downhearted Blues"	Bessie Smith with Clarence Williams	Columbia	1923	Blues	Single	2006
"Downtown"	Petula Clark	Warner Bros.	1964	Soul	Single	2003
"Dream On"	Aerosmith	Columbia	1973	Rock	Single	2018
Dreamboat Annie	Heart	Mushroom	1975	Hard rock	Album	2026
"Duke of Earl"	Gene Chandler	Vee-Jay	1961	Soul	Single	2002
Dust Bowl Ballads, Volumes 1 & 2	Woody Guthrie	Victor	1940	Folk	Album	1998
"Dust My Broom"	Elmore James	Trumpet	1952	Blues	Single	1998
Dusty in Memphis	Dusty Springfield	Atlantic	1969	Pop	Album	2001
Dvořák: Concerto in B Minor for Cello and Orchestra	Pablo Casals with Czech Philharmonic Orchestra conducted by George Szell	Angel Records	1938	Classical	Album	1998

== See also ==
- Grammy Award
- Grammy Hall of Fame
- List of Grammy Hall of Fame Award recipients (E–I)
- List of Grammy Hall of Fame Award recipients (J–P)
- List of Grammy Hall of Fame Award recipients (Q–Z)
