= Going Back Home (disambiguation) =

- Going Back Home is an album by Wilko Johnson and Roger Daltrey
- Going Back Home (Frankie Lee album), an album by Frankie Lee

Going Back Home or Goin' Back Home may also refer to:

- "Going Back Home", a song by Clifton Chenier from I'm Here!
- "Going Back Home", a song by Cockney Rejects from Unheard Rejects
- "Going Back Home", a song by Dr. Feelgood from Malpractice
- "Goin' Back Home", a song by Fourplay from Heartfelt
- "Goin' Back Home", a song by John Fogerty from Eye of the Zombie
- "Goin' Back Home", a song by Lightnin' Hopkins from Something Blue
- "Going Back Home", a song by Mika Nakashima from Yes
- "Going Back Home", a song by Mungo Jerry from the EP Open Up
- "Goin' Back Home", a song by Paul Jones from Pucker Up Buttercup
- "Goin' Back Home", a song by the Reverend Horton Heat from Revival
- "Going Back Home", a song by Seaman Dan from Perfect Pearl
- "Going Back Home", a song by Son Seals from Midnight Son
- "Going Back Home", a song by the Temptations from Still Here
- "Going Back Home", a song by Troy Cassar-Daley from the album Brighter Day
- "Goin' Back Home", a song by Walter Trout from Unspoiled by Progress: 20 Years of Hardcore Blues
- "Going Back Home", a song by Black Strobe
- "Going Back Home", an early version of "Gotta Go Home" by Boney M
- "Going Back Home", a song by Harmonica Slim
- "Going Back Home", a song by Howlin' Wolf
- "Goin' Back Home", a song by Lucinda Williams from the single "Changed the Locks"
- Going Back Home, an album by the Bawdies
- Going Back Home, an album by Benny Turner and Cash McCall
- Going Back Home, an album by Ginger Baker
- Goin' Back Home, an album by Grady Champion
- Goin' Back Home, an album by Homesick James
- Going Back Home, an album by Phillip Walker
- Going Back Home, an album by Sherman Robertson
- Goin' Back Home, an EP by the Steepwater Band
- Going Back Home, a film by Louise Bourque
- "Going Back Home", a two-part episode of Blanca
- "Africa (Goin' Back Home)", a song by Doug E. Fresh from The World's Greatest Entertainer
