= Beethoven's 5th (Nikisch recording) =

The 1913 recording of Beethoven's Fifth Symphony by the Berlin Philharmonic conducted by Arthur Nikisch has been regarded as the first complete recording of a full length orchestral work, attributed by Joseph Szigeti as the first recording of Beethoven's "Fifth". The recording was widely distributed and has been described as having marked an "epochal" change in the music industry. In fact the first recording of Beethoven's "Fifth" was three years earlier, by Friedrich Kark and the Odeon Symphony Orchestra in Berlin in 1910. Both the Kark and Nikisch recordings were cut in performance and the first fully and wholly complete recording of Beethoven's Fifth was only made by Albert Coates around 1920. Another Fifth by François Ruhlmann and an unnamed orchestra on Pathé 5024 has been variously dated as early as 1912, or possibly 1916.
