= Frankie Lee (blues musician) =

American songwriter

- Also known as: Little Frankie Lee
- Born: Frankie Lee Jones; April 29, 1941; Mart, Texas, United States
- Died: April 24, 2015 (aged 73) Sacramento, California, United States
- Genres: Soul blues, electric blues
- Occupations: Singer, songwriter
- Instrument: Vocals
- Years active: 1960s–2015
- Labels: Various including Peacock, HighTone, Blind Pig

Frankie Lee (April 29, 1941 – April 24, 2015) was an American soul blues and electric blues singer and songwriter who released six albums. His style has been compared to that of Otis Redding. The New York Daily News wrote that Lee had "one of the most energetic blues voices of any time or place".

== Life and career ==
Frankie Lee Jones was born in Mart, Texas. As a child, he sang gospel music in church. In 1963, he signed a recording contract with Peacock Records. Billed as Little Frankie Lee, he released three singles, including "Taxi Blues", a regional hit and his best-known song. After living with his friend Sonny Rhodes in Austin, Texas, Lee was recruited by Ike Turner to join the touring ensemble backing Ike & Tina Turner. Lee later said of that time, "I'll never forget it. I dug the music and the way they performed. Tina in particular just knocked me out. It was amazing how she would go out and grab an audience—that's what I wanted to do. So I would just sit back and take notes. I learned a lot." Lee then settled in Houston and worked with other musicians, including Big Mama Thornton, Ted Taylor, Junior Parker and Joe Hinton.

Lee befriended Albert Collins during this period, and in 1965, they both relocated to California, with Lee singing in Collins's band from that time until 1968. In 1971, Lee was signed to Elka Records, and his cousin, Johnny "Guitar" Watson, produced Lee's tracks. Also in 1971, "Little" Frankie Lee, as he was known at the time, performed regular gigs at Joe's Nairobi Lounge in East Palo Alto, across from the now defunct Nairobi Village Shopping Center. His band was known as "Little Frankie Lee and the Lee-ettes", sporting guitarist Robert Valdez and several female backup singers. In the late 1970s, Lee's backing ensemble included the young Robert Cray.

His first album, The Ladies and the Babies, was released by HighTone Records in 1984. The Allmusic journalist Thom Owens noted that "as one of the first albums on HighTone Records, the album helped set the stage for the numerous records and artists that teetered between soul and blues."

Lee appeared at the Chicago Blues Festival with Sonny Rhodes, before relocating to New Jersey in 1986. He continued to perform live, gaining a growing reputation for the quality and energy of his live performances. Flying Fish Records released Lee's second album, Sooner or Later (1992), on which he was backed by Doug Newby and the Bluz Blasters, with a guest appearance by Lucky Peterson. Going Back Home (1994) was released by Blind Pig Records. Lee toured widely, playing at American music festivals and in Europe and Japan.

In 2004, Lee performed with Dan Treanor on the album African Wind.

Lee's final album, Standing at the Crossroads, was released in 2006 by Blues Express. The album was produced by Dennis Walker, who had produced The Ladies and the Babies more than twenty years earlier. Lee was nominated for the Bay Area Blues Vocalist of the Year award.

Lee died on April 24, 2015, in Sacramento, California, aged 73.

== Discography ==
=== Albums ===
Year	Title	Record label
1984	The Ladies and the Babies	HighTone
1992	Sooner or Later	Flying Fish
1994	Going Back Home	Blind Pig
1999	Here I Go Again	Blues Express
2004	African Wind, with Dan Treanor	Northern Blues
2006	Standing at the Crossroads	Blues Express

== See also ==
- List of soul-blues musicians
- List of electric blues musicians
