= Mosonszentmiklós =

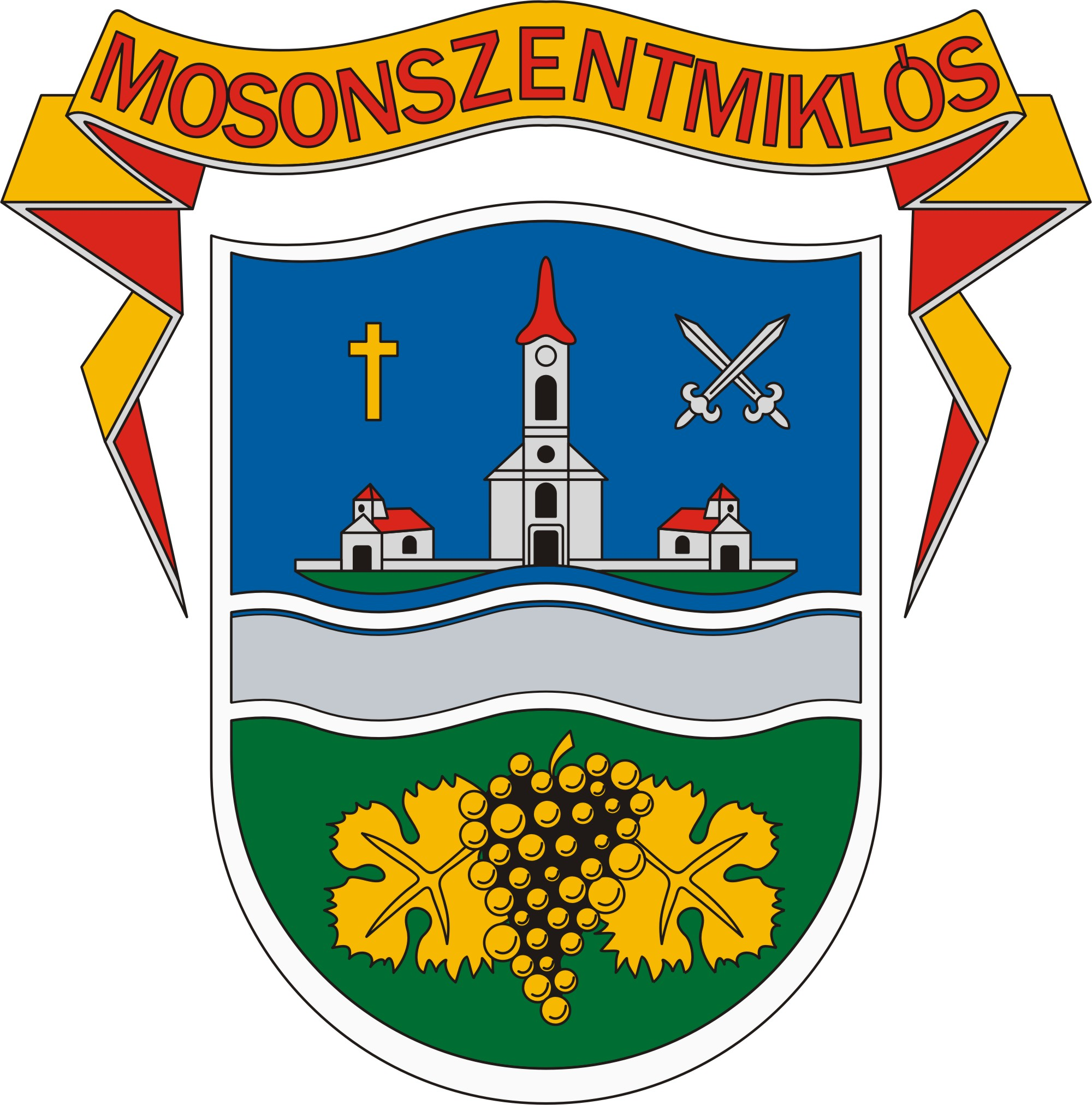
- Coat of arms

- Location of Győr-Moson-Sopron county in Hungary

- Location of Mosonszentmiklós
- Coordinates: 47.72963°N 17.42642°E
- Country: Hungary
- County: Győr-Moson-Sopron

Area
  - Total: 30.71 km^{2} (11.86 sq mi)

Population (2004)
  - Total: 2,451
  - Density: 79.81/km^{2} (206.7/sq mi)
- Time zone: UTC+1 (CET)
  - Summer (DST): UTC+2 (CEST)
- Postal code: 9154
- Area code: 96
- Motorways: M1
- Distance from Budapest: 146 km (91 mi) East

Mosonszentmiklós is a village in Győr-Moson-Sopron county, Hungary.

== Notable people ==
- Iván Hécz
- István Kormos (hu)
- Artúr Nikisch
- József Samodai (hu)
- Damján György Vargha (hu)
