= Sergei Aleksandrovich Zalshupin =

Franco-Russian artist (1898-1900)

Sergei Aleksandrovich Zalshupin (Serge Chubine)
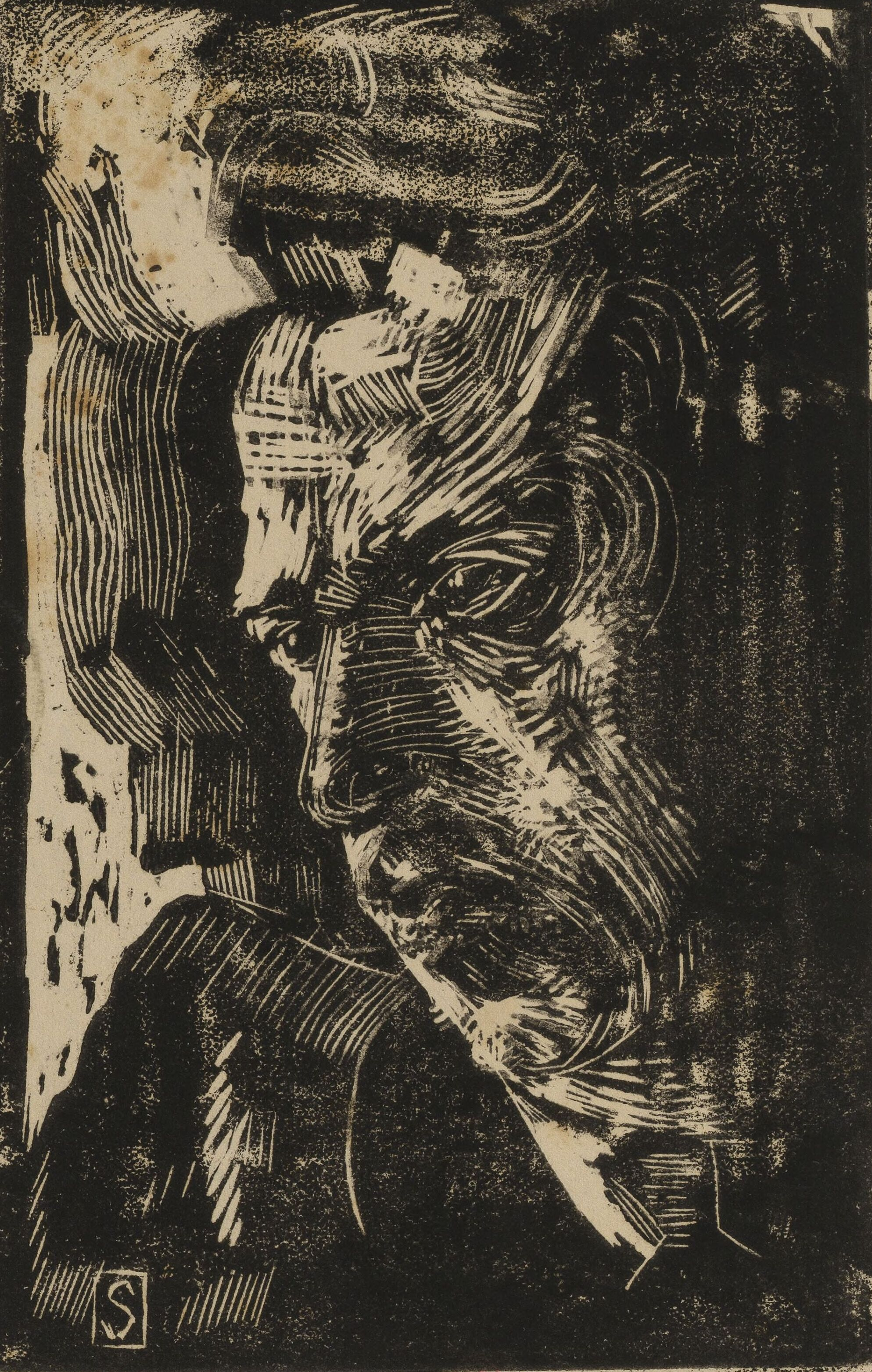
- Self-portrait
- Born: 1898 or 1900; Saint Petersburg
- Died: November 3, 1931; Paris
- Movement: Constructivism

Sergei Aleksandrovich Zalshupin (Serge Zalchoupine, Russian: Сергей Александрович Залшупин, pseudonym Serge Chubine or Serge Choubine, born in 1898 (or 1900), Saint Petersburg - November 3, 1931, Paris) was a Russian and French portraitist, landscape painter, book illustrator and graphic artist.

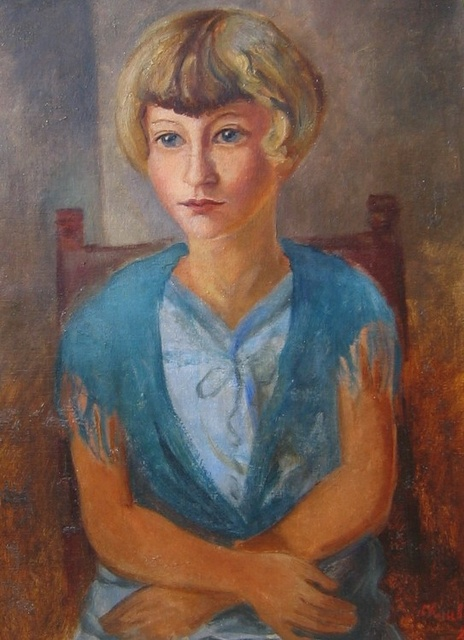
Serge Chubine: Portret of a girl.

== Biography ==
Zalshupin was born in Saint Petersburg as a son of Alexander Semenovich Zalshupin (born 1867- died 1929), publisher of the Энциклопедия банковского дела (Encyclopedia of Banking) and the periodicals Русский экономист (Russian Economist) and Жизнь и суд (Life and Law Court). From 1915 up to 1918 he studied art at the Новая художественная мастерская (New Art Studio) under the painters Vasily Ivanovich Shukhaev (Василий Иванович Шухаев) and Alexandre Yevgenievich Jacovleff (Александр Евгеньевич Яковлев).

In 1921 Zalshupin emigrated to Berlin, where he worked for Russian émigré publications, providing portrait sketches and other illustrations especially to Спо́лох (Spolokh, Russian for Alarm bell). He took part in art exhibitions, such as the Exhibition of Original Drawings of Petrograd Bookplates (1923), and became a member of the board of the Berlin Haus der Kunst. In 1923, the Berlin publishing house Гамаюн (Gamayun) released an album of the artist's etchings, Portraits of Modern Russian Writers, in an edition of 100 copies, which included portraits of Alexander Blok, Andrei Bely, Maxim Gorky, Boris Pilnyak, Ivan Shmelev, and others. That same year, he illustrated the book Alice in Wonderland by Lewis Carroll, translated by Vladimir Nabokov.

In 1924, Zalshupin emigrated again, now to France where he lived in Paris. At the art Salon d'Automne (Autumn Salon) in Paris of 1924 and 1930 he presented his works under the pseudonym Serge Chubine.

He died in 1931 in Paris. Zalshupin's work can be found in Russia in the Pushkin Museum in Moscow.

== Gallery ==
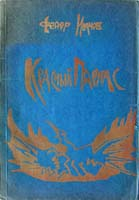
S. Zalshupin: Cover for Fedor Ivanov: Красный Парнасъ (Red Parnassus), 1922. BnF.

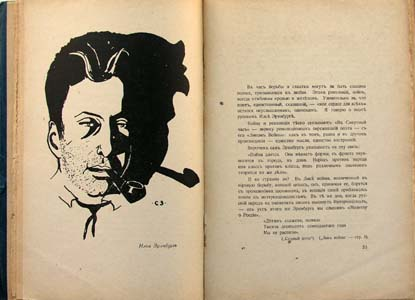
S. Zalshupin: Illustration for Fedor Ivanov: Красный Парнасъ (Red Parnassus), 1922.

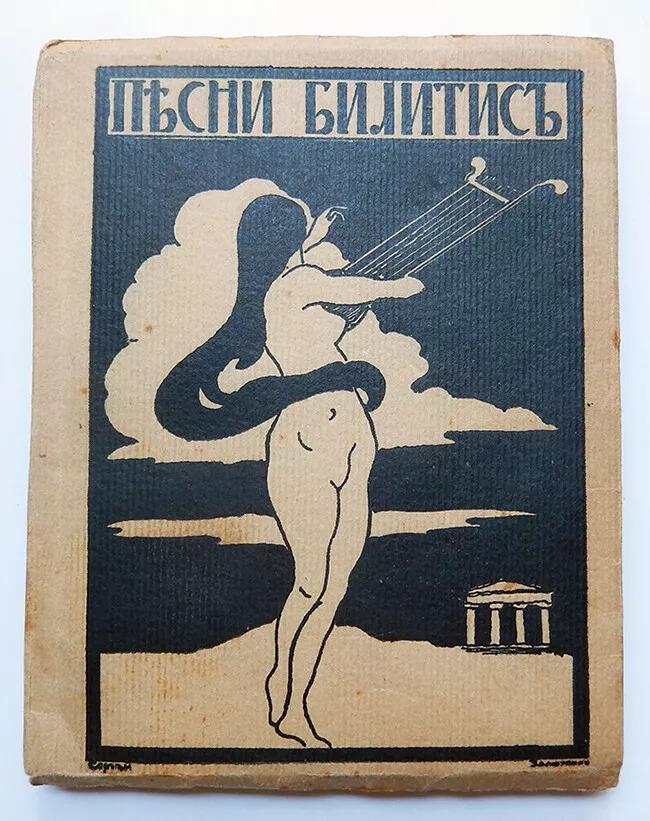
S. Zalshupin: Cover of Песни Билитис (Songs of Bilitis), Berlin, 1922. Russian translation.

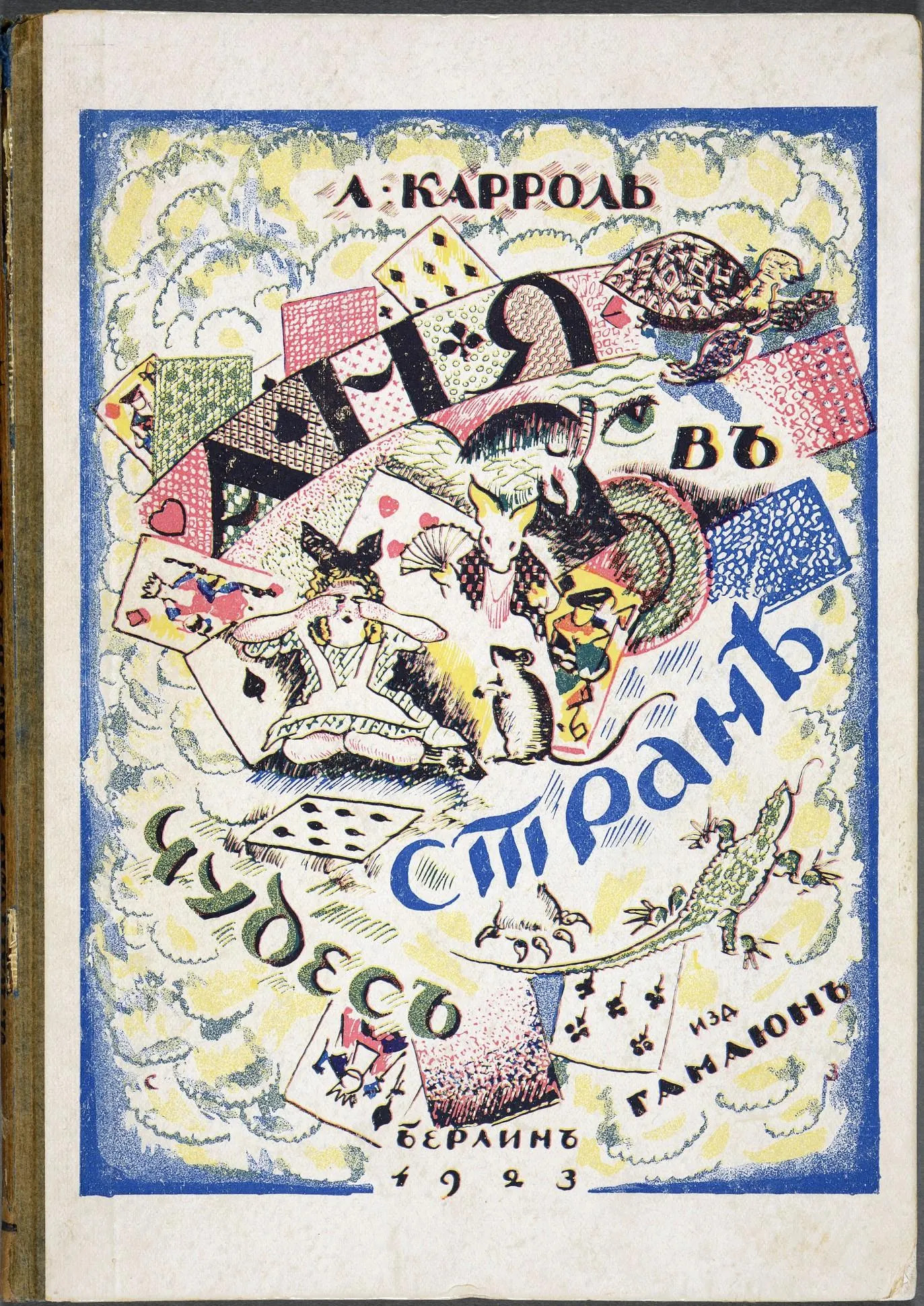
S. Zalshupin: Cover for Аня въ странѣ чудесъ (Anya v stranie chudes, the Russian translation of Lewis Carroll's Alice in Wonderland), 1923.

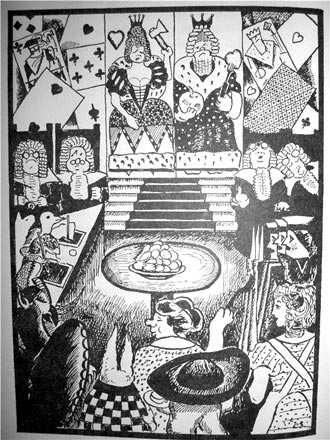
S. Zalshupin: Illustration for the same Russian translation of Alice in Wonderland by Lewis Carroll, 1923.

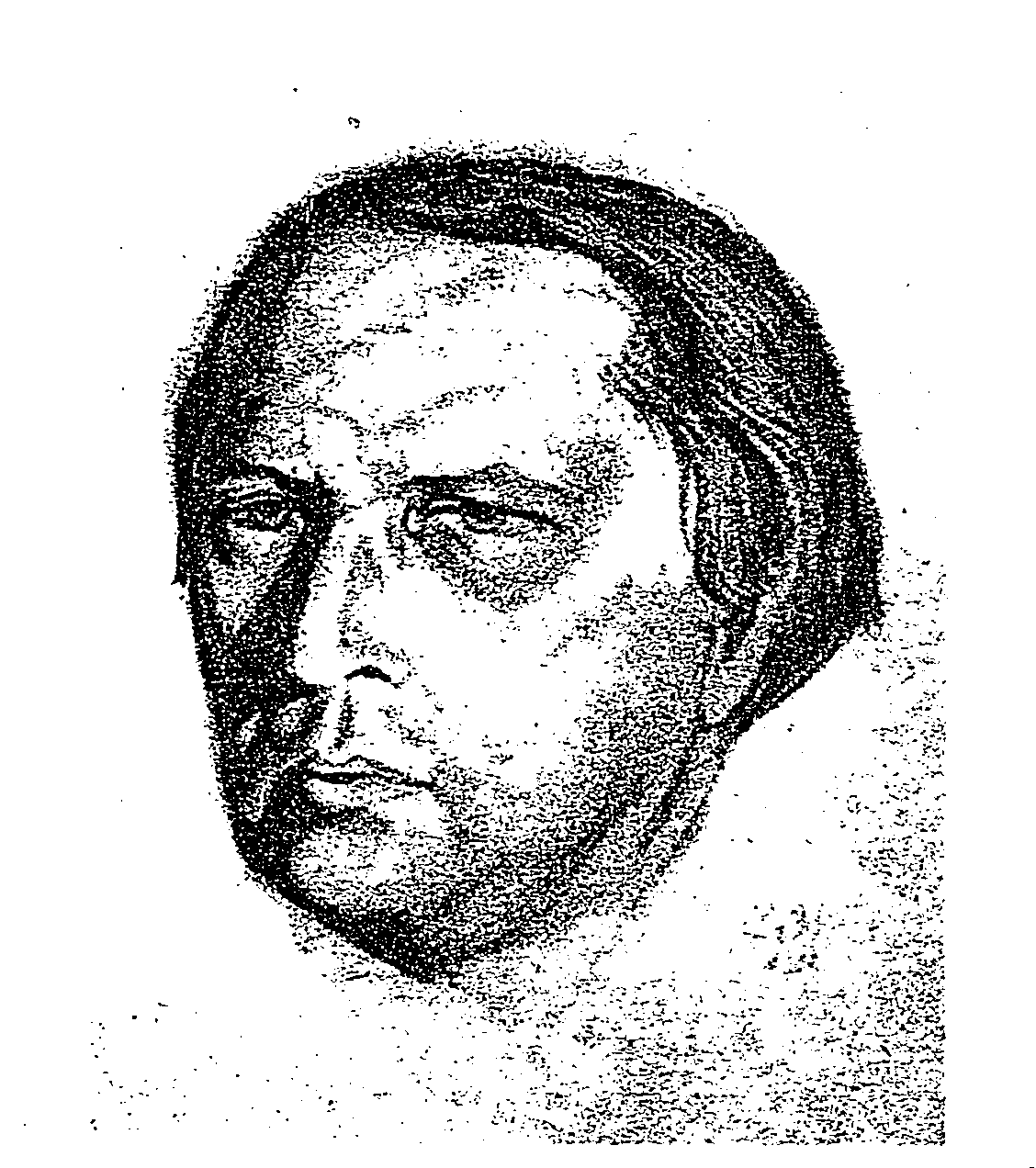
S. Zalshupin: Portrait of author Aleksey Tolstoy, 1923

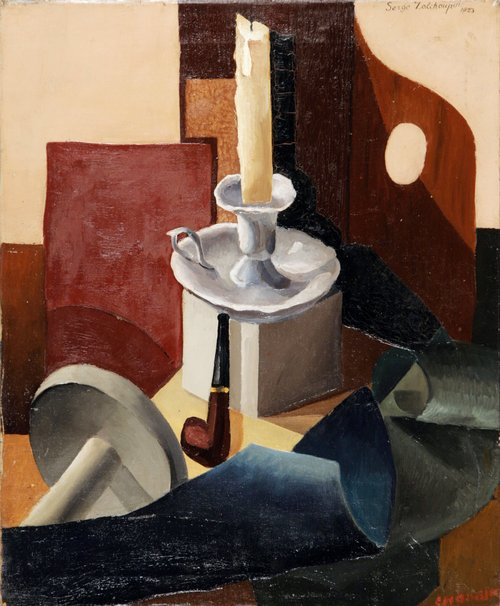
Serge Zalchoupine: Still Life with Pipe, 1923. Oil painting.

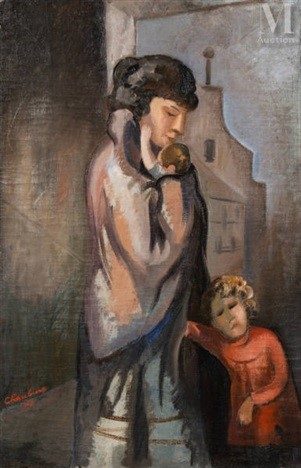
Serge Choubine: Mère et ses enfants (Mother and Her Children), 1927. Oil painting.

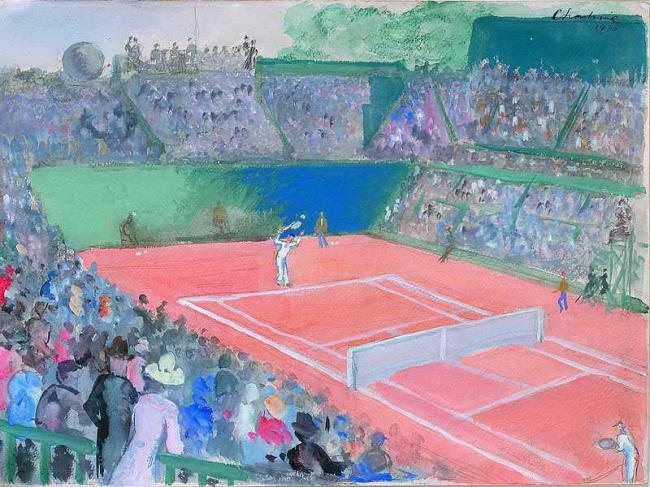
Serge Chubine: La Partie de tennis (The Tennis Match), Roland Garros, 1930. Gouache.

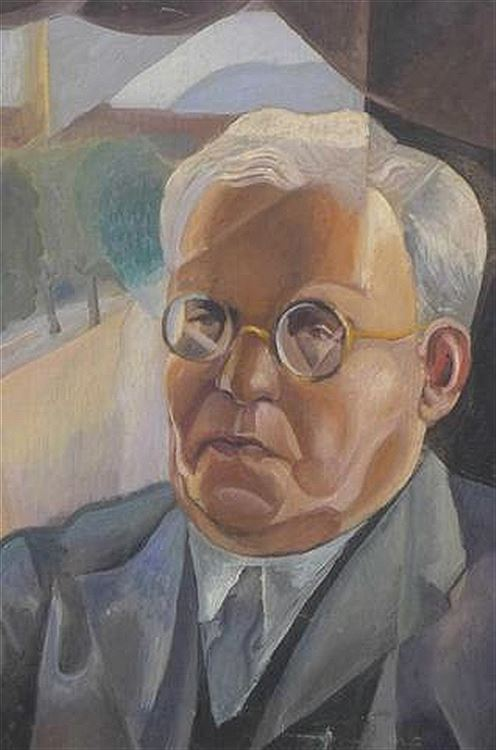
Serge Chubine: Portrait de son père (Portrait of his father).

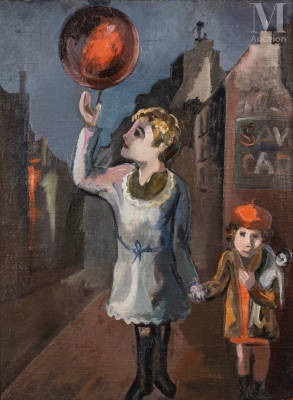
Serge Choubine: Les écoliers parisiens (Parisian Schoolchildren).

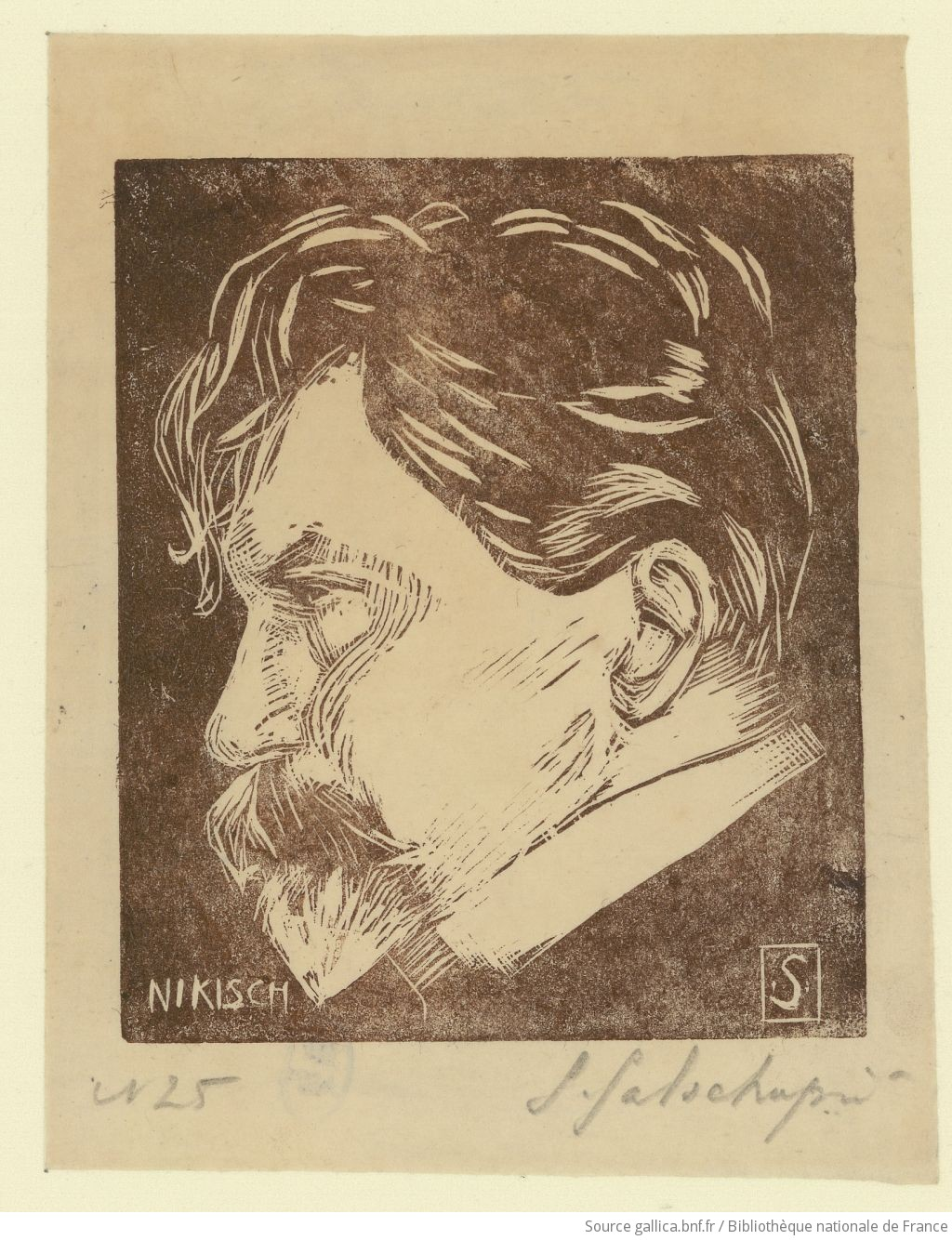
S. Zalshupin: Portrait woodcut of conductor Arthur Nikisch (1855-1922). BnF.

== Work ==
=== Drawings ===
Many drawings by Zalshupin are presented online by Gallica, the digital national library of France BnF.

=== Paintings ===
His paintings include:

- Le joueur de violoncelle, 1923
- Still life with pipe, 1923. Oil on canvas, 59 x 48,5 cm
- Mère et ses enfants, 1927
- Portrait de jeune femme, 1928
- Le port d'Alger, 1929
- Le cabaret, 1929
- Cabaret parisien, 1929
- Place animée, 1930
- Femme aux bras croisés, 1930
- Portrait garçon, aquarelle and gouache, 36x26 cm, 1930
- Femme à la couture, 1931
- Portrait de la femme à la cigarette, 1931
- Sur la terrasse d'un café des boulevards
- Les écuyers
- Les écoliers parisiens
- Portrait du père de l'artiste
- Paysage Urbaine
- Portrait de son père

=== Book illustrations ===
- Песни Билитис [Songs of Bilitis] (in Russian). Illustrated by S.A. Zalshupin. Berlin: Русское универсальное изд-во (Russian Universal Publishing House). 1922.
- Kusikov, Aleksandr Borisovich (1922). V nikuda [To nowhere] (in Russian). Cover by S. Zalshupin. Berlin: Ėpokha. OCLC 1061906255. 73 pages.
- Ивановъ (Ivanov), Федоръ (Fedor) (1922). Красный Парнасъ : литературно-критические очерки / Krasnyĭ Parnas : literaturno-kriticheskie ocherki [Red Parnassus: literary critical essays] (in Russian). Illustrations by S. A. Zalshupin. Berlin: Русское универсальное изд-во, Russkoe universalʹnoe izd-vo (Russian Universal Publishing House). OCLC 2085112. 129 pages.
- Zalshupin, Sergeʹi (1923). Портреты современных русских писателей : оригинальные офорты (Portrety sovremennykh russkikh pisateleĭ : originalʹnye oforty) [Portraits of modern Russian writers: original works] (in Russian). Berlin: Gamai︠u︡n. OCLC 754566494.
- Carroll, L. (1923). Аня въ странѣ чудесъ / Ani︠a︡ v strani︠e︡ chudes (in Russian). Translated by Sirin, V. Illustrated by S. А. Zalshupin. Berlin: Изд-во Гамаюнъ (Izd-vo Gamai︠u︡n). OCLC 6113198. 114 pages. V. Sirin is a pseudonym for V.V. Nabokov.
  - Carroll, Lewis (1976). Аня в странѣ чудес (Anya v stranye chudes). Translated by Sirin, V. Illustrated by S. Zalshupin. New York: Dover. ISBN 9780486233161. OCLC 4197278.

== Literature ==
- Северюхин (Severjuchin), Д.Я. (D.Ja.); Лейкинд (Lejkind), О.Л. (O.L.) (1994). Художники русской эмиграции, 1917-1941 : биографический словарь / Chudožniki russkoj ėmigracii, 1917-1941 : biografičeskij slovarʹ [Artists of the Russian Emigration, 1917-1941: Biographical Dictionary] (in Russian). Saint Petersburg: Izd. Černyševa (Chernyshev Publishing House). ISBN 9785855550184. OCLC 69192854. Pages 204-205.
- Fleishman, L.; Hughes, R.; Raevsky-Hughes, O., eds. (1983). Russkii Berlin 1921-1923. Po Materialam Arkhiva B. I. Nikolaevskogo V Guverovskom Institute [Russian Berlin 1921-1923. Based on the Materials of the Archive of V. I. Nikolaevsky at the Hoover Institution] (in Russian). Paris: YMCA-Press. ISBN 9782850652592. OCLC 54346204. 424 pages.
  - 2003 edition: Fleishman, L.; Hughes, R.; Raevsky-Hughes, O., eds. (2003). Русский Берлин 1921-1923 : по материалам архива Б.И. Николаевского в Гуверовском институте (in Russian). Paris, Moscow: YMCA-Press, Русский Путь. ISBN 9782850652592. OCLC 54346204. 387 pages.
