= Clifton Chenier =

American zydeco musician (1925–1987)

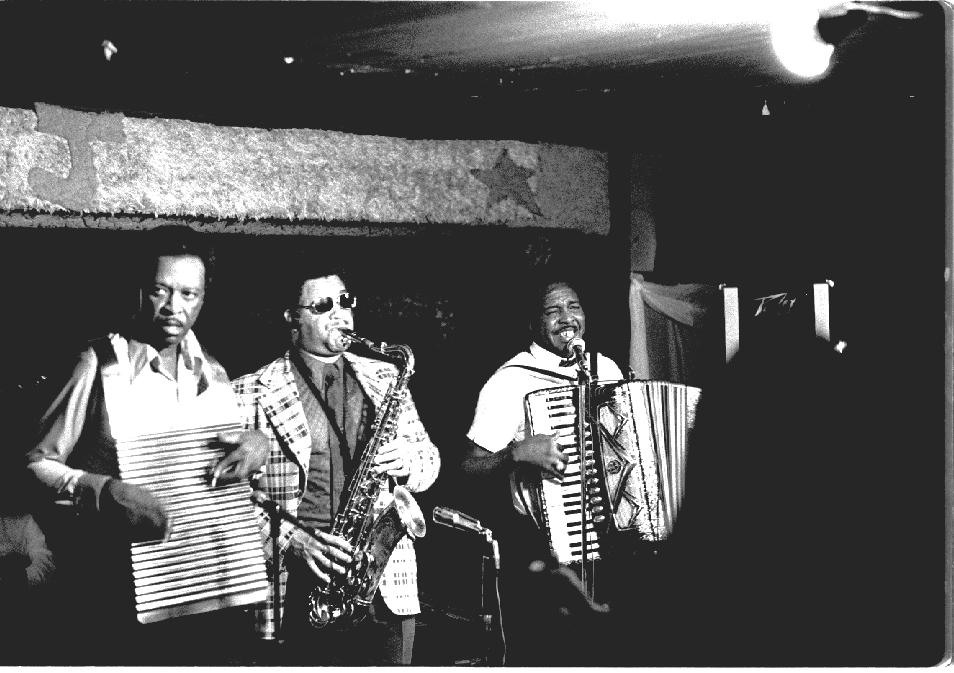
- Chenier Brothers performing at Jay's Lounge and Cockpit, Cankton, Louisiana, Mardi Gras, 1975; Clifton Chenier on accordion, brother Cleveland on washboard and John Hart on tenor saxophone.

Background information
- Born: June 25, 1925; Opelousas, Louisiana, U.S.
- Died: December 12, 1987 (aged 62) Lafayette, Louisiana
- Genres: Zydeco; Cajun; Creole music; R&B; swamp blues
- Occupations: Musician; songwriter
- Instruments: Vocals; accordion; frottoir
- Years active: 1954–1987
- Labels: Elko, Specialty, Arhoolie, Crazy Cajun, Chess, Alligator
- Formerly of: Zydeco Ramblers

Clifton Chenier (June 25, 1925 – December 12, 1987) was an American musician known as a pioneer of zydeco, a style of music that arose from Creole music, with R&B, and blues influences. He sang and played the accordion. Chenier won a Grammy Award in 1983.

Chenier was known as the King of Zydeco, and also billed as the King of the South.

== Biography ==
Chenier was a native of Leonville, Louisiana, near Opelousas. He spoke Louisiana French as a first language.

Chenier was exposed to music growing up, as he accompanied his father, Joseph Chenier, a farmer and player of the single-row diatonic accordion, to dances. His uncle, Morris Chenier, played fiddle. Musical influences that he cited from radio were Muddy Waters, Peetie Wheatstraw, and Lightning Hopkins, while local influences included Creole musicians Claude Faulk, Jesse and ZoZo Reynolds, and Sidney Babineaux. Clifton began playing accordion around 1947, and by 1950 was playing in a club in Basile with his brother Cleveland Chenier on rubboard. Before launching a professional music career, Chenier worked in fields and at a Gulf Oil refinery in Port Arthur, Texas, outside of whose gates he also played music with Cleveland.

Chenier began his recording career in 1954, when he signed with Elko Records and released Cliston Blues [sic], a regional success. Imperial Records picked up and reissued the single and Chenier cut four more sides for their "Post" subsidiary. These early sides were credited to Cliston Chanier. In 1955, he signed with Specialty Records and garnered his first national hit with his label debut "Eh, 'tite Fille" ("Hey, Little Girl", a cover of Professor Longhair's song). The release's national success led to numerous tours with popular rhythm and blues performers such as Ray Charles, Etta James, Chuck Berry, Little Richard, T-Bone Walker, and Lowell Fulson. He also toured in the early days with Clarence Garlow, billed as the Two Crazy Frenchmen. Chenier was signed with Chess Records in Chicago, followed by the Arhoolie label in the early 1960s. Arhoolie gave Chenier exposure to new audiences of blues and rock listeners across the US.

In April 1966, Chenier appeared at the Berkeley Blues Festival on the University of California campus and was subsequently described by Ralph J. Gleason, jazz critic of the San Francisco Chronicle, as "one of the most surprising musicians I have heard in some time, with a marvelously moving style of playing the accordion ... blues accordion, that's right, blues accordion." Over time, the band expanded to include saxophone and organ, and electric effects pedals, with all melody instruments taking turns at solos.

Chenier was the first act to play at Antone's, a blues club on Sixth Street in Austin, Texas. In 1976, he reached a national audience by appearing on the first season of the PBS music program Austin City Limits. In 1979 he returned to the show with his Red Hot Louisiana Band.

Chenier's popularity peaked in the 1980s, and he was recognized with a Grammy Award in 1983 for his album I'm Here! It was the first Grammy for his new label Alligator Records. Chenier followed Queen Ida as the second Louisiana Creole to win a Grammy.

Chenier is credited with redesigning the wood and crimped tin washboard into the vest frottoir, an instrument that easily hung from the shoulders. He sketched his idea for a metalworker in Port Arthur named Willie Landry, who made the first frottoir. Cleveland Chenier, Clifton's older brother, also played in the Red Hot Louisiana Band. He found popularity for his ability to manipulate the distinctive sound of the frottoir by rubbing several bottle openers (held in each hand) along its ridges. During their prime, Chenier and his band traveled throughout the world.

=== Death ===
Chenier suffered from diabetes, which eventually forced him to have a foot amputated and required dialysis because of associated kidney problems. He died of diabetes-related kidney disease in December 1987 age of 62 at Lafayette General Hospital in Lafayette, Louisiana. A lifelong Catholic, Chenier was funeralized at Immaculate Heart of Mary Catholic Church in Lafayette. Young accordionist Corey Arceneaux served as an altar boy at his funeral. He is buried in All Souls Cemetery in Loreauville.

== Legacy and tributes ==
Since 1987, his son C. J. Chenier (born Clayton Joseph Thompson) has carried on the zydeco tradition by touring with Chenier's band and recording albums. Clifton Chenier's bandmate and protégé Buckwheat Zydeco achieved national success playing the piano accordion.

Paul Simon mentioned Chenier in his song "That Was Your Mother" on his 1986 album Graceland, calling him the "King of the Bayou." Rory Gallagher wrote a song in tribute to Chenier, "The King of Zydeco" on his last studio album Fresh Evidence (1990). Sonny Landreth recalls growing up on the rhythm of Clifton and Cleveland and the Red Hot Louisiana Band in South of I-10, song title and name of the album released in 1995. John Mellencamp refers to "Clifton" in his song "Lafayette", about the Louisiana city where Chenier often performed, on Mellencamp's 2003 album Trouble No More. Zachary Richard mentions Chenier in his song "Clif's Zydeco" (on Richard's 2012 album Le Fou). The Squeezebox Stompers' "Zydeco Train" says, "Clifton Chenier, he's the engineer."

The jam band Phish often covers Chenier's song "My Soul" in live performances. Chenier is the subject of Les Blank's 1973 documentary film Hot Pepper.

In 2025, to honor Chenier on what would have been his 100th birthday, Valcour Records issued A Tribute to the King of Zydeco, a recording with 12 newly-recorded tracks by artists such as the Rolling Stones, Steve Earle, Taj Mahal, Lucinda Williams, David Hidalgo and Molly Tuttle. The album won the 2026 Grammy Award in the Best Regional Roots Music Album category.

== Awards and honors ==
Chenier received a 1984 National Heritage Fellowship from the National Endowment for the Arts, the U.S. government's highest honor in folk and traditional arts. He was inducted posthumously into the Blues Hall of Fame in 1989, and the Louisiana Music Hall of Fame in 2011. In 2014, he received a Grammy Lifetime Achievement Award.

In 2016, the Library of Congress deemed Chenier's album Bogalusa Boogie to be "culturally, historically, or aesthetically significant" and selected it for preservation in the National Recording Registry.

== Discography ==
=== Early singles ===
- Louisiana Stomp / Cliston Blues (as Cliston Chanier) (Elko 920, 1954)
- Louisiana Stomp / Cliston Blues (as Cliston Chanier) (Imperial 5352, 5/55) reissue
- Rockin' The Bop / Country Bred (as Cliston Chanier) (Post 2010, 1955)
- Rockin' Hop / Tell Me (as Cliston Chanier) (Post 2016, 1955)
- Ay-Tete Fee (Eh 'tite Fille) [= Hey Little Girl] / Boppin' The Rock (Specialty 552, 5/55)
- The Things I Did For You / Think It Over (Specialty 556, 8/55)
- Squeeze Box Boogie / The Cat's Dreamin' (Specialty 568, 1/56)
- Where Can My Baby Be / The Big Wheel (Argo 5262, 2/57)
- Standing On The Corner / The Big Wheel (Argo 5262, 2/57) there are two issues of Argo 5262, one with "Standing On The Corner" as the A-side, the other showing "Where Can My Baby Be" as the A-side; they are the same song (with the same matrix number) under two different titles.
- Sloppy / My Soul (Argo 5289, 1/58)
- It Happened So Fast / Goodbye Baby (Zynn 506, 1958)
- Worried Life Blues / Hey Ma Ma (Zynn 1004, 1959)
- Night & Day, My Love / Rockin' Accordion (Zynn 1011, 1959)
- Bajou Drive (Sloppy) / My Soul (Checker 939, 12/59) reissue
- Ay Ai Ai / Why Did You Go Last Night (Arhoolie 506, 1964)
- Hot Rod / Louisiana Blues (Arhoolie 509, 1965)
- Zydeco Et Pas Sale / I Can Look Down At Your Woman (Arhoolie 511, 1965)
- Keep On Scratching / It's Hard (Arhoolie 518, 1966)

=== Albums ===
- Louisiana Blues and Zydeco (Arhoolie 1024, 3/66)
- Bon Ton Roulet! (Arhoolie 1031, 5/67)
- Bayou Soul (Crazy Cajun 1002, 1967; Maison de Soul 1002, 1976) compilation of Huey P. Meaux produced material
- Black Snake Blues (Arhoolie 1038, 4/69)
- Clifton Chenier's Very Best (Blue Thumb BTS-15, 1969) compilation of Arhoolie material from first 3 albums: 1024/1031/1038
- King of the Bayous (Arhoolie 1052, 1970)
- Bayou Blues (Specialty 2139, 1971) compilation of Specialty material
- Live (At St. Mark's) (Arhoolie 1059, 11/72)
- Out West (Arhoolie 1072, 1974)
- Bogalusa Boogie (Arhoolie 1076, 1976)
- Frenchin' the Boogie (Blue Star [Fr] 80.608, 1976; Verve 519724, 1993)
- Boogie in Black & White with Rod Bernard (Jin 9014, 1976)
- Boogie 'N' Zydeco (Maison de Soul 1003, 1977; Sonet SNTF-801, 1979) recorded 11/19/75
- Clifton Chenier and His Red Hot Louisiana Band (Arhoolie 1078, 8/78)
- Cajun Swamp Music Live (Recorded at the Montreux Festival 1977) (Tomato 7002, 1978) 2-LP
- In New Orleans (GNP Crescendo 2119, 1978)
- Classic Clifton (Arhoolie 1082, 1980) compilation of Arhoolie material from all 8 albums
- The King of Zydeco (Live At Montreux) (Arhoolie 1086, 1981) recorded 7/12/75
- I'm Here! (Alligator 4729; Sonet SNTF-882, 1982)
- Country Boy Now Grammy Award Winner 1984! (Caillier 8401, 1984; Maison de Soul 1012, 1985; Ace CDCH-234, 1988)
- Live at the San Francisco Blues Festival (Arhoolie 1093, 1985) recorded 9/12/82
- Black Snake Blues (Arhoolie 1038, 1986 re-press with 2 tracks added on; uses same part number)
- Sings the Blues (Arhoolie 1097, 1987) recorded 4/01/69
- Clifton Chenier – 60 Minutes With the King of Zydeco (Arhoolie CD-301, 1988) reissue of Arhoolie 1082, plus 3 bonus tracks
- Live! At the Long Beach and San Francisco Blues Festivals (Arhoolie CD-404, 1993) includes an entire previously unreleased performance at the 1983 Long Beach Blues Festival, plus the reissue of Arhoolie 1093
- Zydeco Dynamite: The Clifton Chenier Anthology (Rhino R2-71194, 1993) 2-CD
- Squeezebox Boogie (Recorded at the Rising Sun Club, Montreal / August 1978) (Just A Memory/Justin Time JAM-9141, 1999)
- Live! At Grant Street (Arhoolie CD-487, 2000) recorded 4/28/81
- Clifton Chenier's Rockin' Accordion: A Selection of His Earliest Recordings 1954–1960 (Jasmine JASMCD-3046, 2015)
- Clifton Chenier And His Red Hot Louisiana Band Live At Tipitina's / June 7, 1980 (501/Tipitina's Record Club TRC-0306, 2023)

== See also ==
- List of Grammy Hall of Fame Award recipients (A–D)
- Honorific nicknames in popular music
