= I'm Here! (album) =

Studio album by Clifton Chenier
- Released: 1982
- Genre: Zydeco
- Label: Alligator
- Producer: Sam Charters

Clifton Chenier chronology
The King of Zydeco (1981)	I'm Here! (1982)	Country Boy Now Grammy Award Winner 1984! (1984)

I'm Here! is an album by the American musician Clifton Chenier. It was released in 1982 via Alligator Records. Alligator licensed the album in the hope that label head Bruce Iglauer could produce the follow-up. Chenier is credited with His Red Hot Louisiana Band. I'm Here! won a Grammy Award for "Best Ethnic or Traditional Folk Recording". It was the label's first Grammy win. The album was reissued in 1993.

== Production ==
The album was produced by Sam Charters. Recorded in Bogalusa, Louisiana, the album was completed by Chenier and his band in eight hours. Chenier's brother Cleveland played the frottoir. Chenier made more use of horns than on previous albums, due to his dialysis treatments weakening his accordion playing.

== Critical reception ==
Professional ratings
Review scores
Source	Rating
AllMusic	3/5 stars
Robert Christgau	B
The Encyclopedia of Popular Music	4/5 stars
MusicHound Folk: The Essential Album Guide	3.5/5 stars
The Penguin Guide to Blues Recordings	3/4 stars
The Philadelphia Inquirer	4/5 stars
The Rolling Stone Album Guide	4.5/5 stars

Robert Christgau called I'm Here! the "first record I've ever heard hot enough to convince me that all those wild tales about the accordion man weren't so much pepper sauce." The Journal News deemed it "first class zydeco," writing that Chenier "sings with more gusto and his band sounds tighter" on record. The Philadelphia Inquirer praised "the funkiest accordion you'll ever hear" and labeled the disc a "prime party album." The Clarion-Ledger noted Warren Ceasar's trumpet, admiring his "searing upper-register notes and triple-time tonguing" on "I'm the Zydeco Man".

AllMusic wrote: "The music bumps and grooves in all the ways it's supposed to. One of the songs dates the album a bit ('Zydeco Disco'), but aside from that one, the rest of the album is pretty much straightforward zydeco and blues."

== Track listing ==
No.	Title	Length
1.	"I'm the Zydeco Man"
2.	"Dry Your Eyes"
3.	"Zydeco Disco"
4.	"I'm Here!"
5.	"The New Zydeco"
6.	"You Got Me Crying"
7.	"Going Back Home"
8.	"Eighteen Long Years"
9.	"In the Mood"
10.	"Got to Have Your Love"
