= Bogalusa Boogie =

Studio album by Clifton Chenier
- Released: 1975
- Studio: Studio in the Country
- Genre: Zydeco
- Label: Arhoolie
- Producer: Chris Strachwitz

Clifton Chenier chronology
Out West (1972)	Bogalusa Boogie (1975)	The King of Zydeco Live at Montreux (1975)

Bogalusa Boogie is a studio album by the American zydeco musician Clifton Chenier. It was released in 1975 via Arhoolie Records. The album was inducted into the Grammy Hall of Fame in 2011. In 2016, the album was inducted into the Library of Congress' National Recording Registry.

== Production ==
The album was produced by Chris Strachwitz, and was recorded at the Studio in the Country, in Bogalusa, Louisiana. Chenier was backed by his Red Hot Louisiana Band. Chenier sang partly in English and in Creole.

== Critical reception ==
Professional ratings
Review scores
Source	Rating
AllMusic	4/5 stars
Robert Christgau	B+
The Encyclopedia of Popular Music	4/5 stars
MusicHound Folk: The Essential Album Guide	4/5 stars
The Rolling Stone Album Guide	5/5 stars

Robert Christgau wrote: "Crisp, spirited, with John Hart's tenor sax applying a crucial boot in the ass to each side and Cleveland C. rubbing his board to beat the band, this is where Clifton C. finally gets one of his famous parties onto a record."

AllMusic thought that "the medium tempo blues numbers such as 'Quelque Chose Sur Mon Idee' are really beautiful, while the instrumental 'Ride 'Em Cowboy' is simply lots of fun, the honking tenor sax and clickety-clacking rubboard riding high in the saddle." The Rolling Stone Album Guide deemed the album "a near-flawless recording." The Washington Post called it "probably the best zydeco album of all time," writing that "like Muddy Waters's 1954 group, Chenier's 1975 ensemble is one of the great bands in American history, and they rip through this set without taking any prisoners."

== Track listing ==
No.	Title	Length
1.	"One Step at a Time"	4:20
2.	"Sa M'Appel Fou (They Call Me Crazy)"	3:00
3.	"Quelque Chose Sur Mon Idee (Something on My Mind)"	4:00
4.	"Ride 'Em Cowboy"	2:30
5.	"Ma Mama Ma Dit (My Mama Told Me)"	3:25
6.	"Je Me Reveiller Ce Matin (I Woke Up This Morning)"	3:10
7.	"Allons a Grand Coteau"	3:10
8.	"Je Suis en Recolteur (I'm a Farmer)"	4:50
9.	"Ti Na Na"	2:12
10.	"Come Go Along with Me"	4:55
11.	"Bogalusa Boogie"	3:15

== Personnel ==
- Clifton Chenier – piano accordion
- Cleveland Chenier – rub board
- John Hart – tenor sax
- Robert St. Julian – drums
- Joe Brouchet – bass
- Paul Senegal – guitar
