= Friedrich Kark =

German conductor

Friedrich Kark (13 August 1869 in Ottensen near Altona – 18 June 1939 in Berlin) was a German conductor who conducted the first recording of Beethoven's Fifth Symphony in 1910.

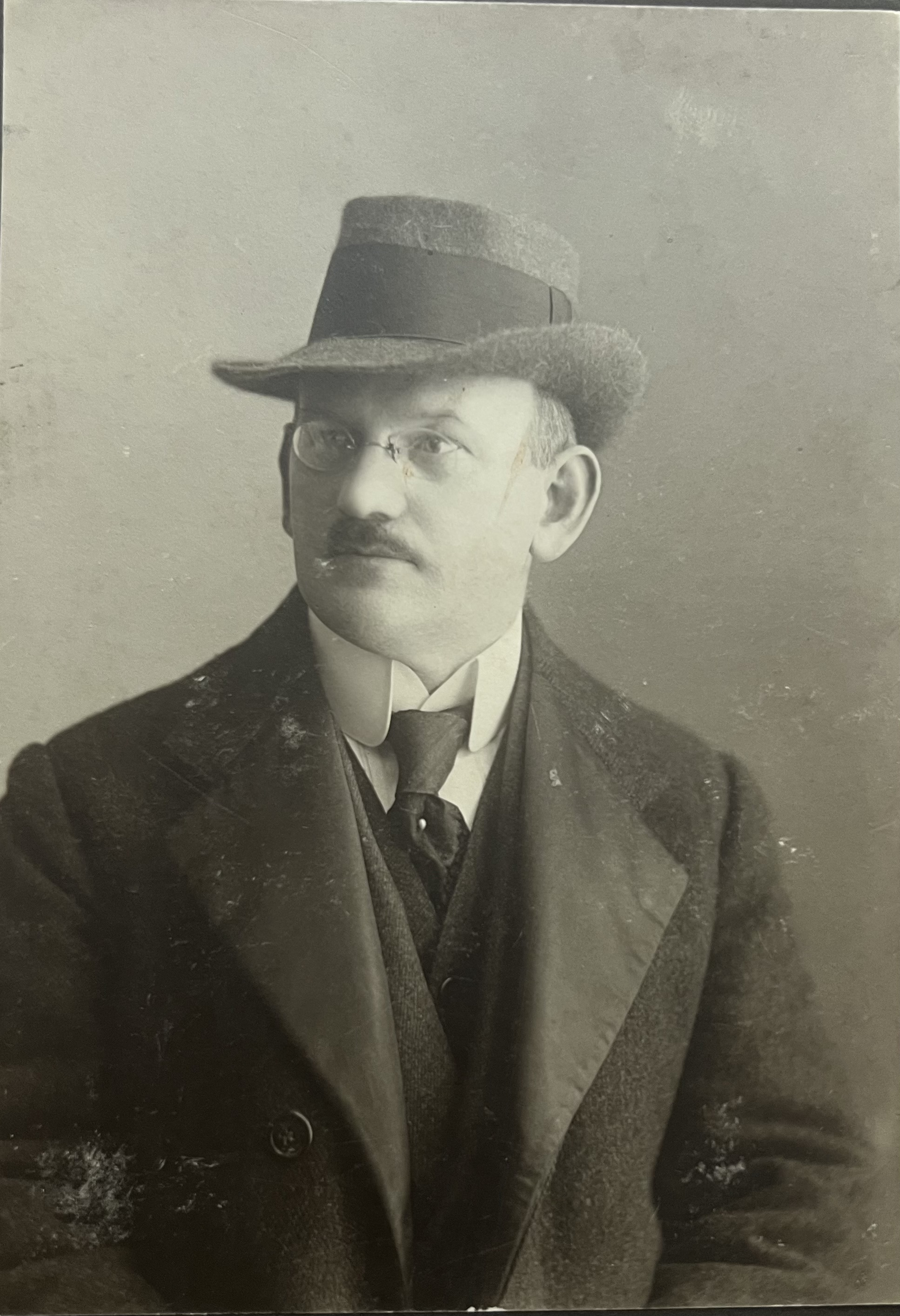
Porträt des Musikers und Dirigenten Friedrich Kark († 1939).
