= Arthur Nikisch =

Hungarian conductor (1855–1922)

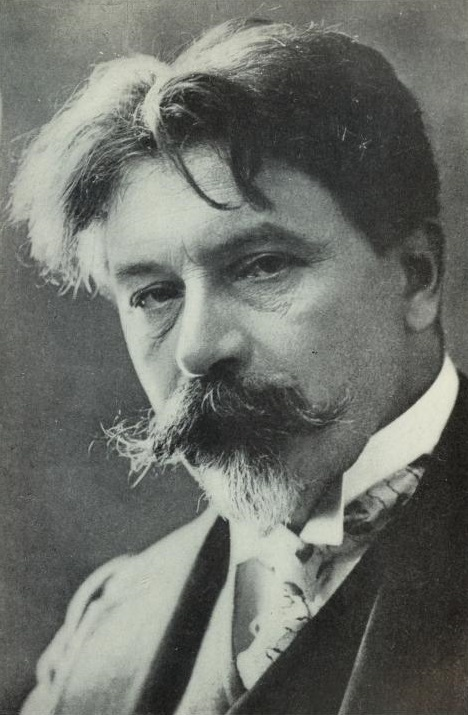
Arthur Nikisch.

Arthur Nikisch (12 October 1855 – 23 January 1922) was a Hungarian conductor who performed internationally, holding posts in Boston, London, Leipzig and—most importantly—Berlin. He was considered an outstanding interpreter of the music of Bruckner, Tchaikovsky, Beethoven and Liszt. Johannes Brahms praised Nikisch's performance of his Fourth Symphony as "quite exemplary, it's impossible to hear it any better."

== Biography ==
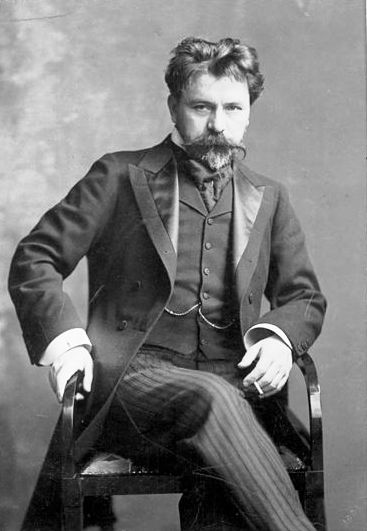
Nicola Perscheid: Arthur Nikisch in 1901.

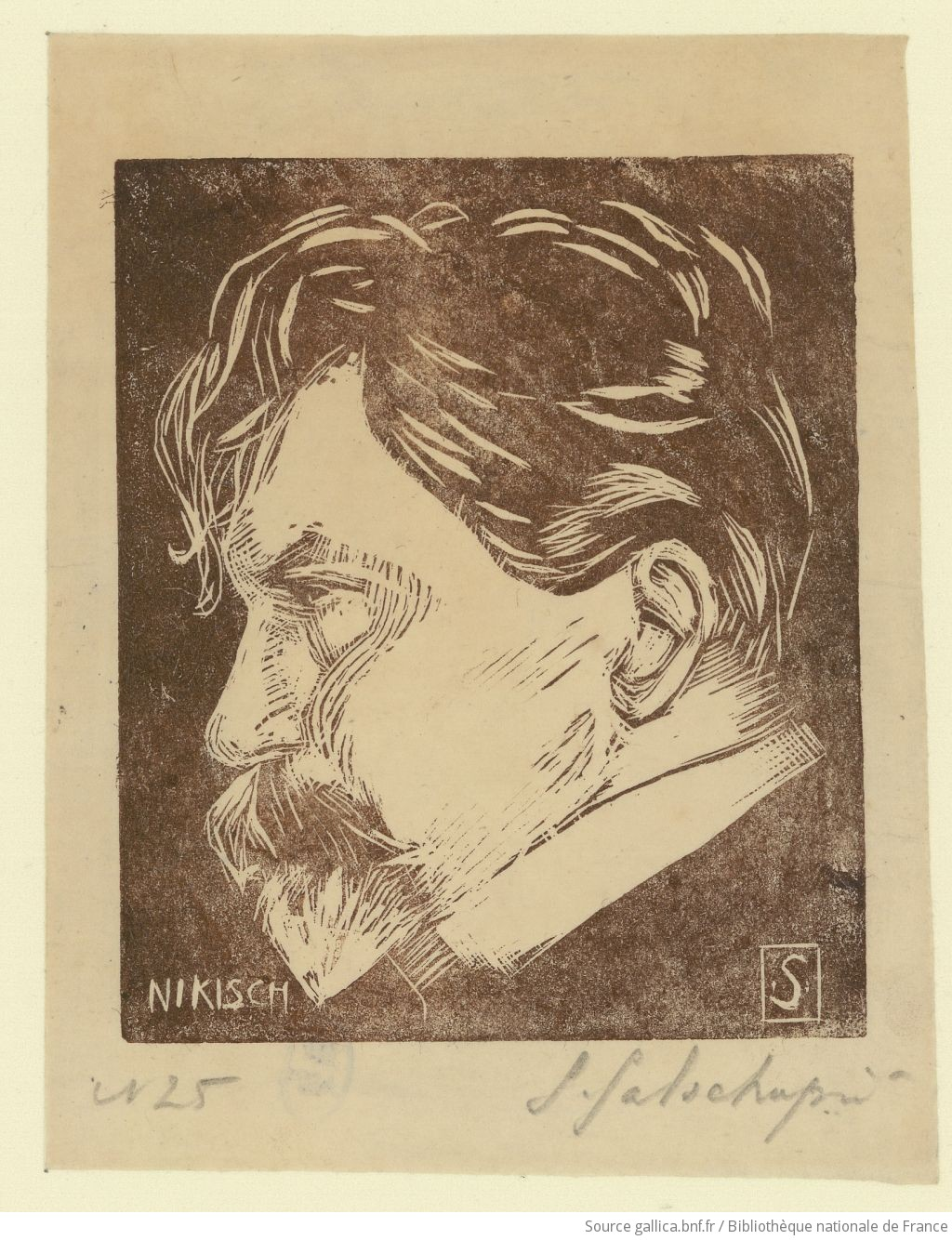
Sergei Aleksandrovich Zalshupin: Portrait of Arthur Nikisch. Undated woodcut, BnF.

Arthur Augustinus Adalbertus Nikisch was born in Mosonszentmiklós, Hungary, to a Hungarian father and a mother from Moravia.

Nikisch was considered a musical prodigy from a young age; he made a public piano performance at the age of eight. In 1866, he began his studies at the Vienna Conservatory. There he studied under the composer Felix Otto Dessoff, the conductor Johann von Herbeck, and the violinist Joseph Hellmesberger, Jr. and won prizes for composition and performance on violin and piano. He was engaged as a violinist in the Vienna Philharmonic, and also played in the Bayreuth Festival orchestra in its inaugural season of 1876.

He achieved most of his fame as a conductor. In 1878 he moved to Leipzig and became second conductor of the Leipzig Opera; in 1879 he was promoted to principal conductor. He gave the premiere of Anton Bruckner's Symphony No. 7 with the Leipzig Gewandhaus Orchestra in 1884. On 1 July 1885 Nikisch married Amélie Heussner (1862–1938), a singer and actress, who had been engaged the preceding years at the Kassel court theatre with Gustav Mahler. Their son Mitja (1899–1936) would become a noted pianist in his own right.

Nikisch later became conductor of the Boston Symphony Orchestra (BSO). On December 20, 1889, he led the BSO in a concert to open the newly built Lincoln Music Hall in Washington, D.C. From 1893 to 1895 director of the Royal Opera in Budapest. In 1895 he succeeded Carl Reinecke as director of the Leipzig Gewandhaus Orchestra. In the same year he became principal conductor of the Berlin Philharmonic, and held both positions until his death.

His successor at the Leipzig Gewandhaus Orchestra was his scholar and first violinist Albert Heinig. Nikisch was also a popular guest conductor with the Vienna Philharmonic and Concertgebouw Orchestra of Amsterdam, and conducted the Ring Cycle of Richard Wagner at Covent Garden in London. Nikisch also served as director of the Leipzig Conservatory from 1902 and there taught a class in conducting.

In 1921 Nikisch conducted several concerts at the Teatro Colón in Buenos Aires. In some of these concerts his son, the pianist Mitja Nikisch, then 22, was the soloist.

He was a pioneer in several ways. In April 1912 he took the London Symphony Orchestra to the United States, a first for a European orchestra.

On 10 November 1913, Nikisch made one of the earliest recordings of a complete symphony, Beethoven's 5th, with the Berlin Philharmonic, a performance later reissued on LP and CD by DGG and other modern labels. He also made a series of early recordings with the London Symphony Orchestra, some of which display the portamento characteristic of early-20th century playing.

== Death ==
Nikisch died in Leipzig in 1922, and was buried there. Immediately after his death, the square where he had lived was renamed Nikischplatz, and in 1971 the city created the Arthur Nikisch Prize for young conductors.

== Legacy ==
Nikisch's style of conducting, with deep analysis of the score, a simple beat, and a charisma that let him bring out the full sonority of the orchestra and plumb the depths of the music, helped establish a new standard in the world of conducting.

His aforementioned conducting style was greatly admired by Leopold Stokowski, Arturo Toscanini, Sir Adrian Boult, Fritz Reiner, Ervin Nyiregyházi, and many others, including George Szell, who called Nikisch "an orchestral wizard." Reiner said, "It was [Nikisch] who told me that I should never wave my arms in conducting, and that I should use my eyes to give cues."

Henry Wood wrote, "I remember... his marvellous way of listening so intently to every phrase he directed.... When rehearsing a melody, he invariably sang it to the orchestra with great emotional feeling – and then would say: 'Now play it as you feel it.' No conductor that I have heard has ever surpassed his emotional feeling and dramatic intensity."

Arthur Nikisch had a huge impact on Wilhelm Furtwängler. The latter always considered Nikisch as his single model. Nikisch supported Furtwängler at the beginning of his career and predicted that he would be his successor.

A film survives of Nikisch conducting; after seeing it Herbert von Karajan described how impressed he was by Nikisch's use of his eyes instead of hand motions.
