= Going Back Home (Frankie Lee album) =

Studio album by Frankie Lee
- Released: 1994
- Genres: Blues, soul
- Label: Blind Pig
- Producer: Bobby Murray

Frankie Lee chronology
| Sooner or Later (1992) | Going Back Home (1994) | Here I Go Again (1999) |

Going Back Home is an album by the American musician Frankie Lee, released in 1994. He supported it with a North American tour.

== Production ==
Lee was disinterested in recording an album of strictly blues songs, preferring to incorporate soul, jazz, and R&B sounds; he recognized that his live audiences were mostly college-age attendees. He used three different bands during the recording sessions. Bobby Murray coproduced and played guitar; Lady Bianca contributed on vocals. "Ain't That Peculiar" is a cover of the Smokey Robinson song. "The Love You Save Today" was written by Joe Tex. "Let the Good Times Roll" is a version of the Sam Cooke song.

== Critical reception ==
Professional ratings
Review scores
| Source | Rating |
|---|---|
| All Music Guide to the Blues | 3/5 stars |
| Edmonton Journal | 3/4 stars |
| MusicHound Blues: The Essential Album Guide | 2.5/5 stars |
| The North County Blade-Citizen | B+ |
| Oakland Tribune | 3/4 stars |

The Chicago Tribune said, "Combining smoldering soul and tasty contemporary blues, the disc brilliantly showcases both sides of Lee's musical persona"; the paper later listed Going Back Home as the eighth best blues album of the year. The Boston Herald noted the Lee "doesn't dazzle with blazing originality, but confidently ranges from his southern soul base to embrace downhome blues and Motown classics." The Los Angeles Daily News called Lee a "competent" crooner but panned the "big time production". The Argus Leader praised his "smooth uptown soul voice, as well as his back-alley growl."

== Track listing ==
| No. | Title | Length |
|---|---|---|
| 1. | "Finders Keepers" |
| 2. | "Too Busy Thinking About My Baby" |
| 3. | "One Stone at a Time" |
| 4. | "What's the Matter Baby" |
| 5. | "Don't Make Me Cry" |
| 6. | "Got to Keep On Movin'" |
| 7. | "Let the Good Times Roll" |
| 8. | "The Love You Save Today" |
| 9. | "Ain't That Peculiar" |
| 10. | "Rock My Soul" |
| 11. | "Goin' Back Home" |
| 12. | "Party Down" |
