= Black Gospel music =

Genre of music

Black gospel music
- Stylistic origins: Work songs; Christian hymns; Spirituals; Gospel
- Cultural origins: Late 18th – early 19th century, Southern United States
- Typical instruments: Hammond organ; tambourines; drums; bass guitar; electric guitar; keyboards

Subgenres
- Urban contemporary gospel

Black gospel music, often called gospel music or simply gospel, is the traditional music of the Black diaspora in the United States. It is rooted in the musical practices of enslaved Africans such as call-and-response, polyrhythmic patterns, and what is now considered Blues harmony and form. It is also the liturgical music of the Historic Black Church. During the 1960s era in the South, it was described as the "soundtrack of the struggle for civil rights", helping create unity and faith for the work.

As a popular form of commercial music, Black gospel was revolutionized in the 1930s by Thomas Dorsey, the "father of gospel music", who is credited with composing more than 1,000 gospel songs, including "Take My Hand, Precious Lord" and "Peace in the Valley". Dorsey also created the first gospel choir and sold millions of copies of his recordings nationwide. The Pilgrim Baptist Church in Chicago, Dorsey's home church, is currently in development as the National Museum of Gospel Music.

== History ==
=== Background: 18th century–late 19th century ===
Black gospel music has roots in the Black oral tradition—the passing down of history via the spoken word rather than in writing. Griots performed in West Africa. In colonial America, where enslaved Africans were prevented from being formally educated, oral and otherwise non-written communication became the method not only for cultural patrimony, but for virtually all communication.

Some of this communication (including work songs sung in the fields) was used to organize, including plans for retaliation against their enslavers and for escape. This eventually led to the banning of drums in many parts of colonial America, as well as other instruments related to West African patrimony.

As such, most Black churches relied on hand- clapping and foot-stomping as rhythmic accompaniment. West African dance and ring shout traditions developed among early Black Christians into shouting, in which fast-paced gospel music is accompanied by equally rapid (often frenzied) dancing.(In its modern form, this is also known as a "praise break".) This, along with the repetition and "call and response" elements familiar to West African music, helped to engender an ecstatic, trance-like state and to strengthen communal bonds. These elements also enabled illiterate members the opportunity to participate.

Useful in the fields and in the church house, Negro spirituals (and the traditions associated with them) were the earliest form of Black gospel. In 1867, a compendium of slave songs titled Slaves Songs of the United States was issued by a group of Northern abolitionists. It is also the first such collection of African-American music of any kind, and included a number of early Black gospel songs, including "Down in the River to Pray" (then titled "The Good Old Way").

In 1871, the Fisk Jubilee Singers were formed, an a-cappella Black gospel ensemble formed to fundraise for Fisk University, an HBCU in Nashville.

=== Initial "gospel" music era: late 19th century–1910s ===
An early reference to the term "gospel song" appeared in Philip Bliss' 1874 songbook, Gospel Songs. A Choice Collection of Hymns and Tunes, describing songs that were easy to grasp and more easily singable than the traditional church hymns, not unlike Watts' works from a century prior. This latter tradition was used in the context of the growing revival/camp meeting tradition, a form of worship familiar to Black Christians, who had often been forced to meet in large outdoor spaces due to racism and other concerns.

This increasingly interracial tradition would eventually morph into the larger Pentecostal movement, which began in a markedly interracial fashion in Los Angeles and helped Black gospel expand nationwide across racial boundaries. Sister Rosetta Tharpe would emerge from the Black Pentecostal tradition as the first notable gospel recording artist. Arizona Dranes, the first-recorded gospel pianist, came from similar roots during this period and helped introduce ragtime stylings to the genre. On the other hand, many Black Christians during this time (especially those in the North) had adopted a much milder form of Christian worship than their enslaved predecessors, reflecting more influence from Europe than from Africa.

=== Thomas Dorsey era: 1920s–1945 ===
Thomas Dorsey, a longtime secular artist, went gospel in the 1920s and revolutionized the genre by fusing it with his former style. With biblical knowledge from his father, who was a Baptist minister, and taught to play the piano by his mother, he called himself "Georgia Tom", and worked with blues musicians when the family moved to Atlanta. He went north to Chicago in 1916 and, after receiving his union card, became a notable artist in the area and also joined Pilgrim Baptist Church. He dropped secular music after a second conversion experience in 1921 at the National Baptist Convention, but quickly returned to the work for economic reasons, performing with artists like Ma Rainey.

While Pentecostalism grew on the West Coast and elsewhere, Black Christians in the South began to develop a quartet (and quartet-ish) style of a cappella gospel music, occasioning the rise of groups such as Julius Cheeks & Sensational Nightingales, the Swan Silvertones, The Soul Stirrers, the Dixie Hummingbirds, the Five Blind Boys of Mississippi, the Five Blind Boys of Alabama, the Fairfield Four, and the Golden Gate Quartet. Many other gospel musicians began to gain fame in this era as well, such as Blind Willie Johnson and Blind Joe Taggart. Such groups and artists, while popular in the Black community, largely escaped the notice of White America.

Thomas Dorsey left secular music behind for good after the sudden death of his wife and newborn son.

Dorsey attempted to share his gospel music with other but was initially shut down due to his secular background and the impact blues had on his gospel trajectoryHowever, the tide turned in . It has been said that 1930 was the year traditional black gospel music began, as the National Baptist Convention first publicly endorsed the music at its 1930 meeting.

Dorsey was responsible for developing the musical careers of many African-American artists, such as Mahalia Jackson. In 1942, the gospel group the Sensational Nightingales was founded, joined in 1946 by another gospel singer Julius Cheeks. Wilson Pickett and James Brown were influenced by Julius Cheeks.

=== 1946–1970s ===
Following World War II, gospel music moved into major auditoriums, and gospel music concerts became quite elaborate. In 1950, black gospel was featured at Carnegie Hall when Joe Bostic produced the Negro Gospel and Religious Music Festival. He repeated it the next year with an expanded list of performing artists, and in 1959 moved to Madison Square Garden.

In 1964, the Gospel Music Association was established, which in turn began the Dove Awards (in 1969) and the Gospel Music Hall of Fame (in 1972). Both of the latter two groups began primarily for Southern gospel performers, but in the late-1970s, began including artists of other sub-genres. Also in 1969, James Cleveland established the Gospel Music Workshop of America. Late 1970s, Mighty Clouds of Joy and the Canton Spirituals released gospel albums.

=== Contemporary era: 1980s–present ===
With the continuing rise in popularity of music as a form of radio, concert, and home entertainment, came the desire of some gospel artists to "cross over" into the secular genres and spaces that would afford them more exposure and success. This often came with a shift in musical style, taking on elements from secular music itself. This did not come without controversy, as many artists of this new urban contemporary gospel genre (like The Clark Sisters) would face criticism from churches, standard-bearers of the traditional genre, and the Black Christian sphere at large, as their new work was often seen as a compromise with "the world" and its sinfulness. Their album sales would speak for themselves, however.

This pattern would repeat itself in subsequent decades, with new artists like Yolanda Adams, the Clark Sisters, Fred Hammond, Marvin Sapp, and Kirk Franklin making increasingly more bold forays into the secular world with their musical stylings, facing criticism from many within their tradition. They gained commercial success in the R&B chart and the current sphere of Black gospel recording artists is almost exclusively of the urban contemporary bent.

== Musical elements ==
=== Vocals ===
Even though the way gospel music is sung varies greatly between different denominations within the Historically Black Church, there are trends that can apply in most cases. Gospel music is generally sung in four part harmony between soprano, alto, tenor, and bass. There is normally instrumental accompaniment, but acapella is also frequently used. This harmony can carried out both with large choirs or with small groups. In traditional forms, sometimes called the Congregational Song (usually with a 12 or 16 bar form), there is a call and response between the soloist and choir. The soloist is expected to improvise lyrics during the vamp and modulate to a higher key at the apex of the song. Choirs rarely sing harmony in root position and will flip the voicing. Contemporary forms often mix elements of Classical singing such as polyphony but maintain the call and response form. The most famous example is Richard Smallwood's Calvary. Singers interject sacred acclamatory phrases such as "hallelujah," and "yes, Lord," which serve both musical, theological, and social functions.

=== Instruments ===
Musical instruments in Gospel music carry specific musical functions and social though specific instruments used may vary depending on geographic location, denomination, and local tradition. The primary instruments are the B3 organ and the piano. However, gospel ensembles will also have an electric bass and a drum set. In large studio productions, there may also be a string orchestra or horn sections. While uncommon, some gospel ensembles will include a single saxophonist. Singers and participants may also use tambourines and other hand held percussion instruments.

==== Piano ====
While originally rejected by the Black community in favor of the guitar,, the piano serves as the primary rhythmic and harmonic anchor. In some ensembles, the melody is doubled on the piano to support the singers. Gospel piano voicings are chordal in their nature and are played in a heavily syncopated manner. Singers rely on the piano for tonality but it also embellishes with passing chords and fills in for a bass. In traditional styles, it is not normal to have independent melodic development from the piano. However, "breaks" and filling "riffs" are common when singers drop out for a few beats. Roberta Martin was the first person to introduce this practice.

==== B3 Organ ====
The B3 organ (or Hammond organ) with a Leslie speaker was invented as an alternative to the traditional pipe organ. Clarence Cobbs bought one of the earliest Hammond organs for his congregation, the First Church of Deliverance in Chicago. Unlike the other instruments, the B3 has both a theological/social function and a musical function. Black Gospel musicians in the 1950s decided to add this instrument to their band stands because, in their mind, the timbre resembled a human voice. Socially it is meant to imitate "other worldly utterances" and add musical both musical and spiritual intensity. Twinkie Clark, one of the most eminent gospel organ players, refers to the practice as "playing in tongues." During sermons, the organ player will "talk back" or accompany to the preacher.

==== Harmony ====
Gospel and Jazz share much of the same harmonic language. Most harmony in Gospel music makes use of chord extensions: usually up to an 11th. Like in Jazz, a common progression, especially at the end of songs is the ii7 - V7 - I. In traditional Gospel, the I - vi - ii7 - V7 is also common. Gospel harmonic language also "walks up" chord progressions. This is a practices that inverts chords so that there is smooth voice leading.

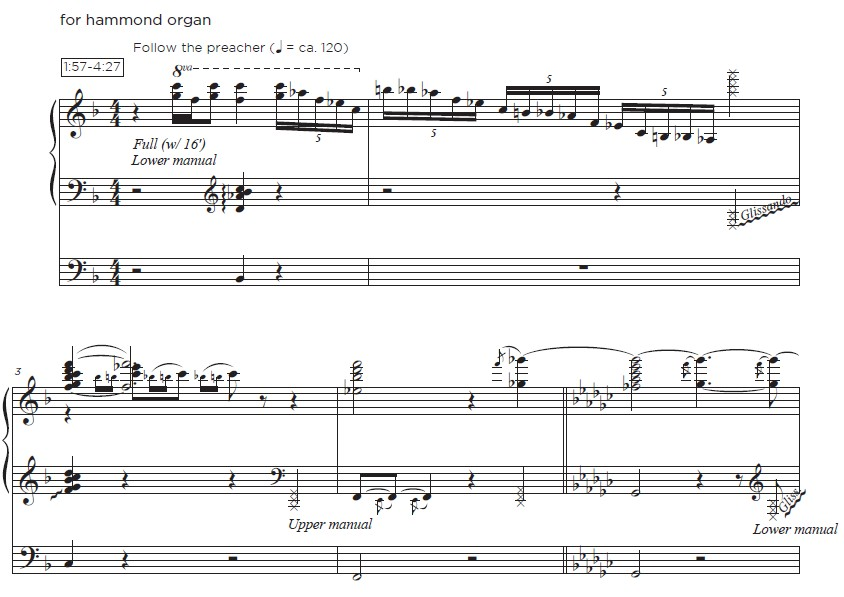
Transcription of Cory Henry "Following the Preacher" (talking back) from George Collier

== Subgenres ==
=== Traditional ===
Borne from the Negro Spirituals, Traditional Black gospel music is the most well-known form, often seen in Black churches, non-Black Pentecostal and evangelical churches, and in entertainment spaces across the country and world. It originates from the Southeastern United States ("the South"), where most Black Americans lived prior to the Great Migration. This music was highly influenced by the hymnody of the spirituals and of Watts and, later, the musical style and vision of Thomas Dorsey. Whereas northern Black churches did not at first welcomed Dorsey's music (having become accustomed to their own more Eurocentric flavorings), after the Southern migrants' new churches became more popular, so did gospel music, gospel choirs, and the general trend toward exclusive use of this music in Black churches. Thomas Dorsey, Mahalia Jackson, the Mississippi Mass Choir, the Colorado Mass Choir featuring Joe Pace, and the Georgia Mass Choir are but a few notable examples.

=== Urban contemporary ===
Developing out of the fusion of traditional Black gospel with the styles of secular Black music popular in the 1970s and 1980s, Urban Contemporary gospel is the most common form of recorded gospel music today. It relies heavily on rhythms and instrumentation common in the secular music of the contemporary era (often including the use of electronic beats), while still incorporating the themes and heritage of the traditional Black gospel genre. Notable singers of the genre include Kirk Franklin, Andrae Crouch and Donnie McClurkin.

=== British ===
British Black gospel refers to gospel music of the African diaspora in the UK. It is also often referred to as "UK gospel". The distinctive sound is heavily influenced by UK street culture with many artists from the African and Caribbean majority black churches in the UK. The genre has gained recognition in various awards such as the GEM (Gospel Entertainment Music) Awards, MOBO Awards, Urban Music Awards and has its own Official Christian & Gospel Albums Chart.

== See also ==
- Spirituals
- Black church
- African-American music
- Thomas A. Dorsey
- Kirk Franklin
