= Willmer Broadnax =

American musician

Willmer M. Broadnax
- Born: December 28, 1916; Houston, Texas, U.S.
- Died: June 1, 1992 (aged 75); Philadelphia, Pennsylvania, U.S.
- Occupation: Singer

Willmer M. "Little Axe" Broadnax (December 28, 1916 – June 1, 1992) was an American hard gospel quartet singer during the golden age of traditional black gospel. His most common nickname was "Little Axe", due to both his small stature and his brother William "Big Axe" Broadnax, who was a popular baritone.

== Early life ==
Broadnax was born in Houston, Texas in 1916, to William Broadnax and Gussie Frazier. By 1930 he lived with his step-father Augustus Flowers, mother Gussie Frazier, younger brother William Broadnax, and younger step-sister Armatha Broadnax in Houston. Broadnax was assigned female at birth, a fact which was only discovered upon his death and leads to confusion surrounding his early life.

Although Willmer was the oldest of the three Broadnax children, most sources state that Willmer was the younger of the two brothers. The fact that the identifiers "step-son" and "male" for Armatha are crossed out and corrected as "daughter" and "female" on the 1930 census may indicate that eight-year-old Armatha presented as male, and was initially perceived as such by the census taker. As Armatha Broadnax is unmentioned after the 1930 census, it is possible Armatha took on Willmer's name after his death and truly was William's younger sibling. This would mean that Willmer Broadnax as known today was born in 1922 in Louisiana to Augustus Flowers and Gussie Frazier. It is also possible that Willmer was in fact the older brother and had already started using male pronouns by age thirteen, and that later he was mistaken as the younger brother because of his high voice and short stature.

== Career ==
Broadnax began his career as a gospel singer during his teenage years with his brother William as a member of the St. Paul Gospel Singers in Houston in the 1930s. The two brothers moved to Los Angeles and joined Southern Gospel Singers; Willmer was a member from 1939 to 1940; the group only performed on weekends and did not tour.

The brothers eventually broke off to form their own quartet, Little Axe and the Golden Echoes. Although William eventually left for Atlanta, where he joined the Five Trumpets, Willmer stayed on as lead singer throughout the 1940s. In 1949 the group, augmented by future member of The Soul Stirrers Paul Foster, recorded a single of "When the Saints Go Marching In" for Specialty Records. Label chief Art Rupe decided to drop them before they could record a follow-up, and shortly thereafter the Golden Echoes disbanded.

Pianist Willie Love said during this period that, "Little Axe couldn’t sing low, because he had a relatively high voice. It wasn’t falsetto, it was naturally high. So somebody had to sing the bottom." His point is clear in the recordings of the Golden Echoes, where Paul Foster's rich baritone and Broadnax's clear tenor riff off each other to create the illusion of a multi-octave lead singer. As music critic Ray Funk points out, "Little Axe’s lead is absolutely distinctive on these cuts. He is the high lead that takes over from the baritone of Paul Foster. His voice is sweet but almost vicious, dripping with emotion, while Foster, in contrast, would offer almost a growl."

In 1950, Broadnax joined the Spirit of Memphis Quartet. Along with Broadnax, the group featured two other leads – Jethro "Jet" Bledsoe, a bluesy crooner, and Silas Steele, an overpowering baritone. The Spirit of Memphis Quartet recorded for King Records, and Broadnax appeared on their releases at least until 1952. Shortly after that, Broadnax moved on, working with The Fairfield Four, and in the early 1960s as one of the replacements for Archie Brownlee in the Five Blind Boys of Mississippi. Until 1965 Wilmer headed a quartet called "Little Axe and the Golden Echoes," which released some singles on Peacock Records. By then, quartet singing was fading in commercial viability, and Broadnax retired from touring.

In retirement, Broadnax continued to record new material occasionally with the Blind Boys into the 1970s and 1980s.

== Later years and death ==
Broadnax was killed in 1992 by his lover Lavina Richardson (who was age 42 at the time), who was later found guilty of involuntary manslaughter on February 4, 1993. Leading up to the stabbing, Broadnax had allegedly been jealous of Richardson. Broadnax saw Richardson in a vehicle with another man, bumped his car into theirs, and dragged Richardson out. He then threatened her with a knife before he was disarmed by a bystander, whereupon Richardson picked up his knife and stabbed him three times. Broadnax died from his injuries several days later on June 1, 1992.

Upon Broadnax's death in 1992, it was discovered that Broadnax was a trans man. This created a stir in the gospel community, with many prominent singers at the time insisting that they had suspected all along that his gender assigned at birth was female, including JoJo Wallace of the Sensational Nightingales who said, "I always wondered about Axe." However, it is more likely that only his brother William "Big Axe" Broadnax and other close family members knew about his gender identity.

The intersection of Broadnax's gender and race created some issues for him on tour as public bathrooms were segregated. It was not uncommon for many gospel singers to be unable to use public restrooms where they performed. Broadnax was forced to keep his gender identity a secret by using the restroom alone, which also provoked from retrospective suspicion by Claude Jeter who said, "Ax'd always go off by himself."

== Discography ==
=== Little Axe and the Golden Echoes ===
- The Lord Is My Sunshine / Remember Me, Peacock Records, 1963
- My Mind On Jesus / Jesus Loves Me, Peacock Records, 1963
- My Life Is In His Hands / So Soon, Peacock Records, 1964
- Lord Have Mercy / Swing Down Chariot, Peacock Records, 1965
- Old Time Religion, Specialty Records / Ace Records (United States), 1992
- American Pop / Gospel's Golden Age, Volume 3 (1945 - 1959), Collector Records, 2012

=== The Spirit of Memphis Quartet ===
- Make More Room For Jesus / Calvary, King Records, 1950
- How Far Am I From Canaan / I'll Never Forget, King Records, 1950
- On The Battlefield / Jesus, Jesus, King Records, 1950
- Days Past And Gone/Blessed Are The Dead, King Records, 1950
- Tell Heaven I'm Coming / Ten Commandments, King Records, 1951
- Sign Of The Judgement / Every Time I Feel The Spirit, King Records, 1951
- The World Prayer / Every Day And Every Hour, King Records, 1951
- Lord Jesus Part 1 / Lord Jesus Part 2, King Records, 1952

=== The Fairfield Four ===
- Come Over Here/Who Is That Knocking, Dot Records, 1953
- His Eye Is on the Sparrow/Every Day, Dot Records, 1953
- How I Got Over/This Evening Our Father, Dot Records, 1953
- Stand by Me/Hear Me When I Pray, Dot Records, 1953
- When The Battle Is Over/Standing on the Rock, Dot Records, 1953
- Somebody Touched Me/Mother Don't Worry, Dot Records, 1953

=== The Five Blind Boys of Mississippi ===
- Precious Memories, Peacock Records, 1960
- I Call On Jesus / Time To Think About The Lord, Peacock Records, 1960
- I Never Heard A Man, Peacock Records, 1960
- Sending Up My Timber, Peacock Records, 1961
- Can't Serve The Lord / Constantly Abiding, Peacock Records, 1961
- Five Blind Boys* / Spirit Of Memphis - Negro Spirituals, Peacock Records, 1961
- Father I Stretched My Hands To Thee / Lord Remember Me, Peacock Records, 1962
- I Got It Within Me / The Tide Of Life, Peacock Records, 1962
- You Done What The Doctor Couldn't Do / Speak For Jesus, Peacock Records, 1963
- Just A Little While / Servant's Prayer, Peacock Records, 1963
- Something To Shout About / Leaning On Jesus, Peacock Records, 1964
- Father I Stretch My Hand to Thee, Peacock Records, 1964
- Lift The Savior Up / In The Hands Of The Lord, Peacock Records, 1965
- My Soul Is A Witness / Love Lifted Me, Peacock Records, 1970
- Oh Well, What Can You Do / I Have But One Desire, Peacock Records, 1974

=== Compilations ===
- So Many Years, Jubilee Records, 1989
