= Grace Morris Allen Jones =

American educator, reformer, and writer (1876–1928)

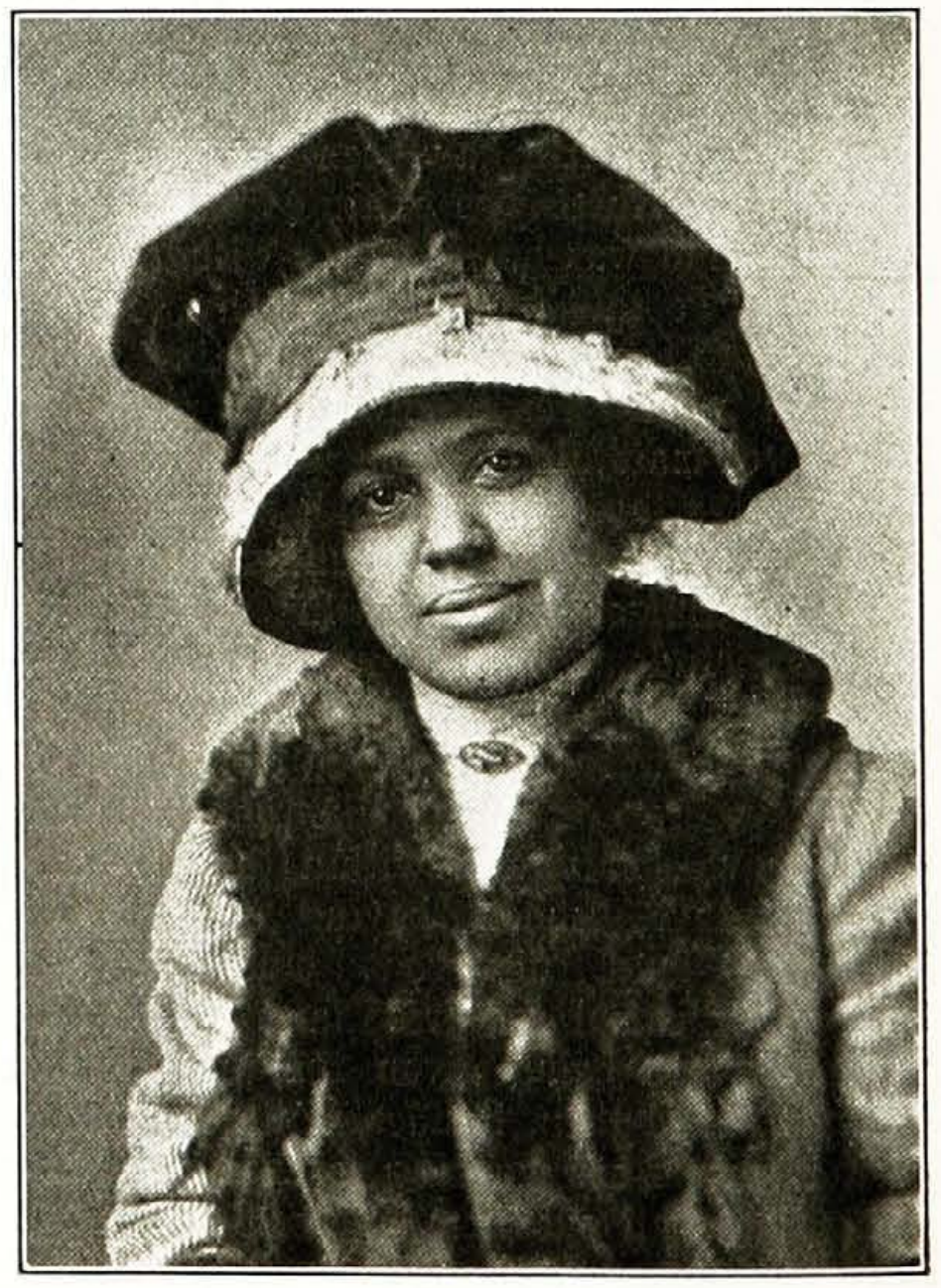
- Born: 7 January 1876; Keokuk, Iowa
- Died: 2 March 1928 (aged 52); Piney Woods, Mississippi
- Resting place: Piney Woods
- Education: Burlington High School, University of Iowa, Chicago Conservatory of Music
- Occupations: Educator, school founder, fundraiser, postmaster, clubwoman, reformer, and writer
- Employer: Piney Woods Country Life School
- Organization: Mississippi State Federation of Colored Women’s Clubs
- Spouse: Laurence C. Jones
- Children: Laurence Jr., Turner, and Helen

Grace Morris Allen Jones (7 January 1876 – 2 March 1928) was an African American educator, school founder, fundraiser, postmaster, clubwoman, reformer, and writer. As well as founding her own vocational training school in Burlington, Iowa, she was instrumental in the success of Piney Woods Country Life School, which she ran with her husband, Laurence C. Jones, in Mississippi.

== Early life ==
Grace Morris Allen Jones was born in Keokuk, Iowa on 7 January 1876 to James Addison Morris and Mary Ellen Morris, née Pyles. The family was educated and well-off. Grace's grandmother was abolitionist Charlotta Gordon Pyles, and Grace would later write an article about this side of her family for The Palimpsest, entitled 'The Desire for Freedom.' The piece told the story of Charlotta Pyles’ escape from slavery, and her successful efforts to free other enslaved people. Grace's mother, Mary Ellen, was Charlotta’s youngest daughter.

In 1891, Grace became the first African American to graduate from Burlington High School, and is believed to have subsequently graduated from the University of Iowa. For her active work in the area's Sunday schools, she was known as 'the Sunday school girl of Iowa'. She also established the first integrated kindergarten in Burlington.

After earning her teacher's certificate from the Normal School in Burlington, Grace taught for three years in Missouri, at schools in Bethel and Slater. In 1902, she returned to Burlington, and established the Grace M. Allen Industrial School 'for colored youth'. The school employed both black and white staff, and although intended for African American students, its success and reputation led white students to attend. After the school's closure in 1906, she studied public speaking at the Chicago Conservatory of Music, going on to work as a fundraiser, public speaker, and financial agent for education, including for the Ambidexter Institute of Springfield, Illinois, and Eckstein-Norton Normal and Industrial Institute of Cane Springs, Kentucky.

== Marriage and Piney Woods ==
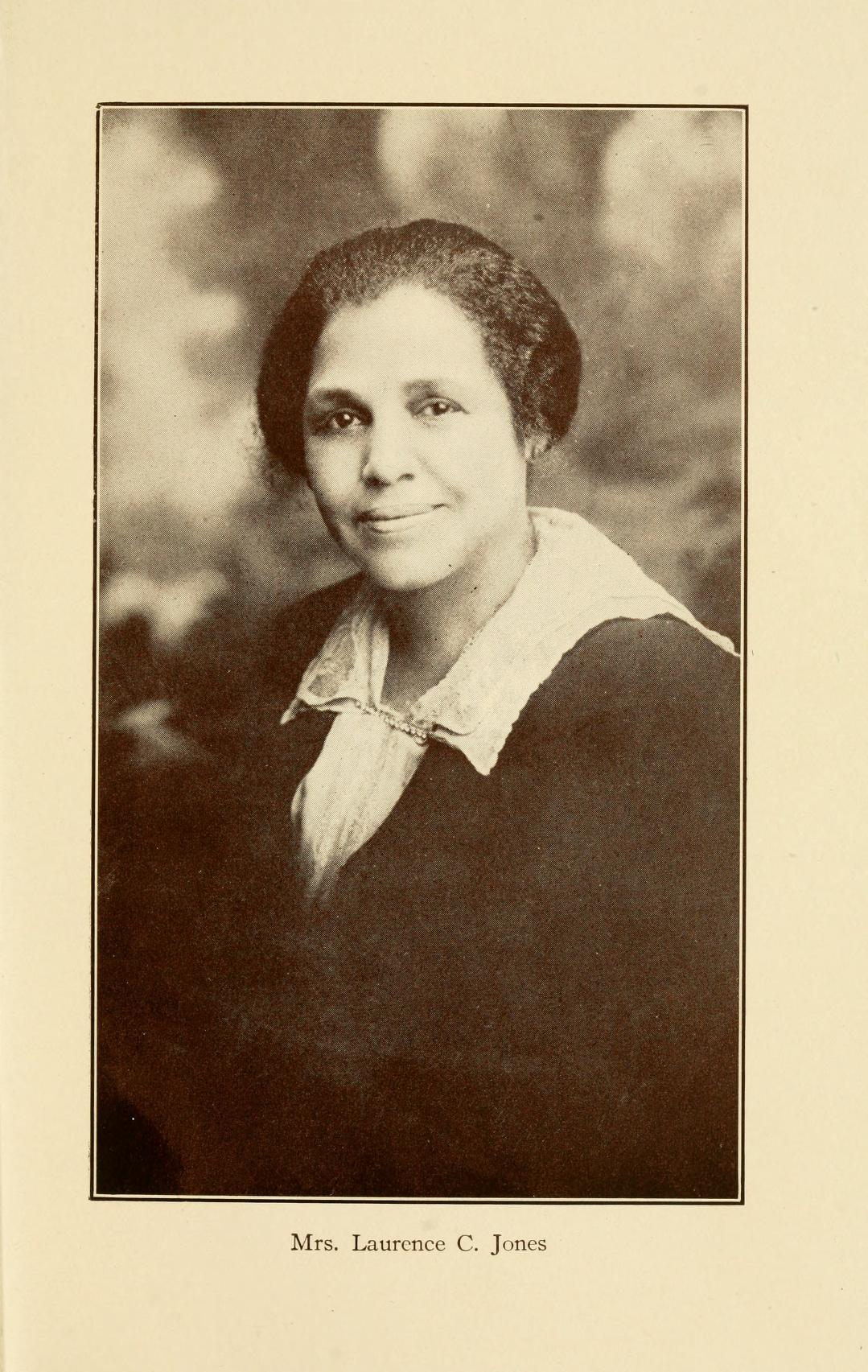
Grace Morris Allen Jones in Piney Woods and Its Story by Laurence C. Jones, 1922

Grace married Laurence C. Jones in Iowa City in 1912, becoming an Executive Secretary and teacher of English at Piney Woods Country Life School. The two had met years earlier when Laurence Jones delivered a speech in an Iowan church, and later reconnected when he returned to the state. Jones recalled his first impression of Grace in Piney Woods and Its Story (1922), writing that he 'thought her the brightest and most enthusiastic little woman of my race that I had ever met. I saw in her my ideal and felt sure that we should meet again some day—and we did. The Crisis described her as having 'proved her fitness to share in his ambitions by a number of years' service in successful teaching' and Jones himself noted in 1922 that it was:

...largely by reason of her energy and skill, her devotion and enthusiasm, that we have been able to accomplish more within the last few years than in any previous years in the history of the school.

A description of the school in The Crisis outlined:

...eight teachers, who teach academic work in the morning and industrial training in the afternoon. Cooking, sewing, housekeeping, gardening, agriculture, carpentry, shoe mending, broom making, printing and laundrying are the industries. We have 169 acres of land, three large buildings, seven smaller ones used for shops, barns, poultry house, live stock and industrial apparatus.

Much loved by the community, Jones became known as 'The Sunshine Lady of the Piney Woods'. The couple began married life in a one-room log cabin at Piney Woods, before moving into 'the corner room of a school building, another room in an academic building, an old mill house, and finally a comfortable cottage in 1922'. This final cottage they named the Community House, because of its regular use as the location for meetings and gatherings. They had two biological children, Laurence Jr. and Turner Harris, and adopted a daughter, Helen Elizabeth, who went on to be a successful jazz musician.

Building on her earlier fundraising experience, and dismayed by the situation of students without money for tuition, Jones sought to raise money for Piney Woods through lecture tours throughout the US. In the North, the Joneses were frequently refused service in restaurants and denied the use of restrooms. As part of her efforts, Grace Jones started the Cotton Blossom Singers, who toured the country raising money for Piney Woods. Jones believed that the Cotton Blossoms would be valuable not only for fundraising, but for building on the pupils' innate talents and enabling them to see the country. Performances by the group were followed by telling the Piney Woods story, after which donations were collected. Funds raised helped to build better accommodations for students at the school, and to purchase school supplies, food, and clothing for those without. One eighteen-month tour in 1927, led by Grace Jones, travelled from California to New England, and generated thousands of dollars. The Cotton Blossom Singers continued to tour long after Jones' death in 1928.

=== Civic work ===
At Piney Woods, Grace worked not only as a teacher, administrator, and fundraiser, but also as an organizer of clubs for women. She established and ran Mothers’ Clubs, which promoted high standards in child rearing, cooking, and crafts. She made connections between these and the Mississippi State Federation of Colored Women’s Clubs, of which she was President from 1918 to 1923. In this role, she was instrumental in raising funds for repairing the Old Folks Home in Vicksburg, Mississippi, and acted as one of its trustees. She was also a President of the Women's Christian Union, and, in 1925, served as a statistician for the National Association of Colored Women’s Clubs.

Jones worked actively to improve the lives of women and children of color, using the women's clubs to promote education, provide resources, and improve child care. She was also active in efforts for prison reform in Mississippi, and was instrumental in the building of a reform school to prevent black youth being incarcerated in adult facilities with hardened criminals. This was the Margaret Murray Washington Home for Delinquent Youths.

Grace Jones also worked, with success, for the Mississippi Board of Education to include African American history in the teaching of state and national history. She was also instrumental in achieving State provision of libraries for African American public schools, and in establishing a school for blind black students.

== Death and legacy ==
Grace Morris Allen Jones died from the after-effects of pneumonia in 1928. An obituary in The Annals of Iowa wrote that she 'exerted an unusual influence for good during her very active career', and Laurence C. Jones that 'to record... [her worth] would make a book in itself and then it would only be half-told, for it is too great to be fashioned into words. Only the lives of those she has helped express it.'
