= Alfred Liggins =

American businessman

Alfred C. Liggins, III
- Born: January 30, 1965 (age 61); Omaha, Nebraska, U.S.
- Education: University of California, Los Angeles; University of the District of Columbia; University of Pennsylvania (MBA)
- Parent: Cathy Hughes (mother)

Alfred C. Liggins, III (born January 30, 1965) is an American businessman and business executive. He is the current president & CEO of Urban One, a media conglomerate founded by his mother, Cathy Hughes, and which is the largest African-American-owned broadcasting company in the United States, currently operating over 50 radio stations.

== Biography ==
=== Early life & career ===
Liggins was born on January 30, 1965, in Omaha, Nebraska, to Alfred Liggins Jr. and Cathy Hughes. Through his mother, his grandparents were Helen Jones Woods, a trombonist with the International Sweethearts of Rhythm at Piney Woods School, a private boarding school in Mississippi, and William Alfred Woods, who was the first African-American to earn an accounting degree from Creighton University. His great-grandfather, Laurence C. Jones, was a successful Mississippi educator and lynching survivor.

After living in Omaha in his infancy, they moved to Washington D.C. when he was seven, as his mother took up a job with Howard University. His first radio job was as a sportscaster and as a teen talk show host on his mother and stepfather's station WOL. He graduated from Woodrow Wilson High School in 1983. He moved to California to join his stepfather, Dewey Hughes, and worked as a Sales Executive at Light Records while attending night classes at UCLA. He would quit the job to take up a job offer with Motown Records, but the job offer fell through.

=== Urban One ===
At his mother's suggestion, he would move back to the DC area to help his mother with running WOL, joining as an account manager. At one point, they lived in the radio station due to Hughes having incurred debt in running the station. While working at WOL, he attended night classes at the University of the District of Columbia (UDC), though he did not graduate. On account of his work with Radio One and a recommendation from The Reverend Jesse Jackson, he would attend and later graduate with a Masters in Business Administration (MBA) from the Wharton School of the University of Pennsylvania in 1995.

He rose through the ranks at WOL and helped grow the company into a regional player in radio, growing further by his suggestion to buy FM stations in the DC area. These stations would often be converted to appeal to an African-American audience, an underserved demographic in the radio market. The radio stations became a staple of Black media in the DC region, and this would be the precursor to Urban One. In 1997, he became president and CEO of Urban One, while his mother remained the owner and chairwoman of the board of the company. The company went public in 1999, the first company owned and chaired by an African-American woman to do so.

Their portfolio expanded as they purchased 21 channels from Clear Channel, and was further expanded with the launch of TV One in 2004, with the partnership of Comcast. This made Urban One the largest radio company in urban markets in the United States. This would be followed up by the launch of Cleo TV, launched mainly for Millennial and Generation X African-American women, as well as Interactive One (now iOne Digital). As of 2020, the company owns 56 radio stations in 16 different markets, with TV One reaching 59 million households. Under his run as CEO, they have also expanded into the casino industry.

In 2015, Liggins was inducted into the Broadcasting and Cable Hall of Fame. In 2021, he became a member of the Board of Directors of Broadcast Music, Inc. In addition, he has also sat on the board of, among other organizations, the Apollo Theater Foundation, Reach Media, Boys & Girls Clubs of America, iBiquity, the National Association of Black Owned Broadcasters, and the National Association of Broadcasters.
