= Traditional black gospel =

African American Christian music genre

Traditional Black gospel
- Stylistic origins: Spirituals; blues; Christian hymns
- Cultural origins: Late 19th century, African Americans
- Typical instruments: Early: Vocals; Contemporary: Vocals; piano; guitar; bass; drums; Hammond organ
- Derivative forms: Rhythm and blues; soul

Other topics
- Gospel music; jubilee quartets; mass choirs

Traditional black gospel is music that is written to express either personal or a communal belief regarding African American Christian life, as well as (in terms of the varying music styles) to give a Christian alternative to mainstream secular music. It is a form of Christian music and a subgenre of black gospel music.

Like other forms of music, the creation, performance, significance, and even the definition of gospel music varies according to culture and social context. It is composed and performed for many purposes, ranging from aesthetic pleasure, religious or ceremonial purposes, or as an entertainment product for the marketplace. However, a common theme as with most Christian music is praise, worship or thanks to God and Christ.

Traditional gospel music was popular in the mid-20th century. It is the primary source for urban contemporary gospel and Christian hip hop, which rose in popularity during the late 20th century and early 21st century.

== Origins and development ==
The origins of gospel music are during American slavery, when enslaved Africans were introduced to the Christian religion and converted in large numbers. Remnants of different African cultures were combined with Western Christianity, with one result being the emergence of the spiritual. Jubilee songs and sorrow songs were two type of spirituals that emerged during the 18th and 19th centuries.

Some spirituals were also used to pass on hidden messages; for example, when Harriet Tubman was nearby, slaves would sing "Go Down, Moses" to signify that a 'deliverer' was nearby. At this time, the term "gospel songs" referred to evangelical hymns sung by Protestant (Congregational and Methodist) Christians, especially those with a missionary theme. Gospel composers included writers like Ira D. Sankey and Mason Lowry, and Charles B. Tindell. Hymns, Protestant gospel songs, and spirituals make up the basic source of modern Black gospel.

- The Library of Congress has recordings of Negro Spirituals

1. Song - Go down Moses

2. Song - Deep river

3. Song - Golden slippers

4. Song - Steal away

- The Library of Congress has recordings of African Americans singing Black Gospel

1. Song - Oh Jonah

2. Song - We Are Americans, Praise the Lord

3. Song - Lead Me to That Rock

4. Song - Death Come a-Knockin

=== Original music (1920s–1940s) ===
What most African Americans would identify today as "gospel" began in the early 20th century. The gospel music that Thomas A. Dorsey, Sallie Martin, Willie Mae Ford Smith and other pioneers popularized had its roots in the blues as well as in the more freewheeling forms of religious devotion of "Sanctified" or "Holiness" churches—sometimes called "holy rollers" by other denominations — who encouraged individual church members to "testify", speaking or singing spontaneously about their faith and experience of the Holy Ghost and "Getting Happy", sometimes while dancing in celebration. In the 1920s Sanctified artists, such as Arizona Dranes, many of whom were also traveling preachers, started making records in a style that melded traditional religious themes with barrelhouse, blues and boogie-woogie techniques and brought jazz instruments, such as drums and horns, into the church.

Thomas Dorsey stretched the boundaries in his day to create great gospel music, choirs, and quartets. Talented vocalists have been singing these songs far beyond Dorsey's expectations.

Dorsey, who had once composed for and played piano behind blues giants Tampa Red, Ma Rainey and Bessie Smith, worked hard to develop this new music, organizing an annual convention for gospel artists, touring with Martin to sell sheet music and gradually overcoming the resistance of more conservative churches to what many of them considered sinful, worldly music. Combining the sixteen bar structure and blues modes and rhythms with religious lyrics, Dorsey's compositions opened up possibilities for innovative singers such as Sister Rosetta Tharpe to apply their very individual talents to his songs, while inspiring church members to "shout" — either to call out catch phrases or to add musical lines of their own in response to the singers.

This looser style affected other Black religious musical styles as well. The most popular groups in the 1930s were male quartets or small groups such as The Golden Gate Quartet, who sang, usually unaccompanied, in jubilee style, mixing careful harmonies, melodious singing, playful syncopation and sophisticated arrangements to produce a fresh, experimental style far removed from the more somber hymn-singing. These groups also absorbed popular sounds from pop groups such as The Mills Brothers and produced songs that mixed conventional religious themes, humor and social and political commentary. They began to show more and more influence from gospel as they incorporated the new music into their repertoire.

In the 1930s gospel music of the civil rights movement was referred to as the Black gospel period because this was the most prosperous era for gospel music. The message of many of the civil rights activists was supported by the message gospel music was putting forth.

=== Golden age (1940s–1950s) ===
The new gospel music composed by Dorsey and others proved very important among quartets, who began turning in a new direction. Groups such as the Dixie Hummingbirds, Pilgrim Travelers, Soul Stirrers, Swan Silvertones, Sensational Nightingales and Five Blind Boys of Mississippi introduced even more stylistic freedom to the close harmonies of jubilee style, adding ad libs and using repeated short phrases in the background to maintain a rhythmic base for the innovations of the lead singers. Melodically, gospel songs from this era were more diatonic and conjunct. As "the spirit leads the vocalist" the melodies would become more chromatic and disjunct, evoking pure spiritual emotion that was congruent with the accompanying body or musicians.

Individual singers also stood out more as jubilee turned to "hard gospel" and as soloists began to shout more and more, often in falsettos anchored by a prominent bass. Quartet singers combined both individual virtuoso performances and innovative harmonic and rhythmic invention—what Ira Tucker Sr. and Paul Owens of the Hummingbirds called "trickeration"—that amplified both the emotional and musical intensity of their songs.

By the 1940s, gospel music had expanded to members of all denominations prompting Black gospel artists to begin tours and becoming full-time musicians. In this venture Sister Rosetta Tharpe became a pioneer, initially selling millions of records with her ability to drive audiences into hysteria by sliding and bending her pitch as well as accompanying herself on steel guitar. In contrast, Mahalia Jackson used her dusky contralto voice to develop her gospel ballads as well as favouring a more joyful approach to singing the gospel. W. Herbert Brewster wrote "Move on Up a Little Higher" Jackson's first hit.

At the same time that quartet groups were reaching their zenith in the 1940s and 1950s, a number of women singers were achieving stardom. Some, such as Mahalia Jackson and Bessie Griffin, were primarily soloists, while others, such as Clara Ward, Albertina Walker, The Caravans, The Davis Sisters and Dorothy Love Coates, sang in small groups. While some groups, such as The Ward Singers, employed the sort of theatrics and daring group dynamics that male quartet groups used, for the most part women gospel singers relied instead on overpowering technique and dramatic personal witness to establish themselves.

Roberta Martin in Chicago stood apart from other women gospel singers in many respects. She led groups that featured both men and women singers, employed an understated style that did not stress individual virtuosity, and sponsored a number of individual artists, such as James Cleveland, who went on to change the face of gospel in the decades that followed.

=== The 1960s–1980s ===
Gospel started to break way from the traditional church setting, choirs, and just singing hymns. There were more solo artists that emerged during these decades, and during this period marked the end of the heyday of traditional gospel, making way for contemporary gospel.

== Influence ==
Gospel artists, who had been influenced by pop music trends for years, had a major influence on early rhythm and blues artists, particularly the "bird groups" such as the Orioles, the Ravens and the Flamingos, who applied gospel quartets' a cappella techniques to pop songs in the late 1940s and throughout the 1950s. These groups based their music on sounds they had been singing in church and were now releasing gospel-styled reworking of songs for a secular audience. The influence of gospel was apparent in new versions of pop standards or new songs in a pop style. Elvis Presley, Jerry Lee Lewis and Little Richard were rock 'n' roll pioneers with a religious background. Like other artists, these pioneers were stylistically influenced by gospel and it contributed to their music. Elvis was successful in performing his gospel favorites, "Why me Lord", How Great Thou Art, and "You'll never walk alone". For all of his success as a rock 'n' roll singer, he only received awards for his gospel recordings.

Individual gospel artists, such as Sam Cooke, a former member of the Soul Stirrers, and secular artists who borrowed heavily from gospel, such as Ray Charles, James Brown, James Booker and Jackie Wilson, had an even greater impact later in the 1950s, helping to create soul music by bringing even more gospel inspired harmonies and traditions from rhythm and blues. Many of the most prominent soul artists, such as Aretha Franklin, Wilson Pickett, Otis Redding, James Carr, Otis Clay, David Ruffin, James Brown, Joe Tex and Al Green, had roots in the church and gospel music and brought with them much of the vocal styles of hard shouter such as Julius Cheeks. The underlying virtues of soul/R&B music taken from gospel, is the direct emotional delivery, truth to a spirit and the feeling within a song transmitted to the listener. During the 1970s, artists like Edwin Hawkins with the 1969 hit "Oh Happy Day", and Andraé Crouch's hit "Take me Back" were big inspirations on gospel music and crossover successes. Both Hawkins and Crouch incorporated secular music styles into gospel, shaping modern contemporary Christian music today.

Secular songwriters often appropriated gospel songs, such as the Pilgrim Travelers' song "I've Got A New Home", or the Doc Pomus song Ray Charles turned into a hit "Lonely Avenue", or "Stand By Me", which Ben E. King and Leiber and Stoller adapted from a well-known gospel song, or Marvin Gaye's "Can I Get a Witness", which reworks traditional gospel catchphrases. In other cases secular musicians did the opposite, attaching phrases and titles from the gospel tradition to secular songs to create soul hits such as "Come See About Me" for The Supremes and "99½ Won't Do" for Wilson Pickett.

When roots music (which including spirituals) became popular in the 1960s and 1970s, a combination of the powerful rhythm and timbres found in spirituals and "hard gospel" combined with the instrumentation and lyrical content of R&B and country contributed to various forms of rock music.

== See also ==
- List of gospel musicians

General:

- Black church
- Soul music
- R&B
- rock 'n' roll

== Relevant literature ==
- Marovich, Robert. 2015. A City Called Heaven: Chicago and the Birth of Gospel Music. Champaign, Illinois: University of Illinois Press.
- McNeil, W.K. 2010. Encyclopedia of American Gospel Music. New York: Routledge.
- Zolten, Jerry. 2003. Great God A'Mighty! The Dixie Hummingbirds: Celebrating the Rise of Soul Gospel Music. New York City, New York: Oxford University Press.
