= Joe Ligon (singer) =

American gospel signer (1936–2016)

- Ligon in concert

Background information
- Born: Willie Joe Ligon; October 11, 1936; Troy, Alabama, US
- Origin: Los Angeles, California, US
- Died: December 11, 2016 (aged 80) Atlanta, Georgia, US
- Genre: Traditional gospel
- Occupation: Member of Mighty Clouds of Joy
- Years active: 1955–2012

Willie Joe Ligon (October 11, 1936 – December 11, 2016), known professionally as Joe Ligon, was an American gospel singer. He was the lead singer for the Mighty Clouds of Joy.

== Biography and career ==
Willie Joe Ligon was born in Troy, Alabama on October 11, 1936. His father was a gospel quartet singer, and his grandfather was a preacher. He started singing when he was just a boy, performing with his cousins in Troy. At the age of 14, he visited an uncle in Los Angeles and decided to stay. He enrolled at Thomas Jefferson High School, and in 1955, he started the group Mighty Clouds of Joy. Ligon recalled in 1985 that he was inspired to form the group after seeing Rev. Julius Cheeks, of the Sensational Nightingales, perform at a concert in Los Angeles. In the 1960s, Ligon turned down an offer from Sam Cooke to help him establish a career as a pop music singer, with Cooke writing and producing songs for him.

Some of the highlights of his career include performing with B. B. King, Ray Charles, appearing on The Mike Douglas Show, and Ligon along with his group, were the first gospel act to appear on Soul Train. He appeared on television specials with Gladys Knight, Natalie Cole, Flip Wilson and Lou Rawls. Ligon and his band also opened for Al Green, the Rolling Stones, Aretha Franklin, Marvin Gaye, Earth, Wind and Fire and Paul Simon. Ligon and his group earned three Grammy awards for best traditional soul gospel performance during his career.

== Personal life ==
Ligon married Peggy Reece in 1968. In 2016, he died at the age of 80. He was buried in Beaumont, Texas, where his wife was originally from.

== Discography ==
- "Time"
- "Mighty High"
- "Walk Around Heaven" by James Cleveland and Cassetta George
- "Everybody Ought To Praise His Name"
- "Heavy Load"

== See also ==
- Gospel Music Hall of Fame
- List of gospel musicians
- Soul music
