= Martha Louise Morrow Foxx =

- Martha Louise Morrow Foxx, from a 1969 newspaper.
- Born: October 9, 1902; Charlotte, North Carolina
- Died: 1985 (aged 82–83)
- Occupation: Educator

Martha Louise Morrow Foxx (October 9, 1902 – 1985) was an American educator who worked at the Piney Woods Country Life School campus of the Mississippi Blind School for Negroes for forty years, from 1929 to 1969.

== Early life ==
Martha Louise Morrow was born in Charlotte, North Carolina, the daughter of Frank Morrow and Hattie Morrow. Foxx became partially blind in infancy, from an eye disease. She entered the Governor Morehead School for the blind as a young child, until her family moved to Philadelphia, Pennsylvania when Foxx was eleven. There she was enrolled in the Overbrook School for the Blind, later beginning college at Temple University.

After her first year she moved to Piney Woods, Mississippi to begin her career. In the summers after starting there she attended West Virginia State College, University of Wisconsin–Madison and the Hampton Institute, where she completed her bachelor's degree.

== Career ==
=== Piney Woods Country Life School ===
Foxx was instrumental in founding the Mississippi Blind School for Negroes on the Piney Woods School campus in April 1929. Initially called the "house mistress," she later held the title of principal.

In 1945, Helen Keller visited the Piney Woods School and appeared before the state legislature to appeal for funding. In 1950, the new Mississippi School for the Blind for African American students was completed and moved to its new location on Capers Street in Jackson, Mississippi where Foxx was the principal.

Laurence C. Jones, who founded the Piney Woods School in 1909, said of Foxx, "She ministered, not only to their intellectual needs, but to their moral and spiritual needs as well." Jones described Foxx's relationship to her charges as like that of a mother. She taught students domestic skills, how to make mats and cane seating, and music. "She developed in all her students’ self-reliance so that they could eagerly look forward to the time when they could support themselves out in the world," Jones said. As early as 1920 music groups performed across the South and Eastern U.S. on tours to gain support for the school.

Jones asked Foxx to help organize a blind quartet known as the Cotton Blossom Singers, who recorded for Alan Lomax in 1937, and after their graduation became famous as the nucleus of the Five Blind Boys of Mississippi.

Foxx retired from her job as principal in 1969, saying "I've enjoyed everything connected with teaching. It has been my whole life".

=== Teaching methodology ===
Foxx's teaching philosophy embraced a very modern dynamic of learning outside the walls of the classroom and of incorporating nature into lessons. She often took the children into the surrounding woods to hunt for plums and to pick wild berries. Ernestine Archie, a graduate of the school's first class of 1934, recalled Foxx's determination that the visually-impaired students be allowed to enjoy outings just as the sighted students did and that their senses of touch, taste, sound and smell made up for the deficiency in sight. Archie recalled how the dynamic teacher also claimed that these forays into nature sharpened the blind students’ "sixth sense," honing their spirits as well as their minds. Utilizing what at the time were progressive techniques, Foxx taught her students to read Braille and special large-print books.

=== Honors and awards ===
Foxx received the 1942 Franklin Delano Roosevelt (FDR) Drama Award, which came with a cash grant to fund fine arts instruction. In 1969, she was named Outstanding Teacher of the Year by the Mississippi Teachers Association. In 2013, she was inducted into the America Printing House for the Blind's Hall of Fame. In Rankin County, Mississippi, there is a historic marker about Foxx, placed in 2009 near the site of Piney Woods School.

== Personal life ==
Martha Louise Morrow married Alexander Foxx in 1937. She died in 1985, in her eighties.
