= Jeff Banks (musician) =

- Also known as: Bishop Jeff Banks
- Born: Jeff Willie Banks; June 7, 1927; Pittsburgh, Pennsylvania
- Died: January 31, 1997 (aged 69) Newark, New Jersey
- Genres: gospel, traditional black gospel
- Occupations: Singer, songwriter
- Instruments: vocals, singer-songwriter
- Years active: 1953–1997
- Label: Savoy

Bishop Jeff Willie Banks (June 7, 1927 – January 31, 1997), was an American gospel musician and founding pastor of Revival Temple Holiness that was affiliated with The Church of God in Christ. He started his music career, in 1953, with the Famous Banks Brothers, after they were under the tutelage of Mary Johnson Davis from 1947 until 1953. He released his first album, Lord Lift Me Up, that was released by Savoy Records in 1984, which all of his album were released by the label. He would release seven albums, and four of those charted on the Billboard magazine Gospel Albums chart, Lord Lift Me Up in 1984, 1987's Caught up in the Rapture, 1989's The Storm Is Over, He's All over Me in 1993.

== Early life ==
Banks was born on June 7, 1927, in Pittsburgh, Pennsylvania, as Jeff Willie Banks. His brother, Charles O. Davis, was born two years later, which both of them were mentored in music as soloist by Mary Johnson Davis from 1947 until 1953. They departed to for the Famous Banks Brothers, and relocated to Newark, New Jersey, where they were both compelled to become ministers by God and start and lead their own churches. Rev Charles Banks started Greater Harvest Baptist Church and Jeff Banks was The Minister of Music In 1965 Jeff started, Revival Temple Holiness Church was affiliated with The Church of God in Christ.

== Music career ==
Avery White and Bishop Jeff Banks Organized Revival Temple Mass Choir 1976. First Live album 1977 on Savoy Records " Master Mind Is He. Produced By John Daniels And Fred Mendelsohn Also hit the Billboard Charts. Jeff Banks Choir Travel The Country . 2nd Album The Righteous with the Hit Song " Go Ahead " 3rd Album Taking him higher " Don't Give Up Stay in the Race.1982 4th Album "WORK ON ME" Taking The Choir Higher On Billboard. Jeff Banks Always reach out for Writers Like: Paul Gainer, Dennis Bines, Steven Roberts, Rev Lawrence Roberts, Archie Mitchell, Michael Gittens, John P. Kee, Jeffery La Valley, Johnny Shipley, James Perry, Florence Anderson, Milton Biggham, S .Wills-H-Williams and the list go on. In 1984, with the release of Love Lift Me UpAlbum Pray Will Fix It Hit The Billboard Charts for Weeks. This album along with three other placed on the Billboard magazine Gospel Albums chart at No. 3,. 6th Live Album "Touch me one more time" Songs Like Let Me Walk in the Spirit and Saved So Glad About It . In 1987's Caught up in the Rapture at No. 12, Let's go back to the old landmark Swept the Country. The Storm Is Over at No. 18, Live Video Recorded of The Best of Bishop Jeff Banks & Revival Temple Mass Choir. 1993's He's All over Me at No. 9. He has performed his music at Madison Square Garden and Carnegie Hall. Apollo Theatre, Beacon Theatre with Al Green, Smithsonian Institution in Washington, DC. Also a Live album with the Famous Banks Brothers &Revival Temple Mass Choir " Lord I've Tired.

== Personal life ==
Bishop Banks died suddenly on January 31, 1997, in Newark, New Jersey.
