= Cathy Hughes =

American radio entrepreneur and personality

- Born: Catherine Elizabeth Woods; April 22, 1947 (age 79); Omaha, Nebraska, U.S.
- Education: University of Nebraska Omaha; Creighton University
- Occupations: Entrepreneur, radio and television personality
- Organization: Radio One
- Spouses: Alfred Liggins Jr. (m. 1965; div. 1967) Dewey Hughes (m. 1979; div. 1987)
- Children: Alfred C. Liggins, III
- Parent: Helen Jones Woods (mother)

Catherine Liggins Hughes (born Catherine Elizabeth Woods; April 22, 1947) is an American entrepreneur, radio and television personality and business executive. She has been listed as the second-richest Black woman in the United States, after Oprah Winfrey. She founded the media company Radio One (Urban One), and when the company went public in 1999, she became the first African-American woman to head a publicly traded corporation. In the 1970s, Hughes created the urban radio format called "The Quiet Storm" on Howard University's radio station WHUR with disc jockey and fellow Howard student Melvin Lindsey.

== Early life ==
Cathy Hughes was born to Helen Jones Woods, a trombonist with the International Sweethearts of Rhythm at Piney Woods School, a private boarding school in Mississippi, and William Alfred Woods, who was the first African-American to earn an accounting degree from Creighton University. Her grandfather Laurence C. Jones was a successful Mississippi educator and lynching survivor. The family lived in the Logan Fontenelle Housing Projects while Hughes' father attended college. Hughes grew up with a household of siblings. She found her love for music at a very young age, while repeatedly each night lying in bed listening to Everly Brothers and The Platters. In her early life, her parents did not have much money. She struggled to eat. In fact, she lied about her age to get her first job at the age of 14.

Hughes attended Duchesne Academy of the Sacred Heart in Omaha before her first pregnancy. She also went to the University of Nebraska Omaha and Creighton University taking Business Administration courses, her father's alma mater, but was not able to complete and receive a degree, which led to her getting a job as a sales manager at Howard University's radio station, WHUR-FM.

== Career ==
Before radio, in the mid-1960s, Hughes worked for an African American newspaper called the Omaha Star. Hughes began her career in 1969 at KOWH in Omaha, but left for Washington, D.C., after she was offered a job as an administrative assistant with Tony Brown at the School of Communications at Howard University. In 1973, she became General Sales Manager of the university's radio station, WHUR-FM, increasing station revenue from $250,000 to $3 million in her first year. In 1975, Hughes became the first woman vice president and general manager of a station in the nation's capital and created the format known as the "Quiet Storm," which revolutionized urban radio and was aired on over 480 stations nationwide.

During her marriage with Dewey Hughes in 1979, they set out to purchase a radio station. Successfully finding a lender after being denied thirty-two times by banks, in 1980 Hughes and then-husband Dewey founded Radio One, subsequently buying AM radio station WOL 1450 in Washington, D.C. After the previous employees had destroyed the facility, she faced financial difficulties and subsequently lost her home and moved with her young son to live at the station. Her fortunes began to change when she revamped the R&B station to a 24-hour talk radio format with the theme, "Information is Power." Hughes was the station's Morning Show Host for 11 years. In 1982 the bank had threatened to cease payments to Hughes investment unless she agreed to airing music. She decided to keep her station airing a talk format in the morning and music throughout the day. WOL is still the most-listened-to talk radio station in the nation's capital.

In 1987, Hughes bought radio station WMMJ with her company Radio One (now Urban One). In 1995, Radio One bought radio station WKYS.

Radio One went on to own 70 radio stations in nine major markets in the U.S. In 1999, Radio One became a publicly traded company, listed under the NASDAQ stock exchange. As of 2007, Hughes's son, Alfred Liggins, III, is CEO and president of Radio One, and Hughes as chairperson. Hughes is also a minority owner of BET industries.

In January 2004, Radio One launched TV One, a national cable and satellite television network which bills itself as the "lifestyle and entertainment network for African-American adults." Hughes interviews prominent personalities, usually in the entertainment industry, for the network's talk program TV One on One.

Both Cathy Hughes and her son, Alfred Liggins have been named Entrepreneur of the Year by the company Ernst & Young. She is a notable member of Alpha Kappa Alpha sorority.

In 2015, a local business organization unofficially named the corner of 4th Street and H Street NE in Washington, D.C. "Cathy Hughes Corner".

Hughes' life story is featured on the documentary series Profiles of African-American Success. In 2016, Hughes was inducted into the National Rhythm & Blues Hall of Fame.

In 2020, she accepted a position on the Board of Trustees at Creighton University in Omaha.

== Controversies ==
Hughes and Urban One wanted to open a casino in Richmond, Virginia, but were defeated by voters in 2021. Hughes later supported a second casino referendum effort in 2023. On November 3, 2023, audio recordings circulated from Urban One radio programming in which hosts discussed divisions within Richmond's Black community; during that exchange, the n-word was referenced.

== Personal life ==
Hughes was married to Alfred Liggins Jr from 1965 to 1967. Together they had one child, Alfred Liggins III, born January 30, 1965, in Omaha, Nebraska. She got pregnant when she was seventeen and her mom threw her out of her house.

Hughes married Dewey Hughes in 1979 and they divorced in 1987. They had no children together.

Cathy said that debt was overwhelming for Hughes. He was never an entrepreneur. She, on the other hand, was focused and knew she could pay back the 1 million dollars they were able to borrow from their "angel" lender. After her divorce and with looming debt, she ended up moving into the station with her son. When asked if it was hard or stressful to deal with, she said:

"No, number one I was in awe of Washington DC. I was in Georgetown. I haven't been able to get back there yet! During my struggling days, I had a prime corner. You would see the president having dinner at one of the restaurants."

Hughes is Catholic. As of 2018, she attended St Benedict the Moor Catholic Church, a Black parish, when in Omaha. She resides in Pasadena, Maryland.

== Awards ==
Cathy Hughes has titled many awards. Granted an honorary doctorate from Sojourner Douglass College in Baltimore in 1995. That accomplishment drove Hughes back to school 2 years later. In 1988, she was the first woman awarded the Lifetime Achievement Award at the twelfth annual ceremony. Hughes is also a member of the Maryland Chamber of Commerce's Business Hall of Fame. Jumping to the year 2000, she was awarded the First Annual Black History Hall of Fame Award. Following that she was presented the National Action Network's "Keepers of the Dream" award, which is an award that spotlights role models who contribute to and honor Martin Luther King, Jr.'s legacy.

Radio One is number nine on BET 100, with a net worth of $450.8 million for 2015.

== See also ==
- Laurence C. Jones
- Piney Woods Country Life School (Cathy Hughes serves as a Board Member)
