= Dewey Hughes =

American businessman (born 1932)

Dewey Hughes (born 1932) is an African American former radio personality and was Petey Greene's manager.

== Early life ==
Dewey Hughes was born in South Carolina in 1932.

== Career ==
Hughes was introduced to Petey Greene by his older brother Milo at Lorton Reformatory and hired Greene to work as a disc jockey at WOL. Hughes also worked as co-producer and director of Greene's television talk show Petey Greene's Washington from 1976 to 1982. Greene succumbed to liver cancer on January 10, 1984.

Hughes purchased WOL with his then-wife, Cathy Hughes, in Washington which became the cornerstone of the Radio One Network. He went on to win 12 Emmy Awards as a producer/director for an NBC affiliate.

== Personal life ==
Hughes was married to Cathy Hughes from 1979 to 1987 and currently lives in Los Angeles, California where he writes and produces music. He has a son, Michael Genet, an actor and screenwriter.

== In film ==
Hughes was portrayed by Chiwetel Ejiofor in the 2007 film Talk to Me. The screenplay for the film was written by his son, Michael Genet.
