= James Phelps =

James Phelps may refer to:

- James Phelps (actor), English actor
- James Phelps (congressman) (1822–1900), congressman from Connecticut
- James Phelps (musician) (1932–2010), American singer
- James I. Phelps (1875–1947), American judge in Oklahoma
- Jim Phelps, fictional character in Mission:Impossible
- Jimmy Phelps (born 1975), American racing driver
