= Cotton Blossom Singers =

American musical group

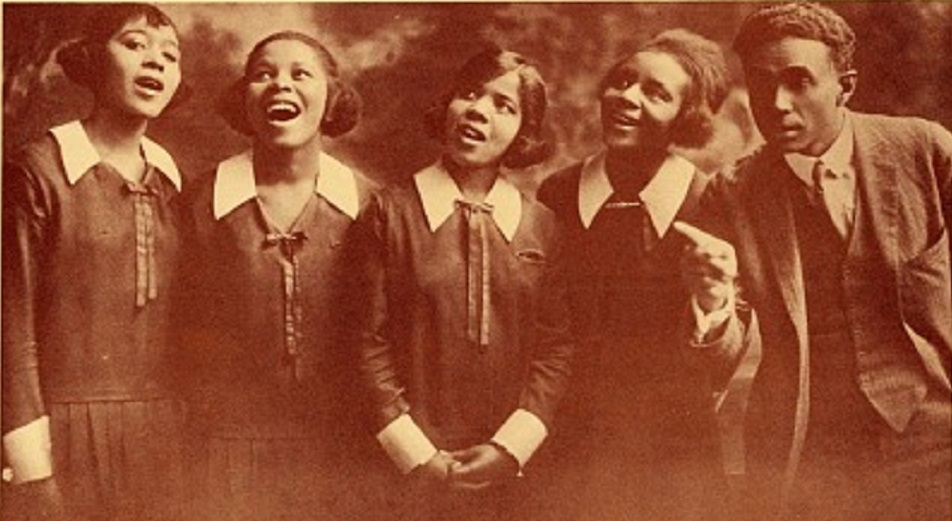
A mid-1920s Cotton Blossom Singers group

The Cotton Blossom Singers is the musical group of The Piney Woods School in Piney Woods, Mississippi. The first iteration performed during the 1920s and the Cotton Blossom Singers still operate. During its early years, up to 13 groups toured the United States.

== Formation ==
The Piney Woods School was founded by Laurence C. Jones and the first classes were held outside in 1909. Similar to earlier ventures by blacks, the school had financial difficulties and the Cotton Blossom Singers was formed to raise money for the building. Jones's wife, Grace Morris Allen Jones, led the first iteration of the group although it is disputed what year they first sang. Historian Beth Day thinks that this first happened in spring 1921, but historian Alferdteen Harrison has suggested that the first group sang in summer 1923. Grace's role was sometimes to be the pianist, but she did not think of herself as a musician. The first group of the Cotton Blossom Singers sang spirituals and folk songs. In 1926, four groups of students toured through the United States; later, up to 13 groups toured at the same time, each group assigned to their own region.

The name Cotton Blossom Singers was only used when the groups were touring, and they were called The Piney Woods Singers in their hometown. Some interviewees thought that Laurence C. Jones used the national tour name so that whites in the northern and eastern United States would be interested. Some of those whites became confused due to the Cotton Blossom Singers not being a minstrel show. Each group had issues booking hotels during the 1920s due to their race. They attached their luggage to cars, while usually eating food that had to be kept cold and sometimes eating food cooked outside over a fire. The founder of the company Mentholatum, Albert Alexander Hyde, gave the Cotton Blossom Singers a car containing essentials such as bunk beds and cooking tools with a similar car being built soon after. The groups toured the United States for up to 16 months. The first all-female group was known as the Sensational Six.

== Musical content ==
A performance by the Cotton Blossom Singers usually featured black spirituals and the reciting of Paul Laurence Dunbar's poetry. The spirituals included "Steal Away", "I Couldn't Hear Nobody Pray", and "Chariot's Comin'". During an Oklahoma tour, whites asked a group to sing "Dixie" and members of the group who memorized the song sang it so that the whites would not feel offended. The group initially never sang "Dixie" before that, due to the offensive nature of the song. The first groups of the Cotton Blossom Singers knew the songs from their communities, but teachers later taught the students. The Cotton Blossom Singers performed in black churches, white churches, schools, rotary clubs, ladies' aid societies, and on local radio.

== Impact ==
Four prior members, who were blind, formed the band Five Blind Boys of Mississippi after they gained a new member. The CD The Piney Woods School Cotton Blossom Singers in concert was released in 2002. The 2010 book It's Cotton Blossom Time details the history of the Cotton Blossom Singers. Groups of the Cotton Blossom Singers continue to perform, including during the spring of 2021.
