= Five Blind Boys =

Five Blind Boys may refer to:

- Five Blind Boys of Mississippi (1936–1994), a gospel group from Jackson, Mississippi
- Five Blind Boys of Alabama (1939–present), a gospel group from Talladega, Alabama
