= Little Ax =

Little Ax may refer to:

- Willmer "Little Ax" Broadnax (1916–1992), an American singer
- Little Axe (born 1949), an American musician
