= She Hate Me =

2004 film by Spike Lee

- Theatrical release poster
- Directed by: Spike Lee
- Screenplay by: Michael Genet; Spike Lee
- Story by: Michael Genet
- Produced by: Spike Lee; Preston Holmes; Fernando Sulichin
- Starring: Anthony Mackie; Kerry Washington; Ellen Barkin; Monica Bellucci; Jim Brown; Jamel Debbouze; Brian Dennehy; Woody Harrelson; Bai Ling; Q-Tip; Dania Ramirez; John Turturro
- Cinematography: Matthew Libatique
- Edited by: Barry Alexander Brown
- Music by: Terence Blanchard
- Production companies: 40 Acres and a Mule Filmworks; Pathé
- Distributed by: Sony Pictures Classics
- Release date: July 30, 2004
- Running time: 138 minutes
- Country: United States
- Language: English
- Budget: $9 million
- Box office: $1.5 million

She Hate Me is a 2004 American independent comedy-drama film directed by Spike Lee. The film stars Anthony Mackie, Kerry Washington, Ellen Barkin, Monica Bellucci, Brian Dennehy, Woody Harrelson, Bai Ling, and John Turturro. The film touches on a variety of themes such as corporate greed, race, sexuality, and politics. As with many of Lee's films, the film garnered controversy. Unlike many prior works, Spike Lee does not have an acting credit in this film.

The film was shot mostly on location in New York City, including each of the city's five boroughs. It was released on July 30, 2004, and grossed almost half a million dollars at the North American box office in limited release, with a worldwide revenue of $1.5 million. It received generally negative reception from critics.

== Plot ==
John Henry "Jack" Armstrong is a financially successful and upwardly mobile executive at a biotechnology firm who, following the suicide of a colleague, Dr. Herman Schiller, is falsely accused of securities fraud by his superior, Leland Powell. Armstrong's assets are frozen, and he finds himself unable to maintain his quality of life.

In order to make ends meet, he becomes a sperm donor, initially by acquiescing to the desires of Fatima Goodrich, his ex-fiancée who came out as a lesbian and now wants a child. There is still unresolved bitterness and tension between them over Armstrong and Goodrich's prior relationship, as before coming out, Armstrong discovered her cheating on him with another woman. Goodrich and her girlfriend, Alex Guerrero, offer Armstrong a substantial sum of money to impregnate them both. This leads to Goodrich goading Armstrong into establishing a business in which groups of lesbians come over to his house and pay him $10,000 each to have sex with them in order to become pregnant. This business becomes a success, along with many of the women enjoying the intercourse with him.

One of the women whom Armstrong impregnates is the daughter of a mafia boss, Don Angelo Bonasera. Armstrong's employers learn of his impregnation business, and they use it in their campaign to sully his image in order to deflect attention from their own criminal business activities. Conflict is also depicted in the turbulent relationship between Armstrong's mother and his dependent diabetic father.

Armstrong's situation is portrayed as a cause célèbre, with protests being held in support of or against him, and the news media interviewing people on the street with respect to his sexual activities. Armstrong is called before a committee of the United States Senate investigating his alleged securities fraud, where both his services to lesbians and his relationship to the "Bonasera crime family" are raised.

Armstrong's situation is compared, to the plight of Frank Wills, the security guard who discovered the break-in that led to the Watergate scandal, which brought down President Nixon. He eventually wins the case and is seen with nineteen of the children he helped conceive. Powell, meanwhile, is eventually arrested for his crimes.

Armstrong and Goodrich come to terms with their lingering feelings for one another, and with the mutual attraction they share for Guerrero. They then begin a three-way polyamorous relationship, and Armstrong apparently maintains a friendship with all of the eighteen women who became pregnant by him.

== Cast ==
- Anthony Mackie as John Henry "Jack" Armstrong
- Kerry Washington as Fatima Goodrich
- Jim Brown as Geronimo Armstrong
- John Turturro as Don Angelo Bonasera
- Q-Tip as Vada Huff
- Woody Harrelson as Leland Powell
- Dania Ramirez as Alex Guerrero
- Monica Bellucci as Simona Bonasera
- Lonette McKee as Lottie Armstrong
- Michael Genet as Jamal Armstrong
- Ossie Davis as Judge Buchanan
- Brian Dennehy as Chairman Billy Church
- Ellen Barkin as Margo Chadwick
- David Bennent as Dr. Herman Schiller
- Joie Lee as Gloria Reid
- Chiwetel Ejiofor as Frank Wills
- Michole Briana White as Nadiyah
- Paula Jai Parker as Evelyn
- Murphy Guyer as John Erlichman
- Bai Ling as Oni
- Sarita Choudhury as Song
- Jamel Debbouze as Doak
- Isiah Whitlock as Agent Amos Flood
- Lemon as Eugenio Martinez
- Kim Director as Grace
- T.V. Carpio as Gail
- Rick Aiello as Rocco Bonasera
- Don Harvey as G. Gordon Liddy

== Production ==
Spike Lee based the title of the film on XFL football player Rod Smart, who gained some notoriety by nicknaming himself "He Hate Me". The main character in the film references Smart when explaining why he has decided to nickname his ex-fiancée "She Hate Me".

Before filming, Lee hired lesbian author and sex columnist Tristan Taormino as a consultant. Taormino put Lee through "lesbian boot camp", in which she taught him about lesbian life through books, visits to lesbian bars, and panel discussions.

Filming, which was done on Super 16, took place in 28 days in New York City. The film featured a close-up scene of a real human birth, similarly to Lee's 1990 film Mo' Better Blues.

Raul Midon sang the theme song for the movie, "Adam 'N' Eve 'N' Eve". In the film, Armstrong's brother disapproves of his impregnating lesbians and also uses the phrase "Adam 'N' Eve 'N' Eve.

== Reception ==
=== Box office ===
The film grossed a total of $1,522,377 at the box office.

=== Critical response ===
She Hate Me received a sharply negative reaction from film critics. On Rotten Tomatoes, it has an approval rating of 20% based on 102 reviews, with an average score of 4.10/10. The site's critic consensus reads, "She Hate Me can't decide if it wants to be a commentary on corporate greed or a sex farce". On Metacritic, the film has a score of 30 out of 100 based on 37 reviews, indicating "generally unfavorable reviews".

Many of the criticisms were focused on the film's messaging and the excesses of the plot. Roger Ebert noted, "She Hate Me contains enough for five movies, but has no idea which of those movies it wants to be. Some critics called it offensive, with Owen Gleiberman of Entertainment Weekly giving the film an "F" grade and writing it "manages to be at once racist, homophobic, utterly fake, and unbearably tedious. This time, it's Spike Lee who's doing the bamboozling." Wesley Morris of The Boston Globe opined, "the movie is rude and ridiculous, fearless up to a point, and breathtakingly hungry to provoke", but it "struggles between the audaciousness of its premise and an underlying defensiveness. The title...sounds like a jokey rebuke to people who've called Lee a misogynist. Yet when Lee tries to sober up She Hate Me with apology, to stitch a heart on its sleeve, the movie feels untrue to itself."

The film also generated controversy for its depiction of lesbian women and for portraying them as wanting to have sex with a man for procreative purposes. Trinidadian poet Erica Doyle commented that at the film's center is "an extensive male fantasy of having sex with lots of women — women who are usually inaccessible to most men." In response, Tristan Taormino said the film is not meant to represent all lesbians, while Lee explained that if the film showed lesbians having children in other ways, such as through adoption or IVF, it would not be as cinematically interesting. Lee added, "[Tristan] said, 'Spike, there's no way in the world you can make a film that every lesbian likes.' I'm glad she said that. It made me realize that lesbians are like any other group. They're not monolithic."

On the other hand, Stella Papamichael of the BBC called the film "fascinating from start to finish," and Scott Foundas of Variety lauded it as "a scabrous, provocative and often funny social satire" with praise for the film's ensemble cast. Roger Ebert was also one of the few critics to give a positive review, awarding it three stars out of four.

Ebert wrote the film "will get some terrible reviews. Scorched earth reviews. Its logic, style, presumption and sexual politics will be ridiculed. [...] Many of the things you read in those reviews may be true from a conventional point of view. Most of the critics will be on safe ground. I will seem to be wrong. Seeming to be wrong about this movie is one of the most interesting things I've done recently."

Ebert argued Lee knows the lesbian plot line is absurd, but uses it to "confront the pious liberal horror about such concepts as the inexhaustible black stud." He ultimately said the film "is alive and confrontational and aggressively in our face, and the man who made it has abandoned all caution, even to the point of refusing to signal his intentions, to put in a wink to let us see he knows what he's doing...She Hate Me invites anger and analysis about the stereotypes it appears to celebrate; a film that attacked those stereotypes would inspire yawns. Think what you want on an Politically Correct level, but concede that She Hate Me is audacious and recklessly risky."

Later criticism reexamined and discussed the film's themes. In a 2020 essay for Little White Lies, Erik Nielsen argued the film was misunderstood at the time of its release and that it is "a funny, sometimes ridiculous, yet ultimately insightful commentary on race inside American capitalism." Liam Carroll of The Spool posited that in making Jack an object available for women, Lee is "perhaps...trying to turn the objectification of women on its head: Jack often strips for his clients, who woo and scream and goad him on...Or perhaps Lee is commenting on the hoary old stereotype of the black male's alleged potent sexual virility. Problem is, this all falls apart when you bring in the lesbian factor. If these were straight women ogling Jack and using him as a mere sperm bank, then that would be one thing, but making these women lesbians feels nonsensical at best, and reductive at worst." Carroll concluded the themes of corporate greed and sexual mores were more effectively explored in Lee's previous works.

=== Award nominations ===
- BET Comedy Awards
  - Outstanding Directing for a Theatrical Film (Spike Lee)
  - Outstanding Writing for a Theatrical Film (Michael Genet and Spike Lee)
- Black Reel Awards
  - Best Breakthrough Performance (Anthony Mackie)
  - Best Director (Spike Lee)
  - Best Original Score (Terence Blanchard)
  - Best Screenplay, Original or Adapted (Michael Genet and Spike Lee)
