= Paul Foster (singer) =

American musician

Paul Foster (July 12, 1920 – August 20, 1995) was born in Grand Cane, Louisiana. He sang with the legendary gospel group, the Soul Stirrers, from 1950 to 1963. Foster sang second lead alongside two other gospel greats, Rebert Harris and Sam Cooke. Foster possessed a powerful, mournful tenor voice, a perfect foil to both Harris' and Cooke's sweeter more-flowery tenor styles. During his long career in gospel music, Foster also sang for other quartets such as the Rising Stars and the Golden Echoes. While nearly all of Foster's recordings take place in the recording studio, his powerful voice can be heard on the Soul Stirrers' dynamic performance on the album "The Great Shrine Concert of 1955", especially on the song "Be With Me Jesus", where Foster leads the group with his strong testimonial style.

== Background ==
Paul Foster was born on July 12, 1920, in Grand Cane, Louisiana, to Thomas and Lillie Williams Foster. As a young child, he sang in the family group ('The Fosters', which consisted of Paul and his six sisters: Jannie Mae, Hattie Mae, Ola Mae, Anna Mae, Midloise, and Patrice). Paul had one brother, Mitchell "Mitch" Foster. When he was 16, he joined the 'Hurricane Bluff Spiritual Gospel Singers'.

== Early career ==
During the Second World War he served in the army at Fort Ord, California. and afterwards moved to Oakland, California. He brought his family: wife, Mary and children, Esther, Mary, Paul Jr., Thomas and Barbara Ann to live with him. Here he joined and recorded with the 'Rising Stars' on the Berkeley-based Pacific label. Foster also sang with 'The Paramounts' and the 'Golden Harps'. After the death of his father in 1948 he joined 'Golden Echoes'. With this group he recorded for Specialty Recordings, for which he would later record with the Soul Stirrers. After only a few months he joined the 'Houston All-Stars'.

== Soul Stirrers ==
When he performed with the Houstonaires (or Houston All-stars, the sources are different) in late 1949 he was spotted by the Soul Stirrers who also sang during that show. A few weeks later he was asked join the Soul Stirrers, which traditionally had been a group of five, but was now expanding to be a group of seven with Foster and another singer joining the ensemble. The other singers in the group at this time included R. H. Harris, James H. Medlock, S. R. Crain, T. L. Bruster, J. J. Farley, and R. B. Robinson. His father died around the time he joined the group. By the time of a 1953 performance at the Wheat Street Baptist Church, Medlock had left the ensemble and they were now performing as a group of 6.

In 1954 the Soul Stirrers headlined a gospel festival at the Municipal Auditorium in Atlanta; with Sam Cooke replacing R. H. Harris. When R. H. Harris left the group Foster did all the leads for two months but that was too much, up to the point of him getting migraines. That's when Sam Cooke stepped in to lighten the load. He again was the only lead singer for a few months when Johnnie Taylor left the group. Foster would stay with the Soul Stirrers until 1963.

== Later career ==
He then moved to Los Angeles to start a barbecue restaurant and sang with groups like the 'Sims Brothers' and the 'Los Angeles Golden Crowns'. But not for long. In 1965 he would become Reverend Foster, which was in line with his great religiosity. He became the pastor of the Union Baptist Church in Vallejo where he stayed until he retired in the early eighties. It was here that he died on August 20, 1995. He is interred in his hometown of Grand Cane, Louisiana in the Friendship Baptist Church cemetery.
