= Petey Greene =

American radio talk show host (1931–1984)

- Born: Ralph Waldo Greene, Jr. January 23, 1931; Washington, D.C., United States
- Died: January 10, 1984 (aged 52); Washington, D.C., United States
- Spouse: Judy Greene
- Children: 4
- Presenting career
- Stations: WOL; WDCA
- Style: Radio talk show host
- Country: United States
- Website: www.peteygreene.org

Ralph Waldo "Petey" Greene, Jr. (January 23, 1931 – January 10, 1984), was an American television and radio talk-show host. A two-time Emmy Award-winner, Greene overcame drug addiction and a prison sentence for armed robbery to become one of the most prominent media personalities in Washington, D.C. On his shows, Greene often discussed issues such as racism, poverty, drug usage, and current events among others.

== Early life ==
Born Ralph Waldo Greene, Jr. in Washington D.C., the son of Ralph Waldo Greene, Sr. and Jacqueline Abernathy Greene, he was raised by his maternal grandmother, Margaret "Maggie" Floyd, who he referred to as "A'nt Pig" (Aunt Pig).

Greene attended Stevens Elementary School and Cardozo Senior High School in Washington. He dropped out of high school in the ninth grade and enlisted in the United States Army at age 16 in 1947. He served in the Korean War as a medic and was honorably discharged from service in 1953.

In January 1960, Greene was convicted of armed robbery in Washington and sentenced to ten years imprisonment at Lorton Reformatory in Fairfax County, Virginia. There he became the prison disc jockey, which made him popular and well-liked by fellow prisoners. His loquaciousness soon proved beneficial in other ways; in May 1966, Greene persuaded a fellow inmate to climb to the top of the prison water tower and threaten suicide, so that Greene would be able to "save his life" by talking him down. "It took me six months to get him to go up there," he later recalled on his talk show. This act, combined with his generally good behavior, earned him a reduction in his prison sentence and parole the following week.

== Career ==
In the summer of 1966, Greene was hired by Dewey Hughes to work as a disc jockey at AM radio station WOL/1450 and to host his own show. Rapping With Petey Greene aired in the Washington Metropolitan Area throughout the late 1960s and early 1970s. His prominence grew, and soon he was hosting his own television show, Petey Greene's Washington, with a six-year run from 1976 to 1982 on WDCA/20. This show won two Emmy Awards. On March 8, 1978, he was invited as a guest to the White House by United States President Jimmy Carter to honor visiting Yugoslavian President Josip Broz Tito. He famously quipped to the Washington Post that he "stole a spoon" during the evening gala.

In 1981, Greene had radio personality Howard Stern on his show for what was one of Stern's first television appearances. Stern appeared on the show in blackface, which Greene found funny. The audio of this interview was eventually played as part of the 2007 Sirius satellite radio documentary The History of Howard Stern, in which Stern called Greene "way ahead of his time". The two shared a mutual admiration, as they both dealt with such controversial subjects as race and politics, with Stern since recognizing him as an influence. Stern later called Greene a "broadcasting genius" in his 1993 book Private Parts.

== Activism ==
Aside from being a radio personality and talk show host, Greene was also a community activist, joining the United Planning Organization and founding the Ralph Waldo Greene Community Centre and Efforts for Ex-Convicts. This organization remains devoted to helping former prisoners succeed in legitimate ways and to advocate prison reform. He rallied against poverty and racism on his shows and on the streets, participating in demonstrations during the height of his popularity. Following the assassination of Dr. Martin Luther King Jr. in April 1968, and during the subsequent riots that erupted throughout the United States, Greene made statements on air that were credited with helping quell the riots in Washington, D.C.

== Death ==
Greene was diagnosed with liver cancer in 1982. As a result of his failing health, his career as a radio and television personality ended. Greene died on January 10, 1984, thirteen days before his 53rd birthday. He was survived by his wife, Judy C. Greene, and their four children: Ralph Waldo III (affectionately known to family as Pine), Petra, Renee, and Melanie. Approximately 10,000 mourners lined up outside Union Wesley AME Zion Church to pay their last respects.

== Legacy ==
Greene's autobiography, Laugh If You Like, Ain't a Damn Thing Funny, was published in 2003. The book is a result of conversations recorded between Greene and author Lurma Rackley.

Greene was portrayed by Don Cheadle in the 2007 film Talk to Me, which was inspired by his life and career.

Greene was also profiled in a 2009 episode of the PBS series Independent Lens entitled "Adjust Your Color: The Truth of Petey Greene".
