= Mighty High (song) =

Single by Mighty Clouds Of Joy

from the album Kickin'
- B-side: "Touch My Soul"
- Released: January 1976
- Genre: Disco; Rhythm and blues
- Length: 4:46; 3:36 (single edit)
- Songwriters: Dave Crawford, R. Downing
- Producer: Dave Crawford

Mighty Clouds Of Joy singles chronology
"Amazing Grace" (1975)	"Mighty High" (1976)

"Mighty High" is 1975 disco/R&B single by American gospel group Mighty Clouds of Joy. It was written by David Crawford.

== Charts ==
The single proved to be very popular with disco fans as the song stayed at number one on the disco/dance chart for five weeks, and remained on the chart for a total of fourteen weeks Mighty High" was their biggest hit on both the soul chart, peaking at #22, and on the Billboard Hot 100, peaking at #69.

== Chart performance ==
Chart (1976)	Peak position
U.S. Billboard Disco Action	1
US Billboard Hot 100	69
US Hot Soul Singles (Billboard)	22

== Cover versions ==
- A cover by Gloria Gaynor with The Trammps made the song a hit once again on the Disco/Dance chart. It reached #12 in 1997.
