= Mighty Clouds of Joy =

American traditional gospel music quartet

- Origin: Los Angeles, California, U.S.
- Genres: Traditional gospel, disco
- Years active: 1961–2012
- Labels: Light, Peacock, Epic, ABC, Word, Myrrh, Intersound, EMI Gospel, CBS, Dunhill/ABC, MCG
- Past members: Joe Ligon (deceased); Richard Wallace (deceased); Johnny Martin (deceased); Elmeo Franklin (deceased); Ermant Franklin (deceased); Paul Beasley(deceased); Michael Cook (deceased); Clayton Hammond Jr. (deceased); Dwight Gordon; Terry Fuller; Michael McCowin; Leon Polk; Hamp Carlton; Artis Turnbough (deceased); Alphonso McClain; Eddie "Spanky" Alford (deceased); Lamanuel Boykin; Charles McElveen; Ron Staples; Johnny Valentine; Ervin Williams; Ronald Clark Sr; Kevin Wilson Sr

The Mighty Clouds of Joy were an American traditional gospel music quartet.

== Career ==
The Mighty Clouds of Joy was formed in 1959 in Los Angeles as a tradition-based style group. It wasn't until 1961 as the group became famous, they added bass, drums, and keyboards to the standard guitar backup and developed a funky sound that split the difference between gospel and rhythm and blues. In a break with tradition, the groups sound incorporated Soul, R&B, and Rock; all of which flourishes in their musical mix (one of their early hits was produced by Gamble and Huff) without diluting the religious essence of their material. Unlike other gospel groups, its members dressed stylishly — they used the same tailor as the Temptations — and worked slick choreography into their act Thus, not realizing they were setting a standard and paving a way for future gospel soul groups for decades to come, they became one of the most influential gospel groups in the US. The long-lived group flourished throughout the rest of the 20th century, scoring numerous Grammy Awards and nominations, as well as several hit albums along the way.

The Mighty Clouds of Joy developed a fan base much like the soul Pop and R&B groups. Their pictures are even on display in the Apollo Theater.

Based in Los Angeles, the original group members included Joe Ligon (d. 2016), Johnny Martin (d. 1987), Ermant Franklin Jr. (d. 1996), Artis Turnbough (d. 1999), Elmeo Franklin (d. 2008), Richard Wallace (d. 2020), Leon Polk (d. 1998), and David Walker (who also recorded several tracks with Link Wray under the name Bunker Hill).

Joe Ligon (born Willie Joe Ligon in Troy, Alabama on October 11, 1936) died on December 11, 2016, at age 80.

While reviewing the group's 1974 crossover LP It's Time, Robert Christgau wrote in Christgau's Record Guide: Rock Albums of the Seventies (1981), "You'd figure the showiest of all gospel groups would sell out with some flair, but the vocal transfigurations — that old Wilson Pickett (and Julius Cheeks) unhh born again — aren't the only reason this is one of the best LPs ever to come out of Philadelphia. For once, the songs — many of them from producer Dave Crawford, whose spirit must have been moved — include virtually no filler, not even (especially not even) the one that takes off from the group's name. Nicest conceit: how hard it is to be soft in a 'Stoned World.'"

== Discography ==
=== Albums ===
- 1964: Family Circle (Peacock) PLP 114
- 1965: A Bright Side (Peacock) PLP 121
- 1966: Live at Music Hall (Peacock) PLP 134
- 1966: Presenting the Untouchable (Peacock) PLP 151
- 1972: Mighty Clouds of Joy Live (At The Apollo)
- 1974: It's Time (Dunhill/ABC)
- 1975: Kickin' (ABC)
- 1977: The Truth is the Power (ABC) (Reissue-Myrrh)
- 1977: Live and Direct (ABC)
- 1979: Changing Times (Epic/CBS)
- 1980: Cloudburst (Myrrh/CBS)
- 1982: Miracle Man (Myrrh)
- 1983: Sing and Shout (Myrrh/Word)
- 1987: Catching On (Word)
- 1989: Night Song (Word)
- 1990: Pray for Me (Live) (Word)
- 1995: Power (Intersound)
- 1996: Live in Charleston (Live) (Intersound)
- 1999: It Was You (Light Records)
- 2002: I Want to Thank You (EMI Gospel)
- 2005: In the House of the Lord: Live in Houston (EMI Gospel)
- 2007: Movin' (EMI Gospel)
- 2010: At the Revival (EMI Gospel)
- 2011: 50-Year Celebration (EMI Gospel)
- 2013: All That I Am Chapter 1 (MCG Records)
- 2014: Down Memory Lane: Chapter 2 (MCG Records)
- 2016: Rebirth (Asah Entertainment)

=== Compilation albums ===
- 1973: The Best of the Mighty Clouds of Joy (Peacock/ABC) (Reissue-MCA)
- 1978: The Very Best of the Mighty Clouds of Joy (ABC)
- 1982: Request Line (Myrrh/Word)
- 1994: Faith, Mercy, Glory (King)
- 2002: 20th Century Masters – The Millennium Collection: The Best of the Mighty Clouds of Joy (MCA/Peacock)

=== Singles ===
- 1960: "Steal Away to Jesus" (Peacock Records)
- 1975: "Amazing Grace"; R&B#4 UK#15 US Hot Dance Club Play No. 2
- 1975: "Mighty High"; US#69 US Hot Dance Club Play No. 1
