= Paul Owens (gospel singer) =

American singer

Paul Owens (July 27, 1924 – October 17, 2002) was one of the foremost artists in African American gospel music, performing with The Dixie Hummingbirds, the Swan Silvertones and the Sensational Nightingales.

== Biography ==
Owens was born in Greensboro, North Carolina on July 27, 1924. He first began singing gospel at church in Philadelphia at age 13. He would later start as a soloist with the Israelite Gospel Singers, the Baystate Gospel Singers and the Evangelist Singers. In 1942 he joined a group known as the Nightingales (later the Sensational Nightingales, which featured Julius "June Cheeks") before moving to the Dixie Hummingbirds in 1948. Paired with Ira Tucker, they adopted a daring style, which they called "trickeration", in which they would mix melisma with intricate harmonies, sharing the lead while often improvising phrases.

Owens left the group in 1952 to join the Swan Silvertones, to whose aggressive shouting style he added the smooth harmonies and melodious tenor for which he was known as a member of the Hummingbirds. He later left them to join the Sensational Nightingales, for whom he sang as a baritone, then returned to the Hummingbirds in 1989.

Owens died from cancer at the Hospital of the University of Pennsylvania on October 17, 2002, aged 78.
