= Laurence C. Jones =

President of Piney Woods Country Life School in Rankin County, Mississippi

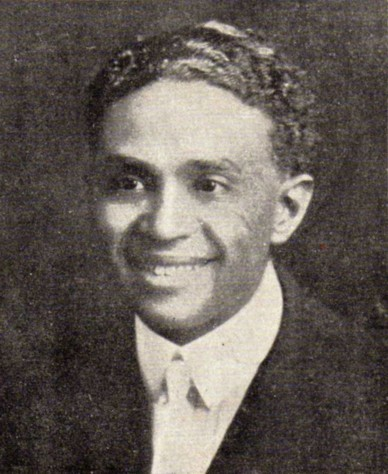
- Laurence C. Jones, date unknown
- Born: November 21, 1882; St. Joseph, Missouri
- Died: July 13, 1975 (aged 92); Jackson, Mississippi
- Occupation: Educator
- Known for: Founder of Piney Woods Country Life School
- Spouse: Grace Morris Allen
- Children: Laurence Jr., Turner, and Helen

Laurence Clifton Jones (November 21, 1882 – July 13, 1975), was the founder and long-time president of Piney Woods Country Life School in Rankin County, Mississippi. A noted educational innovator, Jones spent his adult life supporting the educational advancement of rural African-American students in the segregated South.

== Early life ==
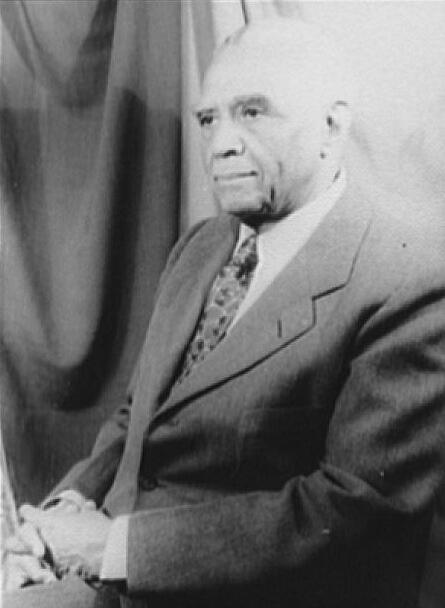
Laurence C. Jones (1955) Photo by Carl Van Vechten

Jones came from a family of educators, with an uncle who founded the Woodstock Manual Labor Institute in Woodstock, Michigan in 1846. Before he was married to her, his future wife was the founder of the Grace M. Allen Industrial School for African American students in Burlington, Iowa.

After graduating from the University of Iowa in 1908 Jones turned down an offer to teach at the prestigious Tuskegee Institute in Alabama, instead opting to teach at the small Utica Institute, a school for African American children located in Utica, Mississippi. While he was there he was recruited by the congregation of St. John's Baptist Church of D'Lo, Mississippi to found a school. The efforts of the church to start a school for their children had been initially checked by white residents of the area.

== Founding Piney Woods ==
It was when he learned about rural Rankin County, Mississippi, which had an eighty percent illiteracy rate, that Jones identified his personal mission. In 1909 Jones agreed to teach a poor youngster to read, and soon found himself teaching a small group of students. He started the Piney Woods School with just $2 and three students. A local freed slave named Ed Taylor gave Jones 40 acres (160,000 m^{2}) and an abandoned sheep shed to start his Piney Woods School.

After marrying Grace Morris Allen in 1912, Jones built a larger school to accommodate the large number of students interested in attending. A local white sawmill owner donated the wood for that building, and dozens of other donations arrived, including cattle for milk, a large amount of land near the school, and cash. Throughout the rest of her life, Grace was pivotal in helping her husband fund-raise for the school, and by teaching courses in domestic science.

In his popular book How to Stop Worrying and Start Living, author and motivator Dale Carnegie told a story of how Jones had survived a near-lynching in 1918 by demonstrating to the white mob how passionate he was about his efforts to educate African-American children. Several accounts support Carnegie's account that after being persuaded not to lynch him, the crowd actually ended up collecting money to give to Jones to support his school. Carnegie quoting him saying "No man can force me to stoop low enough to hate him".

== Methodology ==
Jones is attributed with utilizing the "Booker T. Washington model" of training African Americans to be good workers. He followed the Jim Crow social codes of the South, and consequently his school thrived without controversy and with encouragement from white people throughout Mississippi. Jones taught students about agriculture, carpentry, dairy farming and construction, and under his guidance students were responsible for building many of the facilities on the campus, starting with a boys' dorm in 1922.

In 1929, with the arrival of Martha Louise Morrow Foxx to serve as principal, the Mississippi Blind School for Negroes was founded on the campus; it eventually moved to Jackson, Mississippi.

With assistance from his wife Jones led several singing groups across the South, the Midwest and the East on fundraising tours. The schools' Five Blind Boys of Mississippi, the Cotton Blossom Singers and the International Sweethearts of Rhythm were three of several acts. Beginning in the 1930s, the school also sponsored baseball teams as part of the fund-raising efforts. Jones appeared on the This Is Your Life television show in the 1950s, and after telling his story asked viewers to each send in $1 to support the school. This bid eventually raised $700,000, with which Jones began the schools' endowment fund, which was reported to be at $7,000,000 when Jones died in 1975.

== Recognition ==
Jones received honorary doctorates from Clarke College, Cornell College, University of Dubuque, and Otterbein College. He also earned an honorary Master of Arts from the Tuskegee Institute.

He was recognized for his contributions to the education of African American children by the University of Iowa when college president Virgil Hancher named him one of the University's most outstanding alumni in 1954. Jones also sat on boards for the Mississippi Federation of Colored Women's Clubs and the state executive committee for the Y.M.C.A. He was also the author of several books, including Up Through Difficulties, published in 1910, Piney Woods and Its Story, published in 1923, and The Bottom Rail, published in 1933.

Jones received the Silver Buffalo Award, the highest commendation of the Boy Scouts of America, in 1970.

== Legacy ==
Laurence C. Jones died in 1975. His daughter, Helen, was part of the influential World War II-era and she played trombone in a swing band called the International Sweethearts of Rhythm, which was originally formed at the school. His granddaughter, Cathy Hughes, served on the board of Piney Woods as of 2005,.

In 2007 the U.S. Congress dedicated the Laurence C. and Grace M. Jones Post Office Building in Piney Woods, Mississippi in honor of the couples' legacy in the community.

== Works ==
- "The bottom rail; addresses and papers on the Negro in the lowlands of Mississippi and on inter-racial relations in the South during twenty-five years." New York [etc.] Fleming H. Revell Company [c1935]
- "Piney Woods and its story." New York, Fleming H. Revell Company [c1922] at HathiTrust
- "The spirit of Piney Woods." New York, Fleming H. Revell company [c1931] at HathiTrust
