= Talk to Me (2007 film) =

2007 film by Kasi Lemmons

- Theatrical release poster
- Directed by: Kasi Lemmons
- Written by: Michael Genet; Rick Famuyiwa
- Produced by: Mark Gordon; Sidney Kimmel; Joe Fries; Josh McLaughlin
- Starring: Don Cheadle; Chiwetel Ejiofor; Taraji P. Henson; Cedric the Entertainer; Mike Epps; Martin Sheen
- Cinematography: Stéphane Fontaine
- Edited by: Terilyn A. Shropshire
- Music by: Terence Blanchard
- Production companies: Sidney Kimmel Entertainment; The Mark Gordon Company; Pelagius Films
- Distributed by: Focus Features
- Release dates: June 22, 2007 (LA Film Festival); July 13, 2007 (United States)
- Running time: 118 minutes
- Country: United States
- Language: English
- Budget: $15 million
- Box office: $4.7 million

Talk to Me is a 2007 biographical film directed by Kasi Lemmons and starring Don Cheadle, Chiwetel Ejiofor, Taraji P. Henson, Cedric the Entertainer, Mike Epps, and Martin Sheen. It is about Washington, D.C. radio personality Ralph "Petey" Greene, an ex-con who became a popular talk show host and community activist, and Dewey Hughes, his friend and manager. The film spans the time period May 1966 to January 1984, ending with Greene's memorial service.

The film premiered as the opening night film of the 2007 Los Angeles Film Festival, on June 22, 2007. It opened in North America in a limited release on July 13, 2007, and nationwide on August 3, 2007.

== Plot ==
Petey Greene is in prison when he meets Dewey Hughes, who is there visiting his brother. Dewey treats him with disdain, calling him a "miscreant". In their conversation, Petey discovers that Dewey is a radio executive. Petey subsequently assists the warden by talking down a fellow prisoner and shortly afterward obtains his release.

Petey shows up at Dewey’s radio station in Washington, D.C., WOL, and claims that Dewey promised him a job upon his release from prison. As a result of causing a ruckus at the station, he is rebuffed. Petey then begins picketing the station drawing larger and larger crowds. To stop the protests, Dewey finally asks Petey to meet him at a pool hall. Dewey easily beats him in a game of Nine-ball, but decides to give Petey a chance on the air.

Petey takes over a shift on the station, but it is disastrous as he vomits from nervousness and insults Berry Gordy. Station owner E.G. Sonderling demands that he be removed at once and not given a job. Later, Dewey, dejected, goes to have a drink in a bar where he hears the patrons talking enthusiastically about Petey. He decides to give Petey another chance. In order to do so, he locks the staff in their offices and takes over the studio. Petey starts his show, and once Mr. Sonderling is released from his office, he demands that the police be called to eject Petey. As they are arguing, all the telephone lines light up with listeners wanting to talk to Petey. As a result, he is given the job. “Telling it like it is”, Petey becomes highly popular on the air. His girlfriend, Vernell, catches him with another woman, and he is kicked out of his home and moves in with Dewey temporarily.

Petey goes on the air after Dr. Martin Luther King, Jr. is assassinated, and becomes a voice of reason as rioters run amok in the streets of Washington in the aftermath. He is the MC for a free James Brown concert at Georgetown University meant to calm tempers, but shows up drunk. Nonetheless, his remarks are well-accepted by the crowd, and James Brown tells him that he can introduce him anytime.

Petey’s popularity gains him his own television show, and his star continues to rise. Dewey gets him invited onto The Tonight Show with Johnny Carson, but Petey is reluctant to go on. Vernell tells Dewey that Petey doesn’t want to go on, but Dewey insists it will be fine. Petey goes on, alienates the audience, and his appearance is a disaster. Dewey and Petey fight backstage, and both are arrested and spend the night in jail.

Some time passes, and Dewey now owns the station. Vernell visits him and prevails on Dewey to reconcile with Petey. They play pool together, and finally express their love and admiration for one another. Petey soon dies, and Dewey gives a fond eulogy in front of a large crowd of Petey’s fans.

== Cast ==
- Don Cheadle as Ralph "Petey" Greene
- Chiwetel Ejiofor as Dewey Hughes
- Cedric the Entertainer as "Nighthawk" Bob Terry
- Taraji P. Henson as Vernell Watson
- Mike Epps as Milo Hughes
- Vondie Curtis Hall as Sunny Jim Kelsey
- Martin Sheen as E.G. Sonderling
- Peter MacNeill as Warden Cecil Smithers
- Alison Sealy-Smith as Freda
- Richard Chevolleau as Poochie Braxton
- Elle Downs as Peaches
- Herbert L. Rawlings, Jr. as James Brown
- Damir Andrei as Frederick de Cordova
- Jim Malmberg as Johnny Carson

== Reception ==
=== Release ===
Talk to Me had its world premiere as the opening night film of the Los Angeles Film Festival on June 22, 2007. It opened in theaters on July 13, 2007 and made $400,000 in its opening weekend.

=== Critical response ===
On Rotten Tomatoes, review aggregator, the film has an approval rating of 82% based on 126 reviews and an average score of 6.95/10. The website's critical consensus reads, "A riveting look at the life of legendary DJ 'Petey' Greene, Talk to Me goes beyond the typical biopic with explosive performances from Don Cheadle and Chiwetal Ejiofor." On Metacritic, the film has an average score of 69 out of 100 based on 32 critics, indicating "generally favorable reviews".

Michael Rechtshaffen of the Associated Press wrote in his review: "Again demonstrating why he's one of the most versatile actors around, Don Cheadle gives another prize-worthy performance as Ralph Waldo "Petey" Greene Jr., the irrepressible radio DJ whose keepin'-it-real style made him a trusted voice on the airwaves during the turbulent late '60s and early '70s. [...] Also keeping it real are those rich period touches contributed by production designer Warren Alan Young and costume designer Gersha Phillips, whose fabulous creations for Henson appear to have come directly from the blaxploitation attic."

Greene's surviving family members did not cooperate with the making of the film and criticized it for taking liberties with his portrayal and those around him.

== Awards and nominations ==
- African-American Film Critics
  - Best Director: Kasi Lemmons (Winner)
  - Best Actor: Don Cheadle (Winner)
  - Best Supporting Actor: Chiwetel Ejiofor (Winner)
- Image Awards
  - Outstanding Motion Picture (Nominated)
  - Outstanding Actor in a Motion Picture: Don Cheadle (Nominated)
  - Outstanding Actress in a Motion Picture: Taraji P. Henson (Nominated)
  - Outstanding Director in a Motion Picture: Kasi Lemmons (Winner)
  - Outstanding Supporting Actor in a Motion Picture: Chiwetel Ejiofor (Nominated)
  - Outstanding Writing for a Motion Picture: Michael Genet & Rick Famuyiwa (Winner)
- Independent Spirit Awards
  - Best Male Lead: Don Cheadle (Nominated)
  - Best Supporting Male: Chiwetel Ejiofor (Winner)
- Gotham Awards
  - Best Ensemble (Winner) (shared with Before the Devil Knows You're Dead)
- Satellite Awards
  - Best Actor in a Musical/Comedy: Don Cheadle (Nominated)
  - Best Supporting Actress: Taraji P. Henson (Nominated)

== Home media ==
Talk to Me was released on DVD on October 30, 2007, and September 7, 2010, as a wide screen edition. The film was released on Blu-ray on March 22, 2010.
