= Peacock Records =

- Founded: 1949
- Founder: Don Robey
- Defunct: 1979
- Country of origin: United States
- Location: Houston, Texas, U.S.

Peacock Records was an American record label, founded in 1949 by Don Robey in Houston, Texas, United States.

== History ==
Robey established the record label in 1949 after two years of being blues singer Clarence "Gatemouth" Brown's manager, and Brown not finding commercial success with Aladdin Records. Named after Robey's Houston nightclub, the Bronze Peacock, the record label's roster expanded to include such notable rhythm and blues artists as Marie Adams, James Booker, Clarence "Gatemouth" Brown, Little Richard, Memphis Slim, and former gospel singer Jackie Verdell. In 1953, Big Mama Thornton's "Hound Dog" (later covered by Elvis Presley) was a hit for Peacock. The label also dabbled in jazz, releasing albums by vocalist Betty Carter and saxophonist Sonny Criss.

In 1952, Robey gained control of the Duke Records label of Memphis, Tennessee, and formed Duke-Peacock Records.

Peacock also had a very successful gospel music division, which released music from such notable gospel artists as the Dixie Hummingbirds, the Mighty Clouds of Joy, the Sensational Nightingales, the Five Blind Boys of Mississippi, Reverend Cleophus Robinson, the Gospelaires, the Pilgrim Jubilee Singers, the Loving Sisters, and gospel/jazz group Together (1975), which included saxophonist Felix "Top Cat" Dixon.

At the end of 1963, the label launched the gospel subsidiary label Song Bird Records which featured Inez Andrews. In the later 1960s, Peacock again began to issue secular soul singles by artists such as Jackie Verdell, the Inspirations, Little Frankie Lee, Al 'TNT' Bragg and Bud Harper. This later Peacock label featured a bright multi-colored peacock tail on an otherwise blue label background, and it is these later records which are often sought by Northern soul collectors.

The Duke-Peacock family of labels (which also included Back Beat and Sure Shot) was sold to ABC Dunhill Records of Los Angeles on May 23, 1973, with label founder Don Robey staying with ABC as a consultant until his death in 1975. The label name was changed to ABC/Peacock in 1974.

After ABC was sold to MCA Records in 1979, MCA briefly operated an MCA/Songbird label with new signings including Little Anthony (of Little Anthony and the Imperials) and Dan Peek (formerly of the group America). The previous rosters of both ABC-Peacock and ABC-Songbird were dropped (MCA later reissued several Peacock and Song Bird albums at budget price). MCA briefly revived the Peacock name for a series of CD reissues ("Peacock Gospel Classics") in the late 1990s. Along with the MCA back catalog, the Peacock and Song Bird masters are now controlled by the Geffen Records unit of Universal Music Group.

== See also ==
- List of record labels
