= R. H. Harris =

American musician

Rebert H. Harris (March 23, 1916 – September 3, 2000) was an American gospel artist and lead singer of the Soul Stirrers. He had a pure tenor three-octave voice that he utilized for moans and slurs and leaps into falsetto. He was instrumental in transforming the ensemble jubilee quartet style of the 30s into the lead-focused hard gospel style of the 40s and 50s. He was inducted into the Rock and Roll Hall of Fame in 1989 as a member of the Soul Stirrers; the group was also inducted into the Vocal Group Hall of Fame in 2000. He was the fountainhead of numerous gospel and soul singers, and direct model to Sam Cooke, who replaced him as lead singer of the Soul Stirrers.

== Early life ==
Harris grew up on a farm 13 miles outside Trinity, Texas in the former "Blackland" settlement (named after the darkness of its soil, not the racial constitution of its residents). James and Katie Harris and their nine children (Rebert was their sixth) lived about 300 yards from the barbed wire fence of the Eastham Prison Camp, where convicts would toil in the fields and sing themselves back home with a mixture of spirituals and blues.

== Musical career ==
Rebert says he started arranging his first gospel quartet, with his brother Almo and two cousins, before he even knew what the quartet style was. The group was called the Friendly Four and then the Friendly Gospel Singers when Harris moved to town to start seventh grade at the Trinity Colored High School. After tenth grade, which is as far as the school went, 15-year-old Harris attended Mary Allen College in nearby Crockett and weighed a tempting offer to join (Silas) Roy Crain's (aka "Senior" Crain or S.R. Crain) group the Soul Stirrers, who had moved to Houston. At the time the Soul Stirrers were a jubilee group, singing poppy, up-tempo numbers such as "Down By the Riverside". But as soon as Harris finally committed (Rebert says the year was 1931; gospel historians usually put the year at '35 or '36), he helped change the group's sound to a slower, deeper, more passionate hard gospel style.

Harris claimed to have no musical influences besides ones he found in the trees and fields of his family's farm outside Trinity.

In the late 1940s, Harris helped to create the National Quartet Convention to help "professionalize" the African-American gospel music community.
