= Charlotta Gordon Pyles =

African American abolitionist

Charlotta Gordon Pyles (c. 1790~1806-1880) was an African American abolitionist and lecturer. She raised money needed to purchase the freedom of some of her family members by embarking on an anit-slavery lecture tour. Pyles helped runaway slaves on their journey to Canada and was a suffragist.

== Early life ==
Born in Tennessee, Pyles was born into slavery and lived on Hugh Gordon's plantation near Bardstown, Kentucky along with her children. After Gordon's death, his daughter Frances Gordon inherited the Pyles family and moved from Kentucky to Iowa, where she freed Charlotta and some, but not all, of her family.

Due to birth records of slaves being rarely kept there are conflicting reports of Pyles's birthdate. Some sources say she was born in April 1790 while others say she was born in 1804 or 1806. According to some accounts, Pyles' mother was Seminole and her father was enslaved. She grew up on Hugh Gordon's plantation in Bardstown, Kentucky, and Gordon's daughter Frances inherited Charlotta and her family when Hugh Gordon died. Frances Gordon planned to free the Pyles family from slavery because her Wesleyan Methodist faith advocated for manumission. Despite Frances Gordon's wishes, her brothers opposed manumission and twice contested their father's will in 1853 and 1854, claiming that Frances was incompetent as she was 80 years old and slightly crippled. Frances Gordon defended herself in court against her siblings and Judge Col. W.H. Hays and the jury sided win her favor. Frances took the Pyles family to the north seeking freedom except for Charlotta's son Benjamin who was kidnapped and sold. The Pyles eventually settled in Keokuk, Iowa.

== Lecturing and activist career ==
Along with Charlotta's son, Benjamin, two of Charlotta's sons-in-law remained in slavery after her manumission. Pyles decided to buy their freedom, but to do so, she would have to raise $1500 each for a total of $3,000. To do this, Pyle gave public lectures in cities like Philadelphia and New York. Despite having no formal education, her public speaking was very popular and she was able to raise the money within 6 months and buy the freedom of her sons-in-law. On her lecture tour, she caught the attention of fellow abolitionist Fredrick Douglas along with women's suffrage activist Susan B. Anthony. Douglas even wrote a poem about Pyles in his Fredrick Douglas Paper on December 14, 1855. After her lectures, Pyles continued to fight against slavery as her home in Keokuk became a haven for runaway slaves on their escape to Canada. Pyles also contributed to the women's suffrage movement before she died on January 19, 1880. She is buried in Keokuk, Iowa.
