= Helen Jones Woods =

American jazz musician (1923–2020)

- Born: October 9 or November 14, 1923; Meridian, Mississippi, U.S.
- Died: July 25, 2020 (aged 96) Sarasota, Florida, U.S.
- Genres: Jazz, swing
- Occupation: Musician
- Instrument: Trombone

Helen Elizabeth Jones Woods (October 9 or November 14, 1923 – July 25, 2020) was an American jazz and swing trombone player renowned for her performances with the International Sweethearts of Rhythm. She was inducted into the Omaha Black Music Hall of Fame in 2007.

== Early life ==
Helen Elizabeth Jones was born on October 9 or November 14, 1923. She spent a brief period in an orphanage for white children in Meridian, Mississippi before being adopted by Dr. Laurence and Grace Jones. They were the founders of the Piney Woods Country Life School, a Black boarding school with a strong musical presence.

== Career ==
In her 1940s heyday, young Helen Elizabeth Jones was in the top female jazz band in the United States. From an early age, Woods was fascinated by the slide motion of the trombone. She started playing with the group when she was only 11 years old, when it was still the "school band" of Piney Woods Country Life School in Mississippi. Helen was one of six surviving members of the band interviewed in the 1986 documentary film International Sweethearts of Rhythm.

After the band dissolved in 1949, Jones moved to Omaha where she briefly played in the Omaha Symphony Orchestra before being fired when the orchestra realized she was not white. After that she worked as a licensed practical nurse at Douglas County Hospital. Jones Woods and her husband, William Alfred Woods, lived in the Logan Fontenelle Housing Projects while he attended Creighton University. Upon graduating, he became the first African-American to earn an accounting degree there.

== Personal life and death ==
Woods was Catholic and a regular attendee at St Benedict the Moor in Omaha. Her fourth child is Cathy Hughes, a business entrepreneur from Omaha.

She died from COVID-19 on July 25, 2020, at a hospital in Sarasota, Florida.

== See also ==
- Music in Omaha
- Culture in North Omaha, Nebraska
