= Mississippi State Federation of Colored Women's Clubs =

- Formation: 1903
- Founded at: Mississippi
- Type: Woman's club
- Website: msfcwcinc.org

The Mississippi State Federation of Colored Women's Clubs, Inc (MSFCWC) is an African American woman's club located in Mississippi. The umbrella organization, affiliated with the National Association of Colored Women (NACW) was founded in 1903. The headquarters of the club are located in Jackson. The organization had an annual convention and was organized into committees. MSFCWC sponsored scholarship opportunities, and provided resources for black people in Mississippi.

== History ==
Educators, Ursula J. Wade Foster, Mattie F. Rowan and Lizzie Coleman created the club in 1903. They had been inspired by visiting the annual session of the Southeastern Association of Colored Women's Clubs which was held in Vicksburg in 1901. By 1906, the annual convention was expected to draw 200 delegates from women's clubs in Mississippi. There was a period of around 6 years prior to 1920 when no annual convention was held, however.

A new clubhouse for the organization was dedicated in Clinton, a town outside of Jackson, in 1953.
