= Blind Joe Taggart =

American singer and guitarist (1892–1961)

- Born: Joel Washington Taggart; August 16, 1892; Abbeville, South Carolina, U.S.
- Died: January 15, 1961 (aged 68) Chicago, Illinois, U.S.
- Genres: Country blues, gospel music
- Occupations: Singer, guitarist
- Instrument: Guitar

Joel Washington Taggart (August 16, 1892 – January 15, 1961), usually known as Blind Joe Taggart, was an American country blues and gospel singer and guitarist who recorded in the 1920s and 1930s. Though primarily a performer of evangelistic gospel songs, he also recorded secular music under a number of pseudonyms including Blind Joe Amos, Blind Jeremiah Taylor, Blind Tim Russell, Blind Joe Donnel, and possibly Blind Percy and Six Cylinder Smith.

== Early life ==
Taggart was born in Abbeville, South Carolina, and by 1910 attended South Carolina Institute for the Deaf, Dumb and Blind in Spartanburg. By 1917, he was living and working as a musician in Atlanta, Georgia. He married and moved to Chicago before 1921.

== Career ==
He made his first recordings in 1926, for the Vocalion label. These were among the first recordings to be made of a so-called "guitar evangelist". His recordings of religious songs under the name Blind Joe Taggart included "The Storm Is Passing Over", "I Will Not Be Removed", "Take Your Burden to the Lord", and "I Wish My Mother Was On That Train". As well as recording solo, he recorded duets with his wife Emma, and also recorded with James Taggart, presumed to be his son. Some of his recordings have been cited as having "traces of some of the earliest [blues] musical styles to have ever been recorded".

As an itinerant blues performer, he was helped to and around venues by the young Josh White. According to White, Taggart was "tricky, nasty, mean", and something of a fraud because he had partial vision rather than being completely blind. Records suggest that he wore one artificial eye, but had some sight in his other eye. According to record collector John Tefteller: "The labels knew they could sell more records by putting the word 'Blind' before the artist's name... Black people were considered inferior. It was awful. They were being recorded, almost exclusively, by white producers. I don't know if these singers really wanted to call themselves 'Blind' or not. Probably not."

Taggart recorded secular blues songs under several pseudonyms, for different labels, including Paramount and Decca. The question of whether he was the performer credited as "Six Cylinder Smith" is unresolved. Eugene Chadbourne has commented: "When a bluesman assumed another name, the reason was not some kind of schizophrenia, but usually an effort to do extra recording outside of a contract that had already been signed under one name. In the case of Taggart, he may have recorded secular blues numbers under the name of Smith, because in his former performing identity he was known as a gospel blues singer in the style of Blind Willie Johnson."

Taggart's last commercial recordings were issued in 1934. He remarried in Chicago in 1943, and made a religious test recording for the Presto label in 1948.

== Death ==
He died of uremia in Presbyterian-St Luke's Hospital, Chicago, in 1961, at the age of 68.

== Legacy ==
At least one photograph is believed to exist of Taggart. All his known recordings have been reissued on CD by Document Records. Blind Joe Taggart has been mentioned in several online blogs as the originator of "Satan Your Kingdom Must Come Down", the theme song for the 2011/12 television series, Boss, sung by Robert Plant of the British group Led Zeppelin.
