= James Phelps (musician) =

American singer (1932–2010)

- Born: April 2, 1932; Shreveport Louisiana
- Died: October 26, 2010 (aged 78); New York City
- Occupations: American R&B and gospel singer
- Known for: Love Is a Five-Letter Word

James Phelps (born April 2, 1932, Shreveport, Louisiana – died October 26, 2010, New York City) was an American R&B and gospel singer.

Phelps moved to Chicago in his teens and sang in several gospel groups, such as the Gospel Songbirds, the Holy Wonders (beside Lou Rawls) and the Soul Stirrers (with Sam Cooke). He founded the Clefs of Cavalry in the 1950s before starting a solo career in the 1960s.

He managed a hit single, "Love Is a Five-Letter Word", on Argo Records in 1965, which reached #12 on the Billboard R&B chart and #66 on the Billboard Hot 100. Phelps ceased recording by the 1970s but remained active as a performer of both R&B and gospel music.
