= Michael Genet =

American actor and screenwriter (born 1958)

- Born: August 25, 1958 (age 67); Washington, U.S.
- Education: Juilliard School (BFA)
- Occupation(s): Actor, screenwriter
- Years active: 1988–present

Michael Genet (born August 25, 1958) is an American actor and screenwriter. He has guest starred in a number of television series based in the New York City area, they include The Equalizer, New York Undercover, Law & Order, Law & Order: Criminal Intent, Law & Order: Special Victims Unit, Ugly Betty and the soap operas As the World Turns, One Life to Live.

As a screenwriter, Genet wrote the film She Hate Me (2004), directed by Spike Lee, co-writing the film with Lee. Genet also appeared in the film playing the older brother of the film's protagonist, played by Anthony Mackie. Prior to this, he appeared in Lee's 2002 film 25th Hour. The next film he wrote Talk to Me (2007), was directed by Kasi Lemmons, co-writing the film with Rick Famuyiwa.

Genet has also appeared in a number of Broadway stage productions.

== Filmography ==
=== Film ===
Michael Genet film credits
Year	Title	Role	Notes
1989	Simple Justice	Mitchell Jackson	
1990	Presumed Innocent	Court Clerk	
1995	Let It Be Me	Panhandler	
1996	One Fine Day	Press Secretary	
2002	25th Hour	Agent Cunningham	
2004	She Hate Me	Jamal Armstrong	
2010	Dream Street		
2010	Wall Street: Money Never Sleeps	James' Butler	

=== Television ===
Michael Genet television credits
Year	Title	Role	Notes
1988	The Equalizer	Ben	Episode: "Day of the Covenant"
1990–1995	As the World Turns	Lamar Griffin	7 episodes
1992	Law & Order	Johnson	Episode: "Conspiracy"
1996	Law & Order	Henry Davis	Episode: "Homesick"
1997	New York Undercover	Earl	1 episode
2002	Law & Order	Bill Danberg	Episode: "Open Season"
2003	Law & Order: Criminal Intent	Feingold	Episode: "Monster"
2003	Law & Order: Criminal Intent	Brent's Attorney	Episode: "Gemini"
2006	Law & Order	Warren Shenkler	Episode: "Fear America"
2008	Law & Order	Franklin Slater	Episode: "Political Animal"
2010	Ugly Betty	Dr. Thompson	1 episode
2010	Law & Order: Criminal Intent	Mulla	Episode: "Loyalty: Part 1"
2010	One Life to Live	Warden	4 episodes
2011	Law & Order: Special Victims Unit	Lt. Harrison	Episode: "Smoked"
2013	The Americans	Reverend	Episode: "The Oath"
2018	Blue Bloods	Judge Alexander	Episode: "Risk Management"
