= Swan Silvertones =

American gospel music group

The Swan Silvertones
- Genres: Gospel, Christian

The Swan Silvertones are an American gospel music group that first achieved popularity in the 1940s and 1950s under the leadership of Claude Jeter. Jeter formed the group in 1938 as the "Four Harmony Kings" while he was working as a coal miner in West Virginia, United States. After moving to Knoxville, Tennessee and obtaining their own radio show, the group changed its name to the Silvertone Singers in order to avoid confusion with another ensemble known as the "Four Kings of Harmony." They added the name Swan shortly thereafter, since Swan Bakeries sponsored their show. Their wide exposure through radio brought them a contract in 1946 with King Records.

== Career ==
At this early stage, the Silvertones already embodied an amalgam of two styles: the close barbershop harmony that they had featured when starting out in West Virginia, and virtuoso leads supplied by Jeter and Solomon Womack. The group later lost Womack, but added Paul Owens in 1952 and Louis Johnson in 1955. Claude Jeter performed as lead singer on "Mary Don't You Weep".

The group recorded for Specialty Records from 1951 to 1955, when it switched to Vee-Jay Records. They recorded one album with HOB Records after Vee-Jay shut down in 1965, at which point Jeter left the group for the ministry. They recorded an additional 11 albums with HOB Records and one LP on Peacock Records in 1973 before signing with Savoy Records and recording seven more albums. In 2009, a revamped line-up released the compact disc Need More Love through CD Baby.

When interviewed by Dick Cavett in April 1970, Paul Simon credited the group with inspiring him to write the song "Bridge Over Troubled Water", specifically Jeter's line in one song: "I'll be a bridge over deep water if you trust in my name" — with Simon confessing: "I guess I stole it". John Fogerty's goal for the line, "Rollin', rollin', rollin' on the river," in the song "Proud Mary" was to evoke male gospel harmonies, as exemplified by groups such as the Swan Silvertones, the Sensational Nightingales, and the Five Blind Boys of Mississippi.

The Swan Silvertones were inducted into the Vocal Group Hall of Fame in 2002.

In January 2011, the Swan Silvertones were nominated for the 10th Annual Independent Music Awards in the Gospel category for Need More Love.

== Suggested reading ==
- Zolten, Jerry, Great God A' Mighty!:The Dixie Hummingbirds – Celebrating The Rise Of Soul Gospel Music, Oxford University Press, 2003, ISBN 0-19-515272-7.

== See also ==
- Five Blind Boys of Alabama
