= Piney Woods Country Life School =

Location
- Piney Woods, MS; USA; 32.0623401°N 89.9948113°W -->

Information
- Type: Private, boarding
- Motto: Head, Heart, & Hands
- Religious affiliation: Christian
- Established: 1909
- President: William Crossley
- Enrollment: Approximately 250
- Campus: Township
- Campus size: 2,000 acres (810 ha)
- Website: pineywoods.org

U.S. National Register of Historic Places
- Official name: Piney Woods Country Life School Historic District
- Designated: September 24, 2020

The Piney Woods Country Life School (or The Piney Woods School) is a co-educational independent historically African-American boarding school for grades 9–12 in Piney Woods, unincorporated Rankin County, Mississippi, 21 miles (34 km) south of Jackson. It is one of four remaining historically African-American boarding schools in the United States. It is the largest African-American boarding school, as well as being the second oldest continually operating African-American boarding school. Its campus was listed on the National Register of Historic Places in 2020.

== History ==
The Piney Woods School was founded in 1909 by Laurence C. Jones. Jones added the Mississippi School of the Blind for Negroes in the early 1920s, and in 1929, with the arrival of Martha Louise Morrow Foxx serving as principal, the Mississippi Blind School for Negroes was founded at Piney Woods. The school eventually moved to an urban location in Jackson, Mississippi.

Piney Woods was where the International Sweethearts of Rhythm were formed, by Jones, in 1937. The band included jazz musician Helen Jones, the daughter of the school's founder.

Other bands associated with the school included the Five Blind Boys of Mississippi and the Cotton Blossom Singers. Beginning in the 1930s the school also sponsored baseball teams as part of the fund-raising efforts.

The school was presided over for more than 60 years by Jones, until 1974 when Dr. James S. Wade became the second president. Charles Beady led the school for more than 20 years, and today the school is presided over by Dr. Reginald T.W. Nichols.

In 1954 Jones appeared on the This Is Your Life television show. During the show the host asked viewers to each send in $1 to support the school, eventually raising $700,000, with which Jones began the schools' endowment fund, reported to be at $7,000,000 when Jones died in 1975.

Since then the school has conducted a number of notable publicity and fundraising activities. A variety of speakers have spoken at the school, including George Washington Carver, LeRoy T. Walker and Mike Espy. Wynton Marsalis played a benefit performance for the school in 1994, as well. Morley Safer reported on the school in 1992 and again in 2005 for the CBS television show, 60 Minutes.

== Studies and campus ==
The curriculum at Piney Woods combines strict discipline, Christian teaching and chores with classroom instruction. More than 98 percent of Piney Woods' graduates go on to attend colleges, including Kings College (Pennsylvania), Emory University, University of Mississippi, Mississippi State University, Millsaps College, Clark Atlanta University, Spelman College, Morehouse College, Xavier University, Rice University, Jackson State University, Tougaloo College, Berea College, Howard University, Xavier University of Louisiana, Princeton University, the University of Chicago, University of Memphis, University of the South, Smith College, Harvard University, Vassar College, Tufts University, University of California at Los Angeles, University of Maryland, Florida A&M University, Texas Southern University, and Amherst College .

The Piney Woods campus is located 21 miles (34 km) southeast of Jackson, Mississippi. It sits on 2,000 acres (810 ha) of rolling hills, forest, open fields and lakes. Funded by donations and a significant endowment, the school houses 300 high school students in grades 9 through 12 from more than 20 states, Mexico, the Caribbean and several African nations. The self-sufficient campus includes a post office, a farm, athletic fields, chapel and amphitheater.

== Notable alumni and faculty ==
- Helen Jones Woods
- Grace Morris Allen Jones, wife of Laurence and pioneering African American educator
- Cotton Blossom Singers
- Five Blind Boys of Mississippi
- International Sweethearts of Rhythm
- Virgia Brocks-Shedd, librarian and poet
- Yvonne Busch, noted music educator
- M. F. K. Fisher, preeminent American food writer
