= Five Blind Boys of Mississippi =

American gospel quartet (1936–1994)

- Publicity photo of the Five Blind Boys of Mississippi, issued by Peacock Records in the 1950s.

Background information
- Also known as: Cotton Blossom Singers
- Origin: Jackson, Mississippi, United States
- Genre: Gospel
- Years active: 1936–1999
- Label: Peacock Records
- Past members: Archie Brownlee – Lead vocals (1936–1960); Lawrence Abrams – Tenor (1936–1982); Lloyd Woodard – Baritone (1936–1973); Joseph Ford – Bass vocals (1936–1948; Melvin Henderson – Vocals (Early 1940s); Rev. Percell Perkins – Vocals, Manager (Mid-1940s–1960); J.T. Clinkscales – Bass vocals (1948–1990s; replaced Joseph Ford); Henry Johnson – Lead vocals (Late 1940s/Early 1950s); Willie Mincey – Vocals (1960s; replaced Broadnax); Jimmy Carter – Vocals (Joined c. 1964–1979; a co-founding member of the Blind Boys of Alabama who crossed over to sing with Mississippi for 13 years)

The Five Blind Boys of Mississippi, 1962

The Five Blind Boys of Mississippi, originally organized as the Cotton Blossom Singers, were an American post-war gospel quartet whose prominent members included pioneering lead vocalists Archie Brownlee and Henry "Big Henry" Johnson. Formed in 1936 by visually impaired students at the Piney Woods School, the group's name eventually became a misnomer as multiple key members throughout their history, most notably long-time manager and vocalist Rev. Percell Perkins and later lead singer Sandy Foster, were fully sighted. The ensemble achieved national stardom and foundational historical significance in early 1951 when their bluesy, Brownlee-led rendition of "Our Father" reached number 10 on the Billboard R&B charts, making it one of the first gospel recordings in history to successfully cross over into the mainstream secular charts. Their distinctive vocal style left a deep impression on popular culture, directly inspiring rock musicians like John Fogerty, who explicitly intended to evoke the male gospel harmonies of the Five Blind Boys of Mississippi, the Swan Silvertones, and The Sensational Nightingales with his vocal delivery on the Creedence Clearwater Revival track "Proud Mary".

== History ==
The group originated under the direction of teacher Martha Louise Morrow Foxx, who organized the blind students at the request of school founder Laurence C. Jones to perform both jubilee quartet and secular material for fundraising tours. The original core lineup consisted of Brownlee, Joseph Ford, Lawrence Abrams, and Lloyd Woodard. On March 9, 1937, the group recorded sacred music as the Blind Boys, along with three secular selections, for Library of Congress researcher Alan Lomax. Following their graduation in the early 1940s, they began touring professionally, using the name the Cotton Blossom Singers for secular pop repertoire and performing religious material as the Jackson Harmoneers, frequently backed by the all-female jazz ensemble the International Sweethearts of Rhythm.

The addition of Melvin Henderson in the early 1940s expanded the quartet into a quintet. Upon relocating to Chicago in the mid-1940s, the group officially adopted the name the Five Blind Boys of Mississippi. Under the direct stylistic influence of R.H. Harris of the Soul Stirrers, Brownlee transitioned the ensemble away from older jubilee traditions toward a more intense, modern hard gospel framework. Brownlee's dynamic vocal delivery, marked by a fluid transition from sweet crooning to devastating falsetto screams, became a major blueprint for early soul and rhythm and blues artists, including Ray Charles, James Brown, and Wilson Pickett.

The group entered its era of peak commercial success after signing with Don Robey’s Houston-based Peacock Records in 1950 and recruiting the hard gospel shouter Rev. Percell Perkins to replace Henderson. Perkins, who was not blind, assumed the role of business manager. Concurrently, bass singer Joseph Ford was replaced by J.T. Clinkscales, solidifying the lineup that recorded the massive commercial hit "Our Father," which went on to sell over 500,000 copies. Over the next decade, the group dominated the national gospel circuit with hits such as "Old Ship Of Zion", "In the Wilderness", and "Let's Have Church". This golden era came to an end when Brownlee died of pneumonia while touring in New Orleans on February 8, 1960, at the age of 34, prompting Perkins to depart shortly after for the ministry.

Brownlee was initially replaced by Roscoe Robinson, and subsequently by Henry "Big Henry" Johnson, whose booming vocal delivery and piercing shouts successfully sustained the group's signature sonic intensity. High-tenor vocalist Willmer "Little Ax" Broadnax joined as second lead before being replaced by Willie Mincey, while touring lineups throughout the 1960s intermittently featured Rev. Sammy Lewis, Rev. George Warren, James Watts, and Vance Powell. By the close of the decade, the ensemble had produced 27 singles and multiple albums for Peacock Records.

During the 1970s and 1980s, the group recorded material for Jewel Records and maintained a consistent touring schedule, yet their long-term mainstream visibility diverged significantly from their contemporary rivals, the Blind Boys of Alabama.While the Mississippi group initially commanded greater commercial success, they suffered severe structural instability due to the recurring loss of foundational members. Original baritone Lloyd Woodard died in 1973, tenor Lawrence Abrams passed away in 1982, and lead vocalist Henry "Big Henry" Johnson died in 1999, resulting in a highly rotational lineup that diluted brand continuity. Furthermore, the Mississippi group elected to remain strictly isolated within traditional African-American church and gospel quartet circuits. In contrast, the Blind Boys of Alabama maintained a remarkably stable core roster under Clarence Fountain and Jimmy Carter, actively diversifying their audience by crossing over into mainstream pop culture through theater productions, secular music collaborations, and Grammy-winning contemporary root albums.

The Five Blind Boys of Mississippi continued touring within their traditional network until quietly retiring the moniker and disbanding around 1994. A historical point of contention remains regarding the naming of both groups; while some sources indicate the Mississippi ensemble took their name when Percell Perkins joined in the mid-1940s, Fountain maintained that both groups were christened simultaneously by organizers during a 1948 quartet contest in Newark, New Jersey.

== See also ==
- List of musicians from Mississippi
