= The Soul Stirrers =

American gospel music group

- Origin: Trinity, Texas, United States
- Genres: Gospel
- Years active: 1926–present
- Labels: Specialty; Ruff Moore Media
- Members: Jeffery Moore; Jackie Lee Heard; Justin Morris Jr. Willie Rogers; Ben Odom; Gene Stewart; Michael Grady Jr.
- Past members: Sam Cooke; R.H. Harris; Johnnie Taylor; Julius Cheeks; Paul Foster; James Phelps; Jesse J. Farley; Jimmy Outler; John Rawls; Thomas Breuster; Jackie Banks; Roy Crain; Bob King; Arthur Crume; Leroy Crume; Dillard Crume; Rufus Crume; James Davis; James Hardy; Frank Davis; Calvin Henderson; Luther Gamble; Eddie Huffman; Justin Morris; Earnest Smith; Jackie Heard; Jeffery Moore; Glenn Darden; Gary Blackshear; Sonny Mitchell; Richard Gibbs Sr. Martin Jacox
- Website: www.thesoulstirrers.com

The Soul Stirrers are an American gospel music group, whose career spans over 100 years. The group was a pioneer in the development of the quartet style of gospel, and a major influence on soul, R&B, doo-wop, and Southern soul, some of the secular music that owed much to gospel.

== Biography ==
=== Formation ===
The group was formed by (Silas) Roy Crain, launching his first quartet who sang in a jubilee style, in 1926 in Trinity, Texas, United States. In the early 1930s, after Crain moved to Houston, he joined an existing group on the condition that it change its name to The Soul Stirrers: this name yields from the description of one of Roy Crain's earlier quartets as "soul-stirring". Among the members of that group there was R.H. (Rebert) Harris, who soon became its musical leader. The Soul Stirrers, formed as a jubilee quartet, transformed their sound, influenced by hard gospel singers such as Mahalia Jackson and Sister Rosetta Tharpe.

=== Style ===
Rebert Harris, also from Trinity, Texas, brought several changes to The Soul Stirrers that affected gospel quartet singing generally. He used a falsetto style that had its antecedents in African music, but which was new to the popular jubilee singing style of the time. He pioneered the "swing lead", in which two singers would share the job of leading the song, allowing virtuoso singers to increase the emotional intensity of the song as the lead passed between them without disturbing the four part harmony. That innovation led The Soul Stirrers, while still called a quartet, to acquire five members.

The Soul Stirrers made other important changes in those years: ad-libbing lyrics, singing in delayed time, and repeating words in the background as both a rhythmic and emotional support for the lead singers. The Soul Stirrers along with other quartet performers, dropped the "flatfooted" style of jubilee quartets before them and expanded their repertoire from spirituals and traditional hymns to the newer gospel compositions. The group also loosened the rigid arrangements that jubilee quartets had favored to permit individual singers within the group more space for individual development. A reunion of the Soul Stirrers revival was formed in 2024 with former members current leader and 15-year veteran Jeffery Moore along with other former members, Jackie Lee Heard and Justin Morris, Jr.The Current group has completed a Gospel Royalty Tour and Centennial Tour

=== Recordings and performances ===
In 1936, Alan Lomax recorded The Soul Stirrers for the Library of Congress's American music project, and those four unissued recordings are in the American Folklife Center collection today. They later moved to Chicago, where they broadcast a weekly radio show (WIND) with other famous groups including The Golden Gate Quartet and The Famous Blue Jay Singers. As the gospel quartet style of singing became more popular, groups would perform in competitions called "song battles" to further increase the genre's popularity. In 2025, Jeffery Moore recorded Jesus Be A Fence Volume 1

As World War II began, it became more difficult for many gospel quartet groups to make a living. It resulted in some quartets supplementing their income by doing live performances at churches, schools, and neighborhood centers. Despite the economic situation, throughout the 1940s and leading into the 1950s, many gospel quartet groups were able to pursue their careers successfully. The Soul Stirrers' nationwide touring gained them an even larger audience.

The Soul Stirrers signed with Specialty Records, where they recorded a number of tracks, including "By and By" and "In That Awful Hour". Harris quit in late 1950 to form a new group, citing dissatisfaction with what he viewed as the crookedness of the business and immoral behavior by musicians he saw on the "Gospel Highway" touring circuit. He was briefly replaced on lead by Paul Foster, then by Sam Cooke. Cooke joined the group at 19 and served as lead vocalist from 1950 to 1956.

One of the early singles with Cooke was "Jesus Gave Me Water", a major hit that brought The Soul Stirrers acclaim. Thomas L. Breuster was replaced by Bob King and, briefly, Julius Cheeks. When Cooke left in 1957 to pursue a solo career in pop music, The Soul Stirrers' preeminence in gospel was essentially over, though a brief period of success with Johnnie Taylor sustained the group for a time. The group made several appearances performing on TV Gospel Time in early 1960s. Various line-ups continued touring and recording throughout the last half of the century to a small and devoted following.

=== Awards ===
The group and its members Roy Crain Sr., R. H. Harris, Jesse Farley, and E. A. Rundless were inducted into the Rock and Roll Hall of Fame in 1989 as one of rock's Early Influences. The group was inducted into the Vocal Group Hall of Fame in 2000. In 2022 their 1950 recording "Jesus Gave Me Water" was selected by the US Library of Congress for preservation in the National Recording Registry. Current leader of the group 2026 Jeffery Moore and its members, Jackie Lee Heard and Justin Morris, Jr. joined the grand daughter of Sam Cooke, Nicole Cooke Johnson and her son on stage to accept Grammy Hall of Fame induction 1951 recording Jesus Gave Me Water May 8, 2026.
