= Sensational Nightingales =

American gospel quartet

The Sensational Nightingales
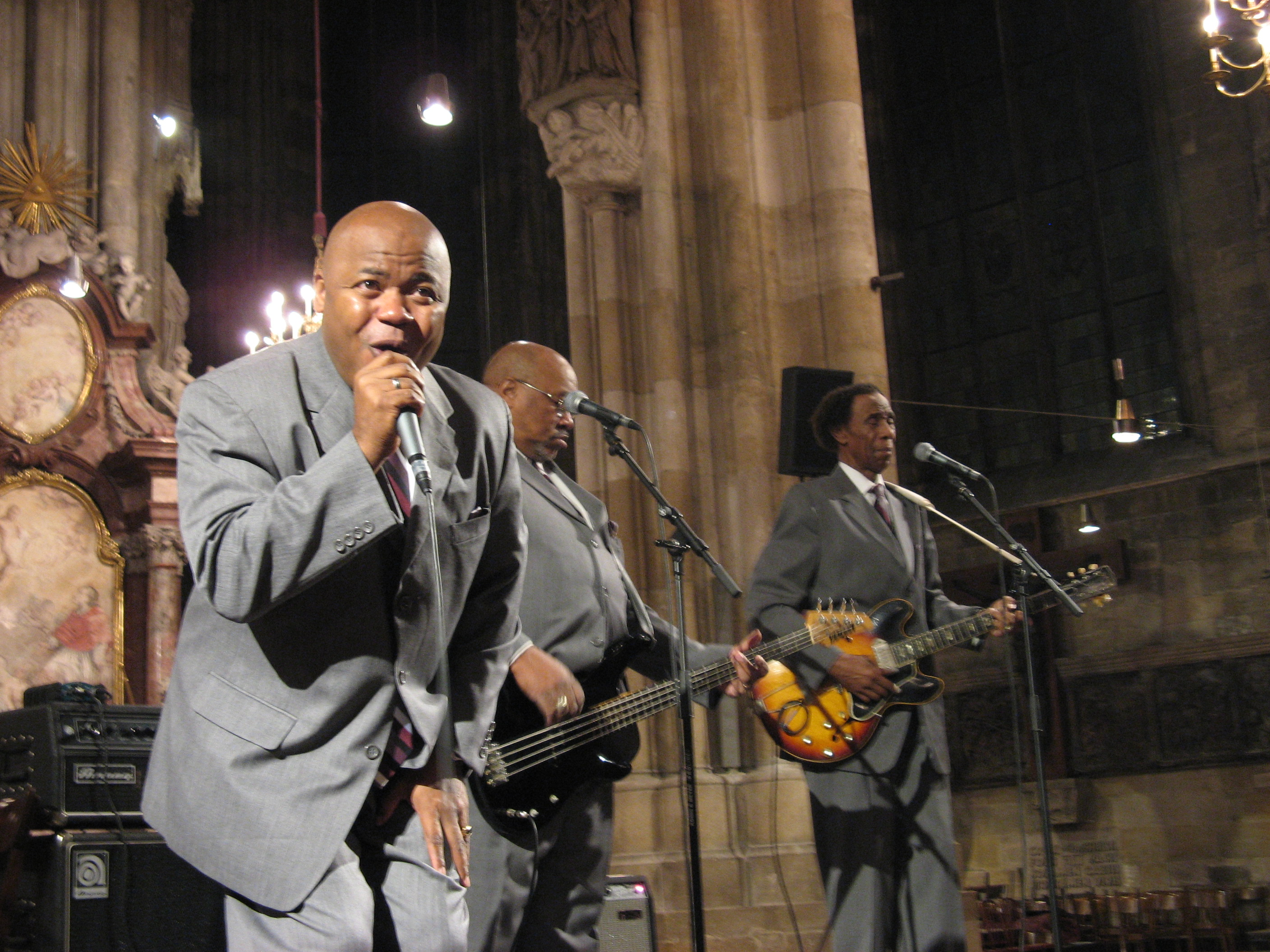
- Performing in November, 2006

Background information
- Also known as: The Nightingales
- Genres: Gospel, traditional black gospel, Southern gospel
- Years active: 1942–present
- Past members: Julius Cheeks; Charles Johnson; Otis Clay; Barney Parks; Ernest James; Carl Coates; Calvert McNair; Howard Carroll; Paul Owens; Willie George "Bill" Woodruff

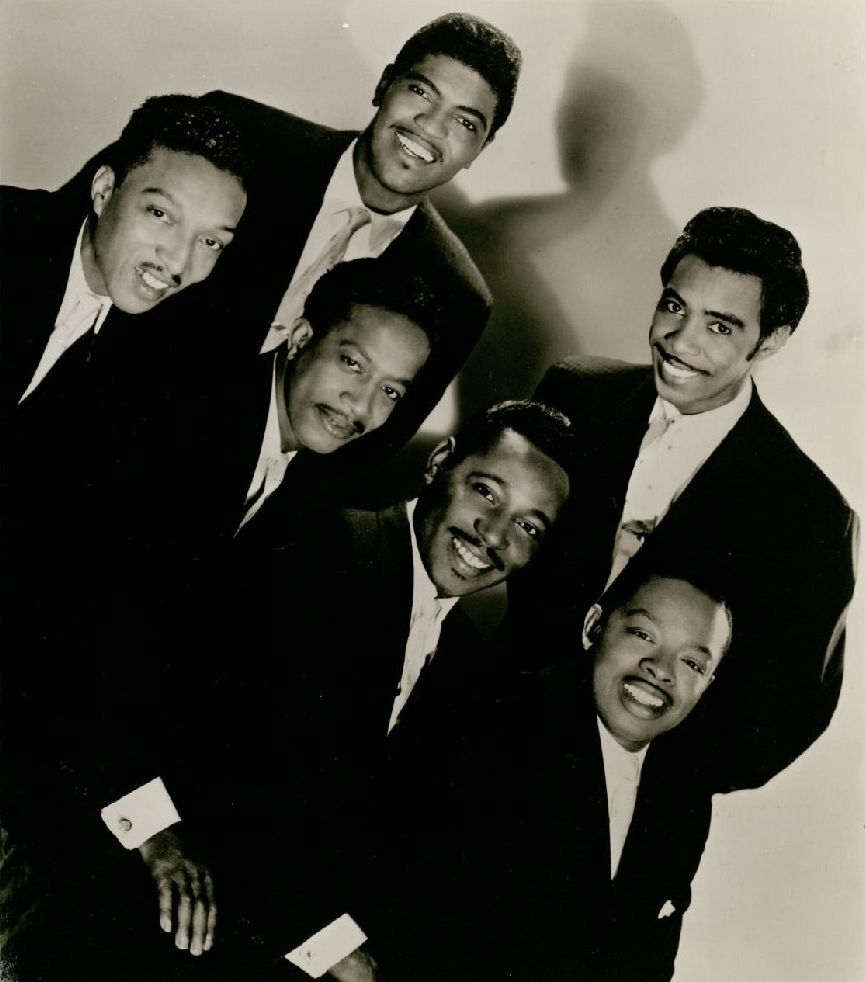
The Sensational Nightingales publicity photo for Peacock Records

The Sensational Nightingales are a traditional black gospel quartet that reached its peak of popularity in the 1950s, when it featured Julius Cheeks as its lead singer. The Nightingales, with several changes of membership, continue to tour and record.

John Fogerty's goal for the line, "rollin', rollin', rollin' on the river", in the song "Proud Mary" was to evoke male gospel harmonies, as exemplified by groups such as the Swan Silvertones, the Sensational Nightingales, and the Five Blind Boys of Mississippi.

== Musical career ==
The group was founded in 1942 by Barney Parks, who had formerly sung with the Dixie Hummingbirds. Julius "June" Cheeks joined the group in 1946. Cheeks left and returned to the group several times during its heyday, then left in 1960 to form his own group, "the Sensational Knights", Charles Johnson becoming the new lead singer. In 1984, Charles Johnson was replaced by Calvert McNair.

The group presently consists of Joseph "JoJo" Wallace, Larry Moore, Horace "Sug" Thompson, and guitarist Darrell Luster.

Horace "Sug" Thompson is the grandfather of R&B singer PatriceLIVE.

== Discography ==
- Songs of Praise (Peacock 101, 1959)
- Glory Glory (Peacock 112, 1963)
- Travel On (Peacock 118, 1964)
- Prayed Too Late (Peacock 131, 1965)
- Heart and Soul (Peacock 154, 1968)
- It's Gonna Rain Again (Peacock 175, 1972)
- You and I and Everyone (Peacock 177, 1973)
- You Know Not the Hour (Peacock 197, 1974)
- My Sisters and Brothers (Peacock 59209, 1974)
- The Almighty Hand (Peacock 59219, 1975)
- See You in the Rapture (Peacock 59227, 1976)
- Jesus Is Coming (Peacock 59232, 1978)
- All About Jesus (Malaco 4368, 1980)
- Saints Hold On (Malaco 4373, 1981)
- Hymns (Malaco 4378, 1982)
- He Is Real (Malaco 4380, 1982)
- I Surrender All (Malaco 4391, 1984)
- Church Let's Get Ready For The Resurrection! (Malaco 4401, 1985)
- Freedom After a While (Malaco 4411, 1987)
- Victory Is Mine (Malaco 4427, 1988)
- The Truth Shall Make You Free (1989)
- A Message from the Book (1991)
- Stay On The Boat! (1992)
- Don't Give Up! (1998)

Compilations

- Wasted Years, 2001
