= Piney Woods, Mississippi =

Unincorporated community in Mississippi, US

- Unincorporated community
- Location within Mississippi Location within the United States
- Coordinates: 32°03′46″N 89°59′34″W
- Country: United States
- State: Mississippi
- County: Rankin
- Elevation: 486 ft (148 m)
- Time zone: UTC-6 (Central (CST))
  - Summer (DST): UTC-5 (CDT)
- ZIP codes: 39148
- Area codes: 601 & 769
- GNIS feature ID: 675910

Piney Woods is an unincorporated community in Rankin County, Mississippi, United States. It is the site of the Piney Woods Country Life School, a historically African-American boarding school established in 1909. The school's historic district became part of the African American Civil Rights Network in 2023.

The community is part of the Jackson Metropolitan Statistical Area.

A post office began operating under the name Piney Woods in 1926.
