= Julius Cheeks =

American gospel singer

Julius "June" Cheeks
- Born: August 7, 1929
- Origin: Spartanburg, South Carolina
- Died: January 27, 1981 (aged 51)
- Genres: Gospel music

Rev. Julius "June" Cheeks (August 7, 1929 – January 27, 1981) was an American gospel singer, who enjoyed the majority of his success with The Sensational Nightingales.

== Biography ==
In 1954, he became a preacher but continued performing full-time until 1960. His children are Rae-Sheaun Cheeks, June Cheeks and his daughter is singer Judy Cheeks.

== Musical career ==
Cheeks began singing in the second grade, quitting school to pick cotton and work service stations. He joined a local gospel group dubbed the Baronets and in 1946 he was spotted by the Rev. B.L. Parks, a former Dixie Hummingbird and tapped to join a group called the Nightingales. At the height of their popularity they cut several sides for Decca Records.

To make ends meet Cheeks briefly joined the Soul Stirrers, rejoining the Nightingales during the early 1950s. During the 1950s, the Nightingales had a number of hits including "Somewhere to Lay My Head" and "The Last Mile of the Way". Due to popularity, they rechristened themselves the Sensational Nightingales. In the 1950s, Cheeks was ordained as a minister in the Church of Holiness Science in Detroit; Cheeks, who had dropped out of school at an early age, was largely illiterate for most of his life, but developed a profound knowledge of the Bible via recordings on 78rpm gramophone discs.

During this time Cheeks also toured and recorded with the Mighty Clouds of Joy. After going into semi-retirement in 1960, Cheeks returned to action with a new group, the Four Knights.
