= 1925 in jazz =

- Sam Wooding and his Orchestra at the Vox Phonograph Studio, Berlin in 1925.
- Decade: 1920s in jazz
- Music: 1925 in music
- Standards: List of 1920s jazz standards
- See also: 1924 in jazz – 1926 in jazz

This is a timeline documenting events of Jazz in the year 1925.

Musicians born that year included Art Pepper and Zoot Sims.

== Events ==
- Louis Armstrong leaves Fletcher Henderson's Orchestra, returns to Chicago, Illinois, and makes his first records under his own name, leading Louis Armstrong & His Hot Five.

== Standards ==
- In 1925 standards that were published included "Dinah" and "Squeeze Me".

== Deaths ==
January

- 8 – Jimmy Palao, African-American Violinist, saxophonist, cornetist, mellophonist, and leader of the Original Creole Band (born 1879).

June

- 16 – Emmett Hardy, New Orleans American cornet player (born 1903).

August

- 16 – Edna Hicks, American singer (born 1895).

== Births ==
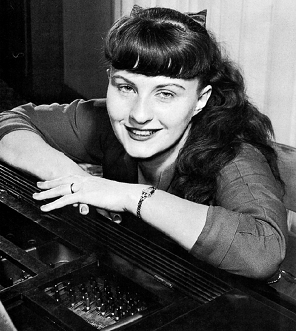
Jutta Hipp piano.

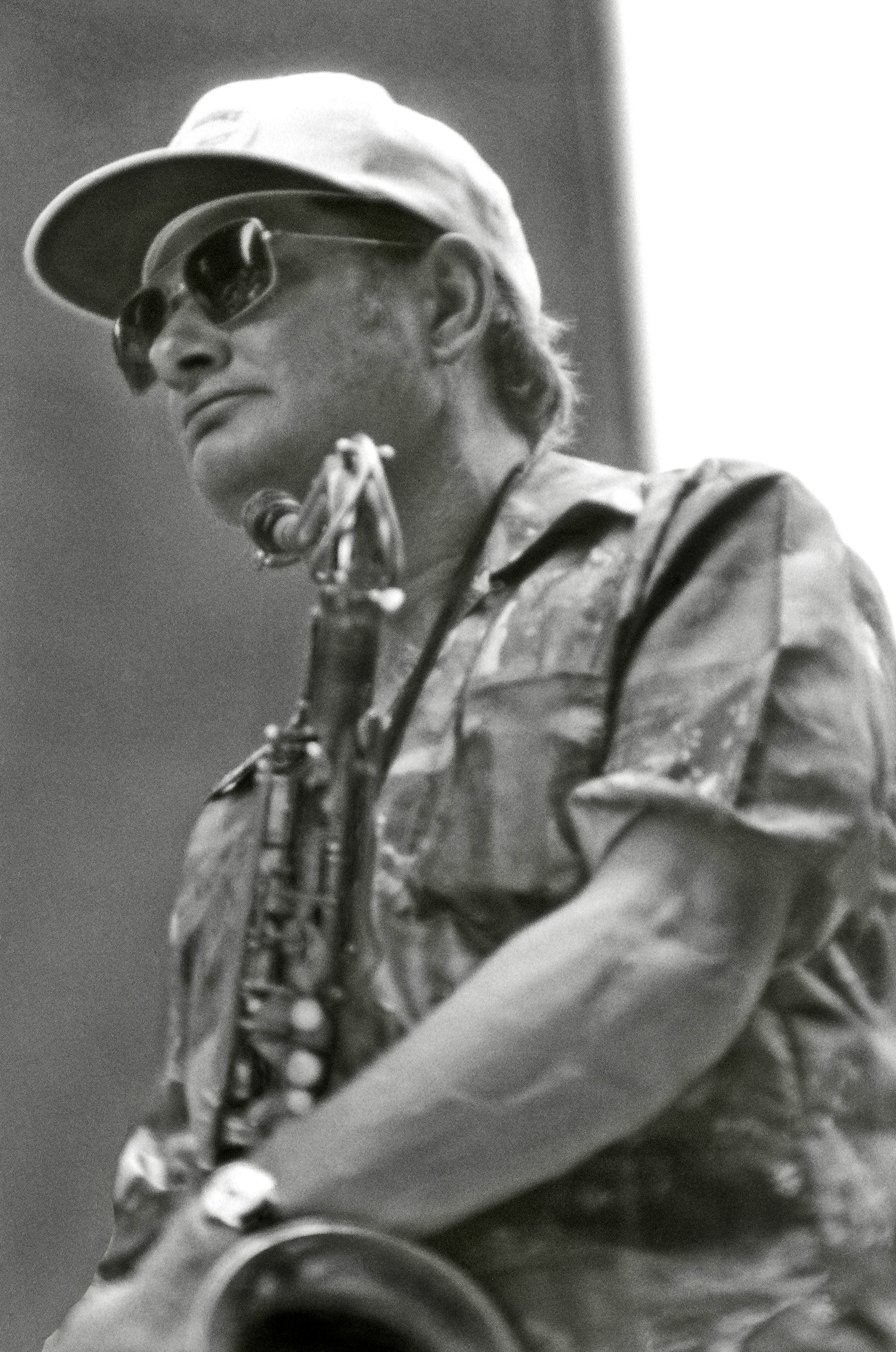
Zoot Sims 52nd Street Jazz Fair NYC July 6, 1976

January

- 6
  - Jane Harvey, American singer (died 2013).
  - Leon Abramson or Lee Abrams, American drummer (died 1992).
- 7 – Dave Schildkraut, American saxophonist (died 1998).
- 13 – Nat Peck, American trombonist (died 2015).
- 19 – Don Lang, English trombonist and singer (died 1992).
- 23 – Marty Paich, American pianist (died 1995).
- 25 – Barbara Carroll, American pianist (died 2017).

February

- 4 – Jutta Hipp, German pianist and composer (died 2003).
- 14 – Elliot Lawrence, American pianist and bandleader (died 2021).
- 20 – Frank Isola, American drummer (died 2004).
- 26 – Dave Pell, American saxophonist (died 2017).

March

- 5 – Jimmy Bryant, American guitarist (died 1980).
- 13 – Roy Haynes, American drummer and band leader (died 2024).
- 14 – Sonny Cohn, American trumpeter (died 2006).
- 21 – Harold Ashby, American saxophonist (died 2003).
- 25 – Elmer Dresslar Jr., American singer (died 2005).
- 26 – James Moody, American saxophonist (died 2010).

April

- 1 – Kathy Stobart, English saxophonist (died 2014).
- 2 – Frank Holder, Guyanese singer and percussionist (died 2017).
- 11 – Emil Mangelsdorff, German saxophonist (died 2022).
- 14 – Gene Ammons, American tenor saxophonist (died 1974).
- 18 – Leo Parker, American saxophonist (died 1962).
- 20 – Henri Renaud, French pianist (died 2002).
- 21
  - Carline Ray, American singer, pianist, and guitarist, International Sweethearts of Rhythm (died 2013).
  - Sonny Berman, American trumpeter (died 1947).
- 24 – Jiří Jirmal, Czech guitarist. (died 2019)
- 26 – Jørgen Ingmann, Danish guitarist (died 2015).

May

- 5 – Sonny Parker, American singer and drummer (died 1957).
- 9 – Eddie Preston, American trumpeter (died 2009).
- 14 – Al Porcino, American trumpeter (died 2013).

June

- 6 – Al Grey, American trombonist (died 2000).
- 23 – Sahib Shihab, American saxophonist (died 1989).
- 26 – Ken Moule, English pianist, composer, and arranger (died 1986).
- 29 – Hale Smith, American composer and pianist (died 2009).
- 30 – Wallace Davenport, American trumpeter (died 2004).

July

- 16
  - Cal Tjader, American vibraphonist and drummer (died 1982).
  - Nat Pierce, American pianist (died 1992).
- 17 – Jimmy Scott, American singer (died 2014).
- 27 – Kippie Moeketsi, South-African alto saxophonist (died 1983).

August

- 3 – Dom Um Romão, Brazilian percussionist (died 2005).
- 12 – Earl Coleman, American singer (died 1995).
- 13 – Benny Bailey, American trumpeter (died 2005).
- 15
  - George Morrow, American bassist (died 1992).
  - Oscar Peterson, Canadian pianist (died 2007).
- 16
  - Amru Sani, Indian-Jamaican singer and actor (died 2000).
  - Mal Waldron, American pianist (died 2002).
- 27 – Tony Crombie, English drummer and pianist (died 1999).

September

- 1 – Art Pepper, American saxophonist (died 1982).
- 2 – Sherwood Johnson, American jazz patron (died 1998).
- 13 – Mel Tormé, American singer (died 1999).
- 16
  - B.B. King, American guitarist (died 2015).
  - Charlie Byrd, American guitarist (died 1999).
- 18 – Pia Beck, Dutch pianist and singer (died 2009).
- 22 – Russell Solomon, American entrepreneur, art collector, and founder of the Tower Records (died 2018).

October

- 2 – Phil Urso, American saxophonist (died 2008).
- 3 – George Wein, American singer, pianist, and producer (died 2021).
- 5 – Bill Dixon, American trumpeter (died 2010).
- 7 – Alvin Stoller, American drummer (died 1992).
- 10 – Francisco Aguabella, Afro-Cuban percussionist (died 2010).
- 15 – Mickey Baker, American guitarist (died 2012).
- 18 – Boogie Woogie Red, American pianist (died 1992).
- 25 – Zena Latto, American clarinetist and saxophonist (died 2016).
- 29 – Zoot Sims, American saxophonist (died 1985).
- 30
  - Errol Parker, French-Algerian pianist (died 1998).
  - Teo Macero, American saxophonist (died 2008).
- 31 – Tommy Watt, Scottish bandleader (died 2006).

November

- 1 – Alonzo Levister, American pianist (died 2016).
- 11 – Bruno Martino, Italian singer and pianist (died 2000).
- 15 – Eddie Harvey, British pianist, trombonist, arranger, and educator (died 2012).
- 16 – Nick Travis, American trumpeter (died 1964).
- 20 – June Christy, American singer (died 1990).
- 22 – Gunther Schuller, American hornist (died 2015).
- 24 – Al Cohn, American saxophonist (died 1988).
- 25 – Matthew Gee, American trombonist (died 1979).
- 28 – Gigi Gryce, American saxophonist (died 1983).

December

- 1 – Dick Johnson, American clarinetist (died 2010).
- 5 – Alvin Tyler, American saxophonist (died 1998).
- 6 – Bob Cooper, American saxophonist (died 1993).
- 8 – Sammy Davis Jr., American singer (died 1990).
- 12 – Dodo Marmarosa, American jazz pianist (died 2002).
- 15
  - Billy Butler, American guitarist (died 1991).
  - Jimmy Nottingham, American trumpeter (died 1978).
- 23 – Janika Balázs, Serbian musician (died 1988).
- 25 – Chris Woods, American saxophonist (died 1985).
- 31 – Billy Taylor Jr., American upright bassist (died 1977).

Unknown date

- Jim Aton, American bassist (died 2008).

== Bibliography ==
- The New Real Book, Volume I. Sher Music. 1988. ISBN 0-9614701-4-3.
- The New Real Book, Volume II. Sher Music. 1991. ISBN 0-9614701-7-8.
- The New Real Book, Volume III. Sher Music. 1995. ISBN 1-883217-30-X.
- The Real Book, Volume I (6th ed.). Hal Leonard. 2004. ISBN 0-634-06038-4.
- The Real Book, Volume II (2nd ed.). Hal Leonard. 2007. ISBN 978-1-4234-2452-9.
- The Real Book, Volume III (2nd ed.). Hal Leonard. 2006. ISBN 0-634-06136-4.
- The Real Jazz Book. Warner Bros. ISBN 978-91-85041-36-7.
- The Real Vocal Book, Volume I. Hal Leonard. 2006. ISBN 0-634-06080-5.
