= International Sweethearts of Rhythm (film) =

1986 American documentary film

- DVD cover
- Directed by: Greta Schiller; Andrea Weiss
- Produced by: Greta Schiller; Andrea Weiss; Rosetta Reitz; Rebecca Reitz
- Starring: The International Sweethearts of Rhythm
- Cinematography: Greta Schiller
- Edited by: Greta Schiller
- Distributed by: Cinema Guild
- Release date: September 1986
- Running time: 30 minutes
- Country: United States
- Language: English

International Sweethearts of Rhythm: America's Hottest All-Girl Band is a 1986 American independent short documentary film directed and produced by Greta Schiller and Andrea Weiss that presents a history of the International Sweethearts of Rhythm, the first racially integrated all-female jazz band in the United States.

Using archival performance footage, still photographs, and interviews with six surviving band members and others associated with the group, the film is considered one of the major catalysts for bringing attention in the 1980s to a women's band that performed in the late 1930s through the 1940s to primarily black audiences.

The documentary was co-produced by Jezebel Productions and Rosetta Records, in association with Channel 4 (UK). Directors Schiller and Weiss established Jezebel as an independent film company "that reflected their political and artistic values" and their films "uncover stories of people and communities whose lives were overlooked and systematically erased from cultural memory".

The film was screened at numerous film festivals in both the US and Europe, and has been included in college curricula and workshops. It aired on TV in the US, the UK, and other countries worldwide.

== Synopsis ==
International Sweethearts of Rhythm opens with archival footage of Anna Mae Winburn on vocals and the band performing the song "Jump Children", interspersed with contemporary comments by Winburn, Tiny Davis, and Rosalind "Roz" Cron discussing the challenges the band faced due to gender, and celebrating the success of the band amongst their fan base. Throughout the film, except during interview sequences, the band's music is heard in the background, sometimes with still photographs of the band and individual members seen onscreen.

The film discusses the origin of the band at the Piney Woods Country Life School in Mississippi in 1937, interspersed with archival footage of life at the time for African Americans in the rural South. Band members discuss the early touring years of the group, designed to raise awareness and funds for the Piney Woods School. The film discusses the transition of performance venues from schools and churches to theaters and night clubs, and the split of the band from Piney Woods School into a professional jazz band starting in 1941. Scenes are included of women performing many different types of non-traditional jobs during World War II, and Winburn discusses her former role as director of a male jazz orchestra that was interrupted when many of her musicians were drafted into US military service.

Interviews include men associated with the band discussing how they felt about working with an all-female band. Trumpeter Tiny Davis talks about how she joined the band, and the effect that other professional musicians joining the group had on the quality of the band's performances. A comparison is made between all-white jazz bands popular at the time and the sound of the predominantly black Sweethearts. Archival footage includes the white singer Ina Ray Hutton and her all-female band, the Melodears. The popularity of the Sweethearts among black audiences is discussed, as well as the circuit of black theaters where they performed. Day-to-day life on tour is described, including the band sleeping on the bus while traveling through the segregated South. White musician Roz Cron talks about some of the ways she had to disguise herself in order to pass for black while in southern states, as well as help she received from people of color to avoid arrest because during that time and place, it was illegal for musicians of different races to perform together.

The film also discusses members' rejection of the "novelty band" label due to their hard work which was comparable with male bands of the era. Tiny Davis' role as the heart of the band is mentioned and contemporary footage of her performing excerpts from the song "Mack the Knife" is included. Band members such as Vi Burnside and musical arranger Maurice King are given credit for their contributions to the band's sound. Top name performers of the time who were fans of the band are mentioned, such as Count Basie, Ella Fitzgerald, and Louis Armstrong, who was said to have tried unsuccessfully to convince Davis to leave the Sweethearts and join his band. Drummer Panama Francis recalls a "battle of the bands" between his all-male band and the Sweethearts. Newspaper headlines and anecdotal memories about long lines of fans waiting to get into the band's performances at places such as the Apollo Theater and the Regal Theater are shared. The band's European tours with the USO at the end of World War II are depicted. The film discusses the demise of the group due to lack of jobs for female musicians after service men returned home, as well as many Sweethearts leaving the band to start families of their own. The film ends with some members discussing the positive impact of the band on their lives, followed by an excerpt of the band performing one of their signature songs, "Jump Children".

=== Interviewees ===
The following musicians or others involved with the band are named and seen onscreen in an interview setting:

- Anna Mae Winburn
- Tiny Davis
- Rosalind "Roz" Cron
- Helen Jones
- Helen Saine
- Evelyn McGee
- Jesse Stone
- Al Cobbs
- Panama Francis

Some fans of the band are interviewed onscreen but they are not identified by their full names, so they are not included in this listing.

=== Performances ===
The closing credits do not include a listing of the songs performed by the Sweethearts in the film, but archival footage of excerpts of the songs "Jump Children" and "She's Crazy with the Heat" are presented, among several others.

== Production ==
While Schiller and Weiss were doing research for Schiller's directorial debut film Before Stonewall (1985), they came across archival footage of the International Sweethearts of Rhythm. They had originally intended to include that footage in Before Stonewall to "show women doing untraditional things during World War II—the men were away and the women could play". But they realized there was a film to be made about the Sweethearts, a band with which the filmmakers were previously unfamiliar. The "more we dug, the more incredible the story became. You know, what they had to put up with as women and as a mixed, but mostly black group."

That initial footage was from a short film called Jump Children, obtained from the film collection of David Chertok. His collection also included four other "soundies" that featured the Sweethearts during 1945 and 1946, after they returned from USO tours of Europe. Clips from those five soundies were used in the film. Other sources of film footage included a 1940s US government film about venereal disease "warning against the evils of jazz clubs, alcohol and women". The filmmakers located their interview subjects thanks to the work of Marian McPartland who had organized a Sweethearts reunion for the 1980 Kansas City Women's Jazz Festival. Band member Roz Cron provided information that allowed the directors to contact the former Sweethearts interviewed in the film.

The film's opening credits state "Jezebel Productions and Rosetta Records presents". Rosetta Records had released a sound recording titled International Sweethearts of Rhythm in 1984, which featured sixteen songs from the band recorded in early 1945 and 1946. According to Rosetta Reitz's papers held at Duke University, she met producers Schiller and Weiss in 1983, and "the three, along with Reitz's daughter Rebecca, began to share creative responsibilities for the project. In 1986, with much of the work on the film completed, Reitz parted company with Schiller and Weiss over creative differences and disagreements over copyright license issues. Schiller and Weiss retained control of the project and began showing the finished film in late 1986." The legal dispute between the parties ended in 1990.

Financing for the film's production included a $15,000 grant from the New York State Council on the Arts. The film's closing credits also cite the following organizations as having provided grants for production costs: New York Council for the Humanities, The Women's Project of the Film Fund, and The Astraea Foundation.

The producers also received a grant from the Women's Film Preservation Fund of New York Women in Film & Television for preservation efforts associated with the 2007 restored version released on DVD.

== Critical response ==
Reviews of the film were generally positive. As of November 2019, there are no reviews or scores collected on Rotten Tomatoes or Metacritic.

In her review for the documentary's premiere at the New York Film Festival, critic Janet Maslin wrote in The New York Times that the film is "a delightful 30-minute trip down memory lane. The group of the title is an interracial, all-women swing band that enjoyed enough popularity during the 1940s to be remembered affectionately by the fans who are interviewed here."

Reviewing the film upon its original release, Scott Cain from The Atlanta Journal-Constitution wrote that the film "makes you glad that documentaries were invented. The film offers toe-tapping selections by the 1940s band interspersed with lively reminiscences by the participants, who have aged gracefully in the intervening 40 years."

In a review in the scholarly journal The American Historical Review, Vicki L. Eaklor says of the film that "oral and documentary history are blended masterfully to tell the story of a band that should not be forgotten…. Underlying it all, literally and figuratively, is the music, always the music: the sound track and footage of the band in performance evoke the 'International Sweethearts' more vividly than any artifact or recollection."

Reviewer Robert Arnett wrote in the journal Southern Quarterly: "The film is an interesting oddity. It touches many bases in its thirty minutes, yet does not develop any of them to a point that seems satisfactory or complete. The music, though, is irresistible, and the surviving bandmembers, especially Tiny Davis, are infectious in their enthusiasm for the band."

A review in The Daily Gazette (Schenectady, New York) stated "One of the significant issues raised in 'International Sweethearts of Rhythm' is that, had they not been women, let alone black women, a number of the band members might have enjoyed mainstream careers, and a more lasting fame. Another is that despite the prejudice of the time, these musicians experienced a freedom that then was rare for women, and that helped shape their lives."

A review in Library Journal, which helps librarians with purchasing decisions, concluded with "recommended for collections of jazz, black studies, or women's studies that can afford it". Similarly, a review of the 2007 "newly restored" DVD in Educational Media Reviews Online, an online database of reviews aimed primarily at academic librarians, gave the DVD its highest rating of "Highly recommended". As of October 2019, the film is held in 227 libraries worldwide.

== Screenings ==
The film was shown primarily at film festivals in the United States between 1986 and 1989, with international festival screenings in subsequent years. One website states that the film was shown "at over 100 festivals worldwide". Although the film has no direct mention of homosexuality, some band members were openly gay and the directors also identify as lesbians, so the film has been included in some LGBT film festivals. Additionally, Jezebel Productions released another short documentary in 1988 featuring Sweethearts member Tiny Davis and her female partner of over 40 years; that film and International Sweethearts of Rhythm were often shown together at LGBT film festivals starting in 1988. The Sweethearts documentary has also been shown at some colleges and universities, frequently as part of classes or workshops on film, jazz history, or gender studies. It was also aired on television in the US, England, and other countries.

=== Selected film festival screenings ===
- New York Film Festival (World premiere: September 28, 1986); on a double bill, tickets to this screening were sold out in advance.
- Seattle International Film Festival (May 17, 1987)
- Philadelphia International Film Festival (July 25, 1987)
- Toronto Festival of Festivals (September 12, 1987)
- Boston Film Festival (September 20, 1987)
- Jazz in the City Film Festival (San Francisco: August 28, 1988)
- Chicago Lesbian and Gay International Film Festival (October 7, 1988); Sweethearts band member and Chicago resident Tiny Davis attended the screening
- Northwest International Lesbian/Gay Film Festival (Olympia, Washington: February 1989)
- Gay and Lesbian Film and Video Festival (Atlanta, Georgia: November 17, 1990)
- Gay and Lesbian Film Festival (Tampa, Florida: June 21, 1991)
- St. John’s International Women’s Film Festival (Newfoundland, Canada: 1991)
- Festival du nouveau cinéma (Montreal, Canada: October 24, 1993)
- Everett Women in Film Festival (Everett, Washington: March 21, 1998)
- Full Frame Documentary Film Festival (Durham, North Carolina: 2003)
- Lesbisch-Schwulen Filmtage (Lesbian Gay Film Days) (Hamburg, Germany: October 2007)

=== Television airings ===
The film made its television debut on December 29, 1986 on Channel 4 in the United Kingdom. Channel 4 was credited with production assistance for the film.

The US television premiere was on March 6, 1987 on the Bravo cable television network. In 1994, it was included as part of a PBS series called Through Her Eyes that "featured the work of independent women producers and filmmakers on themes reflecting women's self-expression".

The film's official website states that it was aired "in 13 countries including Britain, France, Holland, America (both PBS and Bravo), China, Denmark, Australia, Canada and Japan" and it has also been broadcast in Yugoslavia, Denmark, and Zimbabwe.

=== Other selected screenings ===
On December 4, 1990, the film was one of three documentaries screened as part of the second Smithsonian Residents film program hosted by the Hirschhorn Museum, as a "tribute to the careers of famous blues singers and musicians".

In early 1991, the film was included in a segment called "Sisters in Jazz" which was part of a tour titled "Passion, Politics, and Popcorn" that represented selections from the 1989 and 1990 New York International Festival of Lesbian and Gay Films that played in 12 cities across the United States.

In 1997, the film was screened at the Edinburgh Filmhouse in Scotland as part of a women in jazz double bill of director Schiller's works.

In 2013, the film was included in a six-part Tribeca Film Institute program titled America's Music: A Film History of Our Popular Music from Blues to Bluegrass to Broadway, in a segment called "Swing and Jazz" that also featured episode 6 ("Swing, the Velocity of Celebration") of the Ken Burns' Jazz documentary series. The National Endowment for the Humanities provided grants to more than fifty libraries or nonprofit organizations across the US to bring America's Music to their communities.

In spring 2014, the film was shown with two other Schiller and Weiss documentaries in Bremen, Germany during the Jazz 'n' the Movies film series, in a segment titled "Frauen im Jazz".

== Awards and honors ==
- American Film Festival: First place/Blue Ribbon
- Films de Femmes (Créteil, Paris, France): Best Foreign Short
- International Leipzig Festival for Documentary and Animated Film: Jury Prize
- International Short Film Festival Oberhausen: Prize of the International Jury
- Philadelphia Film Festival: Best Documentary
- Selected for "Highlights of British Television" by the BBC

== Home media ==
The film was released in 1986 by Cinema Guild on videotape in the formats of VHS, Betamax, and U-matic.

In 2007, a "newly restored" version of the film was released on DVD, distributed by Jezebel Productions. The DVD release also included two other Jezebel Productions documentaries related to women in jazz: Tiny & Ruby: Hell Divin' Women (1988) that featured former Sweethearts trumpeter Tiny Davis; and Maxine Sullivan: Love to Be in Love (1990). An extra feature included on the DVD is a seven-minute interview with Schiller and Weiss recorded in 2006 upon the Sweethearts film's twentieth anniversary.

In 2013, the film was available in streaming format via Amazon's video service, but as of 2019 it is no longer available on that platform.

In 2019, the film is available in streaming format via Kanopy, but not all institutional subscription packages will include this particular title.

== See also ==
- The Girls in the Band, a 2011 documentary film directed by Judy Chaikin that includes some footage from International Sweethearts of Rhythm (1986)
