= International Sweethearts of Rhythm =

American all-female jazz band

- Also known as: Sweethearts of Rhythm
- Origin: Piney Woods, Mississippi, U.S.
- Genres: Jazz
- Years active: 1937–1949
- Label: Rosetta

The International Sweethearts of Rhythm was an American jazz ensemble, believed to be the first racially-integrated all-female band in the United States.

During the 1940s, the band featured some of the best female musicians of the day. They played swing and jazz on a national circuit that included the Apollo Theater in New York City, the Regal Theater in Chicago, and the Howard Theater in Washington, D.C. After a performance in Chicago in 1943, the Chicago Defender announced the band was "one of the hottest stage shows that ever raised the roof of the theater!" They have been labeled "the most prominent and probably best female aggregation of the Big Band era". During feminist movements of the 1960s and 1970s in America, the International Sweethearts of Rhythm became popular with feminist writers and musicologists who wanted to highlight previously-overlooked contributions from female musicians.

== History ==
=== Early years ===
The original members of the band had met in Mississippi in 1938 at the Piney Woods Country Life School, a school for poor and African American children. The majority who attended Piney Woods were orphans, including band member Helen Jones, who had been adopted by the school's principal and founder (also the Sweethearts' original bandleader), Laurence C. Jones. During a 1980 Kansas City Women's Jazz Festival interview, band member Helen Jones said that the existence of the International Sweethearts of Rhythm was the result of Jones's vision. In the 1930s he was inspired by Ina Ray Hutton's Melodears to create an all-female jazz band at Piney Woods. Having been an entrepreneur when it came to fundraising, in the early 1920s Jones supported the school by sending an all-female vocal group called the Cotton Blossom Singers on the road. Following the fundraising successes of the band and other Piney Woods musical groups, he formed the Swinging Rays of Rhythm led by Consuela Carter. The band toured throughout the eastern U.S. to raise money for the school. According to the saxophonist and bandleader Lou Holloway, the Swinging Rays of Rhythm became the resident all-female swing band at Piney Woods after April 1941 when the Sweethearts left and began traveling cross-country. Holloway said the Swinging Rays were understudies for the Sweethearts, performing for them when the Sweethearts had to attend school after missing too many classes. In 1941, several girls in the band fled the school's bus when they found out that some of them would not graduate because they had been touring with the band instead of sitting in class.

=== Leaving Piney Woods ===
In 1941, the International Sweethearts of Rhythm became a professional act and severed connections with Piney Woods. The band settled in Arlington, Virginia, where a wealthy Virginian supported them. Members from different races, including Latina, Asian, Caucasian, Black, Native American, Indian and Puerto Rican, lent the band an "international" flavor, and the name International Sweethearts of Rhythm was given to the group. Composed of 14- to 19-year-olds, the band included Pauline Braddy (tutored on drums by Sid Catlett and Jo Jones), Willie Mae Wong (sax), Edna Williams and thirteen others, including Helen Jones Woods, who was the daughter of the Piney Wood School's founder. Anna Mae Winburn became bandleader in 1941 after resigning from her position leading the Cotton Club Boys in North Omaha, Nebraska, which featured guitarist Charlie Christian and Fletcher Henderson. Winburn led the band until her retirement.

The first composer for the band was Eddie Durham, with Jesse Stone replacing him in 1941. Durham left the Sweethearts to form Eddie Durham's All-Star Girl Orchestra, taking some of the Sweethearts with him. Stone brought in professional musicians to help bridge the gap between experienced and inexperienced players. Two of Stone's professionals were trumpeter Ernestine "Tiny" Davis and saxophonist Vi Burnside. Both were members of the all-black Harlem Playgirls during the 1930s. The sixteen-piece International Sweethearts of Rhythm included a brass section, heavy percussion, and a deep rhythmic sense, along with many of the best female musicians of the day. About the group's self-titled recording, Lewis Porter wrote, "The sixteen recordings here reveal the dynamic blues playing and driving riffs for which the band was noted, as captured in Armed Forces Radio Service broadcasts of 1945 and 1946."

The venues where they performed were predominantly, if not only, for black audiences. These included the Apollo Theatre in Harlem, the Howard Theatre in Washington, D.C., the Regal Theatre in Chicago, the Cotton Club in Cincinnati, the Riviera in St. Louis, the Dreamland in Omaha, the Club Plantation and Million Dollar Theater in Los Angeles. Critic Leonard Feather wrote, "if you are white, whatever your age, chances are you have never heard of the Sweethearts[...]".

The Sweethearts swiftly rose to fame, as evidenced by one Howard Theater show in 1941 when the band set a box office record of 35,000 patrons in one week. In Hollywood they made short films to use as "filler" in movie theaters.

Although the International Sweethearts of Rhythm were successful, as they made two coast-to-coast tours in their bus, a few impediments remained. According to pianist Johnnie Mae Rice, because of the Jim Crow laws in the southern states of the former Confederacy, the band "practically lived on the bus, using it for music rehearsals and regular school classes, arithmetic and everything". Segregation laws prevented them from using certain restaurants and hotels. During the 1980 Kansas City Women's Jazz Festival, saxophonist Roz Cron said, "We white girls were supposed to say 'My mother was black and my father was white' because that was the way it was in the South. Well, I swore to the sheriff in El Paso that that's what I was. But he went through my wallet and there was a photo of my mother and father sitting before our little house in New England with the picket fence, and it just didn't jell. So I spent my night in jail." Because of situations like this, the band members took precautions. For example, the white women in the band wore dark makeup on stage to avoid arrest. They made relatively little money as a traveling band. According to saxophonist Willie Mae Wong Scott, "The original members received $1 a day for food plus $1 a week allowance, for a grand total of $8 a week. That went on for years, until we got a substantial raise—to $15 a week. By the time we broke up, we were making $15 a night, three nights a week."

=== Popularity ===
After Stone left in 1943 he was replaced by Maurice King, who continued the tradition of professionalism that Stone brought to the group. (King later arranged for Gladys Knight and the Detroit Spinners.) The band performed at the Apollo Theater in 1943. In 1944 the band was named "America's No. 1 All-Girl Orchestra" by DownBeat magazine. The band enjoyed a large following among African-American audiences. They played battle-of-the-bands concerts against bands led by Fletcher Henderson and Earl Hines and sold out large venues such as the Rhumboogie Club in Chicago. According to D. Antoinette Handy, the band received a larger vote than was given to Erskine Hawkins and his band. According to bassist Vi Wilson, jam sessions sometimes turned into battle of the band sessions between the Sweethearts of Rhythm and the Darlings of Rhythm. "They said, 'Those girls play like men.'" During World War II, African American soldiers overseas wrote the band letters, asking them to come to Europe to perform. When the band toured France and Germany in 1945, the members became the first black women to travel with the USO.

The International Sweethearts of Rhythm performed in 1948 with Dizzy Gillespie at the fourth annual Cavalcade of Jazz concert at Wrigley Field in Los Angeles on September 12. They also performed at the eighth Cavalcade of Jazz concert on June 1, 1952 when Anna Mae Winburn was leading. In 1980, jazz pianist Marian McPartland convinced the organizers of the third annual Women's Jazz Festival in Kansas City to reunite the Sweethearts. Included in this interview were nine of the original members as well as six of the band's later members (four were Caucasian).

=== Disbanding ===
Among the reasons given for the band's breakup were aging, deaths of members, weariness of life on the road, marriage, career changes, problems with managers, and lack of funds. Tiny Davis turned down the opportunity to tour with the band in 1946. Rae Lee Jones continued to fight for the Sweethearts, but after 1946 the key instrumentalists had left and the band began to unravel with Jones's death in 1949. Guitarist Carline Ray Russell said musical tastes were changing. Jazz writer Frank Tirro said that bebop musicians such as Dizzy Gillespie, Charlie Parker, Thelonious Monk, and Kenny Clarke were trying to change jazz from dance music to a chamber music art form.

== Legacy ==
Despite the impact of the International Sweethearts of Rhythm being mostly ignored in popular histories of jazz, the band enjoyed a resurgence in popularity among feminists in the 1960s and 1970s. In fact, the band was among the first marketed as women's music. Several feminist writers, musicologists, and others have taken on the task of elevating women's contributions to and integral participation in the making of jazz history. Flutist Antoinette Handy was one scholar who documented the story of these female musicians of color. Sherrie Tucker, author of several articles on the subject matter as well as the book Swing Shift: "All-Girl" Bands of the 1940s, states the importance of bringing women into the male-dominated version of jazz history:

[T]hrough serious study of jazzwomen's oral histories, scholars might learn new narrative strategies for imagining and telling jazz histories in which women and men are both present. Because women who played instruments other than piano were seldom the 'favored artists' of the 'superior genres,' and because they were hardly ever recorded, they have had little access to the deceptive 'coherence' of mainstream histories. Therefore, they are uniquely positioned to suggest new frameworks for telling and interpreting jazz history.

The feminist era also brought to attention the work of producer Rosetta Reitz, who worked closely with the International Sweethearts of Rhythm. Her biographical liner notes for the International Sweethearts of Rhythm record, as well as top quality recordings, have been made available worldwide through her company, Rosetta Records, whose focus is primarily to feature female and black jazz and blues musicians who are not usually recognized for their tremendous talents. The International Sweethearts of Rhythm record compilation (1984) was followed two years later by a documentary short film directed and produced by Greta Schiller and Andrea Weiss, "at the onset of the third-wave feminist movement". International Sweethearts of Rhythm: America's Hottest All-Girl Band premiered at the 1986 New York Film Festival.

There has also been considerable scholarship conducted regarding the "International" aspect of their name and the effect it had on the band's acceptance among African Americans and whites in the South. According to one jazz historian the band membership included "Willie Mae Wong, Chinese saxophonist; Alma Cortez, Mexican clarinet player; Nina de LaCruz, Indian saxophonist; and Nova Lee McGee, Hawaiian trumpet player. They were all children of mixed parents; the rest were Afro-American." A publicity poster for the band's September 1940 performance in Emporia, Virginia included the text "America's Greatest Female Band, The International Sweethearts of Rhythm, In Whose Veins Flow the Blood of Many Races: Indian, Mexican, Chinese, Negro". The first white musicians joined in 1943.

There were also several lesbians in the band, including Tiny Davis, whose independent music career and partnership with Ruby Lucas were later the subject of Schiller and Weiss' documentary Tiny and Ruby: Hell Divin' Women.

In 2004 the Kit McClure Band released The Sweethearts Project on Redhot Records. It is a tribute album recorded entirely with an all-female band using only songs the Sweethearts recorded.

In March 2011, six of the surviving members of the band donated memorabilia and artifacts from their touring years to the National Museum of American History. The ceremony marking the donations was the kick-off event of the Smithsonian Institution's Jazz Appreciation Month, and the band members received a standing ovation from attendees. The International Sweethearts of Rhythm Collection at the Archives Center, National Museum of American History makes available to the public for research news clippings, photographs, correspondence, ephemera from USO travels, newsletters, books related to the group, and sound recordings.

In 2012, the compilation album International Sweethearts of Rhythm: Hottest Women’s Band of the 1940s was selected by the Library of Congress for preservation in the National Recording Registry for being "culturally, historically, or aesthetically significant".

In May 2021, the Urban One Honors ceremony recognized the band for their contributions as a symbol of success over adversity.

== Personnel ==
The lineup of the International Sweethearts of Rhythm changed throughout the band's career. The names listed below are how the members were billed at the time; names after marriage may be different.

- Virginia Audley † – vocalist
- Grace Bayron – saxophone
- Judy Bayron – trombone
- Pauline Braddy † – drums
- Lorraine Brown – tenor and baritone saxophone
- Nancy Brown – trumpet
- Clora Bryant – trumpet and vocalist
- Vi Burnside – tenor saxophone
- Toby Butler – trumpet
- Ina Belle Byrd † – saxophone, trombone
- Ray Carter – trumpet
- Ester Louise Cooke – trumpet and trombone
- Alma Cortez † – clarinet and saxophone
- Rosalind "Roz" Cron ‡ – alto saxophone
- Ernestine "Tiny" Davis – trumpet
- Nina de La Cruz † – saxophone
- Lucille Dixon – bass
- Amy Garrison – saxophone
- Margaret "Trump" Gipson – bass
- Ione Grisham † – alto saxophone
- Irene Grisham † – tenor saxophone
- Helen Jones † – trombone
- Zena Latto – saxophone
- Roxanna Lucas – guitar
- Evelyn McGee † – vocalist
- Nova Lee McGee † – trumpet
- Colleen Murray – tenor saxophone
- Sadie Pankey † – trumpet
- Geneva Frances Perry – alto and tenor saxophone
- Marge Pettiford – saxophone
- Mim Polak – trumpet
- Corinne Posey – trombone
- Lena Posey – trombone
- Carline Ray – guitar, vocalist
- Johnnie Mae Rice † – piano
- Bernice Rothchild † – bass
- Jane Sager – trumpet
- Helen Saine – baritone and alto saxophone
- Edna Smith – bass
- Mabel Louise "Big Maybelle" Smith – vocalist
- Ernestine Snyder †
- Lucy Snyder †
- Johnnie Mae Stansbury – trumpet
- Jean Starr – trumpet
- Jean Travis – trombone
- Edna Williams † – trumpet, accordion, singer, arranger
- Selma Lee Williams – tenor saxophone
- Anna Mae Winburn – band leader, singer, piano, guitar
- Willie Mae Wong † – baritone saxophone
- Myrtle Young – tenor saxophone

Arrangers/musical directors:

- Eddie Durham
- Maurice King
- Jesse Stone

† Members of the charter 1937 band:
‡ One of the first white Sweethearts

== Discography ==
The band recorded four singles:

- "Jump Children"/"Slightly Frantic" (1945)
- "Blow Top Blues"/"Green, Green" (1945)
- "Do You Wanna Jump Children"/"Ain't the Gravy Good" (1947)
- "Sweethearts Jam"/"The Thing" (1947)

The following album is a compilation of live radio appearances:

- International Sweethearts of Rhythm: Hottest Women's Band of the 1940s (Rosetta Records), re-released with a different track order as Hot Licks 1944–1946: Rare Recordings from One of the Best American All Girl Bands of the Swing Era

=== Track listing ===
1. "Galvanizing" (Maurice King)
2. "Sweet Georgia Brown" (Bernie, Pinkard, Casey)
3. "Central Avenue Boogie" (Buck Clayton)
4. "Bugle Call Rag" (Meyers, Pettis, Schoebel)
5. "She's Crazy with the Heat" (Maurice King)
6. "Jump Children" (Sweethearts and King)
7. "Vi Vigor" (Maurice King)
8. "Lady Be Good" ( George and Ira Gershwin)
9. "Gin Mill Special" (Erskine Hawkins)
10. "Honeysuckle Rose" (Razaf and Waller)
11. "That Man of Mine" (Maurice King)
12. "Diggin' Dykes" (Vi Burnside)
13. "Don't Get It Twisted" (Maurice King)
14. "Tuxedo Junction" (Dash, Johnson, Hawkins, Feyne)
15. "Slightly Frantic" (Maurice King)
16. "One O'Clock Jump" (Count Basie)

== Filmography ==
The International Sweethearts of Rhythm were featured in several short films (including Soundies), one feature-length film, and two documentary films. They were:

- Harlem Jam Session (1946 Associated Artists Productions - Soundie)
- How About That Jive (1947 Associated Artists Productions - Soundie)
- International Sweethearts of Rhythm (1946 Associated Artists Productions - Soundie)
- Jump Children (1946 Alexander Productions - Soundie)
- That Man of Mine (1946 Alexander Productions - feature film)
- That Man of Mine (1946 Alexander Productions - Soundie)
- Harlem Carnival (1949)
- International Sweethearts of Rhythm (1986 documentary directed by Greta Schiller and Andrea Weiss)
- The Girls in the Band (2011 documentary directed by Judy Chaikin; includes segments on the band)

A 2004 DVD called Swing Era: Sarah Vaughan features Vaughan, along with little-seen material from the International Sweethearts of Rhythm.

== See also ==
- List of all-female bands
- Music in Omaha
