= Roz Cron =

American jazz saxophonist (1925 –2021)

Rosalind Cron (April 23, 1925 – February 7, 2021) was an American alto-saxophonist. During the 1940s she played with the International Sweethearts of Rhythm, an all-female jazz big band. She toured and performed for American soldiers in post-war Europe and was broadcast on national and international radio.

Following the war Cron led and participated in female big bands, while teaching extensively. In later life, she lived in Los Angeles. Cron is regarded as a pioneer of female big-band music. She was the last surviving member of the International Sweethearts of Rhythm.

== Biography ==
=== Early life ===
Cron grew up in a Jewish family in Newton, Massachusetts and began playing music from the age of nine. She learnt flute, clarinet and saxophone, listening to a lot of big band music on the family's radio. She noted "my father was the first feminist I knew”. She played in school bands and fellow students included Hal McKusick and Serge Chaloff. With Chaloff's backing, she was offered a spot with Eddie Durham's All-Star Girl Orchestra.

After graduating Cron joined Ada Leonard’s All-American Girl Orchestra and then, at 19 (1943) was invited into the all female International Sweethearts of Rhythm in New Britain, Connecticut. She was brought in as a professional to replace alto-sax player Marge Pettiford.

Being from the American north, Cron had not encountered segregation before or the racial laws enforced in the south. Many of the International Sweethearts were African American or of mixed backgrounds, and in touring the segregated southern states, Cron was often charged with illegal mixing. Dark, Jewish, Cron was introduced by the diverse band as "part Russian" to give her an aura of ethnic mystery. She darkened her looks and permed her hair to increase the air of the exotic and to fit in with the other women. The band bus often kept its shades down when travelling through the deep south and the women slept in berths on the bus, to avoid mixed accommodation laws.

Cron was made head of the sax section and she noted that the experience deeply helped her improve her musical phrasing and allowed her to make contacts. Both elements supported her through her future years. With the band she met a wide cross-section of musicians in the US and Europe, from assorted backgrounds, which gave her a compassion, respect and empathy that she says underpinned the rest of her life. Cron made her name and international reputation in the field as lead alto and featured soloist with the Sweethearts.

=== Post war ===
In July 1945 Cron and the band recorded Jubilee Broadcasts for GIs with radio NBC, shows that were relayed through Armed Forces Radio. Under pressure from listeners, the band were invited to perform for the Third and Seventh Armies abroad. They were issued USO uniforms and landed at Le Havre, driving through bombed out towns across Europe. They played troupes in Germany and France, including three weeks in Paris and shows at Nuremberg Opera House. In 1945 Cron attended a service in Stuttgart for Jewish soldiers and survivors of the liberated concentration camps, a deeply moving event that was a milestone in her life.

Cron left the Sweethearts in 1946 and lived in Spanish Harlem with bassist Helen Saine, her best friend from the group. With all the soldiers returning home after the war, Cron found it hard to get musical work; the men went back to their old jobs. She later worked in insurance, in a bank, and volunteered as a patient escort at abortion clinics, continuing to play in many groups.She taught clarinet and flute extensively and for a period worked at the American Institute of Foreign Trade. Cron joined studio bands in Los Angeles and in 1979 formed an all female, west coast, 17-piece big band with drummer Bonnie Janofsky. Cron went on to perform with the group Maiden Voyage and joined the Kansas City Salute in 1980. However working full time in corporate jobs, whilst running projects, proved to create too much pressure to continue with group leadership.

Cron married and raised two sons. During her last years she was living in sheltered accommodation outside Los Angeles.

== Legacy ==
Cron was featured in the independent short documentary film International Sweethearts of Rhythm: America's Hottest All-Girl Band (1986) produced and directed by Greta Schiller and Andrea Weiss. The film presented a history of the first racially integrated all-female jazz band in the United States. Cron was one of six surviving band members interviewed in the film.

Cron's story features in Swing Shift (2000) by Sherrie Tucker. She writes of Cron's role in the Sweethearts; that they represented "intersectional feminists ahead of their time"; "women of color and white women; lesbian and straight, all loving each other and working effortlessly together".

Cron is also profiled in the documentary film The Girls in the Band (2019), which traces the history of female big-band musicians. Cron is regarded as a pioneer of female big-band music.

The Smithsonian Institution has a collection of items related to the International Sweethearts of Rhythm donated by Cron and others.
