= Tiny Davis =

American jazz trumpeter and vocalist (1909–1994)

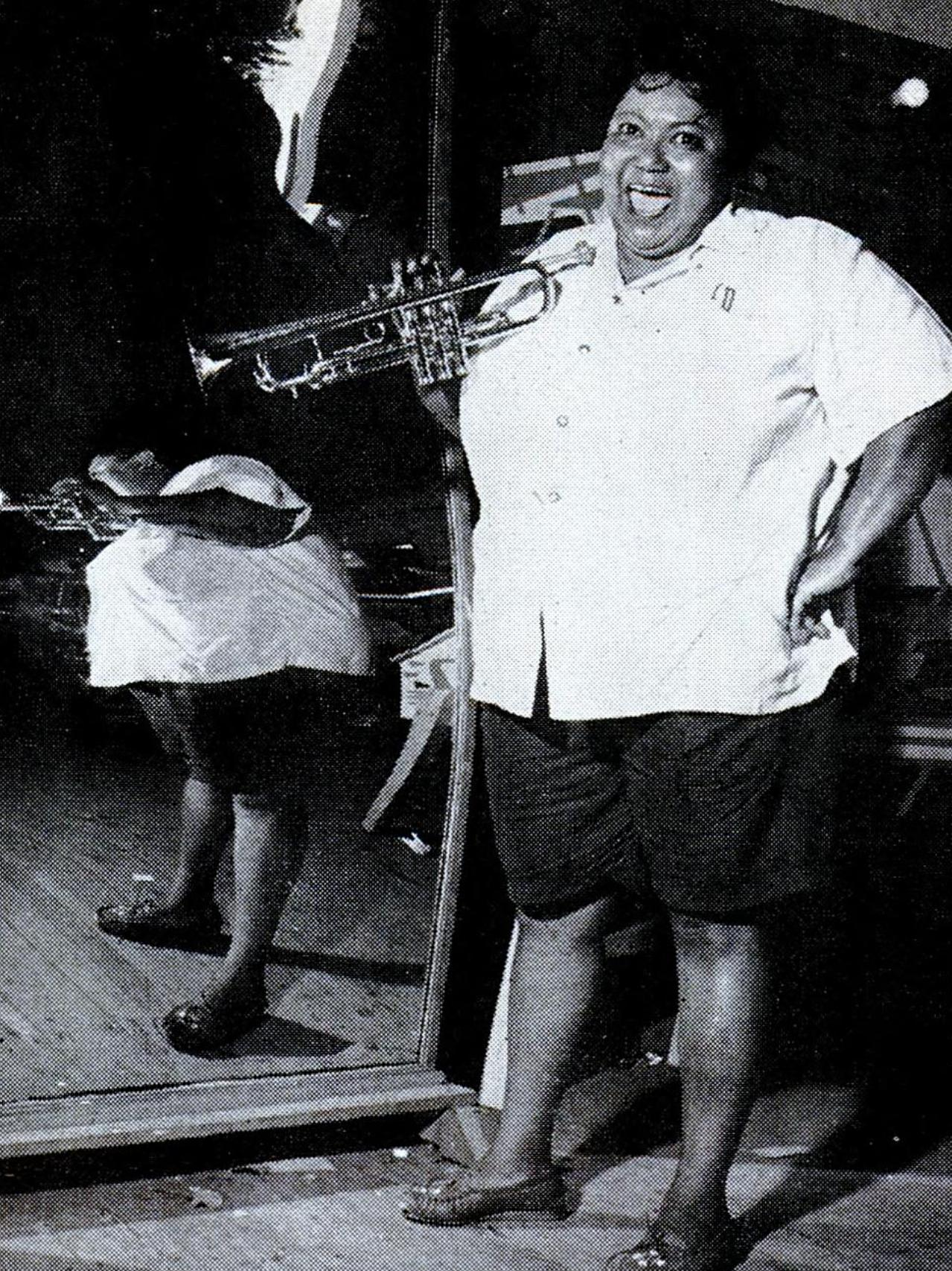
- Davis in 1955

Background information
- Born: Ernestine Carroll; August 5, 1909; Memphis, Tennessee, U.S.
- Died: January 30, 1994 (aged 84) Chicago, Illinois, U.S.

Ernestine Carroll Davis (August 5, 1909 – January 30, 1994), better known as Tiny Davis, was an American jazz trumpeter and vocalist.

== Early life and education ==
Carroll was born in Memphis, Tennessee. Born to George and Leanna (née White) Carroll, she was the youngest of seven children: four sisters and two brothers.

She began playing trumpet at age thirteen while a student at Booker T. Washington High School.

== Career ==
She moved to Kansas City in the 1930s and joined the Harlem Play-Girls in 1935, playing with the group until late 1936, when she left the group to give birth.

In 1937, the Piney Woods Country Life School of Mississippi founded the 16-piece band known as The International Sweethearts of Rhythm. The purpose of the band was to financially support the school, which educated the poor and orphaned Black children in that state. But in 1941, the Sweethearts severed their ties with the Piney Woods Country Life School, moved to Virginia, and recruited seasoned professionals to join their band. This is when Ernestine "Tiny" Davis joined. The Sweethearts were unique for the time as an all-female and racially integrated group, featuring Latina, Asian, Caucasian, Black, Native American and Puerto Rican players.

Davis played and toured with the International Sweethearts of Rhythm until 1947, including on USO tours during World War II and in the film How About That Jive. The International Sweethearts of Rhythm also played the Apollo Theater in New York City, the Regal Theater in Chicago, and the Howard Theater in Washington, DC, where their debut set a box office record of 35,000 patrons in one week. In the 1940s, Louis Armstrong and Cab Calloway, among others, came and stood in the wings to listen to her. Later, her all-female band played opposite Armstrong and Fletcher Henderson and jammed with many jazz greats. "I could have played with Count Basie, Cab Calloway—the greatest," Davis said. "But I loved them gals too much. They were some sweet gals."

After the Sweethearts disbanded in 1949, she formed her own all-female band from some erstwhile members of the Prairie View Co-eds, which she called the Hell Divers. One of these performers was alto saxophonist Bert Etta Davis. On June 25, 1950, Tiny Davis and Her Hell Divers performed at the sixth famed Cavalcade of Jazz concert held at Wrigley Field in Los Angeles which was produced by Leon Hefflin, Sr. Also featured on the same day were Lionel Hampton, PeeWee Crayton's Orchestra, Roy Milton and his Orchestra, Dinah Washington, and other artists. 16,000 were reported to be in attendance. Tiny Davis and Her Hell Divers ensemble recorded for Decca Records and toured through 1952, including in the Caribbean and Central America.

Davis was active in performance into the 1980s.

== Filmography ==
Davis was featured in two independent short documentary films produced and directed by Greta Schiller and Andrea Weiss. International Sweethearts of Rhythm: America's Hottest All-Girl Band (1986) presented a history of the first racially integrated all-female jazz band in the United States. Davis was one of six surviving band members interviewed in the film.

In 1988, she was the co-featured artist in the documentary Tiny & Ruby: Hell Divin' Women that focused primarily on Davis' career after leaving the Sweethearts, as well as her 40+-year relationship with Ruby Lucas. Tiny & Ruby had its premiere at the 1988 Chicago Lesbian and Gay International Film Festival, with Chicago residents Davis and Lucas in attendance.

== Personal life ==
As a young woman, she married Clarence Davis, and they had a son and two daughters.

Later, bassist Ruby Lucas became Davis's life partner. Lucas was among the musicians in Davis' Hell Divers group. Davis and Lucas opened a club in Chicago, Tiny and Ruby's Gay Spot, in the late 1940s, which they ran through the 1950s. The couple were together over 40 years, until Davis's death in Chicago on January 30, 1994.

== Discography ==
- Decca 48122 "DRAGGIN' MY HEART AROUND" (matrix #75440) // "I NEVER GET TIRED DOIN' IT" (75453) [released 12/1949]
- Decca 48220 "RACE HORSE" (75438) // "BUG JUICE" (75454) [released 1950]
- Decca 48246 "HOW ABOUT THAT JIVE" (75439) // "LAURA" (75455) [released 1951] note: all 6 tracks recorded 10/24/1949 (#75438/75439/75440) and 10/27/1949 (#75453/75454/75455).

== See also ==
- LGBTQ representation in jazz
