= The Dixie Sweethearts =

American jazz band

The Dixie Sweethearts were an all-women jazz group in the 1930s. Members of the group have later played with other similar acts like the Harlem Playgirls and the Darlings of Rhythm with individual members continuing to perform through the 1940s. The group was led by frontwomen Marjorie Ross and Madge Fontaine. Other members included Tiny Davis, Marjorie Pettiford, Violet Burnside, Henrietta Fontaine, who joined the spin-off group Darlings of Rhythm in the 1940s.
