= Kit McClure =

- Born: March 18, 1951; Little Falls, New Jersey
- Origin: New York City, New York
- Genres: Jazz, big band
- Occupation(s): musician, bandleader
- Instrument(s): trombone saxophone
- Years active: 1982–present
- Labels: Motéma Music
- Website: redhotrecords.com

Kit McClure (born 1951) is a jazz musician, bandleader of the all-female big band Kit McClure Band and founder of the Women in Jazz Project. In 2004, she started a project to revive interest in the all-female big band, International Sweethearts of Rhythm. She has been a featured player with the Barry White Orchestra and toured with Sam & Dave.

== Early life ==
McClure was born on March 18, 1951, in Little Falls, New Jersey. She grew up in Little Falls, New Jersey. She began learning piano and music theory at seven. She became so skilled by age 10 that her parents made her stop, which McClure attributes to their dislike of the music business. She was allowed to continue with a different instrument, but her parents vetoed her interest in the trombone as it was not ladylike. She chose the clarinet, as it was the closest thing to the saxophone which she was more interested in. Later, she was able to convince her music teacher in high school to let her switch to trombone secretly. Her parents did find out, but she was able to continue. McClure recalls how they discouraged her from playing trombone with statements like "No one will marry you. Your lips will be so strong that you'll kiss a boy and knock his teeth out." At the age of 16, she began playing trombone with local bands.

== College Years ==
In 1969, she was accepted into the first class of undergraduate women at Yale University. McClure wanted to join the Yale Marching Band but was told there are no women in the marching band. She forced them to integrate the band and allow her to join. About her experience in the Yale Marching Band, McClure recalls that "There was never a moment when I was allowed to forget that I was doing something I wasn't supposed to do." There, she formed an all-female jazz-rock fusion band while continuing to freelance as a trombonist and saxophonist. Graduating from Yale in 1975, she attended graduate school at Manhattan School of Music.

== Career ==
She formed the Women in Jazz Project because she noticed the effects of gender discrimination in jazz, for instrumentalists in particular, even though she was able to find work herself. Her Kit McClure Band opened at The Ritz (now Webster Hall) in New York City in 1982. The band's repertoire ranges from the music of Frank Sinatra and Duke Ellington to Aretha Franklin, James Brown and Beyoncé. The band's debut recording was Some Like It Hot on RedHot Records. Their second release, Burning (also on RedHot Records), was produced by Teo Macero in 1996.
