= Frances Klein =

American jazz trumpeter & bandleader (1915–2012)

- Klein in 1929

Background information
- Also known as: Frances Siskin
- Born: October 19, 1915; Cleveland, Ohio, U.S.
- Died: December 22, 2012 (aged 97) Jacksonville, Florida, U.S.
- Genre: Jazz
- Occupations: Musician; bandleader
- Instrument: Trumpet
- Years active: 1930s–2012
- Formerly of: Irene Vermillion; Ina Ray Hutton and Her Melodears; Cleveland Women's Orchestra
- Spouse: David Siskin (m. 1945)

Frances Klein (October 19, 1915 – December 22, 2012), also known as Frances Siskin, was an American jazz trumpeter and bandleader. She began her career in the early 1930s, playing in a number of bands, most notably, the all-female jazz bands led by Irene Vermillion and Ina Ray Hutton.

== Biography ==
Klein was born on October 19, 1915, in Cleveland, Ohio, where she played trumpet in the Glenville High School band. Around 1935, she was invited to play in Kermit Dart's All-Girl Band, which was led by Irene Vermillion. Klein traveled the country for two years with Vermillion's dance revue, Rhapsody in Red. Upon returning to Cleveland, she was invited to tour with Ina Ray Hutton's Melodears; after this, she returned again to Cleveland where she performed in a variety of local venues as a part of the Cleveland Women's Orchestra. Around that time, she was also the sole female member of Freddie Shafer's band. Klein led a number of bands.

On February 22, 1945, she married David Siskin and legally changed her name to Frances Siskin. In the late '70s, the Siskins moved to Jacksonville, Florida, where Klein continued playing trumpet in groups, including the Jacksonville Bulls Pep Band, the Jacksonville Gator Pep Band, and a senior citizen's band known as High Society. She died on December 22, 2012, aged 97.

== List of band memberships ==
- Kermit Dart's All-Girl Band with Irene Vermillion
- Ina Ray Hutton and Her Melodears
- Cleveland Women's Orchestra
- Frances Klein's All-Girl Orchestra
- Frances Klein and Her Formal Swingsters
- Frances Klein and Her Moderniers
- Frances Klein and Her Rhythm Boys
- United States Marine Band
- Frances Klein's All-Girl TV Band
- Jacksonville Bulls Pep Band
- Jacksonville Gator Pep Band
