= Braxton, Mississippi =

- Village
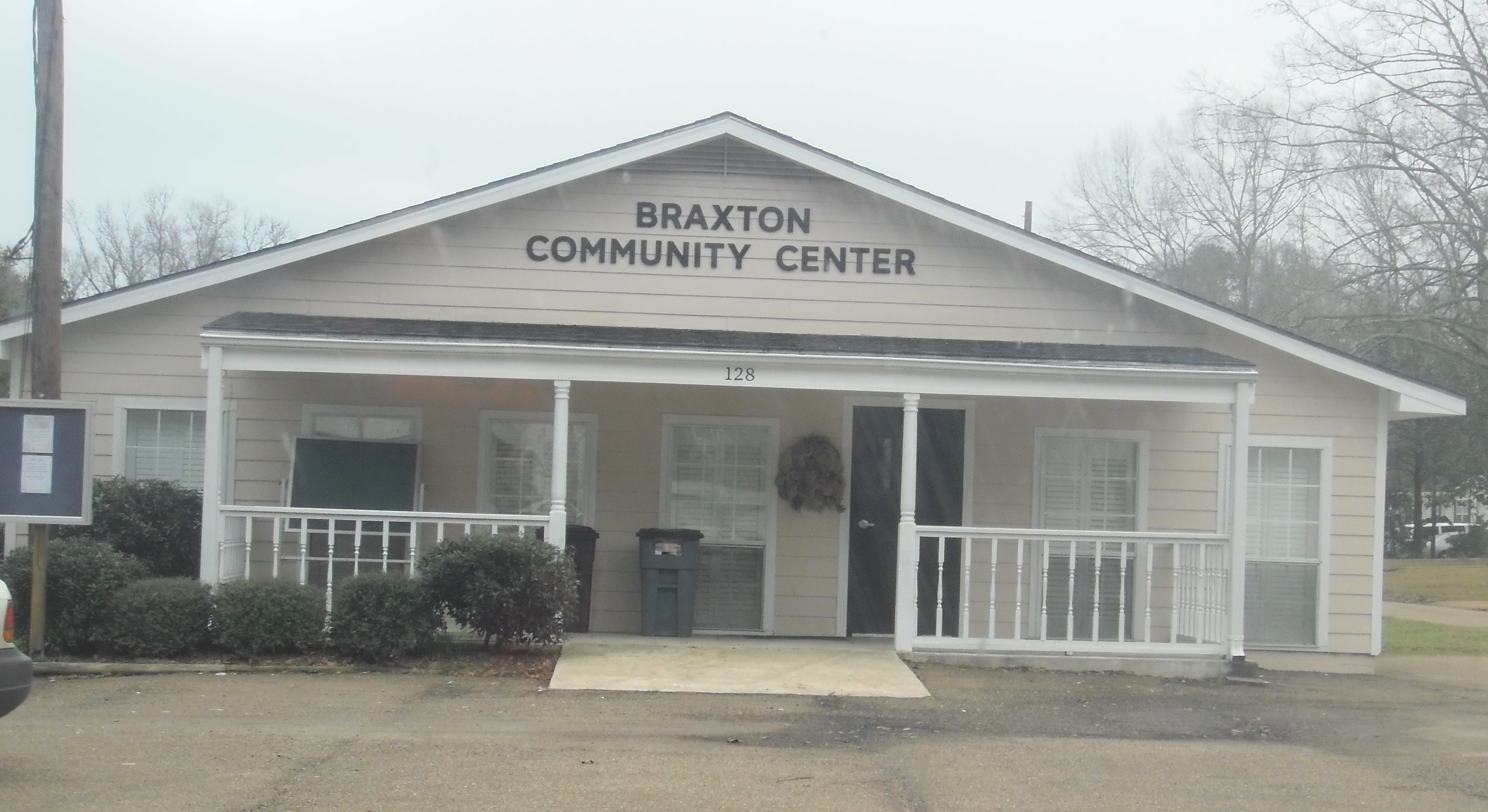
- Braxton Community Center

- Location of Braxton, Mississippi

- Location in the United States
- Coordinates: 32°1′26″N 89°58′14″W
- Country: United States
- State: Mississippi
- County: Simpson

Government
  - Type: Mayor-Council
  - Mayor: Michael Arinder

Area
  - Total: 0.59 sq mi (1.52 km^{2})
  - Land: 0.59 sq mi (1.52 km^{2})
  - Water: 0 sq mi (0.00 km^{2})
- Elevation: 354 ft (108 m)

Population (2020)
  - Total: 186
  - Density: 316.0/sq mi (122.02/km^{2})
- Time zone: UTC-6 (Central (CST))
  - Summer (DST): UTC-5 (CDT)
- ZIP code: 39044
- Area code: 601
- FIPS code: 28-08460
- GNIS feature ID: 0667533
- Website: townofbraxton.com

Braxton is a village in Simpson County, Mississippi, United States. As of the 2020 census, Braxton had a population of 186. It is part of the Jackson, Mississippi Metropolitan Statistical Area. Its zip code is 39044.

== History ==
The village of Braxton was named after Ira Braxton Standifer, the son of a physician. The population of Braxton as of 2015 was 181. Braxton is approximately 9 miles north of Mendenhall, the county seat of Simpson County and 19 miles north of Magee, Simpson County's largest city. In 2015, the town of Braxton welcomed a brand new town hall. The current mayor of Braxton is Stephanie Lee. In 2020, the population of Braxton was 179.

== Geography ==
According to the United States Census Bureau, the village has a total area of 0.6 square miles (1.6 km^{2}), all of it land.

== Demographics ==
Historical population
Census	Pop.	Note	%±
1910	286		—
1920	237		−17.1%
1930	222		−6.3%
1940	220		−0.9%
1950	206		−6.4%
1960	191		−7.3%
1970	180		−5.8%
1980	172		−4.4%
1990	141		−18.0%
2000	181		28.4%
2010	183		1.1%
2020	186		1.6%
U.S. Decennial Census

Braxton

As of the census of 2000, there were 181 people, 74 households, and 44 families residing in the village. The population density was 304.0 inhabitants per square mile (117.4/km^{2}). There were 86 housing units at an average density of 144.5 per square mile (55.8/km^{2}). The racial makeup of the village was 96.13% White, 3.31% African American and 0.55% Native American.

There were 74 households, out of which 27.0% had children under the age of 18 living with them, 48.6% were married couples living together, 9.5% had a female householder with no husband present, and 39.2% were non-families. 35.1% of all households were made up of individuals, and 18.9% had someone living alone who was 65 years of age or older. The average household size was 2.45 and the average family size was 3.09.

In the village, the population was spread out, with 27.1% under the age of 18, 5.5% from 18 to 24, 29.3% from 25 to 44, 23.2% from 45 to 64, and 14.9% who were 65 years of age or older. The median age was 36 years. For every 100 females, there were 86.6 males. For every 100 females age 18 and over, there were 80.8 males.

The median income for a household in the village was $26,250, and the median income for a family was $43,036. Males had a median income of $37,500 versus $12,500 for females. The per capita income for the village was $14,527. About 11.6% of families and 17.0% of the population were below the poverty line, including 4.5% of those under the age of eighteen and 29.3% of those 65 or over.

== Education ==
The Village of Braxton is served by the Simpson County School District.

== Notable people ==
- Pauline Braddy, musician, drummer
