= Stecker Bros. =

American booking and management agency

Stecker Brothers Agency was an American booking and management agency for territory bands that performed in the states of Wisconsin, Minnesota, Michigan, and Ohio. Stecker also owned ballrooms in Wisconsin and Michigan. Stecker's territory also included Wisconsin. Stecker's presence as a booking agent dates back to 1912. Frank Fred Stecker (1889–1978) was one of the brothers.

The Stecker Brothers, initially, had a dance orchestra (circa 1912) called the Stecker Bros. Peerless Orchestra, based in Appleton, Wisconsin.

== Notable bands under management ==
- Grant Moore and his Original New Orleans Black Devils
- Sylvester H. Rice (1905–1984)
