= Randy Brooks (musician) =

American jazz musician

Randolph E. Brooks (March 28, 1917 – March 21, 1967) was an American jazz trumpeter and bandleader.

== Biography ==
Brooks began on trumpet at age six, and by the age of 11 was discovered by Rudy Vallee, and appeared on his Fleischman Hour radio show, and became a permanent member where he played thrilling trumpet solos, but was not allowed to play with the brass section of the band. By the time he was eighteen he was working with Jerry Blane for an entire summer in western New Jersey, followed by Gene Kardos and then Ruby Newman at the Rainbow Room in New York City. He was then hired by Hal Kemp with whom he cut his first records for the Victor label in 1939. After Kemp's death late in 1940, he stayed with the band when Art Jarrett took leadership of the group. By June 1942, he had moved on to Claude Thornhill, followed a few months later by Bob Allen, but within a year he was playing with Les Brown, before founding his own band in early 1945. John Benson Brooks (no relation) contributed arrangements to the ensemble, and Stan Getz played in it in 1946. Among his hits for Decca Records were "Tenderly", "Harlem Nocturne", and "The Man With The Horn", but his swing-based style and large ensemble were out of step with the times, and his success eroded toward the end of the decade.

Brooks married bandleader Ina Ray Hutton on 10 April 1949. His first wife, La Rue Brooks, had sued him for divorce in mid-1947 because of his involvement with Hutton. Early in their Los Angeles years, Brooks and Hutton made their home at 16430 Parthenia Street. He suffered a stroke in mid-September 1950. Hutton and Brooks would divorce in July 1957.

He eventually moved back to Springvale, Maine—only a few miles from his hometown of Sanford; he died there in an apartment fire while living in a first-floor apartment in a former downtown hotel. He was the only resident not to escape, and died of smoke inhalation.

== Discography ==
=== 78rpm singles (all on Decca) ===
- 18697: "I'd Do It All Over Again" (v: Billy Usher) / "Land of the Loon" (v: Billy Usher)
- 18703: "I'm Gonna Love That Guy (Like He's Never Been Loved Before)" (with Marion Hutton) / "No More Toujours L'Amour (Hoya, Hoya)" (with Marion Hutton)
- 18713: "A Kiss Goodnight" (with Ella Fitzgerald) / "Benny's Coming Home on Saturday" (with Ella Fitzgerald)
- 18752: "In the Moon Mist" (v: Billy Usher) / "Don't Let Me Dream" (v: Billy Usher)
- 18844: "Harlem Nocturne" (with Eddie Caine-alto sax) / "Thunder Rock"
- 18874: "Without You" (Tres Palabras) (v: Harry Prime) / "Strange Love" (v: Harry Prime)
- 18897: "Surrender" (v: Harry Prime) / "One Love" (v: Harry Prime)
- 23869: "After Hours" (with Sammy Price-piano) / "Tippin' In"
- 23935: "A Night at the Deuces" / "Harlem Nocturne" [reissue]
- 24161: "Tenderley" / "Lamplight" (v: Harry Prime)
- 27205: "Holiday Forever" (Brooks' theme song) / "More Than You Know"
- 28532: "After Hours" [reissue] / "Tippin' In [reissue]
- 28533: "The Man With The Horn" / "Somebody Loves Me"
- 29479: "Thunder Rock" [reissue] / "How High the Moon"

=== Albums ===
- Trumpet Moods (Decca DL-5446 [10" LP], 1952)
- Trumpet Moods (Decca DL-8201 [12" LP], 1956) reissue with four additional tracks

=== CD compilation ===
- The Issued Recordings 1945–1947 (Jazz Band EBCD-2149, 2000)
