= Vi Burnside =

American jazz musician (1915–1964)

Violet May Burnside (April 19, 1915, Lancaster, Pennsylvania – November 19, 1964, Washington, DC) was an American jazz musician and saxophonist. She is most notably known for her work as a female tenor saxophonist in the band International Sweethearts of Rhythm. This was an all-female jazz band that was most active in the 1940s. The ensemble performed during the swing era, a time when opportunities in the American jazz industry were limited for women. There is little information on Burnside's early life in published sources, but there is more documentation that exists about her professional career as a female jazz musician.

== Career ==
Burnside worked for much of her career in all-female bands, which offered these women instrumentalists professional opportunities to perform at a time when most jazz ensembles were made up of men. Such opportunities allowed musicians like Burnside to gain professional experience, full employment, and a chance to tour around the world during the swing era. In the mid-1930s, she debuted by performing with Bill Baldwin's group before then joining the Dixie Rhythm Girls in 1937. The following year after being in those groups, Burnside then became a member of the Harlem Play-Girls in 1938, another predominately large female jazz ensemble of their time. During WWII, the rapid increase in labor shortages contributed to why these bands were so active; it helped create new performance opportunities for such female musicians.

World War II was the time when Burnside first joined the International Sweethearts of Rhythm, often described as a significant and prominent female-dominated jazz ensemble of the swing era. The ensemble gained large national recognition and performed often at USO concerts.

== Later career ==
Burnside continued with this ensemble until 1949, when she formed her own group, Vi Burnside's All-Girl Band and Vi Burnside's All Stars. Burnside and her side-women, including Flo Dreyer and Pauline Braddy, toured mostly in the mid-Atlantic region. This marked the transition when she went from playing in an ensemble to being a bandleader. Burnside continued to perform with her own group well into the 1960s, played with Anna Mae Winburn in Harlem in 1953, and also later served as an official in a local Washington, DC musicians' union.

== Musical style ==
Vi Burnside's musical style was rooted in the swing big-band traditions during the 1930s and 1940s. This was primarily seen through her work with the International Sweethearts of Rhythm as a female tenor saxophonist, where she performed both arranged pieces and improvised solos. Burnside's approach to jazz is derived from a blues foundation and reflects the broader African American musical traditions that shaped jazz's early development. The use of blues and jazz originally emerged from shared Black experiences and functioned as a form of expression rooted in both African diasporic vocal and rhythmic practices.

The swing-era was mainly from the 1930s to the 1940s and was influenced by the emergence of new musical technologies and economic policies. Within this style, artists would use musical elements like syncopated rhythmic phrasing, rhythmic interaction between different instrument sections, dancing tempos, and other stylistic influences from larger big bands. Burnside's use of the syncopated rhythms and blues-phrasing reflects the traditions of African diasporic practices, which emphasized her emotional intensity and rhythmic flexibility. Because the Sweethearts were noted for their high technical skill, tight arrangements, and strong improvisational abilities, they were described as an influential big band; especially for other women who wanted to pursue the art of music.

Women-dominated ensembles like the Sweethearts provided female instrumentalists with touring experience and a professional training environment that was similar to male big bands at the time.

== Swing and ensemble performance ==
The International Sweethearts of Rhythm operated under the same standard practices as other professional swing-era big bands, in terms of the saxophone section acting as a unit rather than having individuals solo all the time. In her section, tenor saxophones typically played the harmonizing line, background riffs behind other brass solos, and melodic passages that were arranged in the score. These were common in big-band arrangements where the swing style was often used.

== Improvisation ==
When Burnside and other members of her band were improvising, many of these solos and improvised sections included blues-based phrasing, call-and-response improvisation with the band, and engagement with the audience (could be hand claps or shouting words). The call and response patterns that are heard in the International Sweethearts of Rhythm's performances reflect the long-standing traditions in African diasporic performance structures, in which the soloist and ensemble have a musical conversation. Amiri Baraka notes that improvisation within jazz is a continuation of African American musical traditions, where an artist can showcase their expressions within a collective framework. A 1946 recording highlights these different skills as the Sweethearts perform one of their sets. Within this set, they perform multiple charts and varying arrangements.
