= Cecil Williams (anti-apartheid activist) =

Anti-apartheid activist (1909–1979)

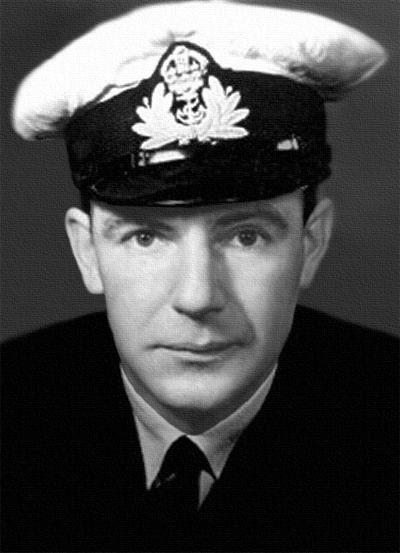
- Born: 1906; Bodmin, Cornwall, England
- Died: 1979 (aged 69–70)
- Organizations: Congress of Democrats; Springbok Legion; Anti-Apartheid Movement
- Movement: Anti-Apartheid

Cecil Williams (1906–1979) was a gay English–South African theatre director and anti-apartheid activist who assisted Nelson Mandela during his period in hiding. On 5 August 1962, Williams was arrested alongside Mandela while driving him in an Austin Westminster near Howick, KwaZulu-Natal.

== Biography ==
=== Early life ===
Cecil Williams was born in Bodmin, Cornwall in 1906. He moved with his family to South Africa in early childhood. He later returned to England for his schooling before coming back to South Africa to study. He completed an Arts degree and a teaching diploma at the University of the Witwatersrand (Wits).

He taught for six years at Pretoria Boys High School where he counted among his students the future lawyer and anti-apartheid activist Sir Sydney Kentridge, who remembered Williams as “a very inspirational teacher” who “was always talking about politics.”

During this period, he became known in Johannesburg as a radio announcer and actor. Prior to military service, he toured South Africa as a leading actor with the Gwen Ffrangcon-Davies–Marda Vanne theatrical company.

=== Military ===
During the Second World War, he joined the South African Naval Forces (SANF). He served as a member of the South African Radio Observers Unit and was deployed across the Mediterranean theatre, including assignments linked to Allied operations at Marseilles and Toulon.

=== Politics ===
Cecil Williams championed universal suffrage in South Africa as Springbok Legion chairman, defying apartheid's racial barriers, opposing white supremacist policies and fighting for equality.

Williams was elected as chairman of the Springbok Legion at the organisation's 1952 conference. Williams worked with Bram Fischer to unite the Springbok Legion and the Congress of Democrats. On 28 August 1953, just before the conference where these two organisations would merge, the Legion's offices were raided by the security police.

In September 1953, the Minister of Police ordered Williams, together with his colleague Alan Lipman, to resign from any organisation they belonged to. In addition, they were prohibited from attending any gathering or meeting for two years.

=== Theater ===
Cecil Williams was known for producing and co-producing play adaptations featuring Black, Coloured, and white performers. In collaboration with Bruce Anderson, he co-produced the Arthur Laurents adaptation of "Home of the Brave" and Arnaud d'Usseau and James Gow's play "Deep are the Roots" (1951) in Johannesburg and Cape Town. These were followed by "Montserrat" by Emmanuel Roblès, "Liliom" (1952), and Maxwell Anderson's "Winterset" (1953).

In 1958, Williams gained significant recognition for producing the premiere of Lewis Sowden's play, The Kimberley Train. Widely cited as one of the most important "protest" plays of the late 1950s, it dealt with the tragedy of the racial "pencil test". The production opened at the Library Theatre in Johannesburg on September 12, 1958, and its success and public impact continued into 1959. That same year, Williams was put on trial for treason, but later acquitted.

=== Underground Activism ===
Working within the clandestine alliance of the African National Congress and South African Communist Party (SACP), Williams was a key operative in the underground liberation movement. Using his theatre couverture as a high-profile director, he provided essential logistical support and a public shield for the activities of Nelson Mandela and the military wing, uMkhonto weSizwe (MK).

Williams had an apartment on the 16th floor of Ansteys Building. He allowed this apartment to be used as a meeting place between Nelson Mandela and his wife Winnie Mandela when the former was in hiding.

His large Austin Westminster car was sometimes used by Mandela, when he was pretending to be a chauffeur.

=== Arrest ===
In 1962, Mandela wanted to travel to Natal in order to meet with Albert Luthuli in order to discuss the ANC's relationship with the Pan-African Congress. He was then based in Lilliesleaf, and set off with Williams in the latter's car; Mandela pretended to be a chauffeur. They visited Durban, where Mandela met with Ismail Meer and his wife Fatima Meer, and then drove to Groutville, where Mandela met with Luthuli.

On Sunday afternoon, 5 August, during their return journey to Johannesburg, they were caught in a police ambush that had been set up three days earlier near Howick. Mandela hid his pistol and notebook between the two front seats and informed the police that his name was David Motsamai, although they replied that they were aware of his real identity and that he and Williams were under arrest. The police drove the pair to Pietermaritzburg, locking them in separate cells.

Williams refused to explain his links to Nelson Mandela and, shielded by white privilege under apartheid, was subsequently placed under house arrest.

=== Later life ===
In November 1962, while under house arrest, Williams managed to leave South Africa for Southern Rhodesia before joining contacts in London. He later lived in Glasgow, where he worked as a theatre director and campaigned with the Glasgow group of Anti-Apartheid Movement.

== Personal life ==
Williams was gay, and suffered homophobic attacks. Mandela's biographer Martin Meredith described Williams as "a debonair figure".

== Legacy ==
In 1998, a film about Williams, The Man Who Drove with Mandela, was released.

== See also ==
- Torch Commando
