= Kit McClure Band =

American all-female jazz big band

- Origin: New York City
- Genres: Big band, jazz, funk, swing
- Years active: 1982–present
- Labels: Redhot Records, Motéma Music
- Members: Kit McClure; Lakecia Benjamin; Lisa Parrott; Tia Fuller; Erica Von Kleist; Kristy Norter; Claire Daly; Liesl Whitaker; Barbara Laronga; Laurie Frink; Tanya Darby; Britta Langsjoen; Jennifer Krupa; Cathy Harley; Jill McCarron; Nicki Parrott; Kim Clarke; Barbara Merjan; L. Olivia Sci; Bernice Brooks; Sue Hadjopoulos; Karen Jones
- Website: redhotrecords.com

The Kit McClure Band is an all-female big band and jazz combo begun by Kit McClure in 1982 at The Ritz in New York City. It eventually caught the attention of Cab Calloway and was signed to Island Records, where it toured with Robert Palmer for two years, playing to sold-out crowds at Radio City Music Hall and Garden State Arts Center, followed by eight tours of Japan. The band released its first album, Some Like It Hot, on its own label, Redhot Records, in 1990. The follow-up, Burning, in 1995, was produced by Teo Macero.

In 2004 and 2006, the band released a pair of albums in tribute to the International Sweethearts of Rhythm, a 1940s big band consisting entirely of women, which, for much of its existence, was all-black. The second of these was released in conjunction with Motéma Music and Redeye Distribution. Both albums, The Sweethearts Project and Just the Thing: The Sweethearts Project Revisited feature exclusively material that was performed by the International Sweethearts of Rhythm, but were entirely re-imagined in a more contemporary style.

In 2005, the Kit McClure Band received the Excellence in Small Business Award from Mayor Michael Bloomberg.

== Lineup ==
- Kit McClure, tenor saxophone, alto saxophone
- Lakecia Benjamin, alto saxophone
- Lisa Parrott, alto saxophone
- Tia Fuller, alto saxophone
- Erica Von Kleist, alto saxophone
- Kristy Norter, tenor sax
- Claire Daly, baritone sax
- Liesl Whitaker, lead trumpet
- Barbara Laronga, trumpet
- Laurie Frink, trumpet
- Tanya Darby, trumpet
- Britta Langsjoen, trombone
- Jennifer Krupa, trombone
- Cathy Harley, piano
- Jill McCarron, piano
- Nicki Parrott, bass
- Kim Clarke, bass
- Barbara Merjan, drums
- L. Olivia Sci, drums
- Bernice Brooks, drums
- Sue Hadjopoulos, percussion
- Karen Jones, percussion
