= Carline Ray =

American jazz musician and vocalist (1925–2013)

- Born: April 21, 1925; Manhattan, New York, U.S.
- Died: July 18, 2013 (aged 88) Manhattan
- Genres: Jazz
- Occupations: Musician, singer
- Instruments: Piano, guitar
- Formerly of: International Sweethearts of Rhythm

Carline Ray (April 21, 1925 – July 18, 2013) was a jazz instrumentalist and vocalist. She was a member of the International Sweethearts of Rhythm.

== Early life and education ==
Carline Ray was born in Manhattan on April 21, 1925. Her father was Elisha Ray, a horn player.

She entered Juilliard at age 16, graduating in 1946 after studying piano and composition. She earned a master's degree in voice from the Manhattan School of Music in 1956.

== Career ==
After graduation from Juilliard, Ray joined the International Sweethearts of Rhythm as a rhythm guitar player and vocalist. After the Sweethearts disbanded, Ray played guitar and sang for Erskine Hawkins and later performed in a trio with fellow former Sweetheart Pauline Braddy. She sang back up for Patti Page and Bobby Darrin, and she performed in choruses conducted by Leonard Bernstein. She recorded with Mary Lou Williams and also worked with Skitch Henderson, Marian McPartland, and Sy Oliver. In 1997, Ray formed the group Jazzberry Jam with pianist Bertha Hope and percussionist Paula Hampton.

She appears in the 2011 documentary film The Girls in the Band. She released Vocal Sides, her first album as a lead singer, the year of her death. The album was produced by her daughter Catherine.

== Personal life ==
Ray married Luis Russell in 1956. Their daughter Catherine Russell is a jazz singer.

== Death ==
Ray died on July 18, 2013, in Manhattan, following complications from a stroke. A Catholic, she was buried in November 2013 after a funeral service at St Peter's Catholic Church in Manhattan.

== Awards ==
- Co-recipient of the first International Women In Jazz Lifetime Achievement Award, "A Living Legend" (1996)
- Kennedy Center's Mary Lou Williams Women in Jazz Festival Award (2005)
- International Women In Jazz Award (2008)
