= The Man Who Drove with Mandela =

1998 documentary film

- Directed by: Greta Schiller
- Written by: Mark Gevisser
- Produced by: Greta Schiller; Mark Gevisser; Simon Allen
- Starring: Cecil Williams; Corin Redgrave
- Cinematography: Michelle Crenshaw; Tania Hoser
- Edited by: Prisca Swan
- Music by: Philip Miller
- Production company: Jezebel Productions
- Release date: 28 August 1998 (Edinburgh)
- Running time: 82 minutes
- Countries: United Kingdom; United States; South Africa; Netherlands; Belgium
- Language: English

The Man Who Drove with Mandela is an internationally co-produced documentary film, directed by Greta Schiller and released in 1998. A coproduction of companies from the United Kingdom, the United States, South Africa, the Netherlands and Belgium, the film is a portrait of Cecil Williams, a British-South African theatre director and activist who played an unsung but important role in the struggle against apartheid, notably through his efforts to help Nelson Mandela evade arrest by posing as Williams's chauffeur.

As Williams died in 1979, excerpts from his own writings were narrated in the film by actor Corin Redgrave to depict his own perspective.

The film premiered at the 1998 Edinburgh International Film Festival. It was subsequently screened at the 49th Berlin International Film Festival in February 1999, where it won the Teddy Award for Best LGBTQ-related documentary film.
