= Neliska Ann Briscoe =

American dancer and jazz band leader (1914–1994)

- Born: April 7, 1914; New Orleans, Louisiana, U.S.
- Died: August 25, 1994 (aged 80); Cleveland, Ohio, U.S.
- Occupations: Dancer and jazz band leader

Neliska Ann Briscoe (April 7, 1914 – August 25, 1994) was an American dancer, jazz band leader, and businesswoman.

== Background ==
The daughter of Eddie Briscoe, a meatpacker, and Neliska Thomas, a cook and housekeeper from Mexico, Neliska Ann Briscoe was born in New Orleans, Louisiana. She had two half-brothers and a sister who died young. Briscoe's career as an entertainer began at about the age of nine when she performed in a club where her uncle, Escaliere Thomas, was employed part-time in the evenings. She got the nickname "Baby" (sometimes "Babe"), which she retained in her entertainment career as an adult.

== Early career ==
As a child, Briscoe performed in New Orleans at the St. Bernard Alley Cabaret as an acrobatic dancer in a floor show in which she was the sole child performer. A natural on the stage, Briscoe continued to perform as an acrobatic dancer and singer in such New Orleans cabarets as the Astoria, Entertainers, and the Owl in her early teenage years, often mentioned in newspaper articles as a cabaret's main draw.

In February 1931, at the age of seventeen, Briscoe moved to New York City to pursue a career as a dancer. She was employed by Small's Paradise Club.

She was out of work for at least several weeks during her recovery. In 1933, she returned to her native New Orleans to rise to such renown in the local jazz scene that she gained the title "the Sweetheart of New Orleans." Pianist Joe Robichaux hired her to lead his band, the New Orleans Rhythm Boys, a group consisting at times of up to fifteen members, including three women: Briscoe, Joan Lunceford (singer), and Ann Cooper (trumpet). Dressed in what became her trademark tuxedo, Briscoe worked as a tap dancer, entertaining the crowd in front of Robichaux's band during and between musical sets.

Briscoe worked with Robichaux for nearly five years before joining another group, the Harlem Playgirls, in early 1938. Based out of Minneapolis, Minnesota, this African-American all-woman band toured the country to popular and critical acclaim. From 1938 to 1940 Briscoe, in her tuxedo and a baton in hand, led the band when it performed at the Apollo Theater in New York City on Thanksgiving Day in 1938 and at smaller venues in Frederick, Maryland; Cleveland, Ohio; Youngstown, Ohio; and Jackson, Tennessee. The Harlem Playgirls made numerous appearances at the Tick Tock Tavern in New Orleans. By this time Briscoe was not just a "front" for the band but a true band leader.

== Personal life ==
Following her two-year tour with the Harlem Playgirls, Briscoe returned to New Orleans, where she met a merchant mariner named David "Val" Mouton. At the peak of her success she left her career in show business to marry Mouton in 1942. They had two daughters, Avon ("Vonnie") and Debra, and a son Hodges. Briscoe, a strong advocate for the right to vote, became a registered voter in New Orleans in 1948.

Briscoe divorced her husband in 1950 due to domestic abuse. After the divorce she and her daughters lived with her mother on North Tonti Street in New Orleans, and Briscoe became a successful businesswoman. She studied cosmetology, operated a gift boutique named Avon and Debra's Gift Shop after her daughters, owned a small restaurant, and worked as a seamstress, making ball gowns for Mardi Gras.

In 1957, Briscoe married Clarence Casimire, whom she had known from her youth. The marriage ceremony was performed by Briscoe's half-brother Joseph Mitchell at the Christian Mission Baptist Church he co-founded in New Orleans. Shortly after their marriage, the couple moved to Cleveland with Briscoe's daughters and Casimire's daughter from a previous marriage. They had one son. Despite her retirement from the stage, Briscoe continued to perform. She started to learn saxophone in her sixties, did splits on her seventy-fifth birthday, and danced on her eightieth birthday.

In 1994, Briscoe was hospitalized with bone cancer at St. Alexis Hospital in Cleveland. A nun at the hospital told one of Briscoe's daughters that Briscoe "had talked of being a famous dancer...about wearing a satin tuxedo and conducting an orchestra. The nun added quickly that it was surely the morphine". She died four months after her 80th birthday, on August 25, 1994.

== Awards and honors ==
In 2004, Briscoe was included in a feature exhibition celebrating the Women of Jazz at the National Historic Jazz Park in New Orleans. To commemorate the tenth anniversary of her death, her daughters set up the Baby Briscoe Scholarship Fund at Tulane University.
