= Zena Latto =

American jazz musician (1925–2016)

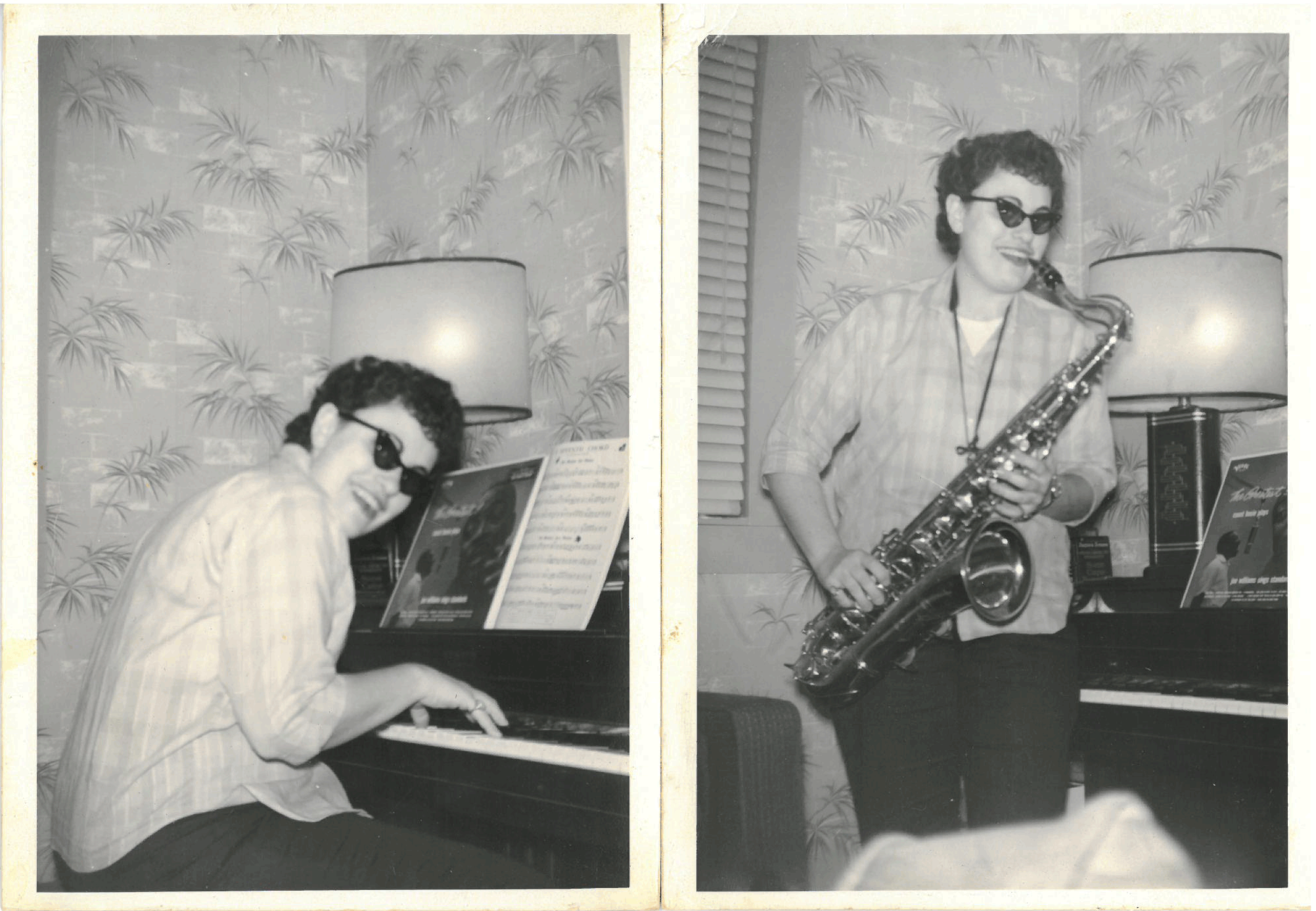
- Latto in her sister Claire Richmond's home in New Orleans, Louisiana

Background information
- Born: October 25, 1925; The Bronx, New York, U.S.
- Died: April 5, 2016 (aged 90) Jacksonville, Florida, U.S.
- Genre: Jazz
- Occupation: Instrumentalist
- Instruments: Clarinet, tenor saxophone, baritone saxophone
- Formerly of: The International Sweethearts of Rhythm, The Modern Moods

Zena Latto (October 25, 1925 – April 5, 2016) was an American jazz clarinetist and saxophonist. During the 1940s and 1950s, she played with the big band the International Sweethearts of Rhythm. She purchased a baritone saxophone to stay with that group and continued to perform with the Sweethearts until 1955. Latto performed with her own band the Moderne Moods from 1955 to 1957.

== Background ==
Latto was born in the Bronx, New York, where she lived until 1975. Her father was a Polish immigrant who worked as a tailor. Her mother was an immigrant from Russia, who worked as a seamstress in a factory after her husband died. Her two older sisters, Mildred and Claire, were also born in New York City.

== Exposure to jazz and early influences ==
Latto has stated that her sister Claire was the person who first brought her into contact with jazz music when they were growing up in New York City. One of Claire's favorite musicians was bandleader and clarinetist Benny Goodman, whom Latto credits as one of her most influential mentors. She later saw Goodman perform live at the Paramount Theater in New York City in 1940. The experience inspired her to sign up for clarinet lessons at age 16 at the Wurlitzer Music Store with the intention of becoming a clarinet player. Only later did she also learn to play the tenor and baritone saxophone.

Latto met Benny Goodman personally in 1943, and she acknowledges the active role he played as her mentor. He introduced her to the jazz scene in the New York area by inviting her to attend band rehearsals and shows, where she met many of the band's musicians backstage. According to Latto, Lester Young helped her purchase her first tenor saxophone, a Conn, the same brand he used.

In an interview from 2015, Latto recalled the harassment she and her fellow student musician friends experienced on 52nd Street during those years, both as women and as an interracial group. In the same interview, Latto recounted one extreme incident of abuse against a woman near the popular jazz club Three Deuces that caused Latto to petition New York City mayor Fiorello La Guardia with a formal complaint against the offending policeman, leading to the policeman's eventual dismissal.

== The International Sweethearts of Rhythm and the Moderne Moods ==
Latto began playing baritone saxophone in the late 1940s when she was invited by the International Sweethearts of Rhythm manager Rae Lee Jones to join the all-female band. She performed with the Sweethearts at various venues around the country, including the Apollo Theater in Harlem. When her mother fell ill with cancer in 1953, Latto stopped touring with the International Sweethearts of Rhythm in order to work part-time in an office to care for her mother.

Latto appeared on stage as a tenor saxophonist for an all-women line-up in the Carnegie Hall concert on November 29, 1957 called "Jazz Female" with fellow musicians Melba Liston, Morgana King, Elaine Leighton, Jean Ray Lee, Betty Glamann, Gloria Bell, Jean Galvis, and Anita Gibson.

This concert took place on the same evening as the historic "Thanksgiving Jazz" concert, a benefit concert for the Morningside Heights Community Center in the Carnegie's Main Hall, with performances from Billie Holiday, Dizzy Gillespie and His Orchestra, Ray Charles and His Orchestra with Lee Morgan and Benny Golson, the Thelonious Monk Quartet with John Coltrane, the Zoot Sims Quartet with Chet Baker and Mose Allison, and the Sonny Rollins Trio. Latto formed her own all-female band called the Moderne Moods. Fellow band members included Anita Gibson on vibes.

== New Orleans, Louisiana ==
Due to illness, Latto moved to New Orleans, Louisiana in 1975 to live with her sister Claire and began pursuing a formal degree in music there at age 53. Latto graduated in 1985 from Loyola University at age 60. She acknowledges the role of John Mahoney, the Jazz Director of Loyola University, in helping her achieve this goal. Latto taught a "free university" at the public library in 1977 and at home, where she taught individual children and adults clarinet and saxophone from 1986 to 1996.

== Jacksonville, Florida ==
Latto moved to Jacksonville, Florida, shortly after Hurricane Katrina destroyed her home in New Orleans, Louisiana in 2005 where she continued to live until her death in 2016.
