= Amru Sani =

Sheet music booklet cover from Italy showing Sani, 1950s.

Amru Sani (16 August 1925 – 15 August 2000) was a singer and actress who experienced short-lived fame in the United States during the 1950s and 1960s.

== Background ==
A "tall, exotic creature with a powerful, bluesy voice", she identified herself during her American heyday as hailing from India, but earlier newspaper references identified her as Jamaican. A 1954 edition of the Kingston, Jamaica, The Gleaner called her a "Jamaican 'enchantress of song.'"

Sani once claimed to have been born in Panama, to have grown up in India, to have been educated in Europe, and to have served as an airplane mechanic in England during World War II because she was too young to become a female pilot. Whether some of this information is merely show-business hype is unknown. However, the Kingston Gleaner did note in 1943 that Sani – who was already known in Jamaica as a singer – was "going to England shortly ... to join the W.A.A.F.S." (This article also listed her as "the only daughter of Mr. and Mrs. M. P. Sani of 10, Lundford Road, St. Andrew", Jamaica.)

Sani once named Dinah Shore as a major influence, citing in particular as a favorite tune Shore's "Mad About Him, Sad About Him, How Can I Be Glad Without Him Blues". She sang in four languages: English, French, Italian, and Spanish.

== Musical career ==
In 1942 she appeared with the highly popular Milton McPherson dance band of Jamaica at the Carib Theatre in Cross Roads, St. Andrew. In 1947 she appeared at the Morgan's Cove nightclub in Kingston, Jamaica, where she starred in a show called Romantic Midnite Mood. Around 1950 she appeared at the Sherry Netherland Hotel in New York City, and shortly thereafter went to Rome, where she appeared in a French musical revue. That French musical review may have been Plain Feu, in which she co-starred with Maurice Chevalier. Between 1956 and 1958 she made several appearances on The Ed Sullivan Show, including the episode on which Elvis Presley made his first Sullivan appearance.

Backed by Enoch Light and his orchestra, she recorded a 45 RPM single in 1956 for the Grand Award record label, containing the tracks "I'm in the Mood for Love" and "Tabasco" – the latter of which was used by McIlhenny Company to promote its Tabasco brand pepper sauce. Time magazine reviewed the former track in July 1956, observing: "Sani begins this oldie with a series of racking, echoing groans, but then picks up a twinkle of humor that makes everything all right." She also recorded "Once Upon A Winter Time" for Parlophone Records, and "Souvenir D'Italia" for a European label.

== On Broadway ==
Between June and December 1956 she appeared in the Broadway musical revue New Faces of 1956. The Broadway producer of New Faces, Leonard Sillman, claimed to have discovered Sani in a restaurant. "She was so chic looking and beautiful", Sillman recalled, "I called the restaurant owner over and told him, 'If she sings, I'll sign her for a show.'" One of Sani's performances from this Broadway show appears on the LP New Faces of 1956, which was issued by RCA Records that same year. RCA also released a single of Sani's "Hurry" from the New Faces performances.

== Acting career ==
As an actress, Sani appeared in the early Spaghetti Western Maracatumba ... ma non è una rumba (Italy, 1949), The Naked Maja (1958), and John Huston's The Bible: In the Beginning (1966).
