= Pauline Braddy =

American jazz drummer (1922–1996)

Pauline Braddy Williams (February 14, 1922 – January 28, 1996) was an American jazz drummer. She drummed with the International Sweethearts of Rhythm, an integrated, all-female swing band, from 1939 to 1955. An African-American, she was known as "Queen of the Drums".

== Biography ==
The Mendenhall, Mississippi-born Braddy attended Piney Woods Country Life School. In school, she played clarinet, and says she got into playing drums "by accident." When the school band went to Memphis to play, the drummer dropped out and Braddy was chosen to take up the drums because of her good sense of rhythm.

Braddy joined the International Sweethearts of Rhythm in 1939. She was not only a drummer for the group, but also sang. In 1944, she was named "Wallet Gal" by soldiers stationed in Hawaii. Braddy participated in the bands USO tour of Europe in 1945, and remained a member until 1955.

In the USO tour, Sherrie Tucker writes that "Chorus after chorus, Braddy's drums draw shouts of applause at every new configuration of paradidles." In the performances of the International Sweethearts of Rhythm, her drumming was considered a "spotlight" of the group. The Tampa Bay Times called her drumming "sensational."

Francis Davis in The Philadelphia Inquirer wrote that the band was "powered by Pauline Braddy's drumming." She was also called "Queen of the Drums."

After the Sweethearts disbanded, she moved to New York and became a drummer for the Vi Burnside All-Stars, the Edna Smith Trio and Two Plus One. Braddy moved back to Washington to care for her mother in the 1960s. She then worked for some two decades as a switchboard operator, retiring in 1994.

Braddy was eager to talk about the history of the International Sweethearts of Rhythm, and provided writer Antoinette D. Hardy with information and ephemera for her book The International Sweethearts of Rhythm. Braddy moved to Braxton, Mississippi after retiring. Braddy died in her home on January 28, 1996, aged 73.
