= Jiří Jirmal =

Czech classical guitarist (1925–2019)

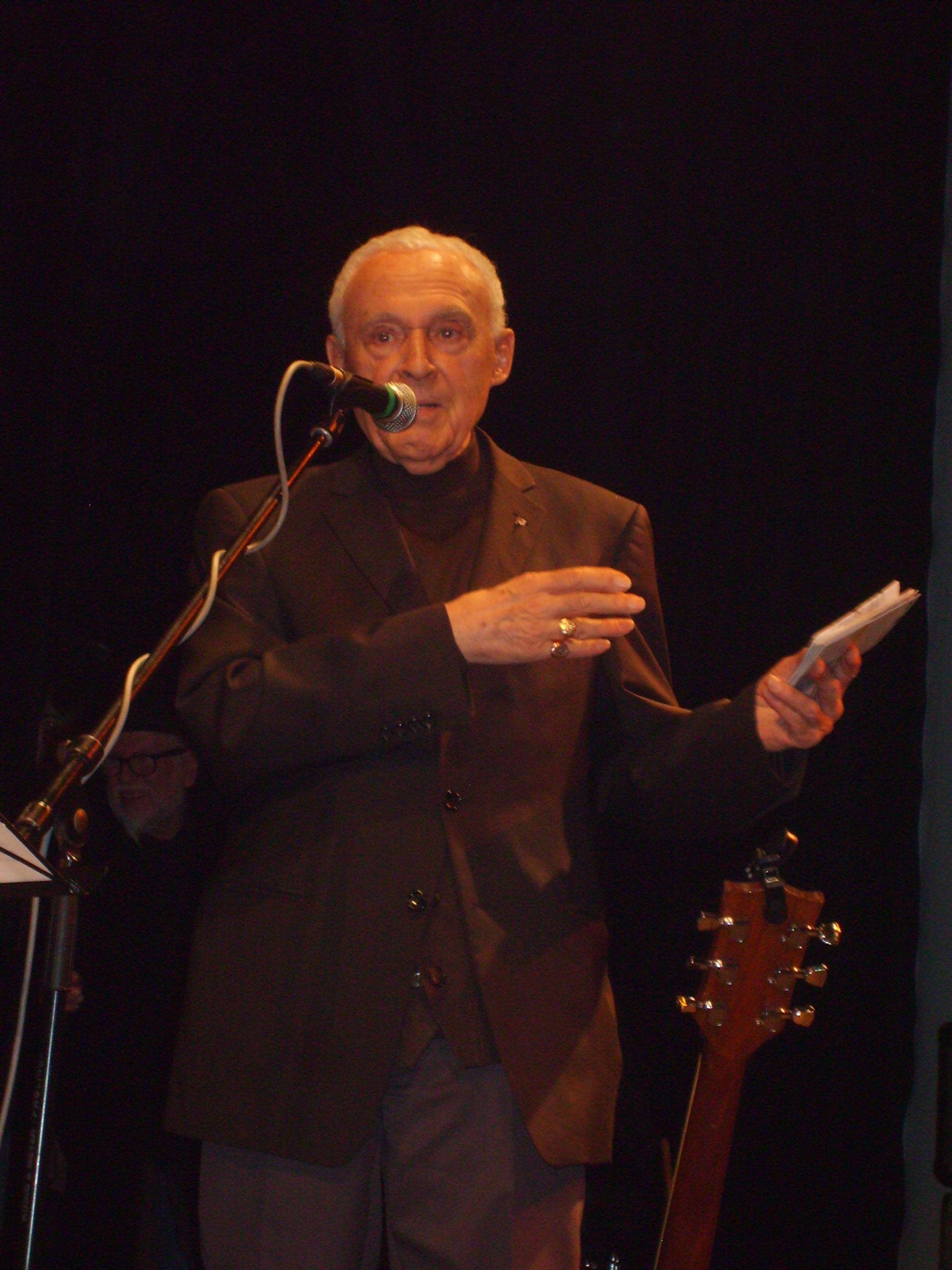
Jiří Jirmal (2010)

Jiří Jirmal (24 April 1925 – 11 December 2019) was a classical guitarist who was also dedicated to jazz.

He was born as Jiří Novák in Prague. Some of his compositions incorporate elements of Brazilian music (e.g. Bossa Nova, Samba). He contributed in the musical background for Gene Deitch's 1962 Tom and Jerry cartoon Tall in the Trap, in which he was credited as George Jirmal.
