= Russell Solomon =

American entrepreneur (1925–2018)

- Born: Russell Malcolm Solomon; September 22, 1925; Sacramento, California, United States
- Died: March 5, 2018 (aged 92)
- Occupation: Retail executive
- Known for: Founder of Tower Records

Russell Malcolm Solomon (September 22, 1925 – March 5, 2018) was an American entrepreneur who founded the worldwide retail music store chain Tower Records.

== Personal life ==
=== Early life ===
Russell Solomon was born in Sacramento, California, and grew up there during the Great Depression. His father owned a small but successful business called Tower Cut Rate Drug Store, where Solomon worked from the age of 13, absorbing lessons from his father. He had little interest in school, and had a record of both showing up late as well as leaving early. He said in a January 2011 interview for the Sacramento Bee, that he "couldn't get up in the morning" so he'd get there about an hour before lunch and go home soon afterward. Solomon said he "was thrown out of high school," although he did take some classes at Sacramento Junior College. His lack of formal education did not appear to hinder him especially since he learned valuable business lessons from his father. Solomon also spent a lot of time with the photographers who processed film.

In 1941, when only sixteen, he sold used jukebox records out of his father's drug store. When war broke out later that year he was drafted into military service; when the war was over, he returned to the drug store and his fledgling retail operation.

=== Marriages and family ===
In 1945, Solomon married his first wife, Doris; they had sons Michael, in 1948, and David, in 1962. Solomon and Doris separated in 1973, but remained on good terms. In 2010, he married Patti Drosins after a long friendship.

== Early career ==
In 1952, Solomon took his merchandising business from a few racks in the drug store owned by his father, Clayton, to a full-fledged sales company in a building across the street. He bought stock on credit, and was soon in financial difficulties due to poor sales; by 1960, his creditors had forced him to close. Solomon borrowed US$5,000 from his father and started MTS Inc., named after his son Michael, and hired Walter "Bud" Martin to run the money side of the business. A month later, by December 15, 1961, he was back in business with a new store at 2514 Watt Avenue, in Arden Arcade, a neighborhood in Sacramento, that formed the foundation for his international business.

== Tower Records ==
Eight years later, Solomon signed a lease for a 5,000-square-foot (460 m^{2}) store in San Francisco. The store was immediately profitable, so Russell Solomon expanded, to Los Angeles in 1970, and added 26 more locations in the next ten years, including a store in Sapporo, Japan, in April 1980. Over the next decade, Tower Records spread across the globe selling books and videos in addition to music. In May 1998, MTS Inc. sold $110 million worth of notes to finance more international growth. They also received a $275 million line of credit from a group of large banks. One year later the company reported its first loss, after making $76 million in the previous nine months, the loan interest payments had caused the company to lose money. Although Tower Records continued to expand it never recovered and, in 2006, the company was forced to liquidate and close.

== After bankruptcy ==
Russell Solomon, now 81, went back to his first store location in Sacramento and planned a new store opening under the name R5 Records, six months after Tower Records had shut down. Solomon did not own the Tower name, but used the same color scheme, and a logo designed by Mick Michelson, who had designed the original Tower Records logo in the 1960s. Several long time employees joined, and Solomon financed the enterprise himself. The new store was patterned after Tower, because Solomon still believed that "All we need to do is the things that made Tower successful." However, the new store was not successful, and after less than three years Solomon sold it to local Sacramento chain Dimple Records. Dimple's co-owner John Radakovits turned his grand opening into a retirement party for Russell Solomon, attended by many former Tower Records employees. Radakovits included a large oil painting of the Tower Records founder in his rock 'n' roll memorabilia display, and dedicated the store to his long-time competitor and friend.

Solomon died, apparently of a heart attack, on March 4, 2018, according to the Sacramento Bee while drinking whiskey and watching the Academy Awards, after having just criticized someone at the ceremony's fashion choice.
