= Melodears =

Refers to two separate music groups

There were two independently created and independently operating groups known as the Melodears or Melo-Dears in the 1930s and 1940s, one a band, the other a vocal trio, with similar names only by coincidence. There is no known connection between the two groups. There was, as well, a musical variety group in Ventura, California, with the same name, led by Kae Herron in the 1970s and 1980s.

The Melodears, also known as Ina Ray Hutton and Her Melodears, was an American all-female band. The band was led by singer Ina Ray Hutton and featured several musicians during its existence. The band formed in 1934, originally as a 15-member band, and was disbanded in 1939 by Hutton, who soon afterwards formed an all-male orchestra. They were the first all-female band to be recorded, initially for Vocalion Records in 1934 and later for RCA Victor.

The Melo-dears vocal trio was a female trio in the American Midwest. The trio was founded and managed by singer Arleen Gladys Reuse of Chicago, with several and various vocalists rounding out the trio, with support personnel from her friends at St. Mark's Lutheran Church, also in Chicago. This vocal trio formed in the late 1930s when Arleen (1921–2013) was still a teenager, and disbanded in 1949 when Arleen married Rev. William H. Knoderer Jr. and became choir director at several Lutheran Churches in Indiana, Ohio and Illinois. Arleen also sang with the St. Louis Summer Musicals programs (late 1940s) and with the Springfield Municipal Opera in Ohio (1956–1967) where she sang a number of lead and supporting roles. The Melo-dears made at least one appearance on the first television station in Chicago and traveled the midwest. See Bullet Point #3 for more information.

== Band members ==
Hutton was the bandleader and singer. When the band was first formed in 1934, she was 18 years old. She was often billed as the "Blonde Bombshell of Rhythm".

The band recruited several top female musicians from the United States and Canada. The original 1934 band consisted of trumpeters Kay Walsh, Estelle Slavin, and Elvirah Roh, trombonists Ruth McMurray and Althea Heuman, Ruth Bradley, saxophonists and clarinetists Betty Stitcht, Helen Ruth, and Audrey Hall, pianists Jerrine Hyde and Miriam Greenfield, guitarists Helen Baker, bassist Marie Lenz, and drummer Lil Singer.

Later notable band members included trumpet player Frances Klein, pianist Ruth Lowe Sandler, who played from 1934 to 1938, saxophonist Jane Cullum, guitarist Marian Gange, trumpeter Mardell "Owen" Winstead, and trombonist Alyse Wells. Mirian Stiglitz Saperstein also toured with the band as a saxophonist in the 1930s. In 1936, Ruth Lowe became the band's new pianist after the previous pianist took ill. Virginia Mayers became the drummer after Lil Singer.

== History ==
In 1934 Hutton was approached by Irving Mills and vaudeville agent Alex Hyde to lead an all-female orchestra, the Melodears. The group disbanded in 1939.

Hutton and her Melodears were one of the first all-female bands to be filmed. They filmed several shorts for Paramount Pictures including Feminine Rhythm (1935), Accent on Girls (1936) and Swing Hutton Swing (1937). They also filmed one feature-length movie, The Big Broadcast of 1936 (1935).

== Melo-Dears Vocal Trio ==
An independent vocal trio known as the Melo-Dears was founded by Arleen Reuse in Chicago in the late 1930s. It lasted into the latter half of the 1940s, traveling around the country, especially the Midwest, and appearing on the first commercial television station in Chicago. Though it had at least one change in membership, Arleen Reuse kept things together, arranged gigs, etc. To the best of this archivist's knowledge, there was no connection between Arleen Reuse's trio and Hutton's band, nor does he think that either group stole the name from the other. The similar names were, in all likelihood, coincidence.

During World War Two, the Melo-Dears were guests on the US Treasury Savings Bond TV Show, a live broadcast from WBKB, the first TV station in Chicago Illinois. This 1944 broadcast includes 13 minutes from one broadcast, including three Melo-Dears songs and interviews with Arleen Reuse, Betty Jayne Froehlich (sp?) and Edna Beldsoe (Edalyn Bleds?oe). At other times, the second and third positions were rounded out by Amy (née ???) Wade and Corinne Rohdenberg. Mary Ann Toelstede was one of the pianists who sometimes traveled with the group.

Two images of the Melo-Dears trio can be found here and here. Arleen Reuse is on the left in both pictures. Their travel assistant is in the second picture.

Newspaper articles include The Sheboygan (Wis.) Press and The Chicago Tribune. One reporter changed the name to "The Charm Quartette".

This material was submitted by Arleen Gladys Reuse (Knoderer)'s oldest children, John and David. The audio from the TV broadcast came from Arleen's personal files, discovered after her death.

== Melodears Variety Group ==
In the early 1970s, retired songwriter and vocalist Phyllis Kae Herron, known as "Kae," joined a kazoo band called the Rhythmettes in the Ventura Marina Mobile Home Park. A few years later, seeking to employ more of her musical talents, Kae started her own group, The Melodears, writing three-part harmonies and ukulele arrangements, performing at senior centers, military clubs and local events.

== See also ==
- International Sweethearts of Rhythm
- Darlings of Rhythm
