= Harlem Playgirls =

African-American swing band

- Origin: Midwestern United States
- Genres: Swing
- Years active: 1935-1940s

The Harlem Playgirls was an African American swing band active in the Midwest and throughout the United States from the mid-1930s to the early 1940s.

== History ==
Organized by Milwaukee-based drummer and band leader Sylvester Rice (1905–1984) in 1935 and drawing from members of the popular Dixie Sweethearts, the group toured TOBA circuits, performing in picture houses, jazz clubs, ballrooms and variety theatres. In the tradition of prior all-female bands led by musical theater stars, headliners Edna "Eddie" Crump and Neliska Ann "Baby" Briscoe both led the band as dancing, singing front women. Briscoe had gained prominence in New Orleans and had worked with Lil Hardin Armstrong’s all-female band and Joe Robichaux and his Rhythm Boys. Trombonist Lela Julius and saxophonist Vi Burnside were two of the group’s leading soloists. The group appeared at the Apollo Theater in New York City in 1937 and competed in the prestigious battle of the bands contest at Chicago’s Savoy ballroom against Johnny Long’s group in 1938. Many members later went on to perform with the International Sweethearts of Rhythm and the Prairie View Co-eds.

== See also ==
- Stecker Bros.

== Sources ==
- Dahl, Linda (1996). Stormy weather: the music and lives of a century of jazzwomen (4 ed.). Limelight Editions. pp. 53, 84–85. ISBN 978-0-87910-128-2 – via Google Books.
- Handy, D. Antoinette (1998). Black women in American bands and orchestras (2 ed.). Scarecrow Press. ISBN 978-0-8108-3419-4 – via Google Books.
- Rye, Howard. "What the Papers said: the Harlem Play-Girls and Dixie Rhythm Girls (and Dixie Sweethearts)", Storyville 1996/7, ed. L. Wright. (Chigwell, England, 1997).
- L. Wright: Pieces of the Jigsaw: Harlem Playgirls, Storyville 1998/9 (Chigwell, England, 1999), 178
