= Ina Ray Hutton =

American jazz singer (1916–1984)

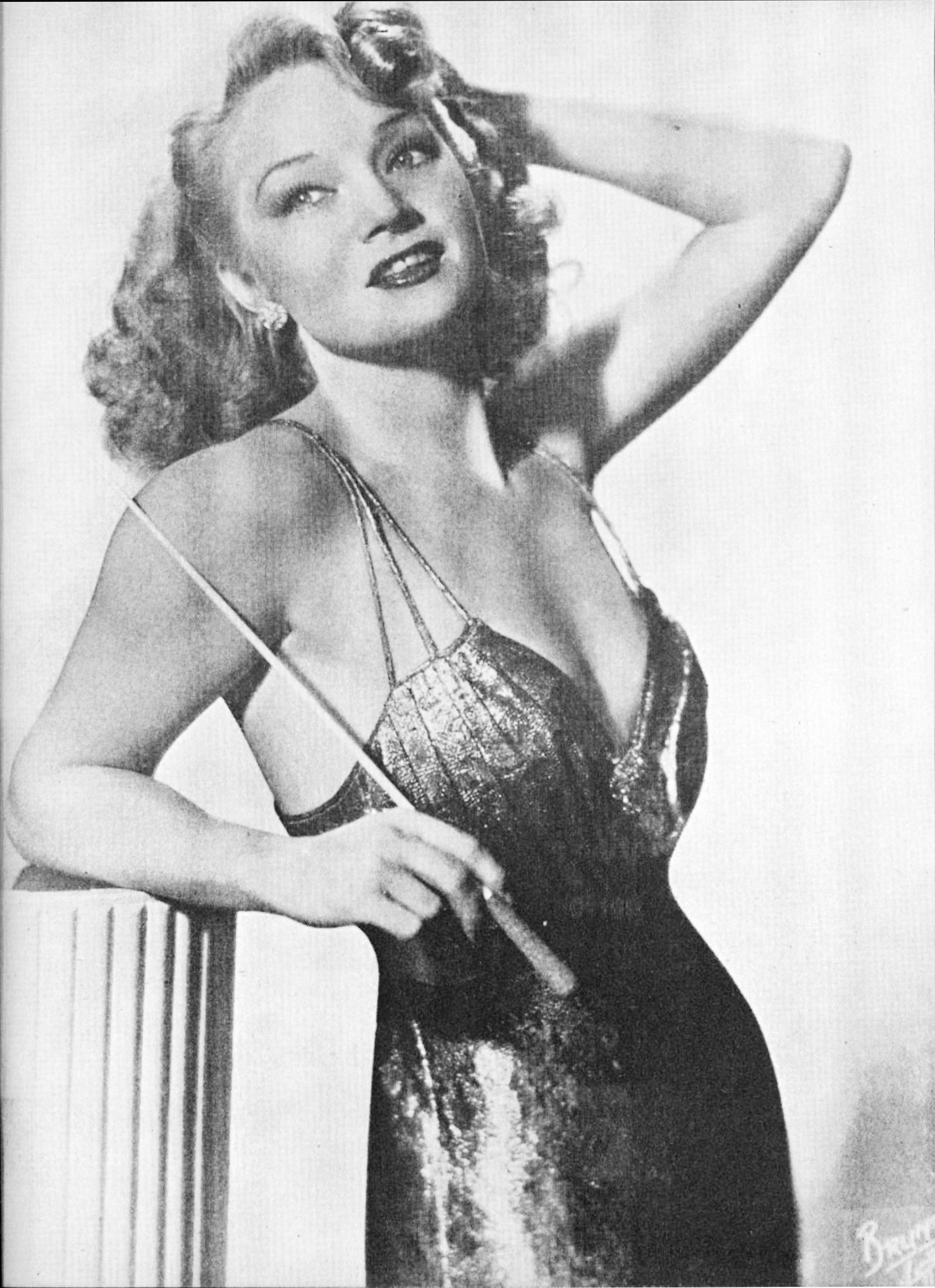
- Hutton in 1942

Background information
- Born: Odessa Cowan; March 13, 1916; Chicago, Illinois, U.S.
- Died: February 19, 1984 (aged 67) Ventura, California, U.S.
- Genres: Jazz, big band
- Occupations: Singer, bandleader
- Years active: 1926–1968

Ina Ray Hutton (born Odessa Cowan; March 13, 1916 – February 19, 1984) was an American singer, bandleader, and the elder sister of June Hutton. She led one of the first all-female big bands.

== Biography ==
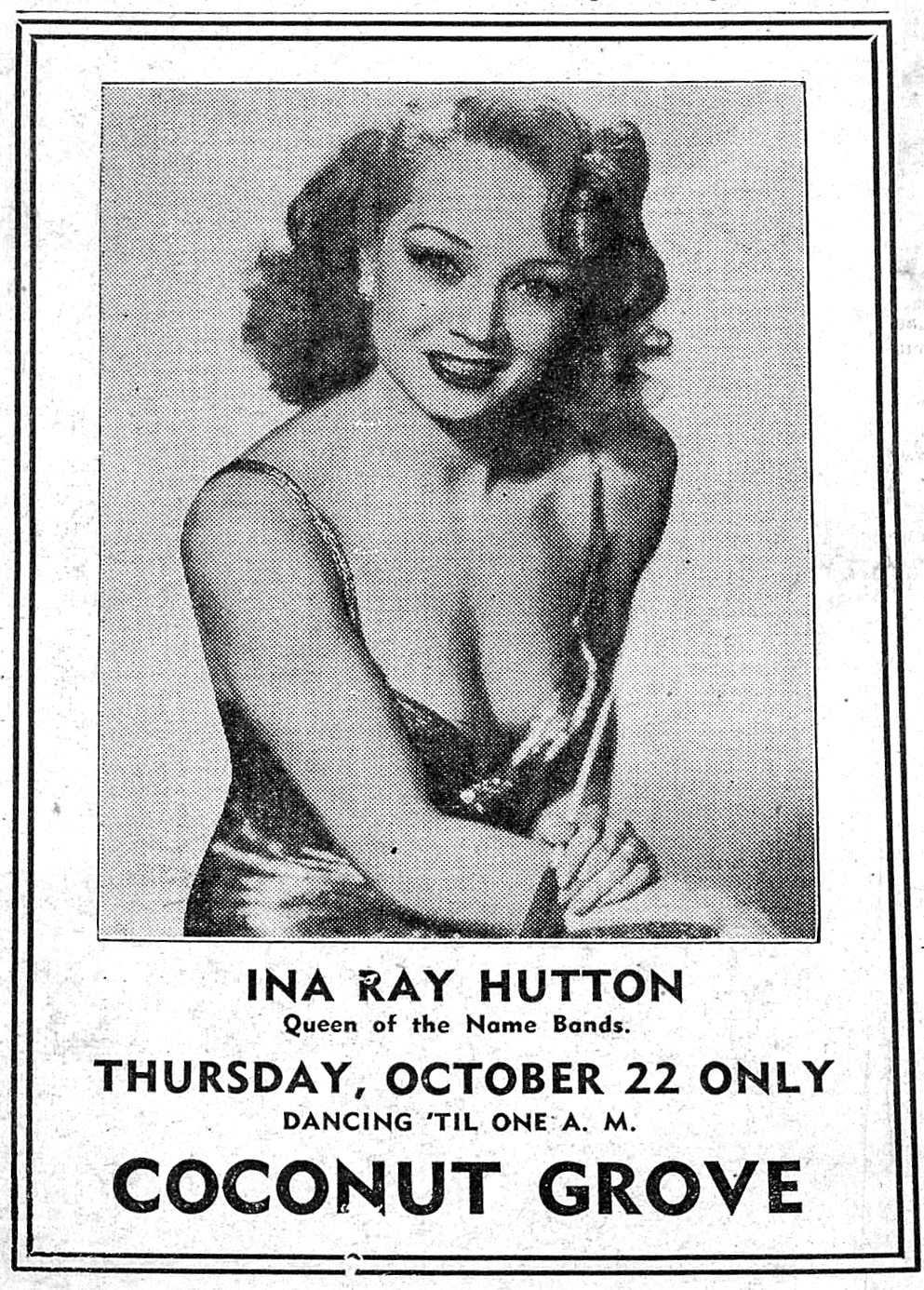
Ad for a Hutton concert at the Army Air Base, Salt Lake City, Utah, October 22, 1942

A native of Chicago, Hutton began dancing and singing on stage at the age of eight. Her mother was a pianist in Chicago. At age 15, she starred in the Gus Edwards revue Future Stars Troupe at the Palace Theater and Lew Leslie's Clowns in Clover. On Broadway she performed in George White's revues Melody, Never Had an Education and Scandals, then with the Ziegfeld Follies of 1934.

In 1934, she was approached by Irving Mills and vaudeville agent Alex Hyde to lead an all-girl orchestra, the Melodears, As part of the group's formation, Mills asked her to change her name. The group included trumpeter Frances Klein, Canadian pianist Ruth Lowe Sandler, saxophonist Jane Cullum, guitarist Marian Gange, trumpeter Mardell "Owen" Winstead, and trombonist Alyse Wells.

The Melodears appeared in short films and in the movie Big Broadcast of 1936. They recorded six songs, sung by Hutton, before disbanding in 1939. Soon after, she started the Ina Ray Hutton Orchestra (with men only) that included George Paxton and Hal Schaefer.

The band appeared in the film Ever Since Venus (1944), recorded for Elite and Okeh, and performed on the radio. After this band broke up, she started another male band a couple years later. She married jazz trumpeter Randy Brooks.

During the 1950s, Hutton formed a female big band that played on television and starred in The Ina Ray Hutton Show. She retired from music in 1968 and died at the age of 67 on February 19, 1984, from complications due to diabetes.

== Race ==
Although Hutton and some members of her family are thought to have been white, historians have theorized that she and her family were of mixed white and African-American ancestry. In 1920, Hutton herself was listed in the US Census as "mulatto" and in 1930 as "negro". Hutton was also mentioned under her birth name Odessa Cowan in the African American Chicago newspaper The Chicago Defender in several articles describing the early years of her career. A photograph of her as a 7-year-old dancer in an all-Black dance troupe appeared in a 1924 issue of the paper.

== Personal life ==
She was married and divorced five times and had no children:

- Charles Doerwald, a traveling salesman. They eloped and were married July 29, 1939. However, Doerwald's divorce from his current wife was not final and his marriage to Hutton was annulled.
- Louis P. Parisotto, saxophonist with Hutton's all-male band. Married October 27, 1943. Divorced December 3, 1946.
- Randy Brooks, trumpeter. Married April 10, 1949. Divorced June 1957.
- Michael Anter, owner of a beauty salon in Las Vegas. Married May 31, 1958. Divorced 1960.
- John "Jack" Franklin Curtis, owner of a tool company. Married April 13, 1963. Divorced December 29, 1979.

== Discography ==
- Ina Ray Hutton and Her Melodears (Vintage Music, 2001)
- The Definitive Collection (Fantastic Voyage, 2011)

== Sources ==
- "Sisters, Secrets - Ina Ray & June Hutton's Real History". J'aime Rubio, Author. April 25, 2014.
- "Secrets of a Blond Bombshell". Studio 360.
