= Rosetta Reitz =

American jazz historian, record label owner and feminist (1924–2008)

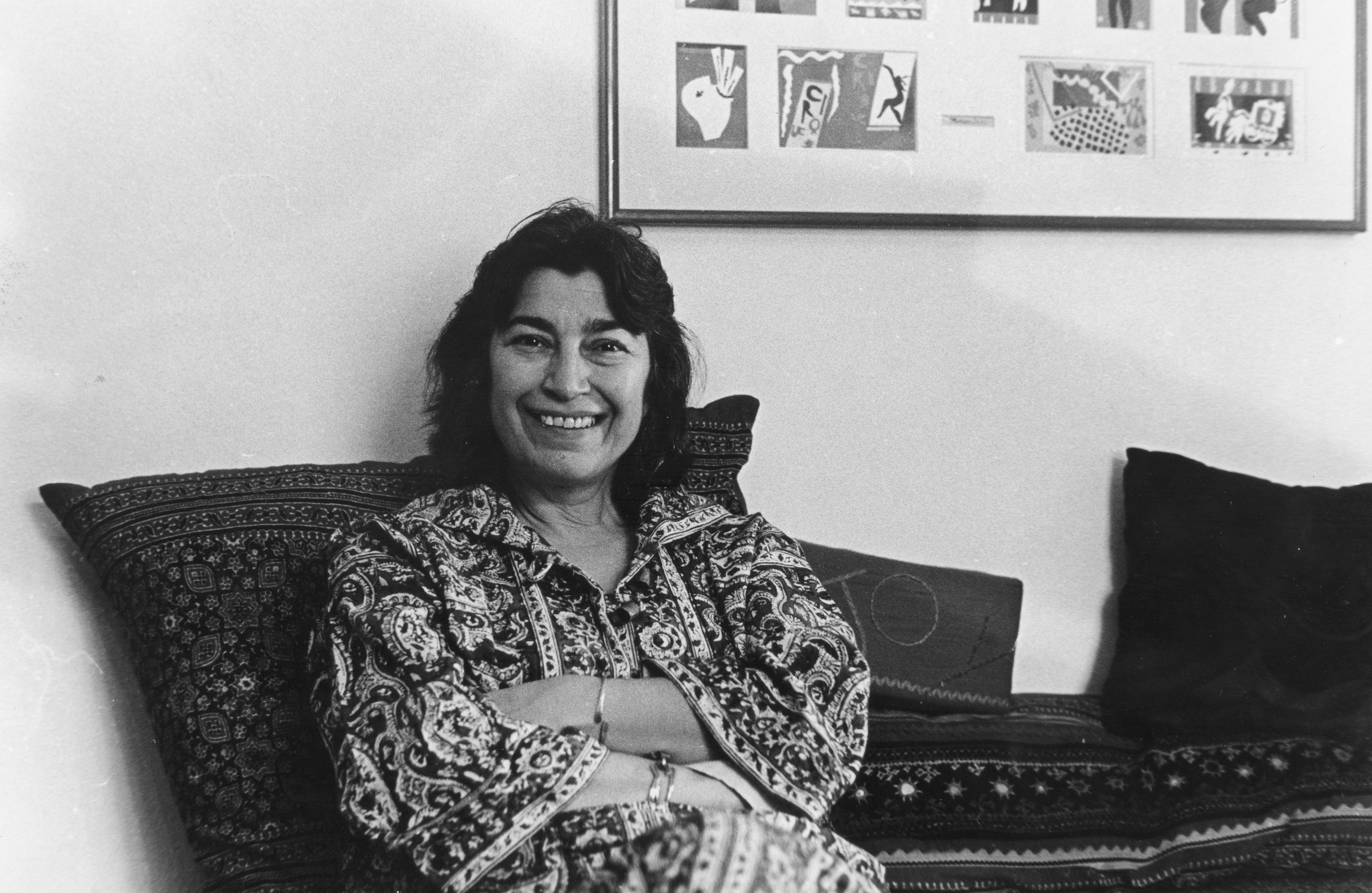
- Rosetta Reitz in 1980
- Born: September 28, 1924; Utica, New York, U.S.
- Died: November 1, 2008 (aged 84); Manhattan, New York City, New York

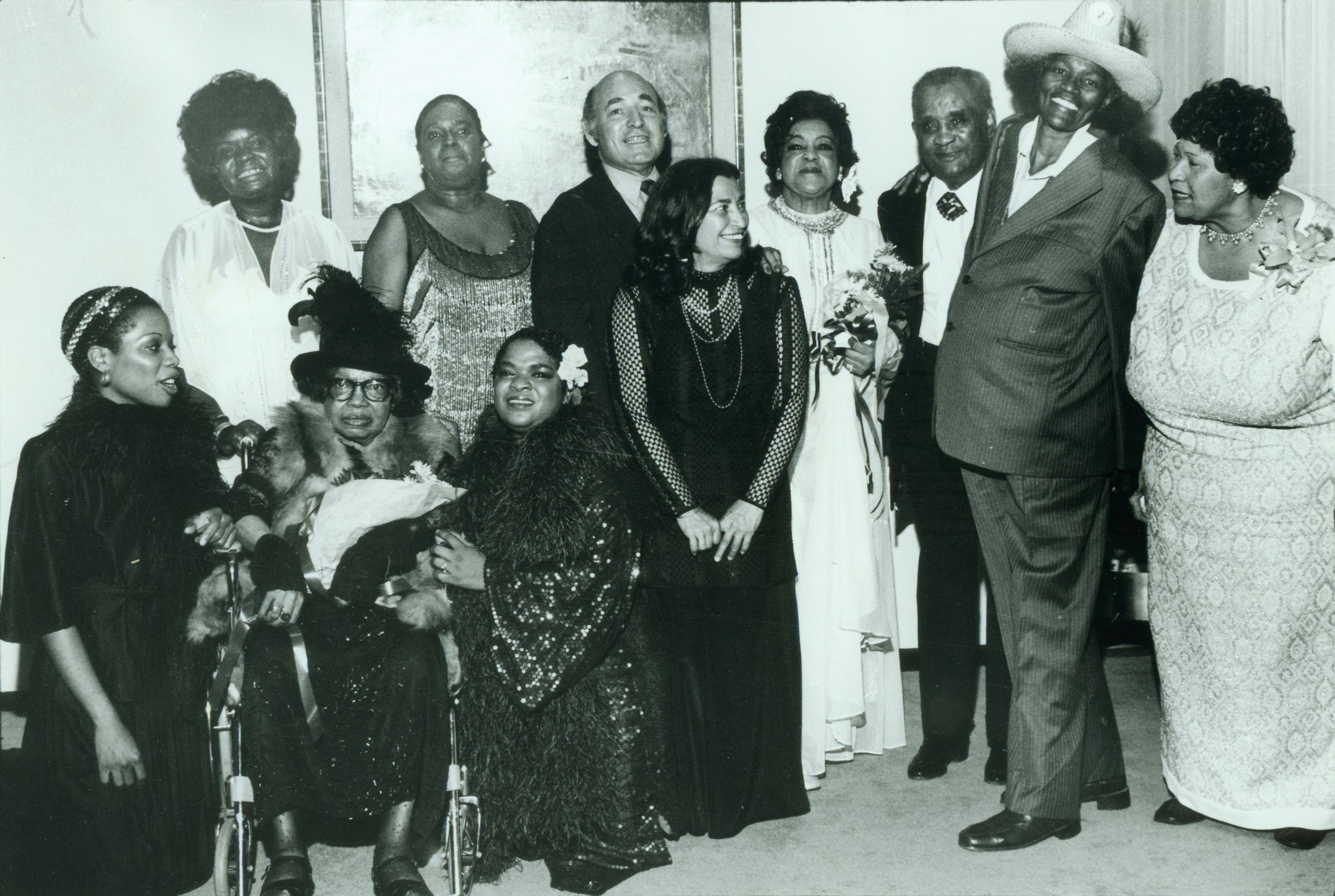
Rosetta Reitz with the Performers of the Blues is a Woman Concert at the Newport Jazz Festival; (standing, l to r): Koko Taylor, Linda Hopkins, George Wein, Rosetta Reitz, Adelaide Hall, Little Brother Montgomery, Big Mama Thornton, Beulah Bryant; (seated, l to r): Sharon Freeman, Sippie Wallace, Nell Carter

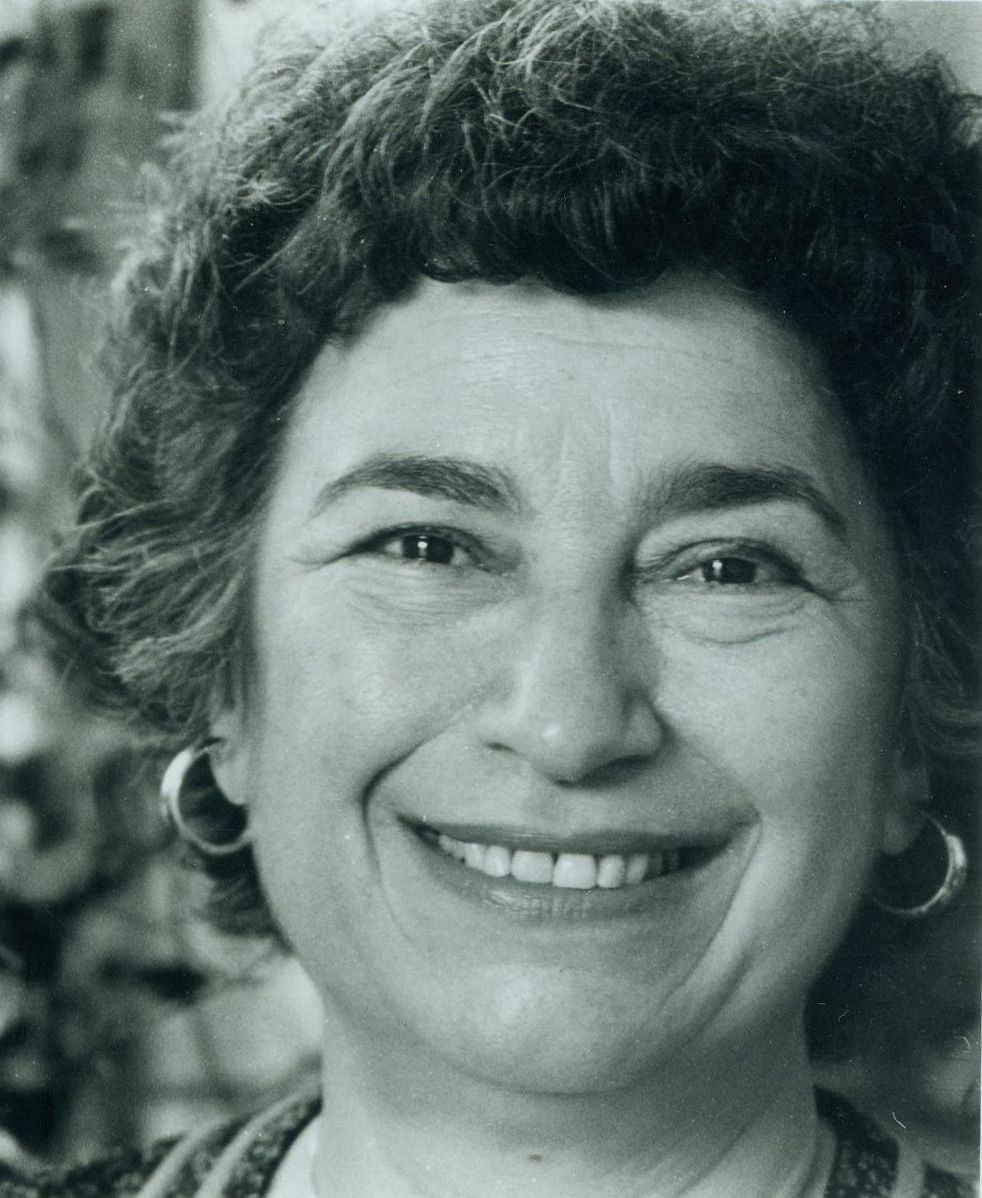
Rosetta Reitz in 1985

Rosetta Reitz (September 28, 1924 – November 1, 2008) was an American feminist and jazz historian who searched for and established a record label producing 18 albums of the music of the early women of jazz and the blues.

== Life and career ==
Reitz was born in Utica, New York on September 28, 1924. She attended the University of Buffalo for one year and the University of Wisconsin–Madison for two years. After leaving college, she moved to Manhattan and worked at the Gotham Book Mart, later opening the Four Seasons, a bookstore in Greenwich Village she operated from 1947-1956. Throughout her varied career she worked as a stockbroker, owner of a greeting card business, a college professor and a food columnist for The Village Voice and authored a book about mushrooms titled Mushroom Cookery.

Reitz was one of second-wave feminism's earliest theory writers as author of the 1971 The Village Voice article "The Liberation of the Yiddishe Mama" and was a member of New York Radical Feminists and co-founder of the Older Women's Liberation (OWL). She then wrote 1977 book Menopause: A Positive Approach, which was one of the first such books to have focused on menopause from the perspective of women, rather than with a medical approach. While writing the book, she listened to her music recordings which told of the strength of women, not their role as victims. Reitz noted that all the books she had read treated menopause as a dysfunction. She spent three years and spoke to 1,000 women in writing the book.

Using $10,000 she borrowed from friends, Rosetta Records was established in 1979. She would search for lost music, most often from record collectors. The music that Reitz discovered was usually in the public domain, but she would try to determine if there were any current rights and ensure that royalties were paid to the artists. Her music collections were built on old 78 rpm records of lesser-known performers including trumpeter and singer Valaida Snow, pianist-singer Georgia White, as well as others, such as Bessie Brown, Bertha Idaho and Maggie Jones. She also found long lost songs from better-known artists such as Ida Cox, Ma Rainey, Bessie Smith and Mae West. Her collecting covered the period from the 1920s to the 1960s, with particular attention to the Blues queens of the 1920s.

She would remaster the recordings, research the background of the artists and write liner notes. She designed the graphics for album covers and included historic photographs. While early records were shipped by mail, ultimately there were more than ten stores that carried the Rosetta label. With changes in recording media, the label switched to tapes and later CDs. Though official sales figures were never disclosed, Reitz estimated that the four "independent women's blues" compilation albums each sold 20,000 copies. The last album released came in the mid-1990s, but older releases were available online and the artists she found had been picked up by a number of mainstream recording labels.

In 1980 and 1981, Reitz organized a tribute to the "Women of Jazz" at Avery Fisher Hall as part of the Newport Jazz Festival. Called "The Blues is a Woman", the program, narrated by Carmen McRae, featured music by Adelaide Hall, Big Mama Thornton, Nell Carter and Koko Taylor. Reitz was the recipient of three awards—the Wonder Woman Award of 1982, a Grandmother Winifred grant in 1994, and the Veteran Feminists of America in 2002 Roll of Honor for feminists writers,

She died at age 84 on November 1, 2008 in Manhattan, New York of cardiopulmonary problems. She was survived by three daughters and a granddaughter.

== See also ==
- Women in musicology
