= Andrea Weiss (filmmaker) =

American documentary filmmaker and academic

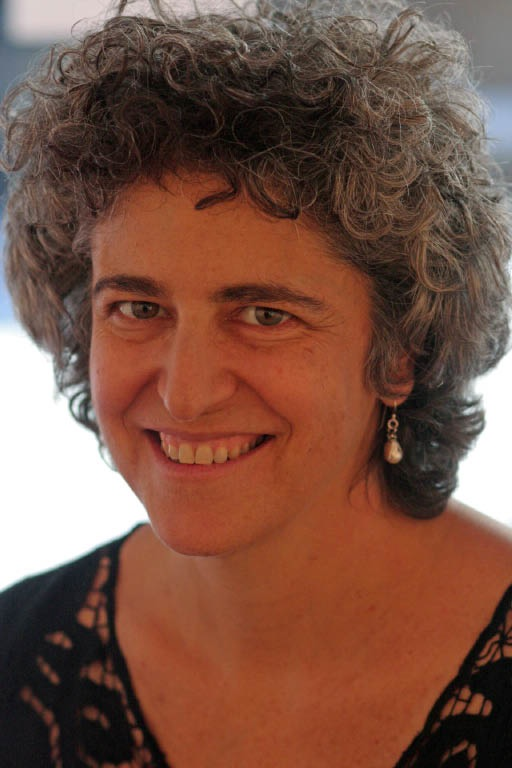
- Occupation: Filmmaker
- Notable work: Paris was a Woman

Andrea Weiss is an American independent documentary filmmaker, author, and professor of film/video at the City College of New York where she co-directs the MFA Program in Film. She was the archival research director for the documentary Before Stonewall: The Making of a Gay and Lesbian Community (1984). The film earned two nominations at the 14th Daytime Emmy Awards, Outstanding Informational Cultural or Historical Programming and Outstanding Individual Achievement in a Craft: Researchers, with her being awarded the latter.

== Personal life ==
Weiss has been awarded fellowships from the National Endowment for the Humanities, National Endowment for the Arts, New York State Council on the Arts, and New York Foundation for the Arts, as well as a U.S./Spain Fulbright Fellowship. She has a Ph.D. in History from Rutgers University.

She lives in New York City and Columbia County in upstate New York. She is married to Greta Schiller and they have a daughter, Ilana.

== Career ==
=== Books ===
Weiss is the author of: Vampires and Violets: Lesbians in the Cinema (Jonathan Cape, 1992); Paris Was a Woman: Portraits from the Left Bank (Rivers Oram Press, 1995, reprinted by Counterpoint Press in 2013), which won a Lambda Literary Award; and In The Shadow of the Magic Mountain: The Erika and Klaus Mann Story (University of Chicago Press, 2008), which won a Publishing Triangle Award. Her books have been translated into French, Spanish, German, Chinese, Korean, Swedish, Japanese, Slovenian, and Croatian. Her essays have been published in The Atlantic, The Daily Beast, The Columbia Journal of American Studies, The Gay/Lesbian Review, and elsewhere.

=== Film ===
She co-founded the non-profit film company Jezebel Productions with partner Greta Schiller, in 1984.

Film credits include International Sweethearts of Rhythm (1986), Tiny & Ruby: Hell Divin' Women (1988), Paris Was a Woman (1995), A Bit of Scarlet (1997), Seed Of Sarah (1998), Escape to Life: The Erika and Klaus Mann Story (2000) (co-directed with Wieland Speck), I Live At Ground Zero (2002), Recall Florida (2003), U.N. Fever (2008), No Dinosaurs in Heaven (2010), Bones of Contention (2017), and The Five Demands (2023).

Her 2017 feature documentary, Bones of Contention, premiered at the 2017 Berlin International Film Festival; won Best Documentary at the Side by Side Film Festival; and was featured at QFest in Houston, Outfest in Los Angeles, and the NewFest: New York LGBT Film Festival.

=== Teaching ===
She teaches at The City University of New York as a media and communication arts professor. She was named the 2019-20 Stuart Z. Katz Professor in the Humanities and the Arts, an endowment granted to support an outstanding faculty member in research and creative activity. She was working on her project Flying Lessons when given this award.

== See also ==
- List of female film and television directors
- List of lesbian filmmakers
- List of LGBT-related films directed by women
- LGBT culture in New York City
