= Greta Schiller =

American film director

- Born: 1954 (age 71–72); Detroit, Michigan, U.S.
- Occupations: Director, producer, editor, cinematographer
- Years active: 1978–present
- Known for: Before Stonewall; Tiny and Ruby: Hell Divin' Women; Paris Was a Woman; The Man Who Drove with Mandela
- Partner: Andrea Weiss
- Website: jezebelproductions.org

Greta Schiller is an American film director and producer, best known for the 1984 documentary Before Stonewall: The Making of a Gay and Lesbian Community and the 1995 documentary Paris Was a Woman.

== Career ==
Her 1976 film Greta's Girls is, following Barbara Hammer, one of the first independent short films to focus on lesbians.

She had a part in directing the 1981 documentary Greetings from Washington, D.C. which details the first important LGBT march for gay rights, held in 1979.

In 1984, Schiller directed Before Stonewall, which won two Emmy awards. The film combines interviews with multiple forms of media that shows the history of gays and lesbians during the early 20th century to the late 1960s. Before Stonewall was the first gay or lesbian film to be funded by the Corporation for Public Broadcasting.

In 1985, Schiller and Andrea Weiss founded Jezebel Productions, a nonprofit women's film production company based in New York City. Schiller and Weiss were strongly influenced by both the New Left movement and the women's and gay liberation movements of the 1970s.

Schiller and Weiss subsequently collaborated on International Sweethearts of Rhythm (1986), about African American women musicians performing in the 1930s to 1940s; Tiny & Ruby: Hell Divin' Women (1988), and Paris Was a Woman (1996). Paris Was a Woman, about creative lesbians in 1920s Paris, was a labor of love for the two filmmakers, taking 5 years to produce and breaking house records. In 2023, Schiller and Weiss co-directed The Five Demands.

Schiller directed Maxine Sullivan: Love to Be In Love (1990), Woman of the Wolf (1994), The Man Who Drove with Mandela (1998), I Live At Ground Zero (2002), and The Marion Lake Story: Defeating the Mighty Phragmite (2014). She produced and directed No Dinosaurs in Heaven (2010), about the problem of creationists infiltrating science education. In 2020, she directed The Land of Azaba, the first feature documentary on the subject of ecological restoration. Set in one of the world's first "hot spots" for increasing and maintaining bio-diversity, Campanarios de Azaba Nature Reserve in Western Spain, the film premiered at the Valladolid International Film Festival and won "Best Cinematography" in the Mystic Film Festival.

== Reception ==
The Advocate said that Greta Schiller is "gifted".

Time Out New York wrote that Paris Was a Woman might cause viewers to "want to leave their spouse and move to Paris".

The author of Black Popular Culture included a picture from the film Maxine Sullivan: Love to Be In Love on the first page of the book.

The Atlantic Journal wrote that International Sweethearts of Rhythm "makes you glad documentaries were invented".

== Awards and nominations ==
Greta Schiller has won numerous awards over her career. Before Stonewall earned her an award at the Torino Gay and Lesbian Film Festival, as well as a Grand Jury Nomination at the Sundance Film Festival.

Tiny and Ruby: Hell Divin' Women earned Schiller a Teddy at the Berlin International Film Festival. She won another Teddy in 1999 for Best Documentary for The Man Who Drove with Mandela. The film also won Best Documentary at the Milan International Lesbian and Gay Film Festival, and was nominated for Best Documentary at the Newport International Film Festival in Rhode Island.

In 2019, Schiller's film Before Stonewall was selected by the Library of Congress for preservation in the National Film Registry for being "culturally, historically, or aesthetically significant".

== Filmography ==
- Greta's Girls (1978)
- Greetings from Washington, D.C. (1981)
- Before Stonewall (1984)
- International Sweethearts of Rhythm (1986)
- Tiny and Ruby: Hell Divin' Women (1989)
- Maxine Sullivan: Love to Be In Love (1990)
- Woman of the Wolf (1994)
- Paris Was a Woman (1996)
- The Man Who Drove with Mandela (1998)
- Seed of Sarah (1998)
- Escape To Life: The Erika and Klaus Mann Story (2000) (directed by Andrea Weiss)
- I Live at Ground Zero (2002)
- U.N. Fever (2008)
- No Dinosaurs in Heaven (2010)
- The Marion Lake Story: Defeating the Mighty Phragmite (2014)
- Bones of Contention (2017)
- The Land of Azaba (2020)
- The Five Demands (2023)

== Personal life ==
Schiller received the US/UK Fulbright Arts Fellowship in Film and grants from multiple organisations. She is openly lesbian.

== See also ==
- List of female film and television directors
- List of lesbian filmmakers
- List of LGBT-related films directed by women
- List of LGBT people from New York City
- NYC Pride March
