= 555 Edgecombe Avenue =

Residential building in Manhattan, New York

- Paul Robeson Residence (555 Edgecombe Avenue)
- U.S. National Register of Historic Places
- U.S. National Historic Landmark
- U.S. Historic district – Contributing property
- New York State Register of Historic Places
- New York City Landmark
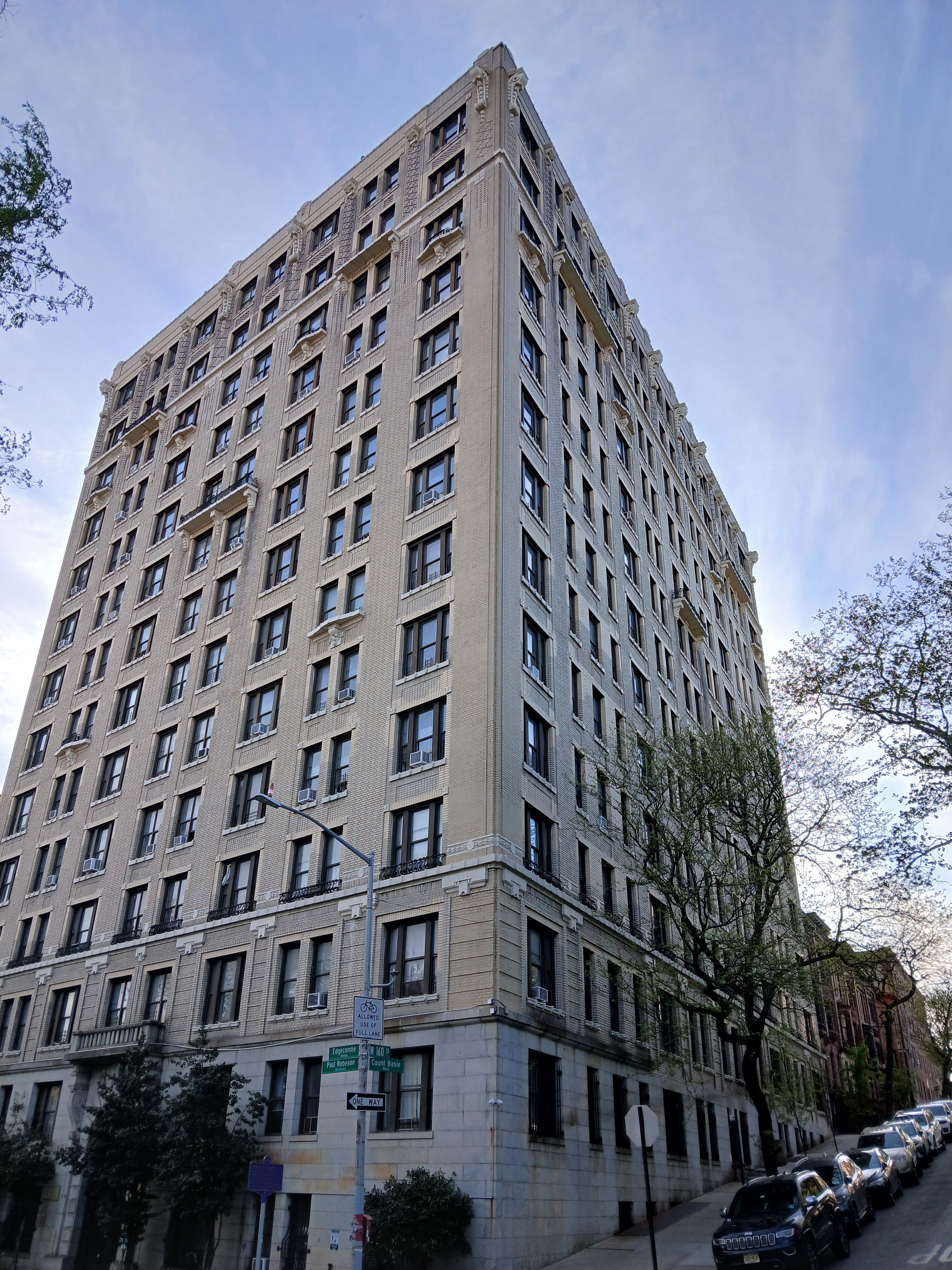
- The eastern facade seen from the north (2026)
- Interactive map of Paul Robeson Residence (555 Edgecombe Avenue)
- Location: 555 Edgecombe Avenue, Manhattan, New York City
- Coordinates: 40°50′02″N 73°56′20″W
- Built: 1914–16
- Architect: Schwartz & Gross
- Part of: Dominican Historic District (ID100011048)
- NRHP reference No.: 76001248
- NYSRHP No.: 06101.008335 (entire building), 06101.001762 (Paul Robeson's home specifically)
- NYCL No.: 1862

Significant dates
- Added to NRHP: December 8, 1976
- Designated NHL: December 8, 1976
- Designated CP: January 24, 2025
- Designated NYSRHP: June 23, 1980
- Designated NYCL: June 15, 1993

555 Edgecombe Avenue is an apartment building at the southwest corner of Edgecombe Avenue and 160th Street in the Washington Heights neighborhood of Manhattan in New York City, New York, U.S. Built between 1914 and 1916, it was originally known as the Roger Morris Apartments after the retired British Army officer who built the nearby Morris–Jumel Mansion, and was designed by Schwartz & Gross, who specialized in apartment buildings. The building was declared a National Historic Landmark under the name Paul Robeson Residence in 1976, and it became a New York City designated landmark in 1993.

The building has an exterior of brick and terracotta. It has twelve floors, plus a basement and a cellar that are visible on Edgecombe Avenue. The double-height main entrance in the cellar, on Edgecombe Avenue, is set in an arched opening with ironwork at its peak. When 555 Edgecombe Avenue opened, there were 105 apartments with a combined 479 rooms. Over the years, the building has been rearranged, with 127 or 128 apartments as of 2022.

Albert J. Schwarzler bought the site on the western side of Edgecombe Avenue, between 159th and 160th Street, in 1908. The structure, which opened in January 1916, occupies the northern half of Schwarzler's site. Initially, the building catered to mostly white tenants, who all moved out between 1938 and 1940 as more black residents moved into the neighborhood. Numerous African American figures moved into the building, including actor/singer Paul Robeson and musician Count Basie, for whom part of the adjoining section of Edgecombe Avenue is named. After Schwarzler died in 1941, the building was sold in 1943, then again to Daddy Grace in 1947. The building was sold twice more in 1960, after Grace's death, and was owned by Matthew Golson and his family from 1960 until 2022.

== Site ==
555 Edgecombe Avenue is at the southwest corner of Edgecombe Avenue and 160th Street in the Washington Heights neighborhood of Manhattan in New York City, New York, U.S. The trapezoidal land lot covers 13,926 square feet (1,294 m^{2}), with a frontage of 102.58 feet (31.27 m) and a depth of 150.42 feet (45.85 m). It has an alternate address of 400 East 160th Street. The building is near the top of Coogan's Bluff, a cliff on the western bank of the Harlem River, and faces the Morris–Jumel Mansion to the north and Highbridge Park to the east.

Although the building is five blocks north of the Sugar Hill Historic District, it is sometimes considered in Sugar Hill because of the building's high concentration of black residents. The intersection of Edgecombe Avenue and 160th Street is co-named "Paul Robeson Boulevard" and "Count Basie Place", after two notable residents. The street is co-named after Basie, while the avenue is co-named after Robeson. The building itself was frequently nicknamed "The Triple Nickel" because of its street address—in the United States, a nickel is worth five cents.

The site is part of the former estate of British Army colonel Roger Morris, who acquired land in Upper Manhattan in 1765 and built the Morris–Jumel Mansion at the top of Coogan's Bluff. The Morris family lived in the mansion until 1775, and the estate was occupied by the Continental Army, then by British and Hessian officers, during the American Revolutionary War. After the British evacuation of New York in 1783, the estate passed through multiple owners; the Jumel family bought the estate in 1810 and lived there for several decades. The Jumel estate had been split up by the end of the 19th century, and V. K. Stevenson bought the site of 555 Edgecombe Avenue at an auction in 1882. The construction of the New York City Subway's first line in 1904 spurred the development of row houses and apartment buildings in Washington Heights, which for the first time had easy access to Lower Manhattan.

== Architecture ==
The building was designed by Schwartz & Gross. It consists of twelve stories that are fully above ground, as well as a basement and cellar, which are one and two stories below the first floor, respectively. Due to the slope of the site, the basement and cellar are above ground level on Edgecombe Avenue. As such, the building's Edgecombe Avenue facade measures 14 stories high. The National Park Service (NPS) describes the building as thirteen stories high, plus the penthouse; an NPS report counts the basement as floor 1.

=== Facade ===
The facade is divided vertically into seven bays on its eastern elevation, facing Edgecombe Avenue, and thirteen bays on its northern elevation, facing 160th Street. The basement and cellar are clad with granite. The first through twelfth stories are clad with beige brick; the window sills, lintels, and band courses are made of terracotta. There are tripartite windows and double-hung windows on both elevations; the tripartite windows consist of a large central panel flanked by two narrower ones. The southern and western elevations are made of pale yellow brick with plain rectangular window openings. There is also a light court on the southern elevation.

Both the basement and cellar are visible on Edgecombe Avenue, but only the basement is visible on 160th Street, and the basement windows at the western end of the 160th Street elevation are almost entirely below ground. The middle bay of the Edgecombe Avenue elevation contains a double-height arch. Within the arch is a glass-and-iron double door, an iron transom bar with a Vitruvian scroll pattern, and a fanlight above the transom. The arch is surrounded by voussoirs at its top, with a keystone at the center that supports a balcony above. There are two console brackets flanking the arch, which also support the balcony on top. In addition, there are three bays of windows on either side of the central arch on Edgecombe Avenue; the cellar windows have iron grilles over them. On 160th Street is a service entrance.

Above the basement, a belt course runs horizontally across the facade. There is also a balcony with a balustrade at the first story. Some of the bricks on the first-story facade are laid in a rusticated pattern, and there are raised brick surrounds around each window. There is another belt course above the first story, with geometric brackets, roundels, and terracotta bands. Within each bay, there are spandrel panels above each window on the second to tenth stories, as well as terracotta rosettes at the top corners. There are wrought-iron balustrades in front of each window on the second story. On Edgecombe Avenue, the fifth and tenth stories have rounded balconies, while the eighth and eleventh stories have rectangular balconies; all of these balconies are made of terracotta and have iron railings. Similar balconies exist at these levels on 160th Street, except on the fifth story. At the tenth story, the bays are separated by raised brick bands, and there are terracotta foliate panels and a belt course above that story. The eleventh and twelfth stories have light and dark brick laid in a diaperwork pattern. There was formerly a cornice above the twelfth floor, which was supported by brackets. Some of the brackets on the Edgecombe Avenue elevation contain a cross motif, inset within a circle.

=== Interior ===
When 555 Edgecombe Avenue was completed, the main entrance led through the large arch on Edgecombe Avenue, into a lobby with two elevators and a stair to the upper floors. The lobby is decorated with plaster and marble, as well as relief panels with classical motifs. The decorations include motifs from Greek mythology, such as dancing goats and cherubs playing flutes. There is also a stained-glass skylight in the lobby's ceiling, designed in the Art Deco style, though it was covered up during the 1960s due to fears of nuclear bombings during the Cold War.

Initially, there were 105 apartments with a combined 479 rooms, including bathrooms. Each floor typically contained eight apartments. Servants lived in a group of 21 apartments on the top floor. These apartments have been rearranged over the years. For example, in the 1930s, a set of five-room apartments were divided up, while 19 servants' apartments were combined into five penthouse units. As of 2022, 555 Edgecombe Avenue had 127 or 128 apartments.

== History ==
=== Schwarzler operation ===
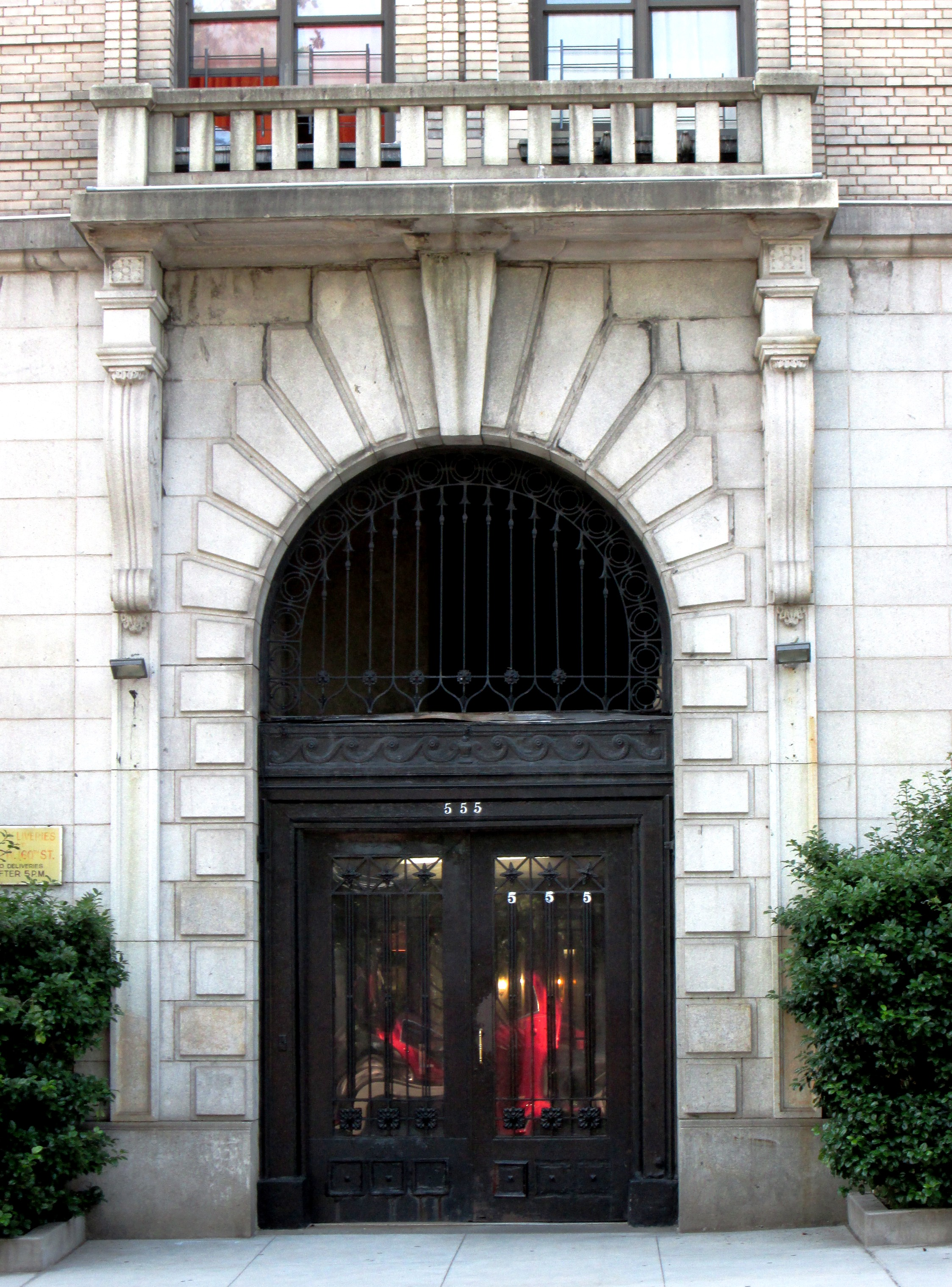
Entrance

In May 1908, contractor Albert J. Schwarzler bought ten land lots on the western side of Edgecombe Avenue from 159th to 160th Street, in exchange for two houses in the Bronx. Schwarzler hired the firm of Schwartz & Gross in 1910 to design a six-story apartment building on the southern half of the site, at 545 Edgecombe Avenue. Following the completion of 545 Edgecombe Avenue, he again hired the partners to design an apartment building immediately to the north. In May 1914, the firm filed plans for a 12-story apartment building at 555 Edgecombe Avenue, which would cost $500,000. The New York City Department of Buildings (DOB) refused to grant a construction permit for two weeks because of a dispute over the building's height. While the DOB had determined that the structure was 156 feet (48 m) tall with 15 stories, Schwartz & Gross cited the building as 133 feet (41 m) tall and that the basement was above ground because of the site's steep slope.

The structure—known as the Roger Morris Apartments, after the British Army soldier who once lived on the estate—was occupied by 1915. New York state census records from that year show that all residents were white; most residents were American-born, though there were also foreign-born residents from multiple European countries and Canada. The entire structure was completed in January 1916 and, at the time, was Washington Heights' tallest apartment building. Initially, infants were required to use a service entrance on 160th Street and a freight elevator, which prompted a lawsuit in 1916. The dispute was resolved when the New York Supreme Court ruled that infants should be allowed to use the main entrance on Edgecombe Avenue.

In 1925, Schwarzler took out a five-year, $450,000 first mortgage on the property from Quinlan & Leland, and in 1931, he took a second mortgage of $150,000 from the Bank of Manhattan Trust Company. Schwarzler defaulted on his first mortgage in August 1933, and the Union Square Savings Bank took over rent collection at the building. Schwarzler retained his ownership of the building and, in 1939, let many of the existing tenants' leases lapse. Telephone directories have entries for 83 families in 1938, of which only 17 remained in 1939 and none in 1940. By then, the surrounding area was becoming predominantly black, and 67 tenants, all of whom were likely black, were added to the telephone directories between 1939 and 1940. Schwarzler died in 1941. After Schwarzler's death, five of the eleven staff members were fired, and residents were forced to wait up to ten minutes for the only working elevator, prompting complaints from occupants. At the time, apartments with two and a half rooms rented for $50 a month, while larger five-room units rented for at least $80–90.

=== Later ownership ===
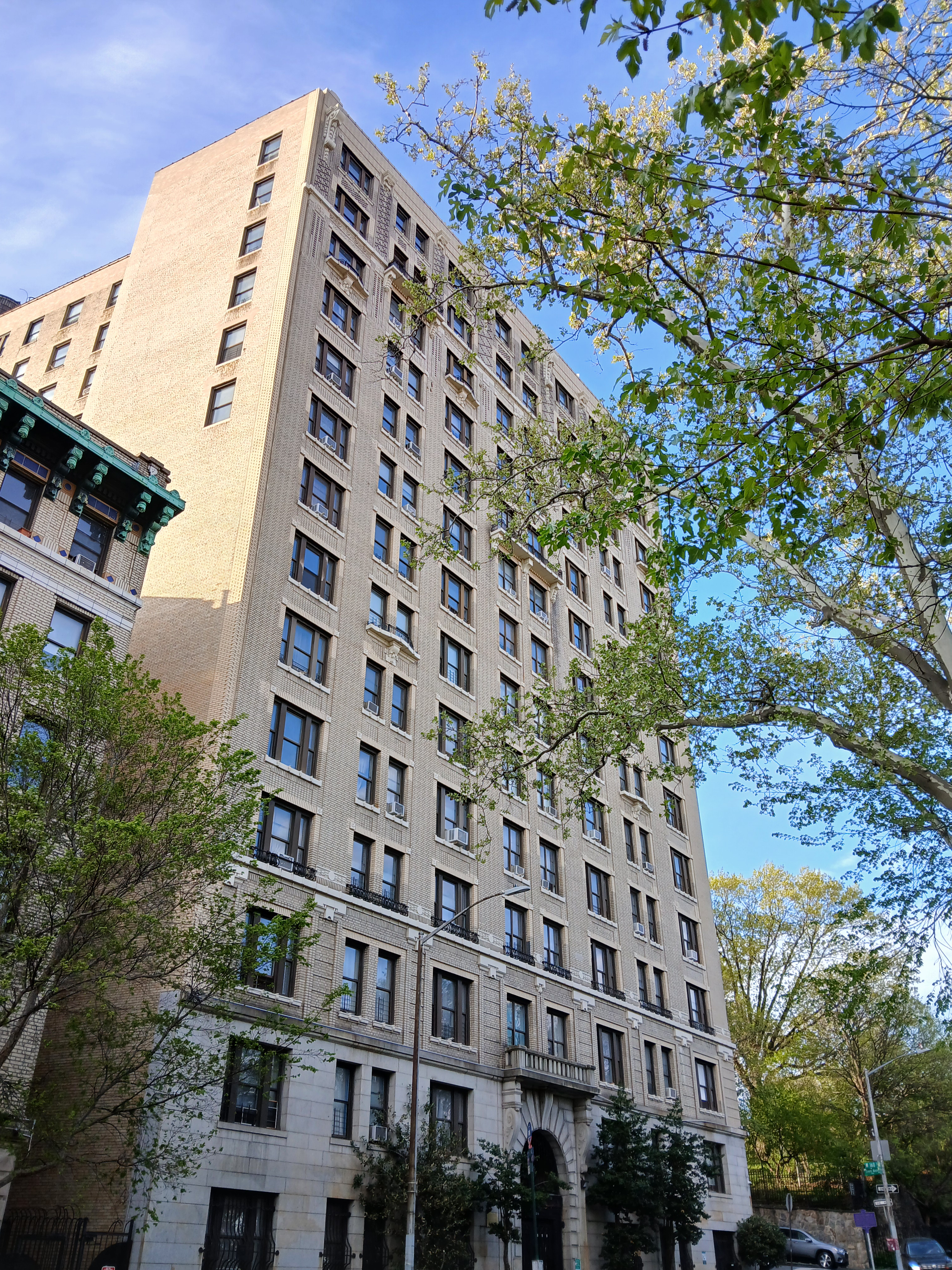
The eastern facade viewed from the southeast

In the mid-20th century, 555 Edgecombe Avenue and the nearby 409 Edgecombe Avenue were characterized as among Sugar Hill's "class houses", occupied by well-off residents. The Schwarzler estate sold 545 and 555 Edgecombe Avenue to a client of the brokers Darling & McDonald in 1943. The two structures had a combined value of $690,000, and number 555 had 128 apartments, with annual income of $100,000 from rent. Following the sale, 32 residents organized a rent strike, claiming that landlord Louis Demburg had interrupted their doorman service, heat, and hot water. In particular, residents claimed that resident manager Cecil Carter had reduced service and dismissed several staff members (including a doorman and elevator operators), even though the building charged some of the highest rents in the neighborhood. The owners eventually fired Carter and rehired the original manager, who restored the services that had been cut. Residents protested again in early 1947 when Demburg threatened to fire the manager; by then, the building was deteriorating, and residents alleged that Demburg refused to make the necessary repairs.

Roger Morris Inc. and the Louden Realty Corporation sold the building in August 1947 to the 555 Edgecombe Avenue Corporation, which took over a $414,000 mortgage on the property. At the time, the building was valued at $680,000. Daddy Grace, founder of the United House of Prayer For All People, was reported as having purchased both 545 and 555 Edgecombe Avenue. After workers went on strike in 1949, the striking staff claimed that Grace had his followers run the building's elevators. Grace still owned the building when he died in January 1960, and Alexander Gross of Eldorado Estates Ltd. announced in March 1960 that he had bought both 545 and 555 Edgecombe Avenue. He could not take ownership immediately because a federal court had to approve the sale. Gross finally took over the buildings at the beginning of May 1960, even as Grace's followers attempted to prevent the trustees of Grace's estate from cashing a $1.055 million check from the buyer. Gross took over an $183,000 loan on 555 Edgecombe Avenue.

Gross resold 545 and 555 Edgecombe Avenue in December 1960 to Matthew Golson, who paid cash and took over mortgage loans that had been placed on both buildings. A group of Grace's followers filed a lawsuit in 1961, stating that Grace's properties, including 545 and 555 Edgecombe Avenue and the El Dorado, should not have been sold. In 1976, the building was declared a National Historic Landmark for its cultural significance as the onetime residence of actor–singer Paul Robeson; the designation was granted under the name Paul Robeson Residence. By the 1980s, the building had been characterized as rundown, and one resident claimed that the apartments needed repairs and that tenants were falling victim to crimes. The building still had some notable tenants such as musician and bandleader Andy Kirk. The New York City Landmarks Preservation Commission (LPC) proposed designating 555 Edgecombe Avenue as a city landmark in 1991, and it granted landmark designation in 1993. One resident began performing regular jazz concerts in her apartment in the 1990s, which became popular among local musicians.

The corner of 160th Street and Edgecombe Avenue, outside the building, was co-named for jazz musician Count Basie and Paul Robeson in October 2009 following advocacy from the Harlem Historical Society and the Morris–Jumel Mansion's director. By the mid-2010s, the lobby was wearing down, and The New York Times wrote that the building looked like it "will sooner or later be consumed by the kind of gentrification that has already remade central Harlem". Matthew Golson attempted to sell the building for $65 million in 2017. A short documentary about 409 and 555 Edgecombe Avenue, In the Face of What We Remember, was released in 2018. After Golson died, the Harkham family bought the building in April 2022 for $26.7 million, just over two-fifths of the original asking price. The new owners planned to renovate the building.

== Notable residents ==
According to the LPC, 555 Edgecombe Avenue "never had as illustrious a tenant roster" as 409 Edgecombe Avenue did, and many occupants were middle-class African Americans who were not well known. Nonetheless, the building has had several notable African American residents, which in 2009 led the New York Daily News to say that the "Triple Nickel drew more African-American celebrities than any building ever could today". Because the building is across the street from the Morris–Jumel Mansion (where some of the U.S. Founding Fathers stayed or visited), one local resident called 555 Edgecombe Avenue "the crossroads where the founding fathers met the founding brothers".

Jazz figures, such as saxophonist Coleman Hawkins, trumpeter Erskine Hawkins, saxophonist Johnny Hodges, trombonist Snub Mosley, singer-songwriter Timmie Rogers, vocalist Maxine Sullivan, and trumpeter Cootie Williams lived in the building. Other notable residents included Count Basie, Andy Kirk, psychologist Kenneth Clark, composer Duke Ellington, writer Langston Hughes, writer/filmmaker Zora Neale Hurston, actress Lena Horne, actor/producer Canada Lee, boxer Joe Louis, U.S. Supreme Court justice Thurgood Marshall, baseball player Jackie Robinson, and actress Anne Wiggins Brown. Paul Robeson lived in the building for two years in the early 1940s (Note: Sources disagree on whether the family lived there in 1939–1941 or 1940–1942.) but was quoted in 1941 as having "never really liked New York for living".

== See also ==
- List of National Historic Landmarks in New York City
- List of New York City Designated Landmarks in Manhattan above 110th Street
- National Register of Historic Places listings in Manhattan above 110th Street
