= Preaching chords =

Musical chords used in Blues and gospel

Preaching Chords
- Stylistic origins: Gospel music; Traditional black gospel
- Cultural origins: Mid 1960s–early 1970s (United States)
- Typical instruments: piano; Hammond Organ; drums
- Derivative forms: Gospel Music; Traditional black gospel; Urban contemporary gospel

Other topics
- Shout band; Gospel music

Preaching chords are blues/gospel-inspired chords played on a Hammond organ or piano, and many times with a drum set as well, near the end of a pastor or minister's sermon to accentuate, emphasize, and respond to them in a musical way. Like the related tradition of sermonic "whooping" (pronounced like "hooping"), these chords are most often used in the Black Church and Pentecostal traditions.

== History ==
The exact origin of preaching chords being played in African American Baptist and Pentecostal churches is relatively unknown, but is mostly believed to have started in either the early or mid-20th Century, at a time when many African-American clergymen and pastors began preaching in a charismatic, musical call-and-response style. They would encourage their congregations to shout out vocal catchphrases (based on whatever they were preaching about) along with them as they preached their sermons.

Church musicians began playing different soul and blues music-inspired chords, chord progressions, and musical riffs on pianos and Hammond organs. These were improvised to imitate the voices of the preachers and the calls-and-responses of the congregations because it audibly sounded almost as if the preachers and congregations were singing. This type of call-and-response preaching is also colloquially referred to by many as "whooping [pronounced like 'hooping'] and hollering," or "hooting and hollering."

On October 20, 2010, CNN featured Baptist megachurch pastor E. Dewey Smith Jr., where he talked about this type of call-and-response preaching that he incorporates into his sermons and referred to it as "whooping"/"hooping," giving an explanation of its cultural significance to African-American Christianity and gospel music, saying,

"Hooping is delivering and celebrating the Gospel message of Jesus Christ in an exuberant, musical style with a call-and-response type of synergy...it's almost like an improvisation of Jazz music meeting Gospel music with a little bit of Blues and Soul."

Today, preaching chords have become a staple part of Baptist and Pentecostal musical worship, particularly in the Black Church tradition. They have also become a staple part of Traditional black gospel music and urban contemporary gospel music in the United States, and even in other countries as well where Black Gospel music and culture is prevalent among Black Christians, such as in different countries in sub-Saharan Africa and in Europe.
