= Get Happy (song) =

Song written by Harold Arlen and Ted Koehler

Song
- Published: 1930 by Remick Music
- Songwriter: Ted Koehler
- Composer: Harold Arlen

"Get Happy" is a song composed by Harold Arlen with lyrics written by Ted Koehler, the first of their many collaborations. Ruth Etting introduced the song in the 1930 stage musical The Nine-Fifteen Revue. The song expresses the gospel music theme of getting happy, an expression of religious ecstasy for salvation.

It is most associated with Judy Garland, who performed it in her last MGM film Summer Stock (1950) and in live concert performances throughout the rest of her life. The versions from Summer Stock finished at #61 in AFI's 100 Years...100 Songs survey of top tunes in American cinema. An instrumental, hot jazz arrangement of the song, performed by Abe Lyman's Brunswick Recording Orchestra, served as the original theme music for Warner Bros.' Merrie Melodies cartoons from 1931 to 1933.

Elvis Costello named his fourth studio album, released in 1980, after the song.

Hugh Laurie performed the song in an episode of House, along with Lisa Edelstein.

Joaquin Phoenix and Lady Gaga performed the song in the American musical thriller film Joker: Folie à Deux (2024). Lady Gaga released a solo cover version of the song on Harlequin (2024), her companion album to the film.
