= Shout (Black gospel music) =

Style of Gospel music

In Black gospel music, a shout (or praise break) is a kind of fast-paced composition accompanied by ecstatic dancing (and sometimes actual shouting). It is sometimes associated with "getting happy". Modern examples would include rhythmic organ playing, drum beats, and people joining in freely. These highlight both creativity and connectedness.

It is a form of worship/praise most often seen in the Black Church and in Pentecostal churches of any ethnic makeup, and can be celebratory, supplicatory, intercessory, or a combination thereof. These expressions are often viewed as both emotional and musical responses to spiritual presence. This connects people through rhythm and synced movements.

== History ==
The shout music tradition originated within the church music of the Black church, parts of which derive from the ring shout tradition of enslaved people from Central and West Africa. As these enslaved Africans, who were concentrated in the southeastern United States, incorporated Kongo shout traditions into their newfound Christianity, the black Christian shout tradition emerged—albeit not in all black churches or in every part of the country. In fact, in the North prior to the 1930s, many African-American Christians practiced a form of worship found in denominations such as Episcopal Churches and Methodist Churches, more similar to their white Christian neighbors.

Even so, after the dawn of the Azusa Street Revival and the rise of Pentecostalism in 1906, many African-American Christians began to incorporate more modern Charismatic Christian practices into their worship, including speaking in tongues and various other bodily anomalies said to be caused by the Holy Spirit. The shout tradition fit well into this framework and became ever more popular across the spectrum of Pentecostalism and, eventually, the larger charismatic Evangelical world. As time passed, the influence spread from church music to secular music. It influenced the rhythms found in genres like early rock and roll, soul, and funk. The 1959 the Isley Brothers released Shout!, which took influence from the gospel music. Church groups wrote into radio stations to request the song no longer be played.

As Southern black Christians migrated north in large numbers after the end of Reconstruction, they began to found churches of their own that had different styles of worship than the aforementioned Northern black churches. Soon, the center of power shifted in the direction of the newcomers, who in many represented a more authentically African-American (and lively) church experience. At the same time, a new form of black gospel music emerged, influenced both by the black spiritual tradition as well as the growing Pentecostal/Holiness movements. This eventually led to the high-energy, fast-paced shouts and praise breaks seen among contemporary practitioners.

It is common now for gospel recording artists to include shouts and praise breaks on their albums, either recorded in a studio or live during a recorded show. This has had an outsize influence on the spread (and musical structure) of the tradition in modern times, in addition to the popularity of videos on social media depicting the practice.

== Sound ==
=== Standard ===
There are many variations of this particular style of music. Twinkie Clark, chief executive writer, and arranger for the American gospel group The Clark Sisters is widely credited as the originator of the classic shout sound in contemporary gospel music. In its most standard form, shout music is characterized by very fast tempo, chromatic basslines and piano/organ chords, snare hits and hand claps on the upbeat of each beat. The organist typically plays dominant 7 chords while improvising over riffs, while the pianist typically plays counter rhythms to the established rhythmic structure.

Often bands will break into shout music at the end of a song or as a finale, or at a particularly high emotional point during a church service or sermon—often cued by the singer or speaker themselves. Shouts following a sermon often come at the end of an instance of "whooping".

The structure of African-American Church bands varies greatly, but all typically have a few basic instruments in common: a basic drum kit, bass guitar, and an organ and/or piano.

Shouts typically lack sheet music and can vary from less than one minute to as long as over an hour and may span many different songs. Usually there is an instrumentalist guiding the structure and flow musically, though standard shout music is often used as a bed for vocal riffing and calling out of exclamatory catch phrases or "shouts" (e.g. "Hallelujah!" or "Thank you, Lord!") by a singer or minister during the experience.

=== UHOP (brass-based) ===
The United House of Prayer For All People (UHOP), an African-American denomination founded in 1919 in Massachusetts, is particularly known for its shout bands and distinctive form of shout music: brass players, predominantly trombone-based, inspired by jazz, blues and Dixieland, gospel and old-time spirituals: a more soulful/spiritual version of a New Orleans brass band.

In this more brass-based type of shout music (less common in mainstream Black churches but often seen in parades, clubs, UHOP churches, and elsewhere), there are usually three sections: the recitive and call, which involves a musical statement from the trombones; the aria, which develops the melody and tempo; and the shout, the ending call-and-response. As the song progresses, the sound intensifies from a whisper at the beginning to an exuberant crescendo during the shout.

This kind of shout music is made to closely emulate the exact sound and techniques used by the voices of singers and choirs, including but not limited to vibratos, slurs, and glissando. This is the primary reason that a trombone is typically found as the lead instrument. Also common are baritones, a snare drum and bass drum combination, and a sousaphone. Though they are not usually seen, other instruments are also utilized in such shout bands, including trumpets, flugelhorns, saxophones, clarinets, flutes, washboards and more.

These specialized, brass-based shout bands are often mistaken for trad jazz bands due to similarities in instrumentation and style, and there are as many as eight different leaders controlling different aspects of the band. There is usually a player-conductor that controls everything that happens, but he or she is normally listening to the band as a whole whereas the other leaders are listening to specific parts that they are assigned to.

== Appearance ==
Shouts invariably involve dancing, typically featuring quick feet movements, undulation of the arms and upper body, and ecstatic exclamations—not unlike the more ancient ring shouts of West Africa. This may be performed by the congregation at large (including or led by any presiders), or by only a portion or even just one or a few person(s).

Church ushers or other participants often assist people dancing more vigorously, as they often have their eyes closed and might not be able to see obstacles in their way. (Others might simply be of older age and in need of physical support.) While it is common for participants to exit their church pew and dance in the aisles or elsewhere, others might support themselves using the pew while dancing.

Shouts are primarily expressions of religious enthusiasm, praise, and worship. They may also serve as expressions of communal joy and celebration.

For those not necessarily dancing, participation might simply be standing in place and clapping along with the beat.

== See also ==
- Ejaculatory prayer
- Shouting Methodists

== Examples ==
=== Standard ===
- Shout Music on organ with bass and drums
- Chris Edwards playing Shout Music on organ with a full band and choir

=== UHOP ===
- Sweet Heaven Kings Brass Band - United House of Prayer for All People - Anacostia, DC (The Kennedy Center)
- United House of Prayer Trombone Shout Bands - Smithsonian Folkways Recordings
