= Marcelino Manuel da Graça =

American bishop (1881/84–1960)

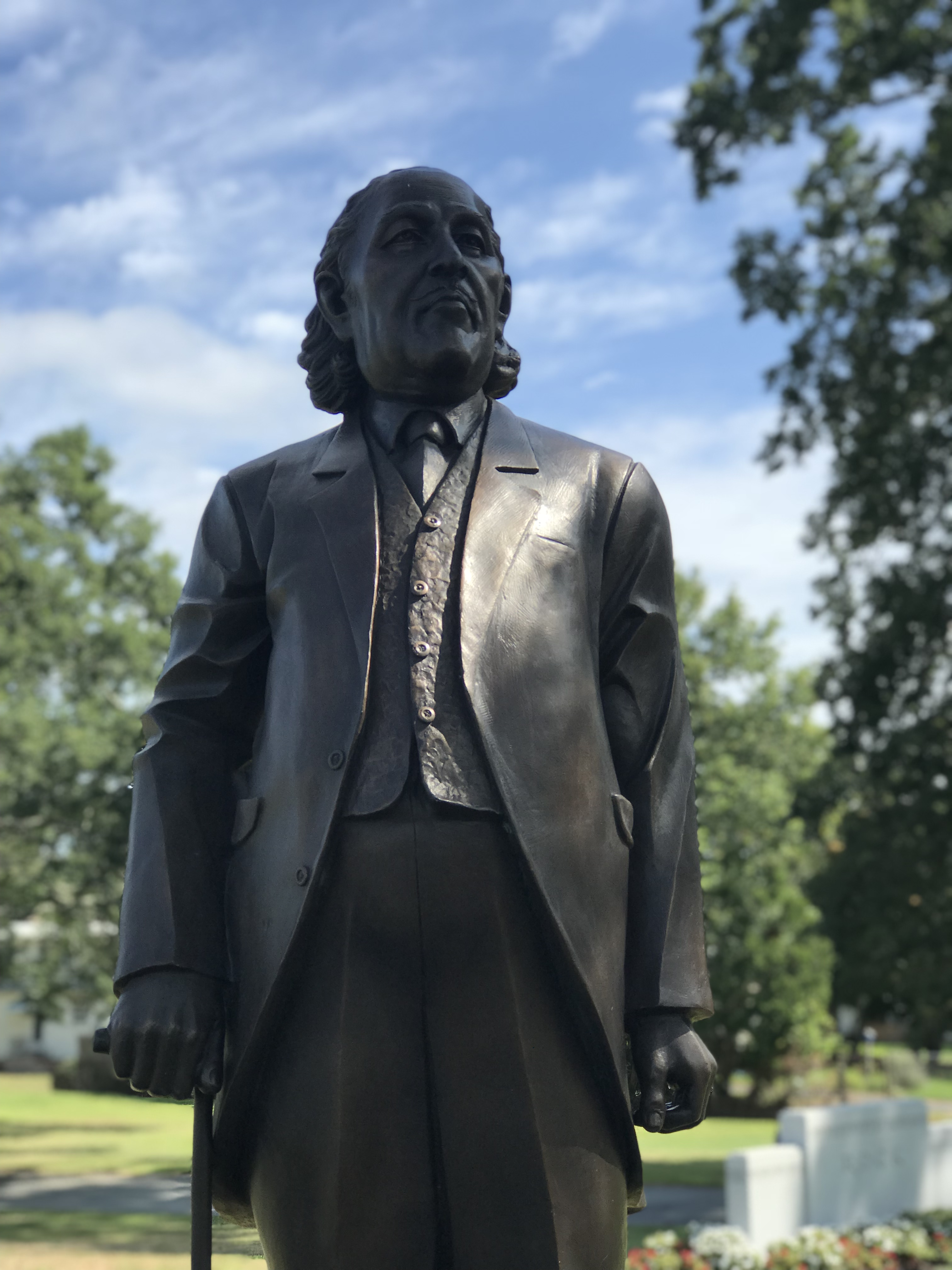
- Statue of Daddy Grace outside his mausoleum in New Bedford, Massachusetts.
- Born: January 25, 1881 or 1884; Brava, Portuguese Cape Verde
- Died: January 12, 1960 (aged 76 or 78); Los Angeles, California, U.S.
- Other names: Bishop Grace, Sweet Daddy Grace
- Occupation: Bishop
- Known for: Founder of the United House of Prayer For All People of the Church on the Rock of the Apostolic Faith

Marcelino Manuel da Graça (January 25, 1881 or 1884—January 12, 1960), also known as Charles Manuel "Sweet Daddy" Grace, or Daddy Grace, was the founder and first bishop of the predominantly African-American denomination, the United House of Prayer For All People. He was a contemporary of other religious leaders such as Father Divine, Noble Drew Ali, and Ernest Holmes. Many of his followers claimed miraculous acts of faith healing while attending services and others saw his ministry as a sign from God of the imminent return of Jesus Christ.

== Origins and family ==
Marcelino Manuel da Graça's parents were Manuel (1837–1926) and Gertrude (1847–1933) da Graça. Marcelino da Graça's had five siblings, consisting of one brother, Benventura, and four sisters: Eugenia, Slyvia, Amalia, and Louise. He was born January 25, in Brava in the Cape Verde Islands, then a Portuguese possession off the west coast of Africa. There is no verifiable information to confirm Grace's exact birth year, but most sources either state 1881 or 1884. The family Marcelino's father Manuel da Graça arrived in Massachusetts aboard a ship called the Freeman in May 1902. It is unclear whether Marcelino was aboard the ship in 1902, but ship manifests show that he visited America in 1903, and in 1904 he came as a cabin passenger aboard the schooner called Luiza.

Marcelino Grace married twice. His first wife was Jane "Jennie" Lomba, a Cape Verdean woman also known as Jennie Lombard. They were married in 1909. They had a daughter, Irene, in 1910 and son, Norman in 1912. Norman died in 1947. Whether they officially divorced was disputed. His second wife was named Angelina (Montano) Grace, a woman of Mexican descent, whom he married in 1932. They had a son, Marcelino, in 1935. They divorced in 1937.

In her book Daddy Grace, Marie W. Dallam notes that the entire da Graça family were Roman Catholics in their homeland and opened up to different forms of the Christian experience once they immigrated to the United States.

Benventura da Graça would later become a Church of the Nazarene pastor in the U.S. Marcelino, however, was said inside the da Graça family (according to the research done by Dallam) to have always been a "special child". Unlike the conventional ministry of his brother, he went on to establish an independent Christian ministry. After becoming a famous bishop, it was recounted that as a youth he had received a commission to preach directly from God.

== United House of Prayer ==
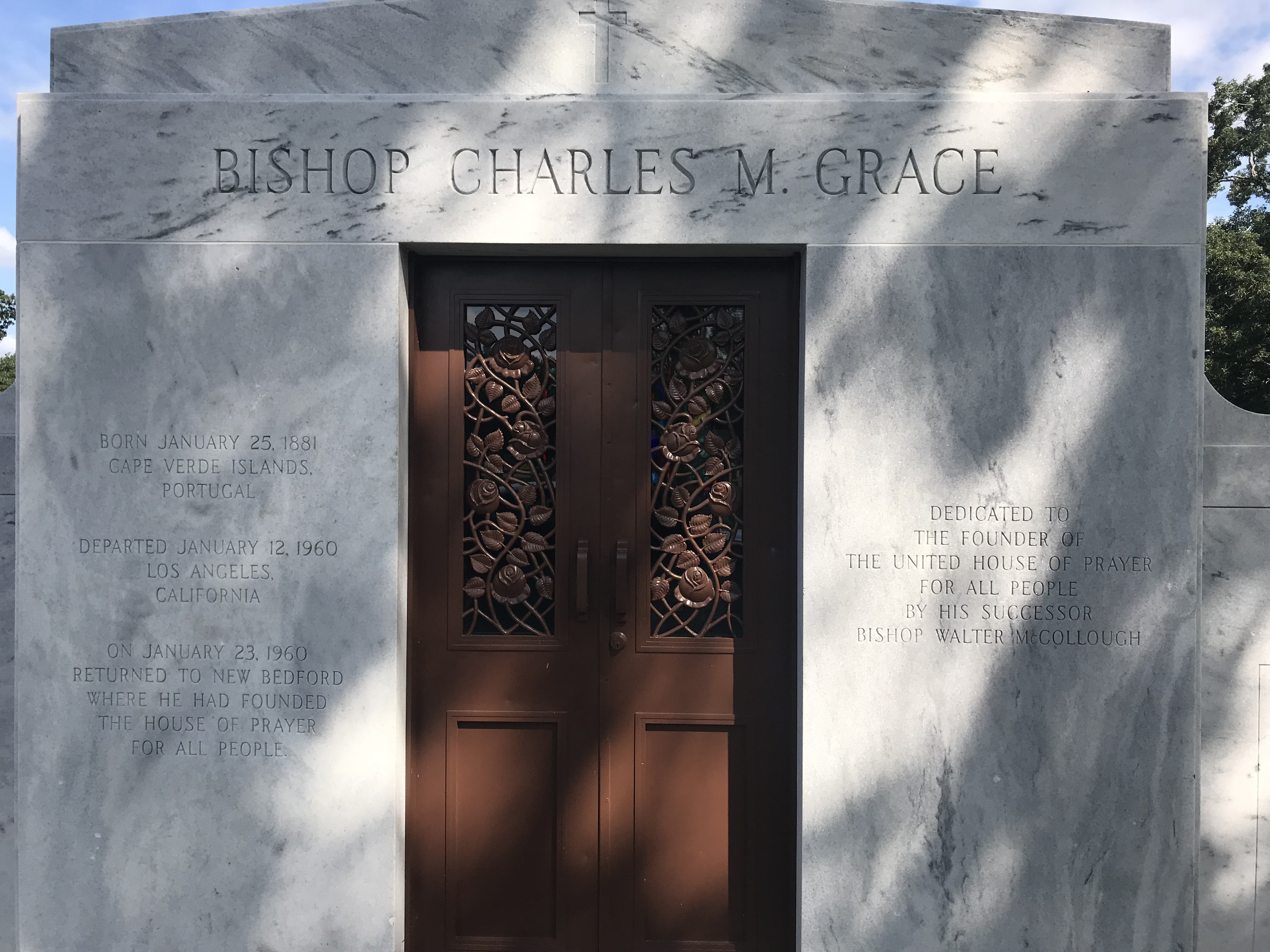
Entrance to the Mausoleum of Sweet Daddy Grace

After leaving his job as a railway cook, Marcelino, using the anglicized version of his name, Charles Manuel (Emmanuel) Grace, began using the title "Bishop". In 1919, he built the first House of Prayer in a tent in West Wareham, Massachusetts at the cost of $39. He later established branches valued at $1000 in Charlotte, North Carolina and Newark, New Jersey. Throughout the 1920s and 1930s, Bishop Grace traveled America preaching and establishing the United House of Prayer for All People. The Constitution and By-Laws of The United House of Prayer, promulgated in 1929, stated that the purpose of the organization in pertinent part was "to erect and maintain places of worship and assembly where all people may gather prayer and to worship the Almighty God, irrespective of denomination or creed." He traveled extensively throughout the segregated South in the 1920s and 1930s preaching to integrated congregations years before the civil rights struggles of the 1950s and 1960s and the religious ecumenical movements which followed.

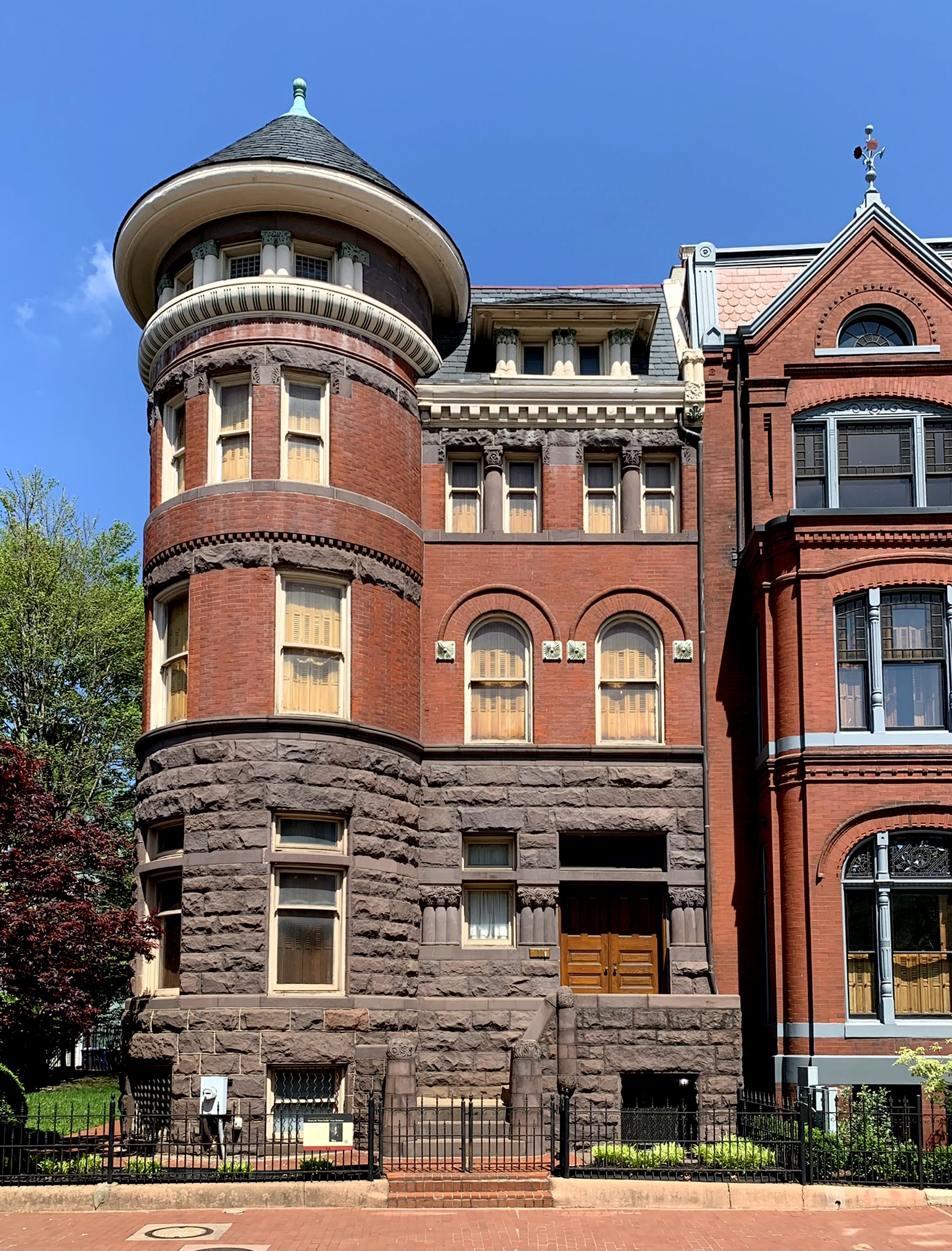
The longtime residence of Grace at 11 Logan Circle, Washington, D.C.

=== Faith-healing savior ===
For Bishop Grace and his followers the miraculous stories as told of the Apostles in the New Testament of the Bible did not end with their deaths. Grace asserted that such miracles were available again, through him. As "Daddy Grace", the bishop and leader of the United House of Prayer, he was well known and respected by his followers as a faith healer and miracle worker.

Grace also claimed that by the power of the Holy Ghost he could raise the dead, which he claimed he did to his younger sister Jeannie (Eugenia), who reportedly died and was raised again by Grace. She would accompany Grace in his missionary tours and testify to the fact.

=== Style ===
Grace was an early prototype of what is now understood in western culture as the "celebrity preacher". Active during the early and mid-20th century, Grace used attention-getting maneuvers such as wearing loudly colored suits with bold, different-colored piping and shiny buttons, along with glitzy, expensive jewelry and long, unpainted fingernails.

=== Businesses ===
Grace's business acumen was evident in the many properties he acquired, including the Grace Hotel and a $450,000 85-room mansion in Los Angeles, the Manhattan El Dorado apartments valued at $15,000,000 in 1953, 555 Edgecombe Avenue in 1947; businesses he owned such as a hatchery in Havana, Cuba and a Brazilian coffee plantation; and products he sold at his churches like Grace Coffee and Grace Cold Cream beauty products. He was worth $25 million when he died, though the Internal Revenue Service sought $4.5 million in back taxes from his estate.

=== Legacy and followers ===
The most notable organizational outcome of the 40-year ministry of Bishop Grace in the United States of America is the religious denomination known as the United House of Prayer For All People. It had 3,000,000 members in over 350 houses of prayer and 60 cities in 1960. Each successive leader/Bishop of the United House of Prayer for All People continues in the one-man leadership style initiated by Bishop Grace and each successive Bishop is called "Daddy" in turn.

Besides the United House of Prayer for All People, other U.S. denominations also trace their origins to the ministry of Bishop Grace. Prominent among them is the New York City-based "House of the Lord Pentecostal Church on the Mount".

== Death ==
Bishop Grace died on January 12, 1960 in Los Angeles following a heart attack and a stroke. His followers were unaware he had been suffering for ten years from a heart condition. His glass-topped bronze coffin was displayed for viewing in Charlotte, Newport News, Washington D.C., Philadelphia, and Newark.

== See also ==
- United House of Prayer for All People
- Religion in Black America
