= The El Dorado =

Residential skyscraper in Manhattan, New York

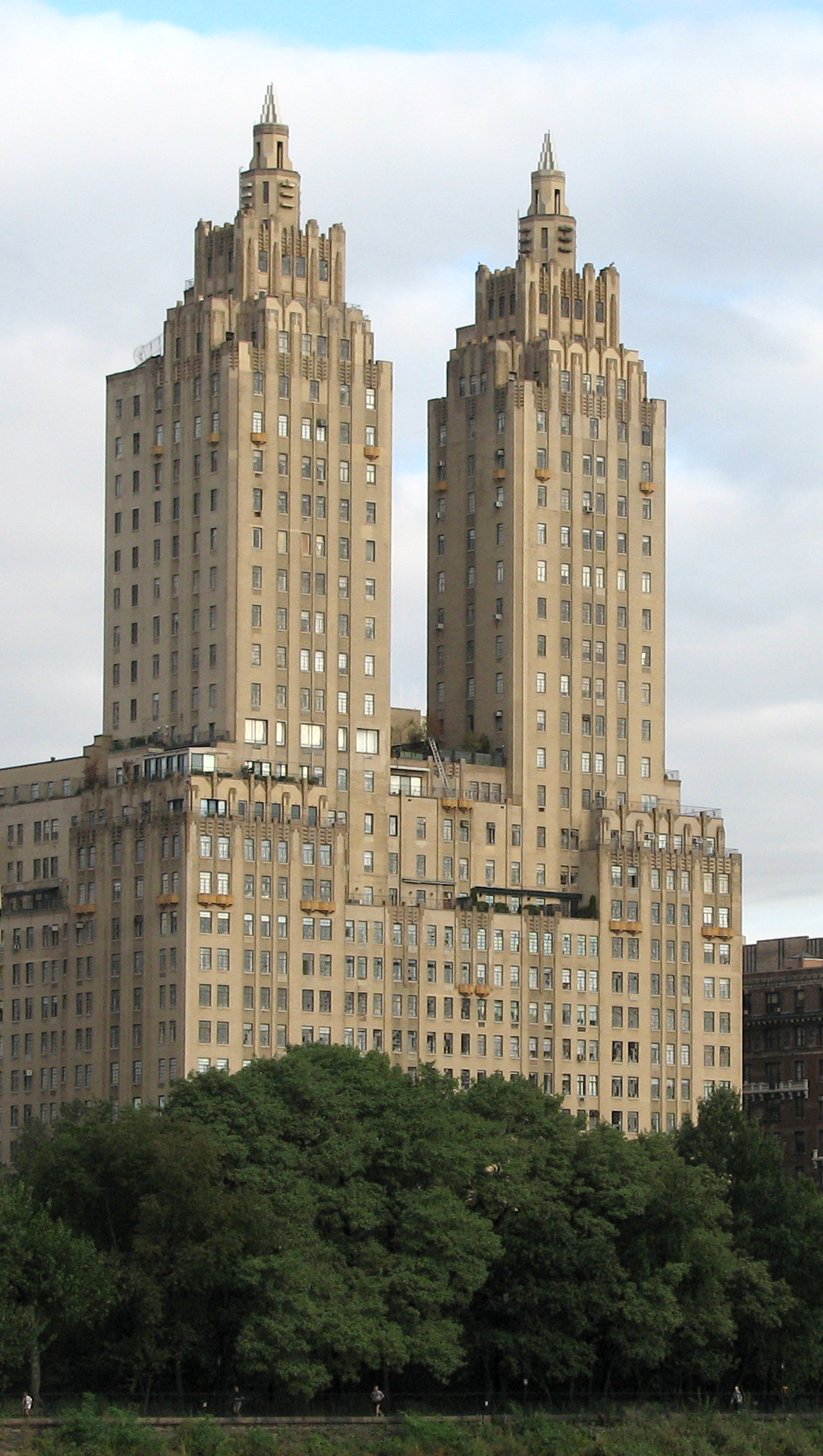
- View from the southeast
- Interactive map of the The El Dorado area
- Alternative names: The Eldorado

General information
- Type: Housing cooperative
- Architectural style: Art Deco
- Location: 300 Central Park West, Manhattan, New York, United States
- Coordinates: 40°47′18″N 73°58′03″W
- Construction started: 1929
- Completed: 1931–1932

Height
- Height: 391 ft (119 m)

Technical details
- Structural system: Steel superstructure
- Floor count: 29

Design and construction
- Architect: Emery Roth
- Architecture firm: Margon & Holder
- Main contractor: Elkay Builders Corp.
- The Eldorado
- U.S. Historic district – Contributing property
- New York City Landmark
- Part of: Central Park West Historic District (ID82001189)
- NYCL No.: 1521

Significant dates
- Designated CP: November 9, 1982
- Designated NYCL: July 9, 1985

The El Dorado (also spelled the Eldorado) is a cooperative apartment building at 300 Central Park West, between 90th and 91st Streets adjacent to Central Park, on the Upper West Side of Manhattan in New York City, United States. It was constructed from 1929 to 1931 and was designed by architect of record Margon & Holder and consulting architect Emery Roth in the Art Deco style. The El Dorado consists of twin 12-story towers rising from a 17-story base. The building is a contributing property to the Central Park West Historic District, a National Register of Historic Places–listed district, and is a New York City designated landmark.

The base contains several small setbacks, and two towers rise from the eastern side of the base. On Central Park West, the first three stories are clad in cast stone, and the main entrance consists of three angular bronze archways. The remainder of the facade is made of tan and brown brick, which are arranged to emphasize the vertical lines of the facade. Some of the upper-story apartments contain angular stone balconies, and the tops of the towers are ornamented with sculpted finials. When the El Dorado opened, it contained 200 apartments with 1,500 rooms, though some apartments have since been split or combined. The main lobby is decorated in marble, and a gym in the building's two basement levels was added in the 1990s.

The El Dorado replaced a pair of apartments that were built in 1902 and also known as the El Dorado. The current apartment complex was constructed from 1929 to 1931 by developer Louis Klosk, who was unable to complete the building after the Wall Street Crash of 1929. The Central Park Plaza Corporation bought the El Dorado at a foreclosure auction in 1931. The corporation was taken over by the Pick Hotels Corporation in 1943, then by Hugh K. McGovern in January 1953. The building was then sold in May 1953 to pastor Charles M. "Daddy" Grace, whose estate sold the building in 1960 to Alexander Gross. The El Dorado became a housing cooperative in July 1982, and several parts of the building were upgraded, despite disagreement among tenants.

== Site ==
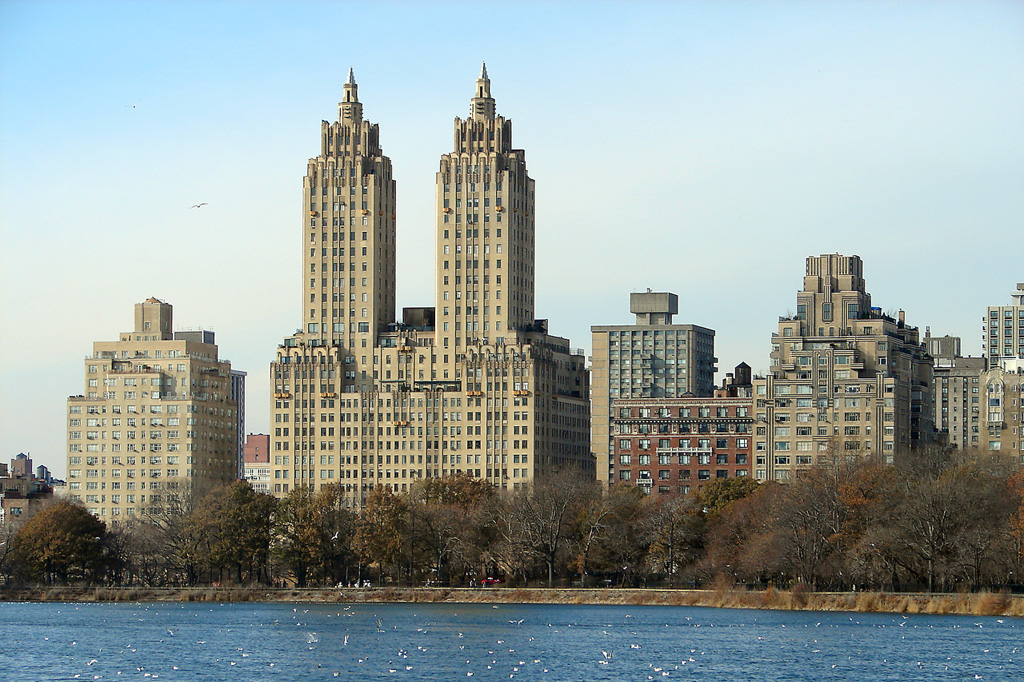
The El Dorado as seen across Jacqueline Kennedy Onassis Reservoir in Central Park

The El Dorado Apartments (also spelled Eldorado) is at 300 Central Park West on the Upper West Side neighborhood of Manhattan in New York City, United States. The building occupies the western sidewalk of Central Park West (formerly Eighth Avenue) between 90th Street to the south and 91st Street to the north. The El Dorado Apartments occupies a nearly square land lot with an area of 39,765 ft^{2} (3,694.3 m^{2}). The site has a frontage of 200 ft (61 m) on Central Park West and 90th Street and 194 ft (59 m) on 91st Street. It is directly across from the Jacqueline Kennedy Onassis Reservoir in Central Park to the east.

The El Dorado is one of several apartment buildings on Central Park West that are primarily identified by an official name. Even though a street address was sufficient to identify these apartment buildings, this trend followed a British practice of giving names to buildings without addresses. By contrast, buildings on Fifth Avenue, along the eastern side of Central Park, are mainly known by their addresses. Christopher Gray of The New York Times described the El Dorado as one of several apartment buildings in Manhattan with a "glitzy" name. The El Dorado's name is derived directly from a previous building on the site.

=== Previous structure ===
The construction of Central Park in the 1860s spurred construction on the Upper East Side of Manhattan, but similar development on the Upper West Side was slower to come. Major developments on the West Side were erected after the Ninth Avenue elevated line opened in 1879, providing direct access to Lower Manhattan. The first large apartment building in the area was the Dakota, which opened in 1884. The city installed power lines on Central Park West at the end of the 19th century, thus allowing the construction of multi-story apartment hotels with elevators.

Among these early apartment hotels was the original El Dorado between 90th and 91st Street. The original El Dorado, an eight-story apartment complex completed in 1902, was designed by Neville & Bagge and developed by John Signell. It was composed of two separate structures that collectively contained 50 apartments, each with four to fifteen rooms. There was also a garage, a charging station for early electric cars, and exterior turrets. Though the New-York Tribune dubbed the old El Dorado as "the most notable apartment house on Central Park", The New York Times said it much resembled the typical "moderate-rent apartment house".

== Architecture ==
The current El Dorado was developed from 1929 to 1931 by Louis Klosk. The firm of Margon & Holder was the architect of record for the building, while Emery Roth was the consulting architect. Irving Margon and Adolph M. Holder were relatively obscure architects, but they are known to have collaborated from 1928 to 1932, designing apartment buildings in Manhattan and the Bronx. Roth had experience in designing larger apartment buildings, such as the San Remo on Central Park West. Roth drew up the early plans, which depict a Classical Revival building, while Margon & Holder were responsible for the building's Art Deco details. The El Dorado, along with the Century, 55 Central Park West, the Majestic, 241 Central Park West, and the Ardsley, constitute a major grouping of Art Deco buildings on Central Park West.

=== Form and facade ===
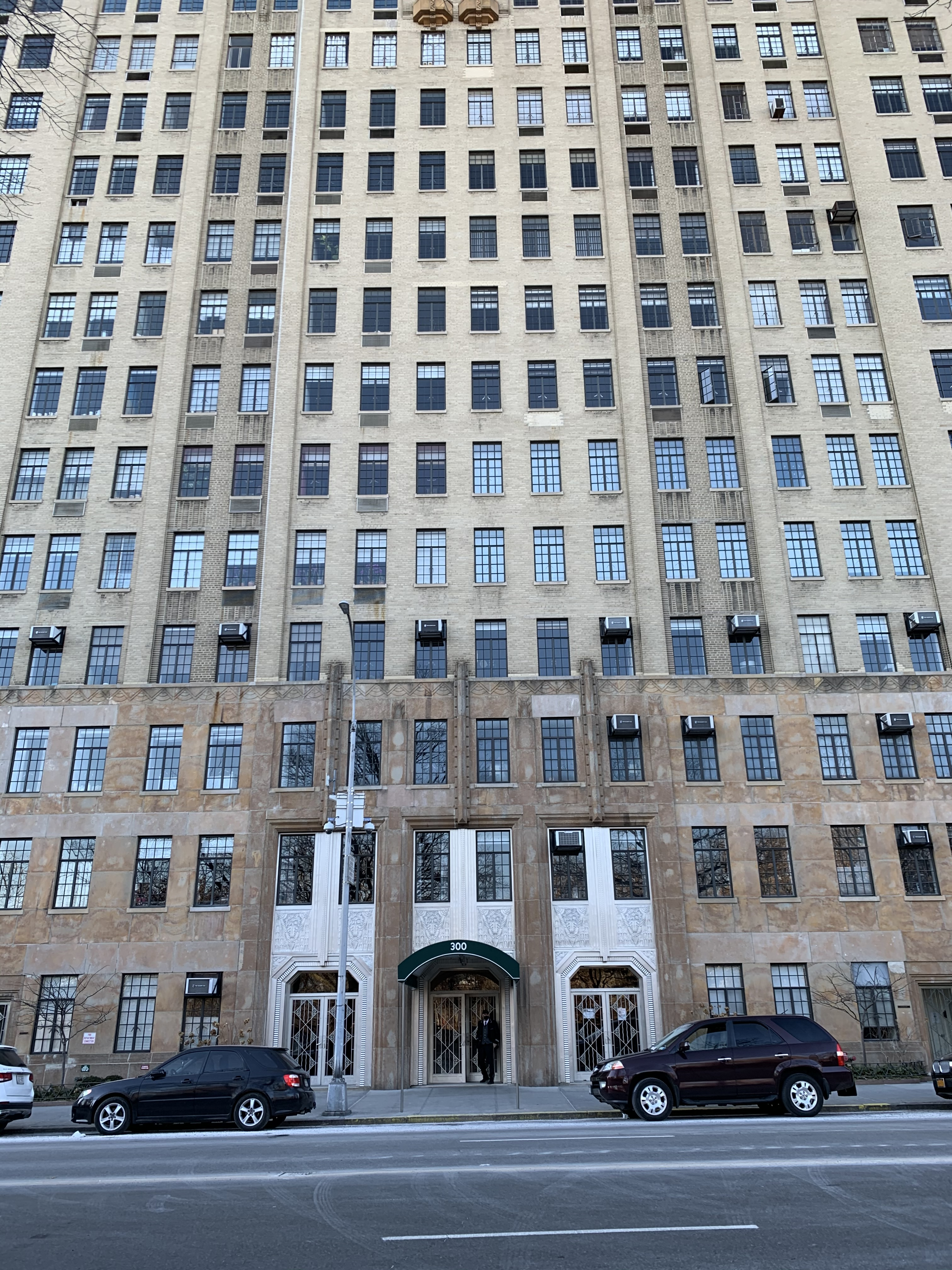
Lower stories of the main elevation on Central Park West

The El Dorado is 391 ft (119 m) tall. The base is 17 stories high, and two 12-story towers rise from the eastern portion of the base. The El Dorado is one of four buildings on Central Park West with a twin-towered form; the others are the Century, the Majestic, and the San Remo. (Note: The New York Times also characterizes the Beresford as having twin towers. However, the structure actually has three relatively short, octagonal pinnacles.) The massing of the El Dorado and similar buildings was shaped primarily by the Multiple Dwelling Act of 1929. Under this legislation, the "street walls" of apartment buildings could rise one and a half times the width of the adjacent street before they had to set back. On lots of more than 25,000 ft^{2} (2,300 m^{2}), the street walls could rise three times the width of the adjacent street. In practice, this meant that buildings on Central Park West could rise 19 stories before setting back. By splitting the upper stories into twin towers, as opposed to a single bulky tower, the developers could increase the amount of space that was near a window.

The Central Park West elevation of the facade is symmetrical and is divided vertically into bays; there is one window per floor on each bay. The lowest three stories of the Central Park West elevation contain a yellow facade of cast stone. Above the third story is a frieze of inverted arches and chevrons. Along the north and south elevations, the cast stone base is mostly one story high, except the easternmost seven bays, which are three stories high and designed similarly to the Central Park West elevation. The remaining stories are largely clad in tan brick, though the facade is also trimmed with yellow terracotta and light-brown brick. The facade remains largely in its original condition except for some window replacements.

==== Base ====
Most of the ground floor contains windows and doors that lead to professional apartments there. The doors have Art Deco-style curved railings. The main entrance on Central Park West contains three angled bronze arches at ground level, each of which corresponds to two bays. The spandrels above the arches, between the ground and second stories, are decorated with geometric patterns and motifs of birds. On the second story, there are two windows above each arch, or six in total, separated vertically by a stepped bronze pier with an incised geometric pattern. On the third story, there are three cast-stone piers at the center of the facade, which correspond directly to the bronze piers below them. Additionally, service entrances with Art Deco designs are placed on the westernmost end of the 90th and 91st Street frontages.

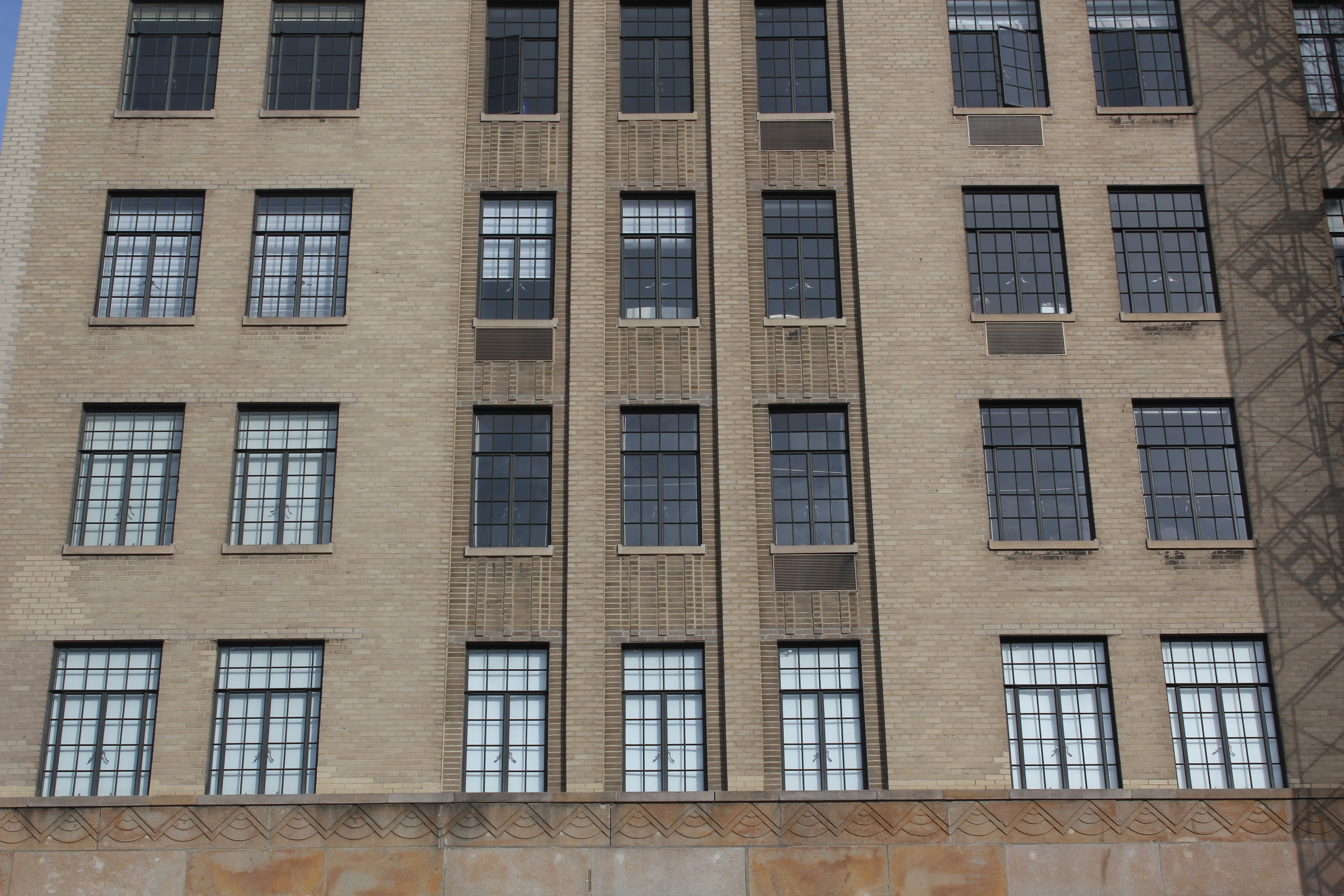
Windows in the outermost, second-outermost and third-outermost sections from left to right

Above the ground story, the Central Park West elevation is divided into eleven groupings of bays from south to north. The central grouping is six bays wide and flanked by alternating groupings of two and three bays. (Note: The groupings are in a 2-3-2-3-2-6-2-3-2-3 pattern. The outermost, third-outermost, and fifth-outermost groupings have 2 bays each. The second-outermost and fourth-outermost groupings have 3 bays each.) Above the 3rd story are several groupings of brown-brick bays (flush with the rest of the facade) and projecting tan-brick bays, as well as projecting tan-brick piers that separate different groupings. These design elements emphasize the vertical dimension of the facade. Within the brown-brick bays, the windows on different floors are separated by spandrels with vertical brick bands. (Note: On each side, the outermost and third-outermost groupings project slightly from the facade. The inner five groupings, as well as each individual bay in the second-outermost groupings, are separated vertically by projecting tan-brick piers. The second-outermost and fifth-outermost groupings are faced in brown brick. Hence, from south to north, the Central Park West elevation is arranged as follows: 2 bays of tan brick, projecting from the facade; balconies at 15th story; set back at 16th and 17th stories; 3 bays of brown brick, separated by projecting tan-brick piers; set back at 16th and 17th stories; 2 bays of tan brick, projecting from the facade; balconies at 15th story; set back at 16th and 17th stories; 3 bays of tan brick; set back at 14th story; 2 bays of brown brick; set back at 14th story; 6 bays of tan brick; balconies in center two bays at 13th story; set back at 14th and 16th stories; 2 bays of brown brick; set back at 14th story; 3 bays of tan brick; set back at 14th story; 2 bays of tan brick, projecting from the facade; balconies at 15th story; set back at 16th and 17th stories; 3 bays of brown brick, separated by projecting tan-brick piers; set back at 16th and 17th stories; 2 bays of tan brick, projecting from the facade; balconies at 15th story; set back at 16th and 17th stories) Each window is divided into three sections: a pair of movable casement windows, above which is a stationary transom window. On the north and south elevations, the third- and fourth-easternmost bays are clad with brown brick, while the rest of the facade is made of tan brick.

At the 13th story, the two middle bays contain angular stone balconies, which are supported by stone corbels and decorated with chevrons. There are similar angled stone balconies in the outer section of the 15th story. (Note: The 15th-floor balconies correspond to the 1st, 2nd, 6th, and 7th outermost bays on either end.) The five central groupings are set back above the 14th floor, forming a balcony with an Art Deco balustrade. The six outermost groupings are set back above the 16th and 17th floors, and the center six bays are also set back above the 16th floor; these all contain Art Deco balustrades. Above the brown-brick bays, the setbacks are decorated with geometric patterns such as chevrons and diaper patterns.

==== Towers ====
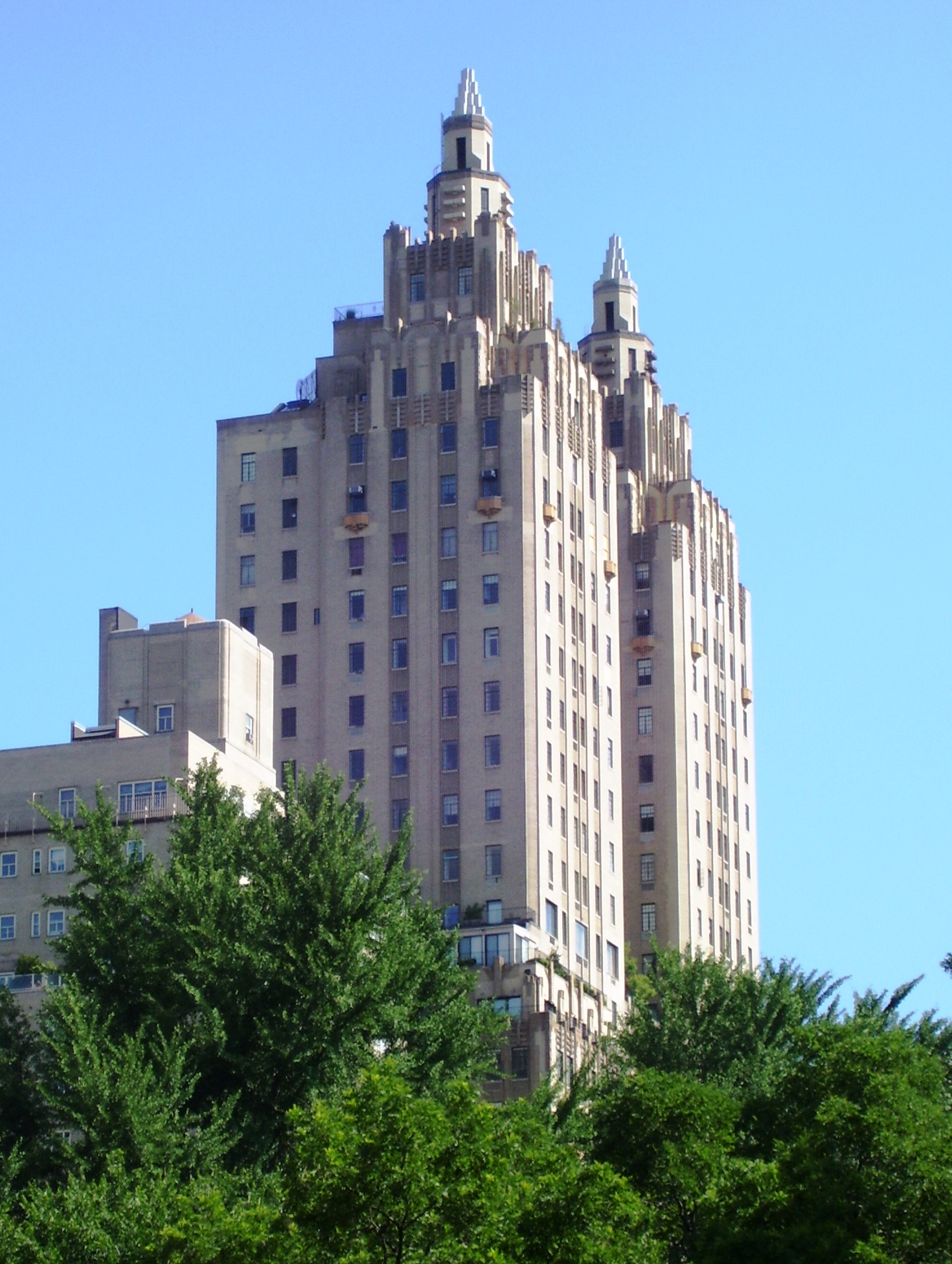
Tops of the towers as seen from the south

Above the 17th story rise the towers, which are largely clad in tan brick. On Central Park West, the towers are each six bays wide, though the four middle bays have brown-brick spandrels; the other elevations of the towers are decorated similarly. There are terracotta balconies on the 26th story facing Central Park West. The windows on the 27th and 28th stories are decorated with terracotta panels. The corners of each tower are set back slightly above the 27th story, and the remainder of each tower is set back above the 28th story. The top two stories of each tower are penthouse apartments. However, only the south tower's top is habitable, featuring a two-floor, dual-terraced penthouse. The top of the north tower houses a water tank, but the floors beneath are habitable.

The top of each tower contains finials above the 30th story, giving the pinnacles a stepped profile. According to Robert A. M. Stern, the pinnacles are shaped like belfries, which can be seen from Fifth Avenue across Central Park. Roth was responsible for the painted metal finials. The pinnacles were visible from New Jersey to the west, Long Island to the east, and Westchester to the north.

=== Features ===
As of 2022, the New York City Department of City Planning cites the El Dorado as having 204 residential apartments and 4 non-residential units. When the El Dorado opened, it contained 200 apartments with a total of 1,500 rooms between them. News articles from 1943 described the building as having 220 unfurnished apartments, each of which had three to twelve rooms. When the building was sold in 1953, it was described as containing 1,310 rooms across 216 apartments. According to a 1986 book by Steven Ruttenbaum, there were 186 apartments with a total of 1,300 rooms. Each of the lower stories had 11 apartments with three to twelve rooms per suite, and most units occupied a single level (as opposed to double-level duplexes). Most units consisted of five to eight rooms; while some suites had twelve rooms, they were outnumbered by those with three or four rooms. In the tower sections, there was one apartment per story, each with eight rooms.

The El Dorado was generally marketed to a less wealthy population than other buildings on Central Park West, such as the Beresford and San Remo. Many apartments did not have servants' rooms. Even the modernistic Art Deco design was intended to appeal to "new money" residents, as opposed to the classical designs of the Beresford and San Remo, where many residents were of "old money" wealth. A 1953 article described the building as also having 675 bathrooms and 13 elevators. The elevators were grouped into five cores; this minimized the need for public corridors except on the ground floor. Many of the units had wood-burning fireplaces and 29 apartments also had outdoor terraces. Some of the original units have since been combined. In the mid-1990s, one of the towers' spires contained a four-story apartment, while the other contained a water tank.

The main lobby was originally decorated in marble. Documents indicate that the lobby contained three murals, which depicted the concept of a high-rise skyline as a "type of promised land", according to Joseph Giovannini of The New York Times. According to a 1953 news article, the main lobby was decorated with murals, statues, and 14-karat gold decorations and friezes. In addition, there were alcoves throughout the lobby. At some point in the 20th century, the lobby was covered in wallpaper and repainted to resemble marble. The original design was restored in the early 1980s. The El Dorado also contains a community center and athletic facility in its two basement levels. There is a community room, which is free for residents to use, as well as a mini basketball court and a gymnasium, which residents pay a one-time fee to use.

== History ==
By the late 1920s, high-rise apartment buildings were being developed on Central Park West in anticipation of the completion of the New York City Subway's Eighth Avenue Line, which opened in 1932. Central Park West was concurrently widened from 48 to 63 ft (15 to 19 m). Under the Multiple Dwelling Act of 1929, this allowed the construction of proportionally taller buildings on the avenue.

=== Development ===
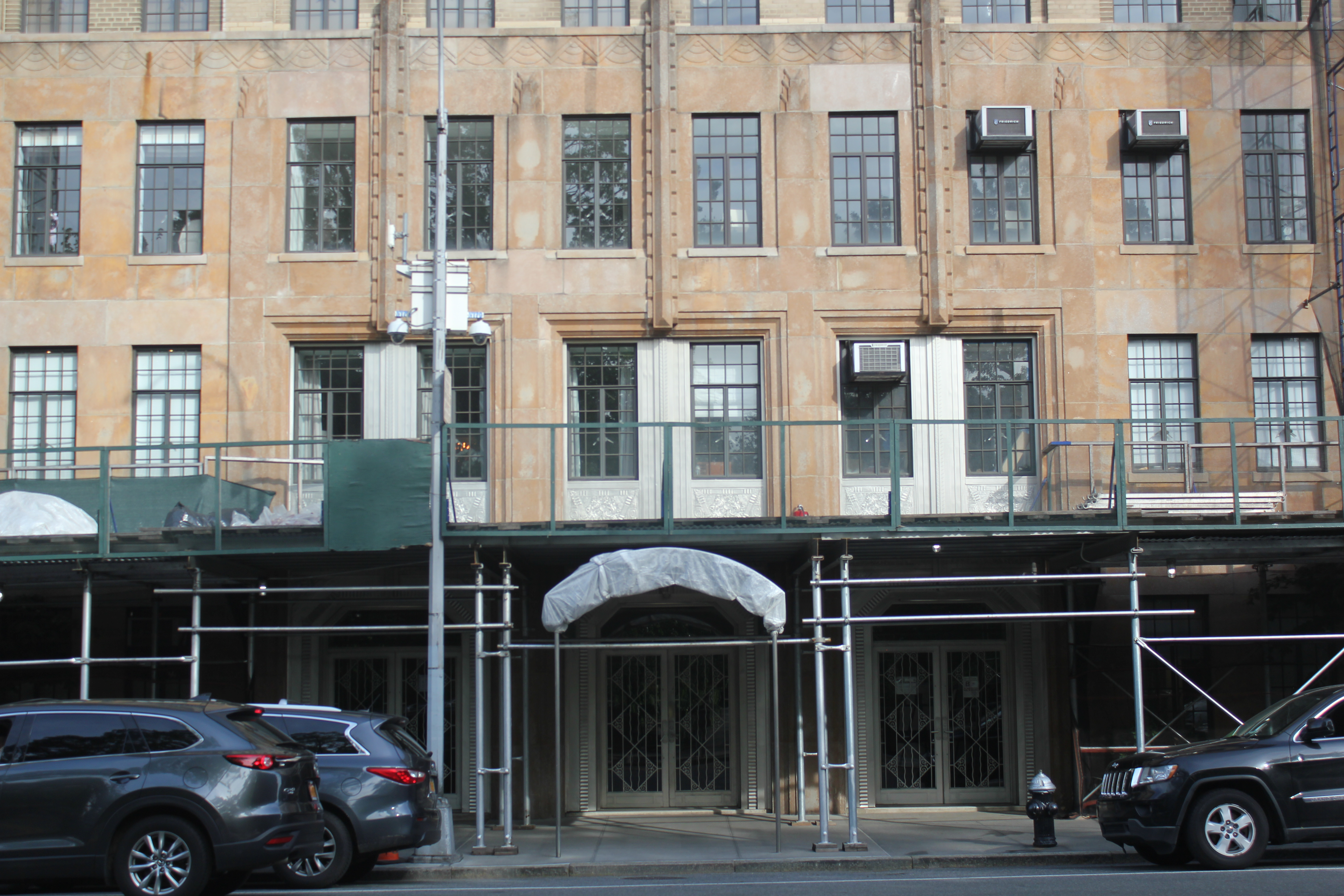
View of the main entrance

In March 1929, developer Frederick Brown acquired the original El Dorado Apartments, as well as eight adjacent row houses on 90th and 91st Streets. The assemblage measured 200 ft (61 m) long on Central Park West and 90th Street and 175 ft (53 m) long on 91st Street. Three weeks later, Brown resold the sites to Louis Klosk, a Bronx-based developer who planned to erect a similarly named 22-story apartment building at a cost of $8.5 million.

Klosk hired Margon & Holder and Emery Roth to design the building, and the architects created multiple designs. Early plans called for a 16-story building with a streamlined base and a flat top. During the development process, Roth's classical designs were changed to more closely resemble the Art Deco style. Margon & Holder's final plans depicted a 28-story, twin-towered building that, except for the shape of the finials, was identical to the current building. The final plans called for two towers above a base of 18 or 19 stories. The lowest stories would have 186 apartments, each with four to eight rooms. The towers would contain two apartments per floor, each with eight rooms and four bathrooms.

Elkay Builders Corporation was hired as the new El Dorado's builder, and demolition of the existing site was underway by November 1929. That month, Klosk obtained a $4.5 million loan from the General Realty and Utilities Corporation. The Wall Street Crash of 1929 had a delayed impact on the building. Even in January 1930, a brochure proclaimed that the El Dorado had been "designed with impressive simplicity" and would be completed the next year. Leasing commenced in 1930, but the building was not complete when the leasing season ended at the beginning of October. As a result, it was nearly impossible to obtain a construction mortgage. That November, the building's contractors filed for unpaid mechanic's liens that were worth "several hundred thousand dollars".

=== Rental house ===
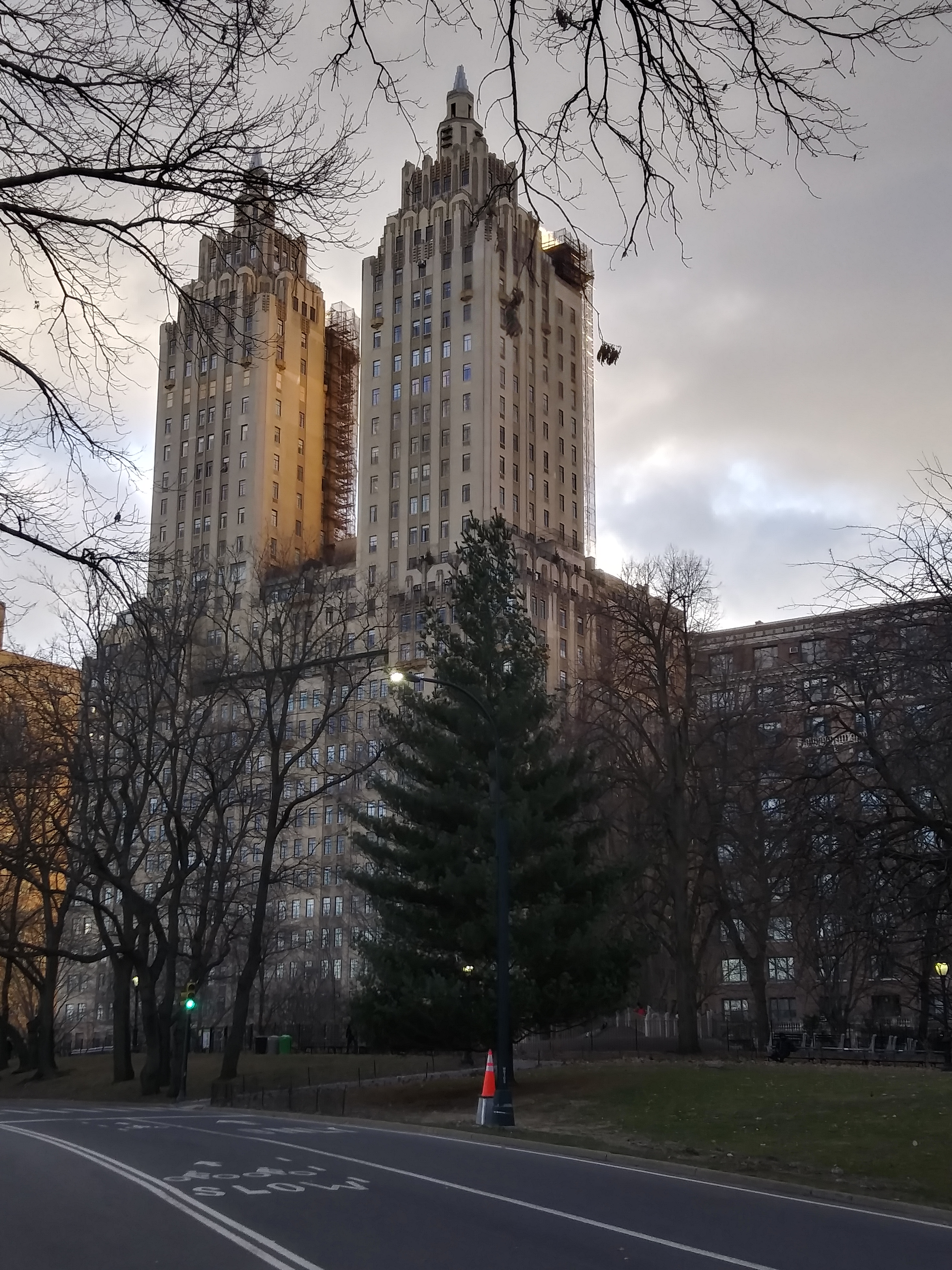
Seen from just inside Central Park near 92nd Street

The El Dorado was completed around 1931 or 1932. Klosk continued to experience financial issues and, in June 1931, he defaulted on a mortgage worth $3.1 million. Four months later, the New York City government scheduled a foreclosure auction for the El Dorado. In early November 1931, the Central Park Plaza Corporation took over the El Dorado for $4.2 million, having submitted the only bid in the auction. Klosk did not live in the El Dorado, but he did have a home nearby on Central Park West. By 1938, the El Dorado's manager E. Eugene Grossman reported that 95 percent of the building's apartments had been rented. The next year, Grossman and building resident John Gunther opened a gallery of French art, having found that many residents were also interested in modern art. The journalist Peter Osnos wrote that the El Dorado and other Central Park West apartment houses contained many Jewish residents during the 1930s and 1940s, since these buildings were not "restricted", unlike others on the East Side.

Albert Pick Jr. of the Pick Hotels Corporation acquired the building in 1943, buying all of the Central Park Plaza Corporation's stock from General Realty & Utilities Corporation and Lehman Corporation. The purchase was made subject to an existing mortgage of $2.07 million from Aetna. The Pick Hotels Corporation refinanced the El Dorado in 1947 with a $2.2 million mortgage loan from Mutual Benefit Life Insurance Company. Two years later, the Central Park Plaza Corporation announced its intent to subdivide some of the apartments. The units had previously fallen under statewide rent regulations, but the newly divided apartments did not have such regulations. Furthermore, the firm's vice president H. J. McCormick had already subdivided several of the larger units in the preceding year, and many families had quickly leased the small units. Pick obtained a $2.4 million mortgage for the El Dorado from John J. Reynolds Inc. in 1950.

In January 1953, Hugh K. McGovern acquired all of the Central Park Plaza Corporation's stock. Pick said he had sold the building because Pick Hotels mainly operated short-term hotels, but the El Dorado's occupants were long-term residents. McGovern planned to renovate the basement into a parking garage for residents; the previous owners had spent $750,000 on renovating the building since its opening. That May, the Central Park Plaza Corporation sold the El Dorado to Charles M. "Daddy" Grace, the Bishop of the United House of Prayer for All People, an African-American congregation. The New York Amsterdam News reported: "All of its occupants are white, and were white when Daddy Grace astonished the real estate world by announcing that he had bought it". Grace said he intended to operate the building solely for investment purposes. At the El Dorado, Grace faced heavy overhead costs because he had to pay high salaries for staff, including elevator operators. By November 1959, he was planning to sell the building, but the U.S. government had placed a lien on his estate, preventing him from selling the property.

Grace died in January 1960. A resident sued Grace's estate the following month, claiming that he had neglected the building during his lifetime. Alexander Gross of Eldorado Estates Ltd. announced in March 1960 that he had bought the building. He could not take ownership immediately because a federal court had to approve the sale. Gross finally took over the El Dorado at the beginning of May 1960, even as Grace's followers attempted to prevent the trustees of Grace's estate from cashing a $1.055 million check from the buyer. A group of Grace's followers filed a lawsuit in 1961, stating that Grace's properties, including the El Dorado, should not have been sold. The building still employed elevator operators, who occasionally went on strike, forcing tenants to walk up to their apartments. By the late 1970s, the building was owned mainly by Marcus Retter through a management company. Residents during the time generally had a favorable view of staff, in spite of the elevator strikes.

=== Cooperative conversion ===
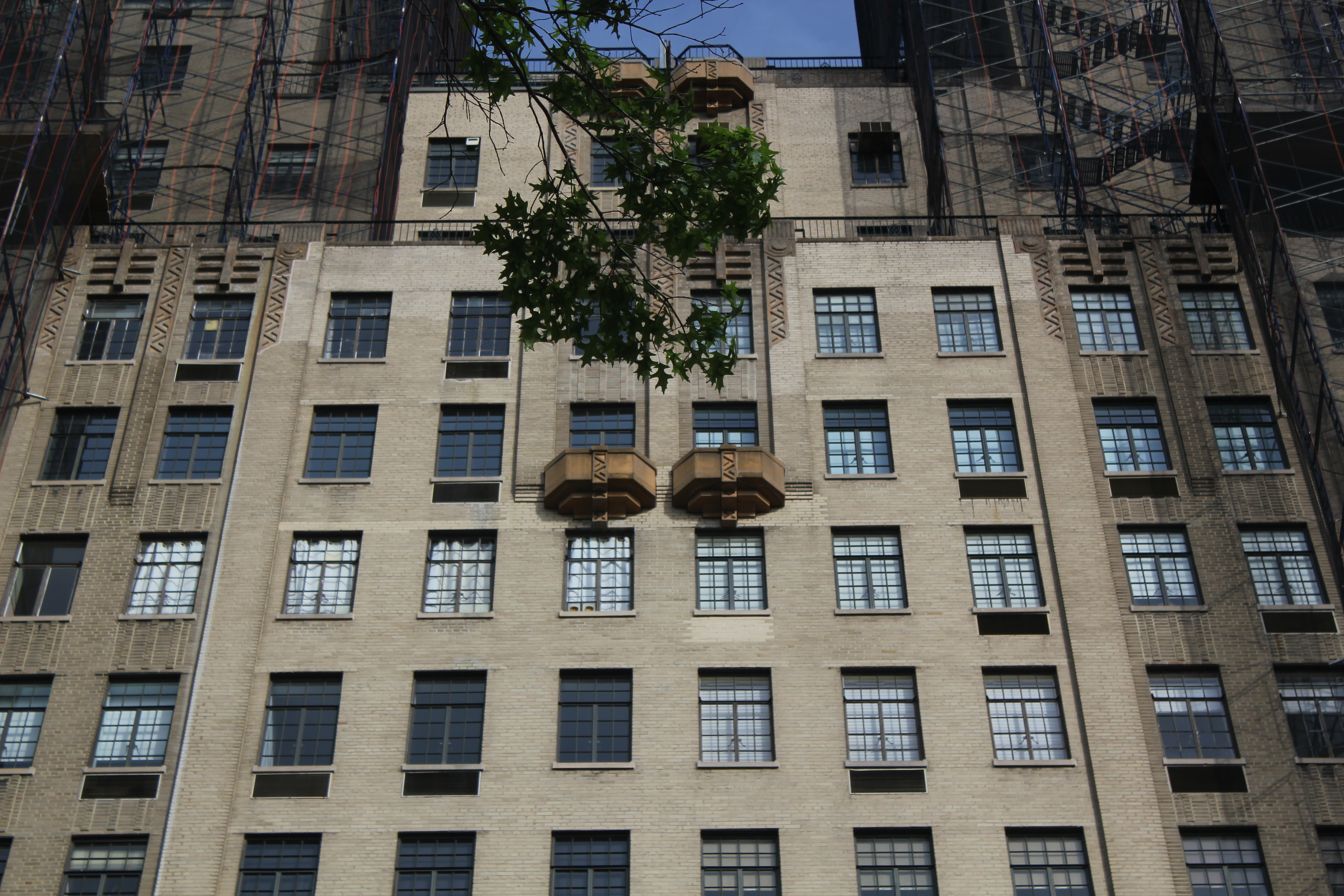
Balconies in the central grouping of upper stories

In July 1982, the El Dorado became a housing cooperative; the residents became stakeholders in the El Dorado's upkeep, and nine directors were appointed to manage the building. Over the next two years, the directors upgraded the building using money from the El Dorado's $2.28 million reserve fund. The work included replacing mechanical equipment, automating the elevator cabs, and restoring the lobby and garage doors. Joseph Lombardi redesigned the lobby, while Restoration Planning and architect Michael Jackson executed the restoration. The co-op board also planned to replace the original casement windows with either double-hung sash windows or pivoting windows, since the original windows were leaking. This prompted opposition from some tenants, who urged the New York City Landmarks Preservation Commission (LPC) to designate the El Dorado as a landmark, thus preventing the window replacement.

Difficulties continued in subsequent years. After the building was designated as a New York City landmark in 1985, the co-op board had to revise its plans to replace the windows. The building's value doubled between 1987 and 1989, and the tax for each apartment was correspondingly doubled over a five-year period. By 1992, the windows at the El Dorado were finally being replaced. A gymnasium in the basement, which had been first proposed in the early 1980s, was completed in 1995 after two previous attempts to construct the gym had failed. During that decade, Crain's New York described the Majestic, Beresford, and El Dorado as having "become brand names that grow in strength as noted personalities move in". Starting in 2000, the firm of Lawless & Mangione began restoring the facade as part of a multi-year, $4 million renovation. The cast-stone balconies were replaced with glass-fiber reinforced concrete terraces, and new windows approximating the original designs were also installed. During the 2020s, the towers' facades were renovated.

== Residents ==
Residents have included:

- Edie Adams, actress
- Trey Anastasio, musician
- Milton Clark Avery, painter
- Alec Baldwin, actor
- Martin Balsam, actor
- Bono, musician
- Sybil Burton, actress
- Royal Copeland, New York senator
- Phil Donahue, actor and producer
- Richard Dreyfuss, actor
- Faye Dunaway, actress
- Richard Estes, artist
- Carrie Fisher, actress
- Michael J. Fox, actor
- Joseph A. Gavagan, politician and judge
- John Gunther, writer
- Ron Howard, director
- Garrison Keillor, author
- John Koch, painter
- Ernie Kovacs, actor
- Sinclair Lewis, author
- Groucho Marx, actor
- Strive Masiyiwa, businessman
- Roddy McDowell, actor
- Moby, musician
- Marilyn Monroe, actress
- Patrice Munsel, soprano
- Jack Pearl, actor
- Barney Pressman, founder of retail clothing store Barneys New York
- Marlo Thomas, actress and producer
- Stephen S. Wise, prominent rabbi of Reform Judaism
- Tuesday Weld, actress
- Bruce Willis, actor
- Pinchas Zukerman, musician

The building was also the fictional address of Marjorie Morningstar, the heroine of Herman Wouk's 1955 novel.

== Impact ==
In 1930, as the building was being completed, The New York Times wrote that "The lofty towers of the San Remo and El Dorado apartments, rising high over the park area and clearly observable from long distances, provide an object lesson of the new architectural treatment there." The architectural critic Paul Goldberger said in 1974 that the spires "are probably best described as Aztec‐modern" but that they resembled the pinnacle of the Empire State Building from a distance. In 1986, Steven Ruttenbaum wrote: "The futuristic sculptural detailing of the El Dorado, as well as its geometric ornament and patterns and its contrasting materials and textures, make it one of the finest Art Deco structures in the city." The AIA Guide to New York City likened the spires to "Flash Gordon finials" in 2001. The New York Times said two years later that the presence of Central Park West's "architectural gems", such as the El Dorado, contributed to increased housing prices on the eastern side of Central Park, along Fifth Avenue.

The building is a contributing property to the Central Park West Historic District, which was recognized by the U.S. National Register of Historic Places when its nomination was accepted on November 9, 1982. Following the dispute over the building's windows, the LPC hosted hearings in 1984 to determine whether the Century, Majestic, San Remo, Beresford, and El Dorado should be designated as city landmarks. Manhattan Community Board 7 supported all five designations. The El Dorado's residents also supported the designation of their own home, but the co-op board raised concerns over how the designation would impact window replacements. The LPC designated the El Dorado as a city landmark on July 9, 1985, citing its brickwork, entrances, window layouts, balconies, and "futuristic crowning pinnacles". The El Dorado is also part of the Upper West Side Historic District, which became a New York City historic district in 1990.

== See also ==
- Art Deco architecture of New York City
- List of New York City Designated Landmarks in Manhattan from 59th to 110th Streets
