= Black sermonic tradition =

African-American preaching approach

The Black sermonic tradition, or Black preaching tradition, is an approach to sermon (or homily) construction and delivery practiced primarily among African Americans in the Black Church.

== Aspects ==
Scholars and practitioners have recognized three primary elements of this tradition.

1. Authenticity: the preacher is free to be their authentic Black self without having to code switch.
2. Rhetorical embellishments: jarring hyperbole, matching body language, and musicality in vocalisations.
3. Social impact and historical significance: there are often mentions of challenges imposed by dominant social structures throughout history.

=== Whooping ===
Raboteau describes a common style of Black preaching called "whooping", which first developed in the early 19th century, and became common throughout the 20th and into the 21st centuries:

The preacher begins calmly, speaking in conversational, if oratorical and occasionally grandiloquent, prose; he then gradually begins to speak more rapidly, excitedly, and to chant his words and time to a regular beat; finally, he reaches an emotional peak in which the chanted speech becomes tonal and merges with the singing, clapping, and shouting of the congregation.

This aspect of Black preaching often utilizes what is called "preaching chords", bombastic interpolations played on an organ and juxtaposed with the preacher's emphatic lines.

== See also ==
- Imprecations (Bible)
- Black church
- Preaching Chords
