= Getting happy (Christianity) =

Religious term referring to the experience of being filled with the Holy Spirit

Getting happy, an experience seen almost exclusively in the Black Church and in Pentecostal churches generally, refers to the experience of being filled with the Holy Spirit, usually involving ecstatic singing, dancing, and a general spiritual fervor. It is heavily associated with shout music (as the music and the bodily expression are largely inseparable).

Accounts of nineteenth-century African American slave spirituality use the term, as recorded in the book God Struck Me Dead: Voices of Ex-Slaves.

All of my people were great Christians. Shouting, singing, praying, and good old heartfelt religion make up the things that filled their lives. [...] Aunt Charlotte used to cry most all the time when she got happy. —an ex-slave preacher, in God Struck Me Dead, page 75.

One of the early nineteenth-century traditional 'Negro Spirituals' to use the phrase, is the following:

GOOD MORNING EVERYBODY

Good morning everybody
Good morning everybody, Lord
My soul got happy this morning
My soul got happy this morning, Lord

You may call me “hypocrite member”
You may call me “hypocrite member”, Lord
But my soul got happy, this morning
But my soul got happy this morning, Lord

I’m going to see my mother
I’m going to see my mother, Lord
Going to sit down by my Jesus
Going to sit down by my Jesus, Lord.

()

== Further information ==
For other examples of such gospel music see the following:

Say Amen, Somebody featuring Thomas A. Dorsey on DVD video
Greatest Gospel Hits by Shirley Caesar
