= United House of Prayer for All People =

Christian denomination

United House of Prayer for All People

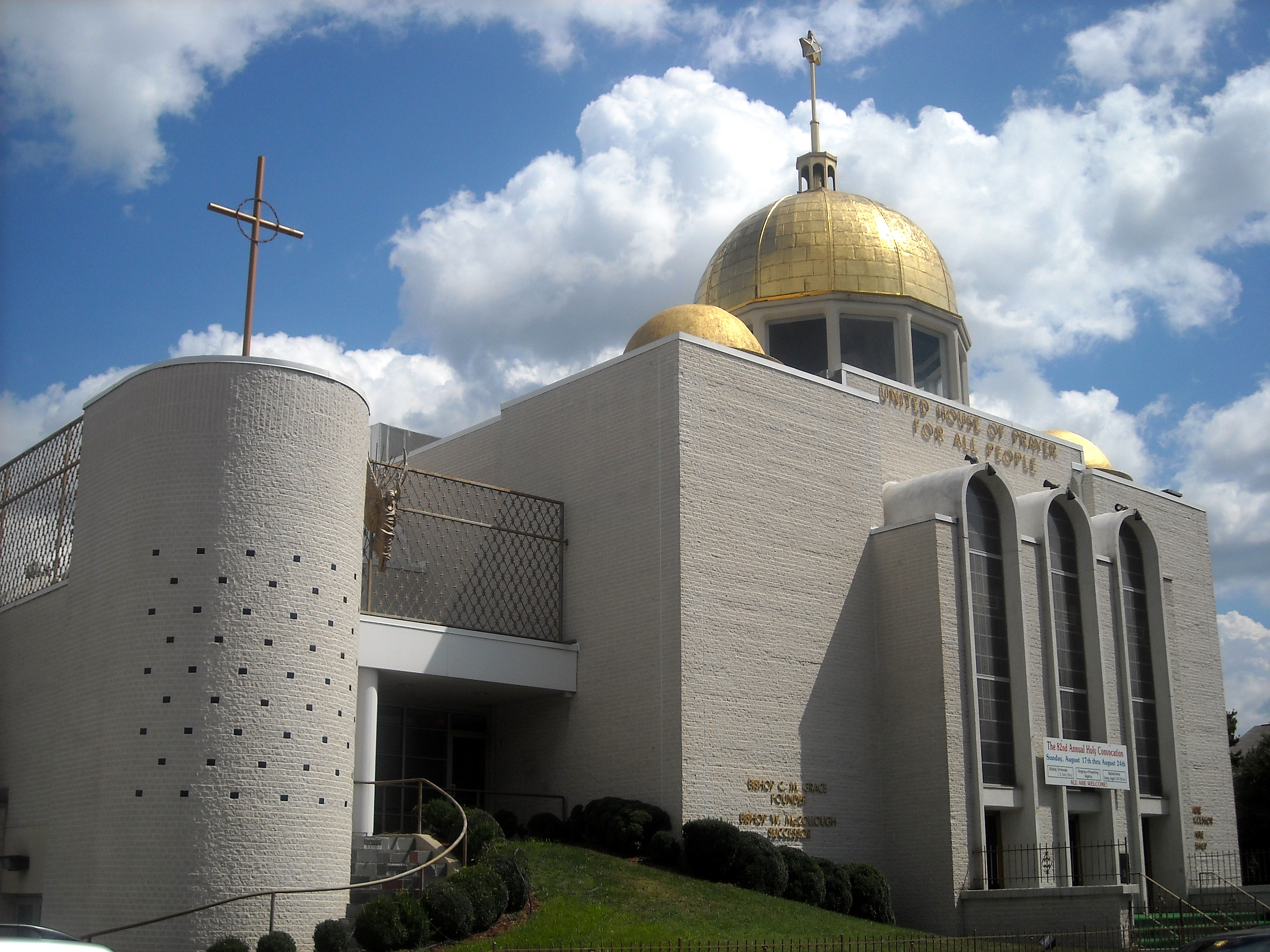
- The Headquarters of The United House of Prayer for All People located in Washington D.C.
- Classification: Protestant Christian
- Orientation: Apostolic/Pentecostal
- Polity: Episcopal oriented
- Region: United States
- Founder: Marcelino Manuel da Graça
- Origin: 1919; West Wareham Massachusetts, incorporated in 1927 in Washington, D.C.
- Congregations: 145
- Members: 27,500-50,000
- Official website: http://www.tuhopfap.org/

The United House of Prayer for All People, officially the United House of Prayer for All People of the Church on the Rock of the Apostolic Faith or simply the United House of Prayer (UHOP) is a religious denomination. It was founded by Marcelino Manuel da Graça. In 1919, Grace built the first United House of Prayer For All People in West Wareham, Massachusetts, and incorporated the United House of Prayer for All People in Washington, D.C. in 1927.

- According to church literature and their official website, the United House of Prayer for All People has 137 places of worship in 29 states. The church has an estimated membership of 27,500-50,000 members. The national headquarters for the church is located in Washington, D.C. at 601 M Street.

The United House of Prayer for All People owns and operates soul food restaurants that serve the communities and host annual "Memorial Day" marching parades in honor of its past bishops. The United House of Prayer for All People is noted for its public street baptisms, sometimes performed by fire hose, and for its shout bands.

== Etymology ==
The first portion of the name is derived from Isaiah 56:7 where God says: "Mine house shall be called a house of prayer for all people." This is taken literally i.e., that God's church should be named the “House of Prayer for All People”. (This is also found in Matthew 21:13, Mark 11:17, and Luke 19:46). The latter part is taken from "Acts 4:10–12 and Ephesians 2:20, which discusses Christian salvation as being built on a figurative cornerstone, or rock," which "is believed to be the teachings of Jesus Christ as preached by the Apostle Peter."

== Unique Honorific Bishop titles ==
The followers and members of the United House of Prayer for All People Church on the Rock of the Apostolic Faith refer to their presiding Bishop as "Sweet Daddy".

The Sweet part of the phrase "Sweet Daddy" refers to the phrase "sweet fragrance" or "sweet savoir" in 2 Corinthians 2:15 and Philippians 4:18, with Ephesians 5:2 and Leviticus 1:9 (and similar verses in Leviticus) also referring to a "sweet-smelling savior" or "pleasing aroma" to the Lord. These verses use the analogy of a fragrant offering to God, with believers representing a sweet aroma of Christ to God, while Leviticus describes ancient burnt offerings as a pleasing smell to the Lord.

The Daddy part of the phrase refers to 1 Corinthians 4:15, where the Apostle Paul refers to himself as the spiritual father of the Corinthians, stating, "For though ye have ten thousand instructors in Christ, yet have ye not many fathers: for in Christ Jesus I have begotten you through the gospel". He uses this analogy to describe his role as the one who led them to Christ and established the church, making him their spiritual parent. This is not seen as contradicting Jesus's command not to call anyone father, as Paul was referring to a spiritual role, not a literal or authoritative title in the worldly sense.

The members of the United House of Prayer for All People Church on the Rock of the Apostolic Faith often cry out "Abba, Father" (Daddy) as the early Christians did at Romans 8:15 and Galatians 4:6–7. These verses state that born again believers, through the Spirit of adoption, can cry out to God, "Abba, Father," expressing a deep, intimate relationship with Him.

== History ==
=== Bishop Grace ===
Bishop Charles Manuel "Sweet Daddy" Grace was born Marcelino Manuel da Graca, January 25, 1884, in Brava, Cape Verde Islands, a Portuguese possession off the west coast of Africa. After having a vision that he should start a church he came to America on a ship called Freedom in 1903 and settled in New Bedford, Massachusetts. After leaving his job as a railway cook, Grace began using the title bishop. In 1919, "Daddy" Grace, as parishioners knew him, built the first House of Prayer in West Wareham, Massachusetts at the cost of thirty-nine dollars. He later established branches in Charlotte, North Carolina and Newark, New Jersey.

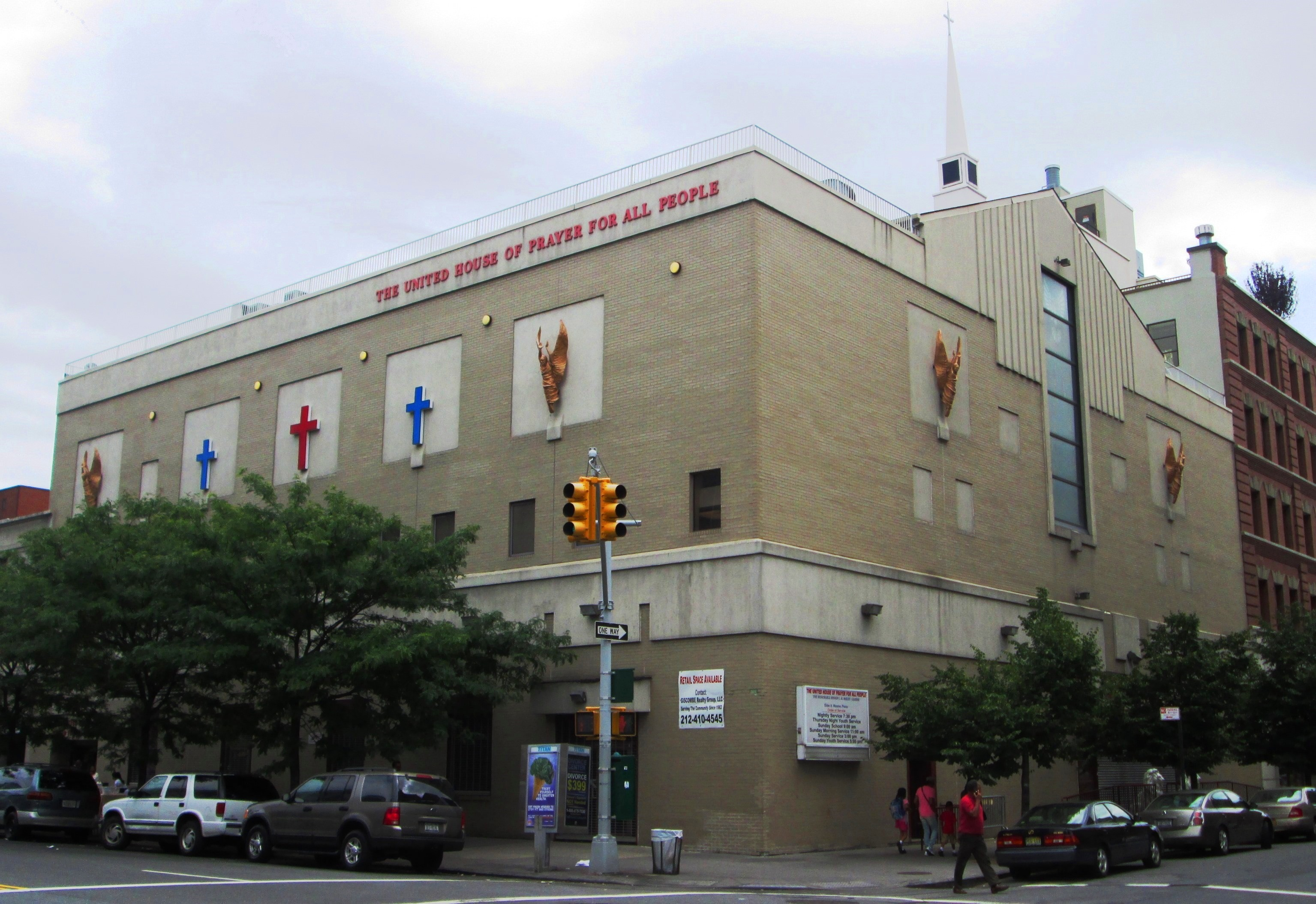
The "Mother House" in Harlem, New York City was founded in 1920 by Bishop Grace; the congregation moved to this building after their first house burned down in 1947

Throughout the 1920s and 1930s, Grace traveled America preaching and establishing the United House of Prayer for all People. The constitution and bylaws of The United House of Prayer, promulgated in 1929, stated that the purpose of the organization in pertinent part was "to erect and maintain places of worship and assembly where all people may gather prayer and to worship the Almighty God, irrespective of denomination or creed." He traveled extensively throughout the segregated South in the 1920s and 1930s preaching to integrated congregations years before the civil rights struggles of the 1950s and 1960s and the religious ecumenical movements which followed.

One of the principles that Grace taught which provoked controversy was the concept of one-man leadership. Grace used the Bible as his reference and taught that God only used one man at a time (e.g. Noah, Moses, and Jesus.) One of the many criticisms made against Grace is the following statement which Grace is to have allegedly made in the early 1940s: "Salvation is by Grace only. Grace has given God a vacation, and since He is on vacation, don't worry about Him. If you sin against God, Grace can save you, but if you sin against Grace, God cannot save you." Nonetheless, the "interpretation of this point – that Grace claimed he himself was God – has been almost completely definitive in both academic and popular literature, and only a handful of writers have ever questioned it, usually as an aside." The most extensive research done by Danielle Brune Sigler on this statement shows that Mr. Fauset selectively quoted certain parts of the original message which changed the context." The original statement, spoken by a member and not Grace, shows that the members and Grace, himself, thought that he was not "God himself", but merely an "intermediary" and "the path to salvation."

One reason for the early success of the denomination is that offerings went directly to Grace for investment into products such as soap, stationery, tea, coffee, cookies, toothpaste, facial creams, talcum powder, hair dressing, and the Grace Magazine.

Bishop Grace died on January 12, 1960, at his home in Los Angeles, California. Bishop W. McCollough succeeded him and served for 31 years.

=== Bishop McCollough ===
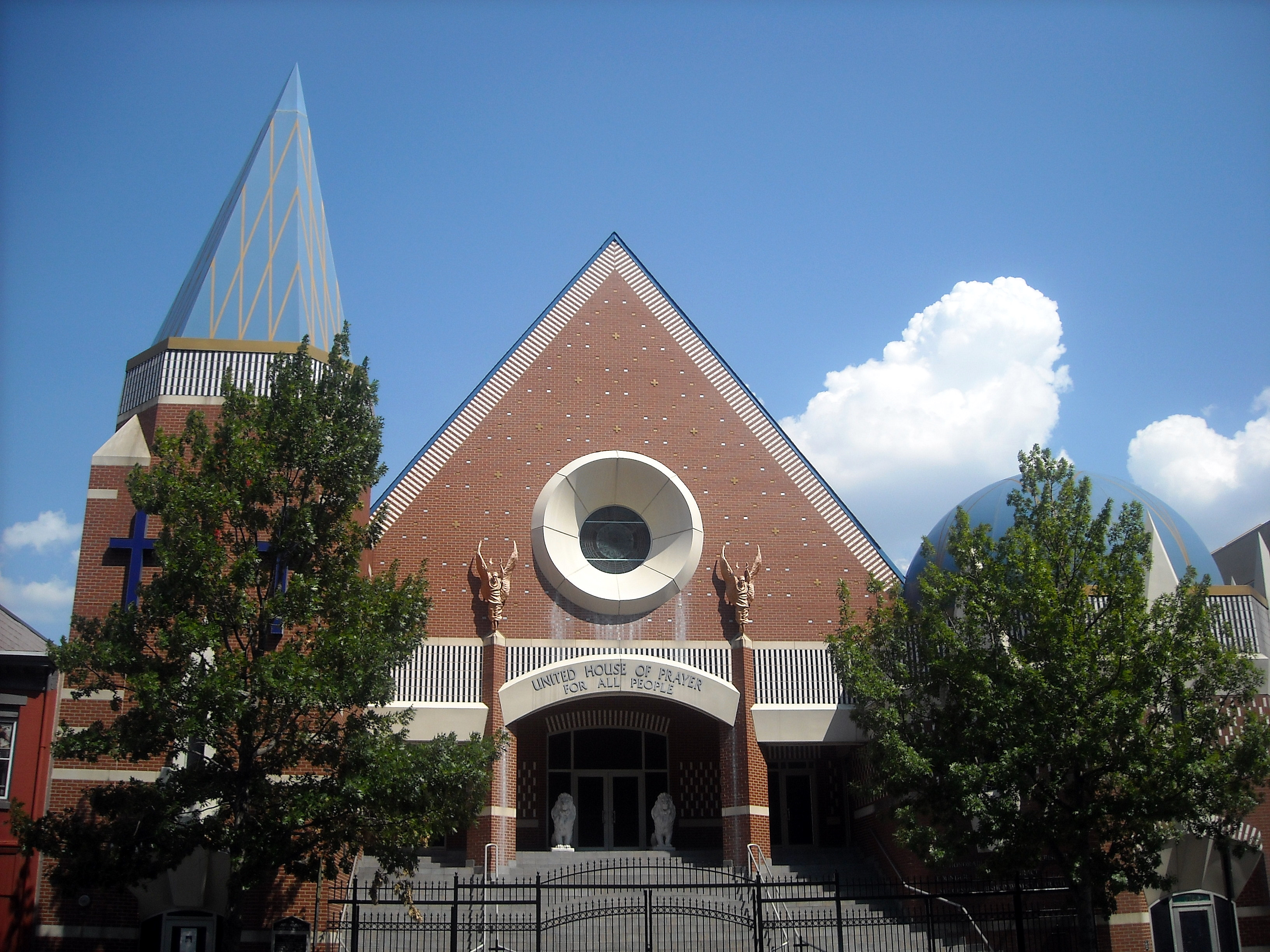
United House of Prayer for All People in the Shaw neighborhood of Washington, D.C.

When Grace died, the succession was undecided. After a court battle and two elections, Walter McCollough succeeded as the second bishop. Bishop McCollough launched a nationwide building program, under which low-income affordable housing was being erected. New church structures were built by their own construction teams and other edifices received major renovations, financed solely by the members. Day care centers and senior citizens homes were also erected. One of the unique features of Daddy McCollough's building programs was that all of the church structures were completely paid for at the time of dedication. Under his leadership, the House of Prayer acquired a fleet of luxury coaches; property was acquired for the House of Prayer for use as future development sites; concert and marching bands were organized to march in annual parades and annual competitions; and softball teams were organized, nationwide, for interstate competition.

In addition, the McCollough Scholarship Fund was established to allow youth of the church to pursue higher education. Bishop McCollough died on March 21, 1991.

=== Bishop Madison ===
Once again a crisis occurred over the succession, with Charles McCollough, a son of the late Bishop McCollough, and Samuel Christian Madison, the Senior Minister of "God's White House", struggling for control of the church. On May 24, 1991, the members voted Madison to the office of Bishop. Shortly after, Madison pledged to fulfill everything that was on Bishop McCollough's agenda. Under his administration, over 123 Houses of Prayer received major renovation or were constructed. Added to this number were numerous apartments, senior citizens' dwellings, parsonages, houses, and commercial properties.

Bishop Madison was an advocate for scholastic achievement and was the chief executive officer and major contributor to the McCollough Scholarship College Fund. Madison expanded the academic programs of the organization through inaugurating the Annual First Lady Scholastic Achievement Awards Program. Bishop Madison died on April 5, 2008.

=== Bishop Bailey ===
Bishop C. M. (Also known as "Sweet Daddy") Bailey, a native of Newport News, Virginia, and the former pastor/apostle of the United House of Prayer For All People in Augusta, Georgia (the "Motherhouse" or parent church for their ministry in Georgia), succeeded Daddy Madison on May 23, 2008. He was elected during Memorial Week in Washington, D. C. after having won 91% of the electoral votes by the General Assembly. As a result of the appointment, he became Sole Trustee of the United House of Prayer, and C.E.O. Bishop Daddy Bailey passed on August 11, 2023.

=== Bishop Cunningham ===
Bishop A. D. Cunningham was elected on October 13, 2023 as the national leader of the United House of Prayer for All People, succeeding the late Bishop Bailey and following in his footsteps.

== Structure ==
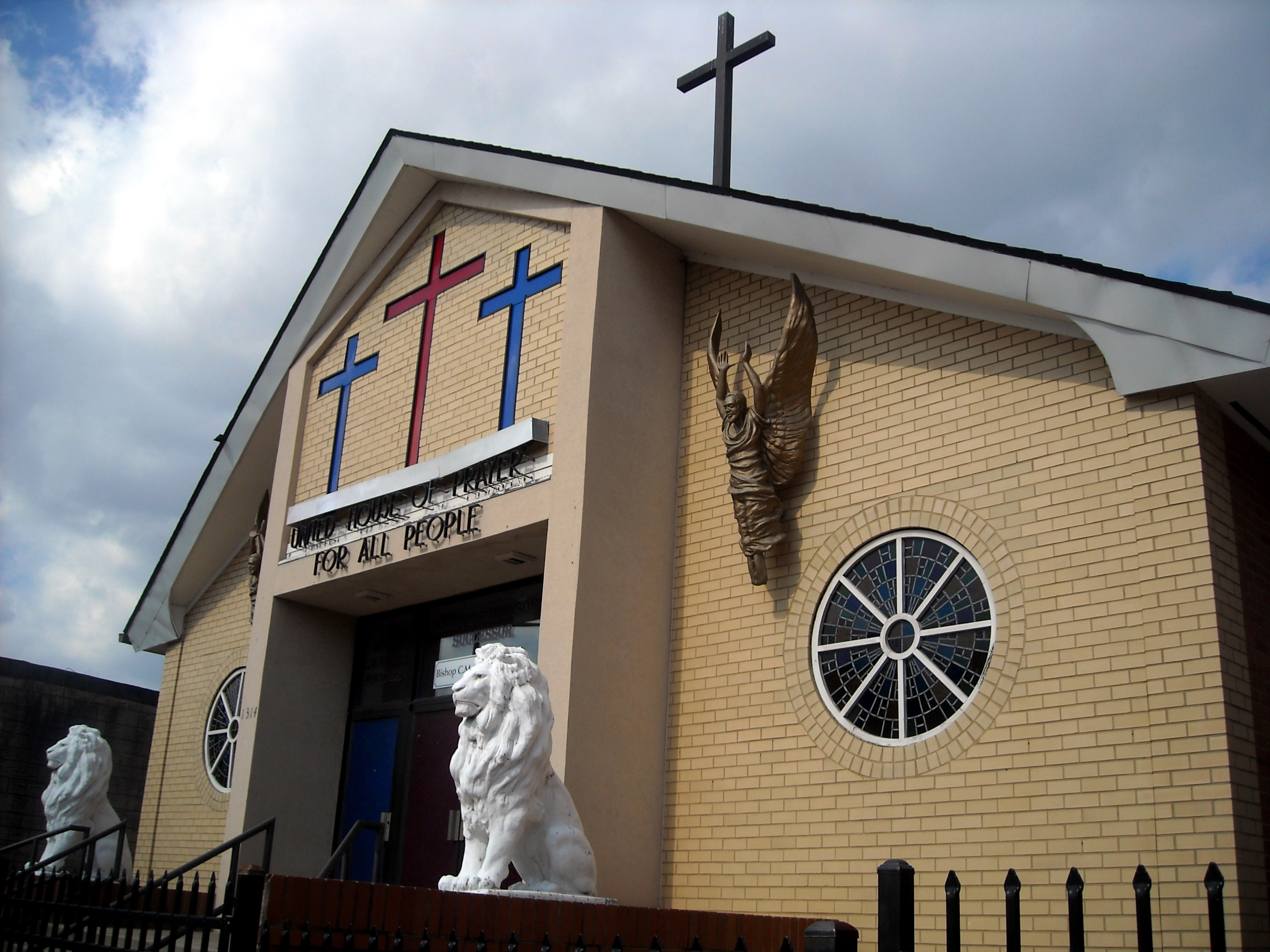
United House of Prayer for All People in the Near Northeast neighborhood of Washington, D.C.

The United House of Prayer as defined in their constitution and by-laws is composed of the bishop, elders, ministers, deacons, and all persons who assemble themselves in the various places of assembly maintained by the organization. "On a broader organization level, each House of Prayer belonged to a regional district" and each district is chaired by a minister who is the state chairman. The organization also has what they call the General Assembly which consist of the bishop, ministers, elders, and two elected representatives from each congregation. The General Assembly is the vehicle used to make amendments to the constitution and by-laws, to fill vacancies in the office of bishop, and to remove the bishop for cause. Besides the bishop, the General Assembly, ministers, and members, there exist an ecclesiastical court called the General Council. The General Council consist of the bishop, state chairmen and others who are appointed by the bishop and their primary responsibility is to protect the work of the organization and the bishop and to ensure that all houses and members are compliant with laws outlined in the Supreme Laws For the Government of the United House of Prayer.

The constitution and by-laws of the organization stipulate that the bishop must be in full knowledge of the doctrine of the United House of Prayer, ready to give answers in good faith, able to judge the various members among the church and congregations, and must be continuously working for the good of the organization in accordance with the rules of the New Testament. The bishop's role includes the power to select, ordain, and supervise ministers. He is also designated on behalf of the members as trustee of all church property.

== 2020 COVID-19 outbreak ==
On October 17, 2020, health officials in Mecklenburg County, North Carolina announced a COVID-19 outbreak was linked to the United House of Prayer's "Holy Convocation" held at the Charlotte motherhouse on October 4-11. The event drew at least 1,000 people from North Carolina, South Carolina, Georgia, New Jersey and New York. Over 140 positive tests for the virus have been linked to the convocation. Of those cases, seven people required hospital care, and five people died. Health officials tried to identify 192 close contacts

Despite this, the organization was prepared to move ahead with a weeklong "Worldwind Revival" in Charlotte beginning on October 25. In response, on October 24, Mecklenburg County health officials issued an "abatement of imminent hazard" order that barred all in-person events at the United House of Prayer's Mecklenburg County facilities until at least November 6, 2020. The order also requires that the Charlotte motherhouse be cleaned and disinfected before in-person gatherings can be held there again.

Several members subsequently reached out to WCNC-TV in Charlotte, claiming that the Charlotte event was the culmination of 12 weeks of gatherings across the East Coast that began in July. They also claimed that the convocations continued even in areas with high case counts, and even in the wake of several outbreaks and deaths among members. One member shared a letter from Bailey in which the bishop insisted that members come to services "when you can." In the letter, Bailey also rebuked several pastors who told their flocks to stay home, saying that members should not become "lazy and non-supportive in (their) weak state."

== Doctrine ==
The United House of Prayer for All People believes that the word church means a group of House of Prayer members who are believers and worshippers in Christ and that the modern definition of church as a building, denomination, or institution is unbiblical according to the writings of the Holy Scriptures as recorded in Acts 9:31."

== Memorial ==
A mausoleum in memory of W. McCollough and S. C. Madison was built in Lincoln Cemetery in Suitland, Maryland. The monument also honors C. M. Grace and the United House of Prayer for All People of the Church on The Rock of The Apostolic Faith. The memorial features several larger-than-lifesize statues. W. McCollough is buried at Fort Lincoln Cemetery, Brentwood, Maryland.
