= List of travel magazines =

This is a list of notable travel and tourism magazines.

== Travel and tourism-related magazines ==
=== In circulation ===
- Afar (2009)
- Arizona Highways (1921; published by the Arizona Department of Transportation)
- Arthur Frommer's Budget Travel (1999; published by Intellitravel Media)
- Bold Traveller (2011; published by Moreno Co. Communications)
- British Columbia Magazine (1959; My Passion Media)
- CAA Magazine (1914; initially called the Canadian Motorist Magazine, published by the Canadian Automobile Association)
- Canadian Geographic Magazine (1930; published by The Royal Canadian Geographical Society - RCGS)
- Caravan (1933; Warners Midlands Plc)
- Caribbean Beat (1992; published by Media and Editorial Projects Limited, inflight magazine of Caribbean Airlines)
- Condé Nast Traveler (1987; published by Condé Nast Publications)
- Darling (2009)
- Departures Magazine (1984; published by American Express Publishing)
- Discovery Tanzania (2022; A tourism-oriented adventure magazine published in East Africa)
- DreamScapes Travel & Lifestyle Magazine (1996; published by Globelite Travel Marketing Inc.)
- DRIFT Travel Magazine (2017; Digital luxury travel magazine with a Print-on-Demand option)
- EnRoute, inflight magazine of Air Canada
- Escapism Travel Magazine
- Executive Travel magazine (2002; published by American Express)
- Explore Magazine (1981; published by Explore Outdoor Media Inc.)
- FIDO Friendly (2003)
- Geoparks Africa (2021; A dedicated online travel magazine for Geo-tourism and World Heritage Sites)
- Get Lost Magazine (2004; published by Grin Creative)
- Global Traveler Magazine (2004; published by FXExpress Publications, Inc.)
- Hana Hou! (1998; published by Pacific Travelogue Inc., as the inflight magazine of Hawaiian Airlines)
- Islands (published by Bonnier Corporation)
- Holiday (1946–1977; Curtis Publishing Company, relaunched in Paris, France, in 2014)
- JourneyWoman Magazine (1994; JourneyWoman Enterprises Inc, in Canada, monthly)
- Lonely Planet Traveller (2009; published by the BBC in the UK, monthly. Also Argentine, Singaporean and Indian editions, also published in the Netherlands and Germany by Pijper Media six times a year)
- Maui No Ka 'Oi Magazine (published by the Haynes Publishing Group, bi-monthly regional travel focus)
- Merian (1948; (in German), published by Jahreszeiten Verlag, Hamburg)
- Metropolis (1994)
- National Geographic Traveler (1984; National Geographic)
- Offshore Travel Magazine (2018; published by the Baxter Media)
- Outlook Travel Magazine (2013; published by Outlook Publishing Ltd.)
- Outside (1977; published by Mariah Media)
- New Mexico Magazine (1923; published by the New Mexico Tourism Department)
- Northern Soul Magazine (2023; published by Landsby)
- re:porter magazine (2015; inflight magazine of Porter Airlines)
- Road & Travel Magazine (1989; published by Caldwell Communications, Michigan)
- Roamancing Travel & Culture Magazine (2011; published by Ahimsa Media)
- RoadRUNNER (2001; published by RoadRUNNER Publishing, focuses on motorcycle touring and travel)
- Saltscape Magazine (2000; published by Metro Guide Publishing - MGP)
- Saveur (1994; published by Bonnier Corporation)
- Sidetrip Travel Magazine (Manila, focuses on travel in the Philippines)
- Sports+Travel Hong Kong (Hong Kong, free magazine that focuses on sports related travel from Hong Kong)
- Suitcase Magazine (2012; published by SUITCASE Magazine)
- TANK Magazine Travel Issue (1998; [UK] published annually by TANK)
- The Sunday Times Travel Magazine (2003; [UK] published by News UK)
- Travel Life Magazine (2013)
- Sunset (1898; Sunset Publishing Corporation)
- Texas Highways (1980)
- TNT (1983; published by TNT Publishing, London, free magazine for Australian, New Zealand and South African expatriates)
- Today's Traveller (1997; published by Gill India Communications Pvt. Ltd. (GICPL), Indian international travel magazine)
- TravelMedia.in (2022; published from India, updated daily)
- Travel + Leisure (1971; published by Exposure Media Marketing)
- Travel Agent (1930; trade, published by Questex Media Group)
- Travel in Taiwan (Vision International Publishing Co. Ltd., on behalf of the Taiwan Tourism Bureau)
- Travel Trade Gazette (TTG) (1953; trade, published by United Bupsiness Media, London)
- Vagabond (1987, Sweden)
- Wanderlust Magazine (1993; Independent; eight issues per annum; editor and publisher is Lyn Hughes)
- Weg! (2004; (in Afrikaans), published by Media24)
- Where (1938)
- Yankee (1935)
- YAM Magazine - Victoria's Lifestyle Magazine (2009; trade, published by Page One Publishing Inc.)

=== Out of print ===
- Blue (1997–2000; tourism magazine)
- Caribbean Travel & Life (c. 1986–2013; published by Bonnier Corporation, replaced by Islands magazine)
- Gulfscapes Magazine (2001–2012; published by Craig and Victoria Rogers)
- Travel + Leisure Golf (1998–2009; American Express)
- Travel Holiday (1901–2003; New York Central Railroad, Shane family, Reader's Digest, Hachette Filipacchi Media U.S.)
- Walkabout magazine (1934–1974; Australian National Travel Association)
