= Musicology =

Scholarly study of music

Musicology is the academic, research-based study of music, as opposed to musical composition or performance. Musicology research combines and intersects with many fields, including psychology, sociology, acoustics, neurology, natural sciences, formal sciences and computer science.

Musicology is traditionally divided into three branches: music history, systematic musicology, and ethnomusicology. Historical musicologists study the history of musical traditions, the origins of works, and the biographies of composers. Ethnomusicologists draw from anthropology (particularly field research) to understand how and why people make music. Systematic musicology includes music theory, aesthetics, pedagogy, musical acoustics, the science and technology of musical instruments (organology), and the musical implications of physiology, psychology, sociology, philosophy and computing. Cognitive musicology is the set of phenomena surrounding the cognitive modeling of music. When musicologists carry out research using computers, their research often falls under the field of computational musicology. Music therapy is a specialized form of applied musicology which is sometimes considered more closely affiliated with health fields, and other times regarded as part of musicology proper.

== Background ==
The word musicology comes from Greek μουσική mousikē 'music' and -λογια -logia, 'domain of study'.

The 19th-century philosophical trends that led to the re-establishment of formal musicology education in German and Austrian universities had combined methods of systematization with evolution. These models were established not only in the field of physical anthropology, but also cultural anthropology. This was influenced by Hegel's ideas on ordering "phenomena" which can be understood & distinguished from simple to complex stages of evolution. They are further classified into primitive & developed sections; whereas the particular stages of history are understood & distinguished as ancient to modern. Comparative methods became more widespread in musicology beginning around 1880.

== Parent disciplines ==
The parent disciplines of musicology include:

- General history
- Cultural studies
- Philosophy (particularly philosophy of music, aesthetics and semiotics)
- Ethnology and cultural anthropology
- Archaeology and prehistory
- Psychology and sociology
- Physiology and neuroscience
- Acoustics and psychoacoustics
- Information sciences and mathematics

Musicology also has two central, practically oriented sub-disciplines with no parent discipline: performance practice and research, and the theory, analysis and composition of music. The disciplinary neighbors of musicology address other forms of art, performance, ritual, and communication, including the history and theory of the visual and plastic arts and architecture; linguistics, literature and theater; religion and theology; and sport. Musical knowledge is applied within medicine, education and music therapy—which, effectively, are parent disciplines of applied musicology.

== Subdisciplines ==
=== Historical musicology ===
Music history or historical musicology is concerned with the composition, performance, reception and criticism of music over time. Historical studies of music are for example concerned with a composer's life and works, the developments of styles and genres (such as baroque concertos), the social function of music for a particular group of people, (such as court music), or modes of performance at a particular place and time (such as Johann Sebastian Bach's choir in Leipzig). Like the comparable field of art history, different branches and schools of historical musicology emphasize different types of musical works and approaches to music. There are also national differences in various definitions of historical musicology. In theory, "music history" could refer to the study of the history of any type or genre of music, such as the music of India or rock music. In practice, these research topics are more often considered within ethnomusicology and "historical musicology" is typically assumed to imply Western Art music of the European tradition.

The methods of historical musicology include source studies (especially manuscript studies), palaeography, philology (especially textual criticism), style criticism, historiography (the choice of historical method), musical analysis (analysis of music to find "inner coherence") and iconography. The application of musical analysis to further these goals is often a part of music history, though pure analysis or the development of new tools of music analysis is more likely to be seen in the field of music theory. Music historians create a number of written products, ranging from journal articles describing their current research, new editions of musical works, biographies of composers and other musicians, book-length studies or university textbook chapters or entire textbooks. Music historians may examine issues in a close focus, as in the case of scholars who examine the relationship between words and music for a given composer's art songs. On the other hand, some scholars take a broader view and assess the place of a given type of music, such as the symphony in society using techniques drawn from other fields, such as economics, sociology or philosophy.

=== New musicology ===
New musicology is a term applied since the late 1980s to a wide body of work emphasizing cultural study, analysis and criticism of music. Such work may be based on feminist, gender studies, queer theory or postcolonial theory, or the work of Theodor W. Adorno. Although New Musicology emerged from within historical musicology, the emphasis on cultural study within the Western art music tradition places New Musicology at the junction between historical, ethnological and sociological research in music.

New musicology was a reaction against traditional historical musicology, which according to Susan McClary, "fastidiously declares issues of musical signification off-limits to those engaged in legitimate scholarship." Charles Rosen, however, retorts that McClary, "sets up, like so many of the 'new musicologists', a straw man to knock down, the dogma that music has no meaning, and no political or social significance." Today, many musicologists no longer distinguish between musicology and new musicology since it has been recognized that many of the scholarly concerns once associated with new musicology already were mainstream in musicology, so that the term "new" no longer applies.

=== Ethnomusicology ===
Ethnomusicology, formerly comparative musicology, is the study of music in its cultural context. It is often considered the anthropology or ethnography of music. Jeff Todd Titon has called it the study of "people making music". Although it is most often concerned with the study of non-Western music, it also includes the study of Western music from an anthropological or sociological perspective, cultural studies and sociology as well as other disciplines in the social sciences and humanities. Some ethnomusicologists primarily conduct historical studies, but the majority are involved in long-term participant observation or combine ethnographic, musicological, and historical approaches in their fieldwork. Therefore, ethnomusicological scholarship can be characterized as featuring a substantial, intensive fieldwork component, often involving long-term residence within the community studied. Closely related to ethnomusicology is the emerging branch of sociomusicology. For instance, Ko (2011) proposed the hypothesis of "Biliterate and Trimusical" in Hong Kong sociomusicology.

=== Popular music studies ===
Popular music studies, known, "misleadingly", as popular musicology, emerged in the 1980s as an increasing number of musicologists, ethnomusicologists and other varieties of historians of American and European culture began to write about popular music past and present. The first journal focusing on popular music studies was Popular Music which began publication in 1981. The same year an academic society solely devoted to the topic was formed, the International Association for the Study of Popular Music. The association's founding was partly motivated by the interdisciplinary agenda of popular musicology though the group has been characterized by a polarized 'musicological' and 'sociological' approach also typical of popular musicology.

=== Music theory, analysis and composition ===
Music theory is a field of study that describes the elements of music and includes the development and application of methods for composing and for analyzing music through both notation and, on occasion, musical sound itself. Broadly, theory may include any statement, belief or conception of or about music (Boretz, 1995). A person who studies or practices music theory is a music theorist.

Some music theorists attempt to explain the techniques composers use by establishing rules and patterns. Others model the experience of listening to or performing music. Though extremely diverse in their interests and commitments, many Western music theorists are united in their belief that the acts of composing, performing and listening to music may be explicated to a high degree of detail (this, as opposed to a conception of musical expression as fundamentally ineffable except in musical sounds). Generally, works of music theory are both descriptive and prescriptive, attempting both to define practice and to influence later practice.

Musicians study music theory to understand the structural relationships in the (nearly always notated) music. Composers study music theory to understand how to produce effects and structure their own works. Composers may study music theory to guide their precompositional and compositional decisions. Broadly speaking, music theory in the Western tradition focuses on harmony and counterpoint, and then uses these to explain large scale structure and the creation of melody.

=== Music psychology ===
Music psychology applies the content and methods of psychology to understand how music is created, perceived, responded to, and incorporated into individuals' and societies' daily lives. Its primary branches include cognitive musicology, which emphasizes the use of computational models for human musical abilities and cognition, and the cognitive neuroscience of music, which studies the way that music perception and production manifests in the brain using the methodologies of cognitive neuroscience. While aspects of the field can be highly theoretical, much of modern music psychology seeks to optimize the practices and professions of music performance, composition, education and therapy.

=== Performance practice and research ===
Performance practice draws on many of the tools of historical musicology to answer the specific question of how music was performed in various places at various times in the past. Although previously confined to early music, recent research in performance practice has embraced questions such as how the early history of recording affected the use of vibrato in classical music or instruments in Klezmer.

Within the rubric of musicology, performance practice tends to emphasize the collection and synthesis of evidence about how music should be performed. The important other side, learning how to sing authentically or perform a historical instrument is usually part of conservatory or other performance training. However, many top researchers in performance practice are also excellent musicians.

Music performance research (or music performance science) is strongly associated with music psychology. It aims to document and explain the psychological, physiological, sociological and cultural details of how music is actually performed (rather than how it should be performed). The approach to research tends to be systematic and empirical and to involve the collection and analysis of both quantitative and qualitative data. The findings of music performance research can often be applied in music education.

== Education and careers ==
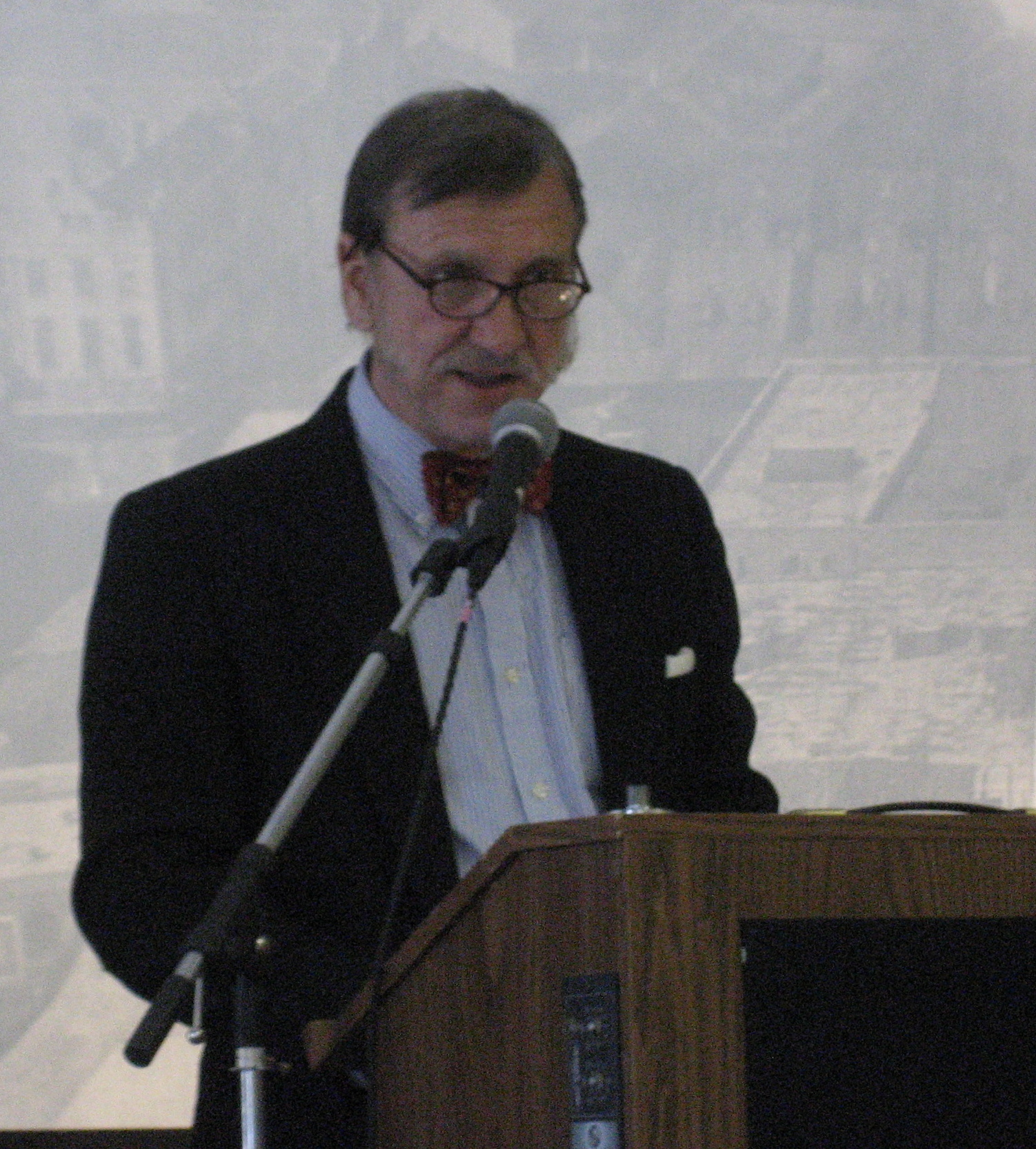
Music historian Jack Stewart lectures at a conference.

Musicologists in tenure track professor positions typically hold a PhD in musicology. In the 1960s and 1970s, some musicologists obtained professor positions with an MA as their highest degree, but in the 2010s, the PhD is the standard minimum credential for tenure track professor positions. As part of their initial training, musicologists typically complete a BMus or a BA in music (or a related field such as history) and in many cases an MA in musicology. Some individuals apply directly from a bachelor's degree to a PhD, and in these cases, they may not receive an MA. In the 2010s, given the increasingly interdisciplinary nature of university graduate programs, some applicants for musicology PhD programs may have academic training both in music and outside of music (e.g., a student may apply with a BMus and an MA in psychology). In music education, individuals may hold an M.Ed and an Ed.D.

Most musicologists work as instructors, lecturers or professors in colleges, universities or conservatories. The job market for tenure track professor positions is very competitive. Entry-level applicants must hold a completed PhD or the equivalent degree and applicants to more senior professor positions must have a strong record of publishing in peer-reviewed journals. Some PhD-holding musicologists are only able to find insecure positions as sessional lecturers. The job tasks of a musicologist are the same as those of a professor in any other humanities discipline: teaching undergraduate and/or graduate classes in their area of specialization and, in many cases some general courses (such as Music Appreciation or Introduction to Music History); conducting research in their area of expertise, publishing articles about their research in peer-reviewed journals, authors book chapters, books or textbooks; traveling to conferences to give talks on their research and learn about research in their field; and, if their program includes a graduate school, supervising MA and PhD students, giving them guidance on the preparation of their theses and dissertations. Some musicology professors may take on senior administrative positions in their institution, such as Dean or Chair of the School of Music.

== Notable journals ==
- 19th-Century Music (1977–present)
- Acta Musicologica (1928–2014) (International Musicological Society)
- Asian Music (1968–2002)
- BACH: Journal of the Riemenschneider Bach Institute (1970–present)
- Black Music Research Journal (1980–2004)
- Early Music History (1981–2002)
- Ethnomusicology (1953–2003) (Society for Ethnomusicology)
- Journal of Music Theory (1957–2002)
- The Journal of Musicology (1982–2004)
- Journal of the American Musicological Society (1948–present) (American Musicological Society)
- Journal of the Royal Musical Association
- Journal of the Society for American Music
- Musica Disciplina (1946–present)
- Music Educators Journal (1934–2007)
- Music Theory Spectrum (1979–present) (Society for Music Theory)
- The Musical Quarterly (1915–present)
- Perspectives of New Music (1962–present)
- The World of Music (1957−present)
- Yearbook for Traditional Music (1981–2003)

== Famous musicologists ==
Famous musicologists include John Sullivan Dwight, Ludwig Ritter von Köchel, and Ludwig Nohl. John Sullivan Dwight was best known for founding Dwight's Journal of Music, expanding the works of Beethoven to the American public, and writing the lyrics of O Holy Night into English. Ludwig Ritter von Köchel was best known for developing the Köchel catalogue, which categorized all of Mozart's works in chronological order. Ludwig Nohl was best known for discovering and publishing one of Beethoven's most famous pieces Für Elise. Nohl was one of the most famous musicologists in Europe during the 1800s and published biographies on Haydn, Mozart, Beethoven, Liszt, and Wagner.

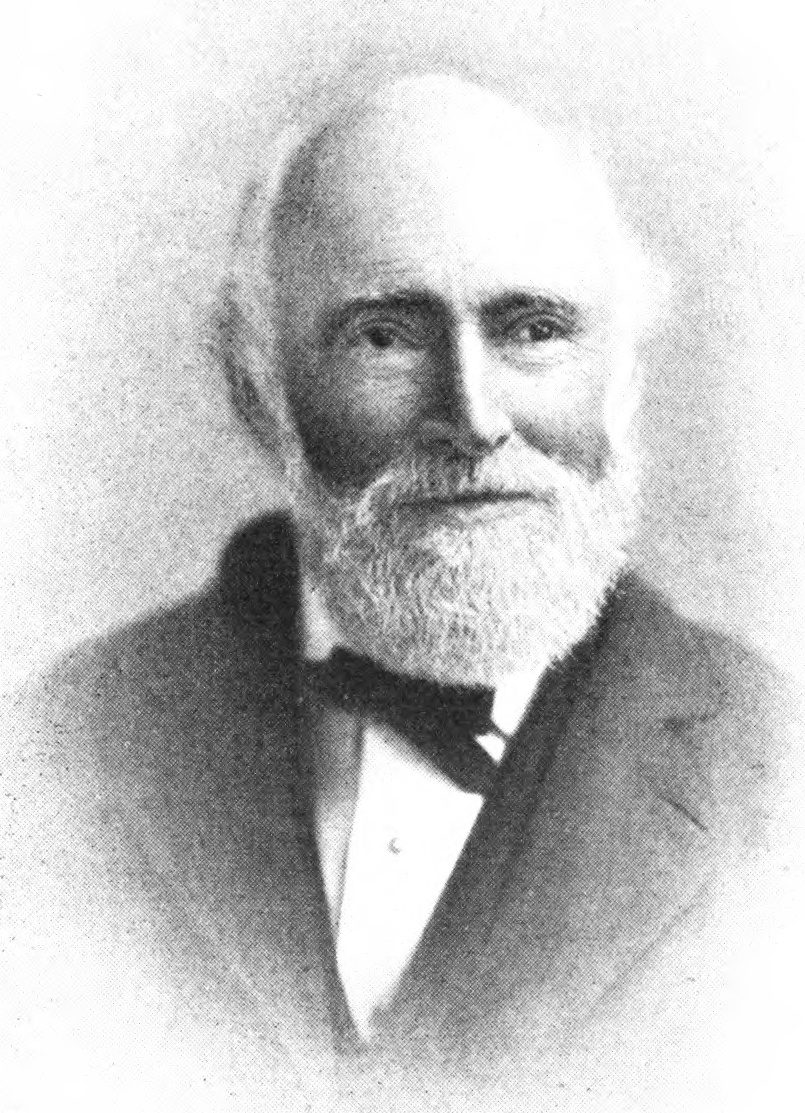
Portrait of John Sullivan Dwight

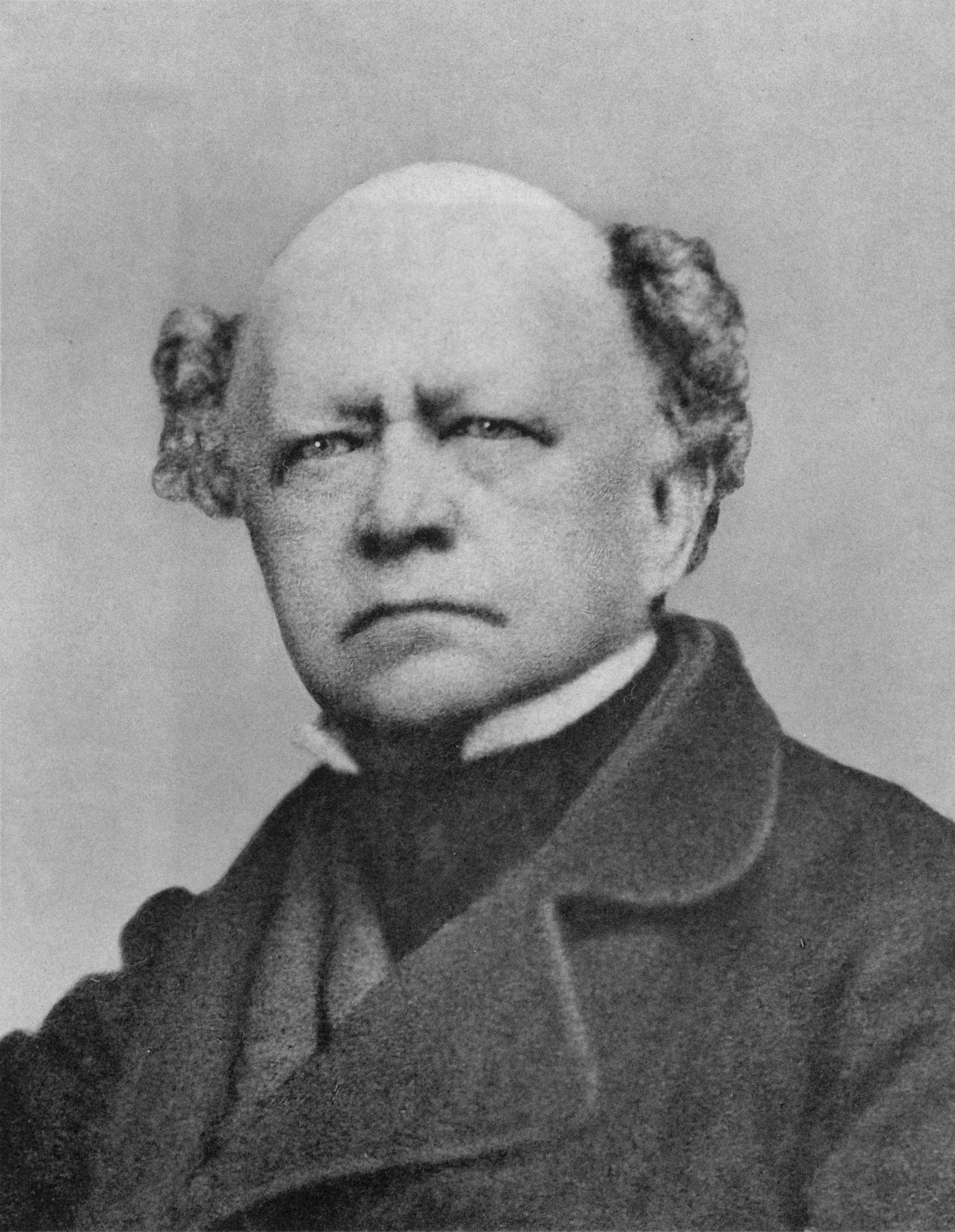
Portrait of Ludwig Ritter von Köchel

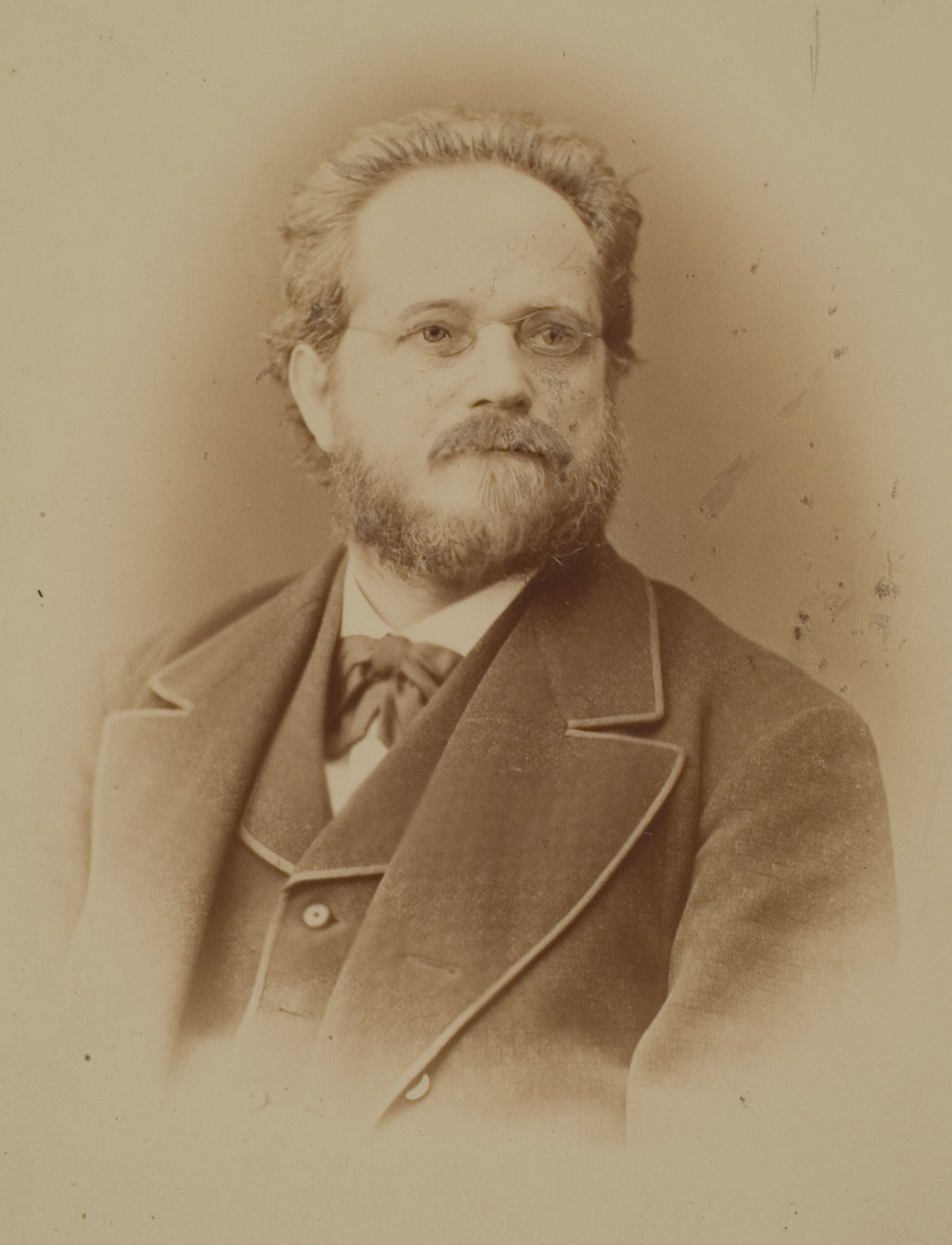
Portrait of Ludwig Nohl

== Women in music ==
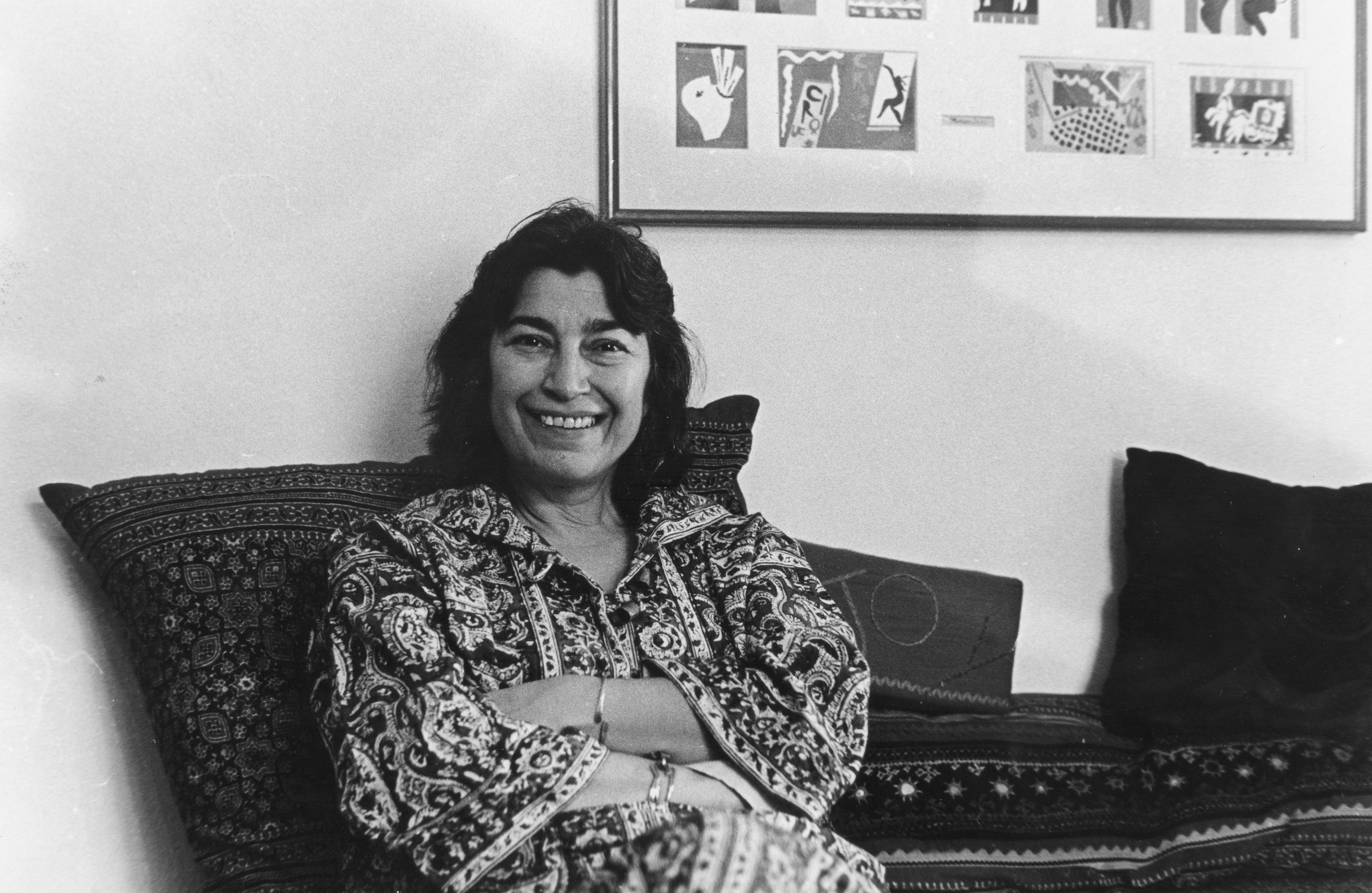
Rosetta Reitz (1924–2008) was an American jazz historian who established a record label producing 18 albums of the music of the early women of jazz and the blues.

The vast majority of major musicologists and music historians from past generations have been men, as in the 19th century and early 20th century; women's involvement in teaching music was mainly in elementary and secondary music teaching. Nevertheless, some women musicologists have reached the top ranks of the profession. Carolyn Abbate (born 1956) is an American musicologist who did her PhD at Princeton University. She has been described by the Harvard Gazette as "one of the world's most accomplished and admired music historians".

Susan McClary (born 1946) is a musicologist associated with new musicology who incorporates feminist music criticism in her work. McClary holds a PhD from Harvard University. One of her best known works is Feminine Endings (1991), which covers musical constructions of gender and sexuality, gendered aspects of traditional music theory, gendered sexuality in musical narrative, music as a gendered discourse and issues affecting women musicians.

Other notable women scholars include:

- Eva Badura-Skoda
- Margaret Bent
- Anna Maria Busse Berger
- Adrienne Fried Block
- Jane M. Bowers
- Marcia Citron
- Suzanne Cusick
- Sandra Jean Graham
- Ursula Günther
- Maud Cuney Hare
- Amelia Ishmael
- Tammy L. Kernodle
- Liudmila Kovnatskaya
- Gundula Kreuzer
- Elizabeth Eva Leach
- Ottalie Mark
- Pirkko Moisala
- Carol J. Oja
- Jeannie G. Pool
- Rosetta Reitz
- Elaine Sisman
- Hedi Stadlen
- Rose Rosengard Subotnik
- Judith Tick
- Anahit Tsitsikian
- Sherrie Tucker
- Helen Walker-Hill

== See also ==
- Aesthetics of music
- Choreomusicology
- Computational musicology
- List of musicologists
- List of musicology topics
- Music and emotion
- Music and mathematics
- Musical analysis
- Musical escapism
- Musical temperament
- Musical tuning
- Prehistoric music
- Psychoanalysis and music
- Scale (music)
- Set theory (music)
- Sociomusicology
- Tonality
- World music
- Virtual Library of Musicology
