= Tammy L. Kernodle =

American musicologist

Tammy L. Kernodle is an American musicologist and a former president of the Society for American Music (2019–21). Her academic writing and public intellectual work has highlighted Black women musicians like Mary Lou Williams, Meshell Ndegeocello, Alice Coltrane, and Melba Liston and has considered African-American women's role in contemporary gospel music and jazz.

== Education ==
Kernodle holds a BM in choral music education and piano from Virginia State University, and an MA and PhD in music history from Ohio State University.

== Career ==
Kernodle has been professor of musicology at Miami University in Oxford, Ohio, since 1997. In 2018, she was awarded the Benjamin Harrison Medallion in recognition of "Outstanding Contribution to the Education of the Nation", and in 2021 she was awarded the title of University Distinguished Professor. Kernodle served as the president of the Society for American Music from 2019 to 2021. In 2021, with Lisa Barg, Dianthe Spencer, and Sherrie Tucker, Kernodle formed the Melba Liston Research Collective whose members work toward "the inclusion of women musicians and analyses of gender in the emerging jazz historiographical directions of 'new' jazz studies".

Her book, Soul on Soul: The Life and Music of Mary Lou Williams, has been reviewed by Sherrie Tucker for Women and Music: A Journal of Gender and Culture, Chris J. Walker for JazzTimes, and Edward M. Komara for the Music Library Association's quarterly Notes.

Kernodle has contributed to NPR's "Turning the Tables" series (2019) and to the Walker Art Center's digital exhibit "Creative Black Music". She has appeared in several documentaries about the history of jazz, including The Girls in the Band (2011), Mary Lou Williams: The Lady Who Swings the Band (2015), and Miles Davis: Birth of the Cool (2019).

She has been quoted or interviewed as an expert for The New York Times, NPR's All Things Considered, and Marketplace.

== Selected works ==
=== Books ===
- Kernodle, Tammy L. (2020) [2004]. Soul on Soul: The Life and Music of Mary Lou Williams. Urbana: University of Illinois Press. OCLC 1142759993.

=== Articles ===
- Kernodle, Tammy L. (2006). “Work the Works: The Role of African American Women in the Development of Contemporary Gospel”. Black Music Research Journal, 26 (1): 89–109.
- Kernodle, Tammy L. (2013). "Diggin' You Like Those Ol' Soul Records: Meshell Ndegeocello and the Expanding Definition of Funk in Postsoul America". American Studies. 52 (4):181–204. doi:10.1353/ams.2013.0109 ISSN 2153-6856.
- Kernodle, Tammy L. (2014). "Black Women Working Together: Jazz, Gender, and the Politics of Validation". Black Music Research Journal. 34 (1): 27–55. doi:10.5406/blacmusiresej.34.1.0027.
- Kernodle, Tammy L. (2020). “Beyond the Chord, the Club, and the Critics: A Historical and Musicological Perspective of the Jazz Avant-Garde,” in Creative Black Music at the Walker: Selections from the Archives, ed. Danielle A. Jackson and Simone Austin, Vol. IV of the Living Collections Catalogue (Minneapolis: Walker Art Center).
- Contributions to Grove Dictionary of American Music:
  - Kernodle, Tammy L. (2012-10-04). "American Spiritual Ensemble, the". Oxford University Press, doi:10.1093/gmo/9781561592630.article.a2227070.
  - Kernodle, Tammy L. (2015-09-22). "Black Arts Movement". Oxford University Press. doi:10.1093/gmo/9781561592630.article.a2283957.
  - Kernodle, Tammy L. (2012-10-04). "Civil Rights Movement". Oxford University Press. doi:10.1093/gmo/9781561592630.article.a2228003.
  - Kernodle, Tammy L. (2014-09-03). "Fountain, Clarence". Oxford University Press. doi:10.1093/gmo/9781561592630.article.a2266885.
  - Kernodle, Tammy L. (2013-10-16). "Gospel blues". Oxford University Press. doi:10.1093/gmo/9781561592630.article.a2249651.
  - Kernodle, Tammy L. (2013-02-11). "International Sweethearts of Rhythm". Oxford University Press. doi:10.1093/gmo/9781561592630.article.a2235311.
  - Kernodle, Tammy L. (2013-07-25). "Lucas, Nick". Oxford University Press. doi:10.1093/gmo/9781561592630.article.a2242205.
  - Kernodle, Tammy L. (2014-01-31). "Odetta". Oxford University Press. doi:10.1093/gmo/9781561592630.article.a2257735.
  - Kernodle, Tammy L. (2014-09-03), "Rivers, Father Clarence (Rufus) Joseph". Oxford University Press. doi:10.1093/gmo/9781561592630.article.a2267562.
  - Kernodle, Tammy L. (2014-01-31). "Williams, Mary Lou". Oxford University Press. doi:10.1093/gmo/9781561592630.article.a2259377.
  - Kernodle, Tammy L. (2014-01-31). "Winans Family, the". Oxford University Press. doi:10.1093/gmo/9781561592630.article.a2259409.

=== Edited books ===
- Encyclopedia Of African American Music. (2011). Edited by Emmett George Price, Tammy L. Kernodle, and Horace Joseph Maxile. Santa Barbara: Greenwood Press. OCLC 699474764.
