= Prairie View Co-eds =

American all-female band

The Prairie View Co-eds were an all-female band that formed in the 1940s at the historically black Prairie View A&M University. The band formed in response to more and more males being drafted into the armed forces. The Prairie View Co-eds' success soon spread past the limits of their college campus though, and they were soon touring and traveling much of the year.

== Beginnings ==
In the early 1940s, Prairie View College was one of the leading African American colleges in the country, and one of the only four-year public schools African Americans could attend in Texas. The band that dominated the campus was the Prairie View Collegians, an all-male group that played gigs on campus as well as some touring. When she arrived at the school, the skilled Bert Etta Davis auditioned for the Prairie View Collegians and was accepted by the band leader. A talented alto saxophonist, Davis ended up being turned away from the band by the Dean of Women who found the concept of a woman playing in an all-men's band too scandalous to allow.

By 1943, the times had changed. The Prairie View Collegians had lost many members to the draft, and lacked the numbers to continue making strong performances. Will Henry Bennett (Note: Will Henry Bennett (né Henry William Benjamin Bennett, Jr.; born 6 September 1907 Charleston, South Carolina – died 20 March 1980 Houston, Texas)) began to make a move to start an all-female dance band, possibly in response to having seen The International Sweethearts of Rhythm. The band was a hodge-podge of talent its first year. The group did draw some talented players like Davis, but also recruited from people to whom playing was just an extracurricular activity. They also relied on music majors to fill spots and pick up new instruments that no one had been trained on. This group was not merely a collection of beginners, though. While the original venues of the Co-eds were campus parties and events, it was not very long before they began to be invited off-campus. With most men's orchestras having disbanded, The Prairie View Co-eds filled a need. A chaperone followed the band to their destinations in order to make sure the reputation of these educated young women would not be sullied.

== Growth ==
After its first year of popularity, the Prairie View Co-eds began to make a name for themselves. Through word of mouth, the tale of a skilled collegiate all-female band spread, and soon talented musicians were actively coming to Prairie View College in order to join the Co-eds. This marked a distinct shift from extracurricular activity performed casually to a greater focus on musicianship as a career for these women. The Co-eds went on more serious tours, often taking a teacher and a chaperone with them. Soon summer and winter tours were also established, and the Prairie View Co-eds were functioning like professionals. This group was championed by the Black press as symbols of successful, educated African American women who seemed to be representative of a patriotic spirit. The Prairie View Co-eds were even able to perform at USO shows. Their performance marked a success for black military personnel who were often excluded from the entertainment white soldiers received. The Co-eds played to black and white soldier audiences, meaning that African American soldiers were not just getting the entertainment they were so often denied, but they were also getting the performance from an African American group.

The Prairie View Co-eds also engaged in rather extreme tours during the summer months. They were constant professionals and worked with the Moe Gale Agency, Gale being the owner of the Savoy Ballroom. Touring was difficult during this time period as many problems were encountered with the rationing that occurred because of the war. Gas and rubber for tires were rationed, and oftentimes the only reason the Co-eds had access to ration coupons for these items was because of their work with the USO. Touring seemed to be worth it though, as the Prairie View Co-eds were able to perform at venues such as the Apollo Theater. The fact that they were listed as Co-eds was important too, as it confirmed them as symbols of educated African Americans, as well as being youthful and attractive.

== Sources ==
- Tucker, Sherrie. "The Prairie View co-eds: Black college women musicians in class and on the road during World War II." Black Music Research Journal (1999): 93–126. JSTOR 779276
- Tucker, Sherrie. Swing Shift: "All-Girl" Bands of the 1940s. Duke University Press, 2000.
- Tucker, Sherrie. "Uplifts and Downbeats: What if Jazz History Included the Prairie View Co-eds?." Berkeley Electronic Press (2002).
- Tucker, Sherrie. "Women." The New Grove Dictionary of Music and Musicians, (2nd ed.), Barry Dean Kernfeld (ed.).
- Handy, Dorothy Antoinette (née Miller; 1929–2002). Black women in American bands and orchestras. Scarecrow Press, 1998.
