= The Sunday Times Travel Magazine =

British travel magazine

- May 2014 cover
- Editor: Ed Grenby
- Deputy Editor: Nick Redman
- Features Editor Commissioning Editor: Katie Bowman; Jill Starley-Grainger
- Categories: Travel
- Frequency: Monthly
- Circulation: 60,106
- Founded: 2003
- First issue: February 1, 2003
- Company: News UK
- Country: United Kingdom
- Based in: London
- Language: English
- Website: sundaytimestravel.co.uk
- ISSN: 1479-2559
- OCLC: 226159811

The Sunday Times Travel Magazine was a monthly British travel magazine. Although part of the same company (News UK) as the weekly The Sunday Times travel section, its content was entirely different. The magazine published travel information, features, competitions, offers, and photography. It was established in February/March 2003 as a bi-monthly magazine, changing to a monthly frequency in 2005. As of 2014, the magazine had a limited online presence, with less than 5% of its content available to view online. The remaining 95% was published exclusively in print. The magazine's last issue was October 2020.

== Editors ==
The editors-in-chief of the magazine were:

- 2005 to 2020 present: Ed Grenby
- 2004: Jane Knight
- 2003: Brian Schofield

== Awards ==
The magazine has won the following awards:

- Travel Magazine of the Year 2013, 2012, Travel Press Awards
- Best Travel Magazine, 2012, 2011 British Travel Awards
- Editor of the Year 2009 Lifestyle Magazines category: Ed Grenby, Editor, British Society of Magazine Editors Awards
- Editor of the Year, 2006, Contract Magazines category: Ed Grenby, Editor, British Society of Magazine Editors Awards
- Editor of the Year 2006, 2005: Ed Grenby, Editor, Magazine Design and Journalism Design Awards
- Writer of the Year, 2011: Nick Redman, Deputy Editor, Professional Publishers Association Awards

== Content ==
The magazine included regular editorial sections, which include The Knowledge (practical insider advice), Instant Escapes (detailed city and regional guides), The Big Trip (long features), Tips from the Top (celebrity travel), and Hotlist (news and trends), among others.
