= Kernodle =

Kernodle is a surname. Notable people with the surname include:

- Don Kernodle (1950–2021), American wrestler
- Jeremy Kernodle (born 1976), American judge
- Tammy L. Kernodle, American musicologist
