= Gabriel Banat =

Romanian-born, American violinist, conductor, and musicologist (1926 - 2016)

Gabriel Banat or Gábor Bánát (born surnamed Hirsch; September 23, 1926 – July 23, 2016) was a Romanian-born American classical violinist, conductor and musicologist.

== Biography ==
Banat grew up in a Jewish and German-speaking family in Timișoara, Romania. In 1942 the family moved to Budapest and was trained at Franz Liszt Academy of Music as a concert violinist after being heard by Bela Bartok and Ede Zathureczky. In 1944, he became a protege of Georges Enescu, with whom he later toured in the US.

In 1946, Banat, a stage name, which seems to have to do with Banat of Temeswar, came to the U.S. after WWII and cooperated with Nathan Milstein. Performing since the age of twelve as a soloist on several continents, Banat taught violin at Smith College. He conducted the Westchester Conservatory Orchestra and other ensembles near Dobbs Ferry, where he lived. In 1970 he joined the New York Philharmonic, then under Pierre Boulez. A passion for original sources resulted in his discovery (in Poland) of the holographs of Mozart's violin concertos, missing from Berlin since 1941, which he then published in facsimile.

Earlier, he compiled an edited Masters of the Violin, a six-volume collection of works by lesser seventeenth- and eighteenth-century composers. The third volume of that series was devoted to the violin concertos of the Chevalier de Saint-Georges, one of which Banat premiered in New York and Tokyo. A 1990 monograph on that composer in Black Music Research Journal, and the Saint-Georges entry in the New Grove, 2000, and in the Dictionary of Black Composers, led to a book and a movie.

Banat owned and performed on two violins by Stradivarius: The 1682 “ex-Hill,” now called the “Banat” and the “Pingrillé” dated 1713. One was sold to the Amsterdam Concertgebouw Orchestra and used by Liviu Prunaru. Banat retired in 1993. At the end of his life he lived in Begur, Catalonia, which is where he died.

== Works ==
- Banat, Gabriel (2006). The Chevalier de Saint-Georges: Virtuoso of the Sword and the Bow. Hillsdale, New York: Pendragon Press. ISBN 978-1-57647-109-8.
- Banat, Gabriel (1990). "The Chevalier de Saint-Georges, Man of Music and Gentleman-at-Arms, the Life and Times of an Eighteenth Century Prodigy". Black Music Research Journal. 10 (2). Chicago: Columbia College: 177–212. doi:10.2307/779385. JSTOR 779385.
- Mozart's Violin Concerti: A Facsimile Edition of the Autographs (Calla Editions)
- Masters of the Violin Volume 1: Six Violin Concertos and Sixty-Four Cadenzas
- Works for the violin (Masters of the violin / edited by Gabriel Banat)
