= Trazee Travel USA =

Travel information website

- Founded: September 2014; 12 years ago
- Headquarters: Yardley, Pennsylvania, {{{location_country}}}
- Founder: Francis X. Gallagher
- Products: Travel website
- Website: www.trazeetravel.com

Trazee Travel is a website that offers travel information targeting travelers under the age of 40. It is a division of FXExpress Publications, Inc., based in Yardley, Pennsylvania, which also owns Global Traveler and whereverfamily.com. It organizes the annual Trazee awards. It was launched in 2014.
