= Musical escapism =

Psychological and cognitive detachment via music

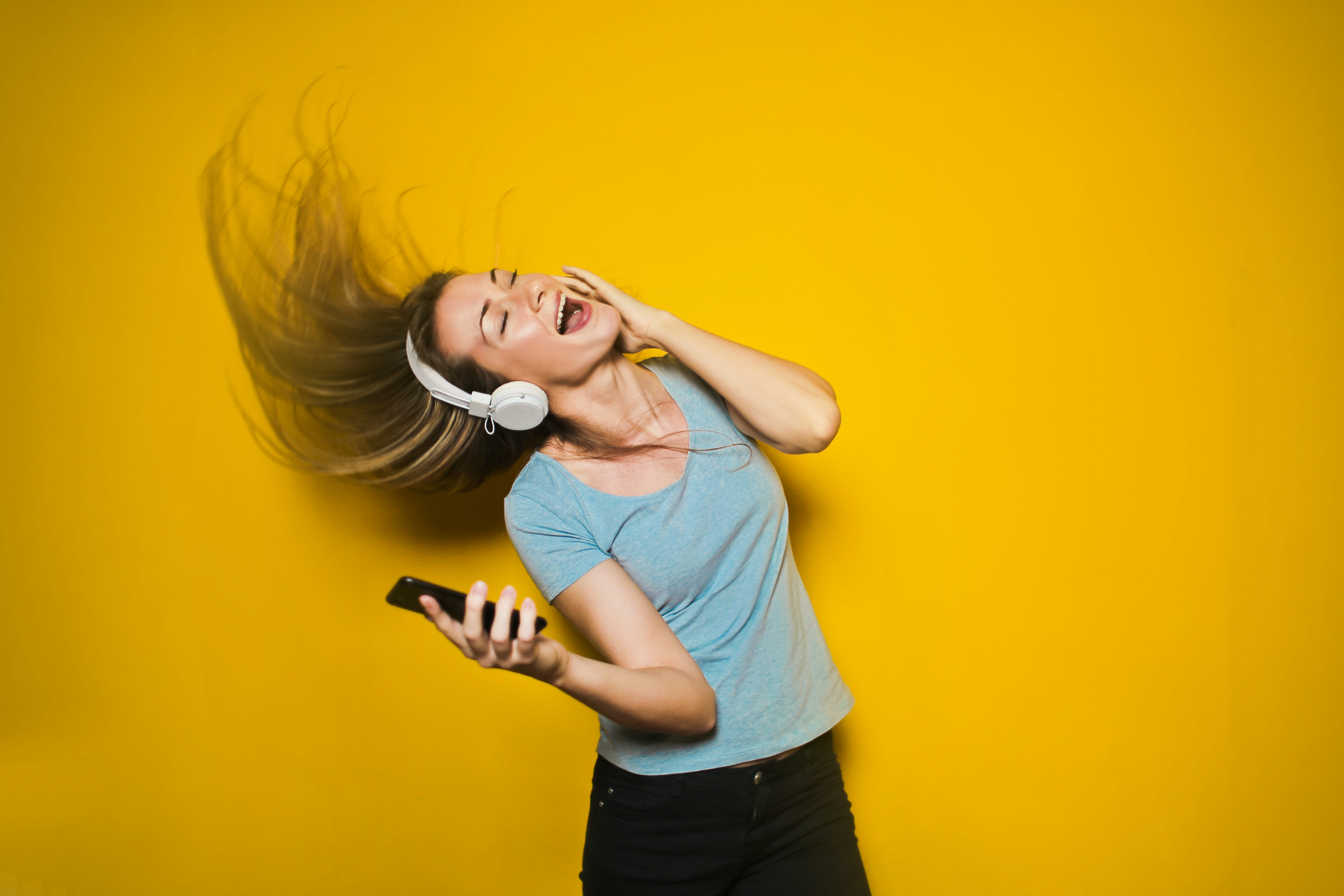
A woman listening to music with her headphones

Musical escapism is a psychological phenomenon characterized by the use of music to elicit vivid daydreams and imaginative scenarios, facilitating a temporary disconnection from immediate surroundings. It is characterized by immersive, music-induced daydreaming. This practice, a subset of the broader concept of escapism, involves active cognitive engagement, wherein listeners become participants in self-constructed narratives inspired by and synchronized with musical stimuli. The term was coined by Dorsa Rohani at the University of Toronto.

== Background ==
=== Variety of daydreaming ===
Musical escapism exists on a spectrum, ranging from casual, brief episodes to more immersive, prolonged experiences. The phenomenon primarily serves as a medium for entertainment and creative expression or distraction to cope with subconscious stressors and anxieties. However, it is not entirely confined to those seeking solace from adversity; rather, it is a diverse phenomenon with broad appeal, engaging individuals across various life circumstances and psychological states. It involves constructing vivid, imaginative scenarios synchronized with the auditory experience. These mental constructs may include self-projections, original characters, or adaptations of existing fictional entities within various contexts. The scenarios can range from purely fantastical narratives to idealized representations of real-life situations.

=== The Five-Dimensional Model of Musical Escapism ===
Musical escapism is a complex phenomenon that comprises five interrelated dimensions: cognitive, emotional, neurological, contextual, and motivational. This is known as the Five-Dimensional Model of Musical Escapism (FDME). According to Rohani, these five dimensions work in concert with one another. The cognitive dimension includes immersive daydreaming, narrative complexity, and temporal displacement. Catharsis, emotional intensity, and mood regulation are all part of the emotional dimension. The neurological dimension entails the dopaminergic response, neural synchronization, and reward circuit activation. The contextual dimension consists of environmental factors, sociocultural influences, and technological mediation, and the motivational dimension is made up of coping mechanisms, identity expression, and creative outlets.

== Neurological and psychological foundations of musical escapism ==
It has been demonstrated that the psychological phenomena of musical escapism is driven by neurological and psychological factors. By employing neuroimaging methods including positron emission tomography scans and function magnetic resonance, researchers from The Neuro at McGill University were able to discover the neural basis of musical stimulation. The study showed that the music activates the brain's reward system, which is demonstrated by the release of dopamine. Researchers discovered that the dopaminergic response happens both in anticipation of and during the experience of pleasurable music listening. Data shows an increase of up to nine-percent of dopamine release during the anticipation of pleasurable music and up to six-percent at peak emotional arousal during music listening. Researchers say that the neurochemical evidence suggests that music can regulate human emotions and behavior by influencing the release of dopamine, which can be used as a strategy to manage stress, improve mood and potentially be used as therapeutic tools for mental health disorders.

== Musical escapism as a psychological coping mechanism ==
According to a 2021 International Federation of the Phonographic Industry survey, 68-percent of Generation Z respondents use music for mood enhancement. The American Psychological Association (APA) finds that increasing economic burdens, academic challenges, and evolving social behaviors have created a complex mix of stressors impacting younger generations. Rising anxiety, depression, and stress levels in the early 21st century have contributed to the surge of musical escapism as a coping mechanism, particularly Generation Z and Millenials. These generations have been raised alongside digital technology and music streaming services making musical escapism an accessible and personalized form of stress relief. The 2020 national survey conducted by the APA found that nearly 1 in 5 adults reported their mental health was worse than in the previous year. Gen Z adults reported the worse mental health at 34-percent, followed by Gen X at 21-percent, Millenials at 19-percent, boomers at 12-percent, and older adults at eight-percent.

During the COVID-19 pandemic, a study from the International Federation of the Phonographic Industry found that 87-percent of respondents reported that music improved their emotional well-being, and 75-percent of respondents said music gave a sense of normalcy.

== Musical escapism in media ==
Musical escapism is not officially recognized as a mental disorder, and has attracted significant attention from social media outlets since 2020. Around the same time, a trend known as "reality shifting" appeared on TikTok. This trend, similar to intense daydreaming and frequently set to music, became an extremely prevalent internet phenomenon.

== Musical escapism vs. maladaptive daydreaming ==
Maladaptive daydreaming is a psychological condition marked by excessive and immersive fantasies that interfere with daily functioning, leading to concentration difficulties, social withdrawal, and neglect of responsibilities. In contrast, musical escapism is a controlled psychological response to music driven by emotion and occasionally subconscious stress, typically without impairing daily life.

The primary differences between maladaptive daydreaming and musical escapism lie in the nature of the activity, degree of control, and individual impact. Maladaptive daydreaming involves uncontrollable and immersive fantasy, leading to significant functional impairment and distress, whereas musical escapism is a controlled activity that generally influences and is influenced by emotional well-being, and can have both positive and negative psychological effects.

== Limitations to musical escapism ==
While studies have shown than musical escapism can be beneficial to mental health, there are limitations. Music may play a role in mood regulation and enhance positive emotions but its effects are short-lived. Individuals with mental health conditions such as generalized anxiety disorder or post-traumatic stress disorder should acknowledge that the use of music to escape provides temporary relief and is not a substitute for professional help. Music therapy and other types of mental health treatment are recommended to be taken through an experienced counselor with background and training in the field.

== See also ==
- Absorption (psychology)
- Dissociation (psychology)
- Escapism (disambiguation)
- Fantasy-prone personality
- Musicology
