= Artisans of Leisure =

Luxury travel company

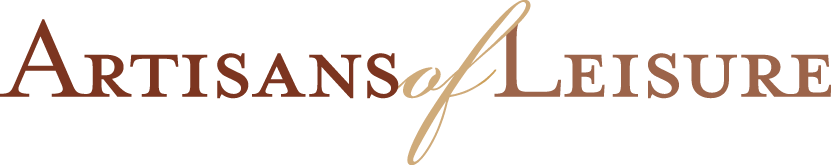
- Type: Private
- Industry: Travel, Tour operator, Tourism, Hospitality
- Founded: 2003
- Headquarters: New York City, United States
- Products: Private luxury tours
- Website: www.artisansofleisure.com

Artisans of Leisure is a luxury travel company offering private cultural tours in international destinations. The company offers tours in 70 countries on six continents.

== History ==
Artisans of Leisure was founded in 2003 by Ashley Isaacs Ganz. Food & Wine magazine has named Ganz a luxury travel “tastemaker,” and Departures magazine featured Ganz in their "Explorers" issue.

Artisans of Leisure has been ranked the Best Tour Operator in the World in Travel + Leisure magazine's World's Best Awards and has appeared on the Top Tour Operators list in the Travel + Leisure World’s Best Awards readers’ survey multiple times.

Condé Nast Traveler magazine regularly selects Artisans of Leisure for their list of Top Travel Specialists. Artisans of Leisure was ranked second in the Condé Nast Traveller magazine Readers' Choice Awards 2020.

Robb Report has named Artisans of Leisure founder and CEO Ashley Ganz a Master of Luxury in their list of Travel Masters in 2023, 2024, 2025 and 2026.

Rolling Stone magazine gave Artisans of Leisure the Best Tour Operator award in 2024 and 2025 and Coolest Tour Operator award in 2026.

Men's Journal magazine awarded Artisans of Leisure the Best Luxury Tour Operator in their 2026 Travel Awards.

In their annual survey that rates travel companies according to client satisfaction, quality of service, sustainability, education, and other criteria, National Geographic Adventure magazine named Artisans of Leisure one of the best luxury travel outfitters in the world. National Geographic Traveler has named the company's tours to their 50 Tours of a Lifetime in multiple years. Trade publication Recommend said, “Travel industry insiders go as far as saying that Artisans of Leisure hasn’t merely raised the bar when it comes to private touring—they claim Artisans of Leisure is the bar.”

The company's tours have been listed in the Condé Nast Traveler magazine Dream List repeatedly. Artisans of Leisure tours have been recommended by The New York Times, Condé Nast Traveler, Travel + Leisure, Forbes, NBC’s Today show, CNN, Frommer's, Fodor’s, and other major newspapers, magazines, guidebooks, affluent market studies and trade publications.

== Products and services ==
Artisans of Leisure specializes in luxury Foreign Independent Travel (FIT) and arranges tours with a cultural focus in 70 countries.

The company also offers special-interest tours focusing on various themes, such as culinary tours, family tours, art and architecture tours, active travel, garden tours, tours for travelers with food allergies and dietary restrictions, and religious heritage tours. The company also designs one-of-a-kind international honeymoons and offers a honeymoon registry.

Artisans of Leisure is noted for incorporating specialized experiences into their tours, such as philanthropic activities, specialized shopping excursions, special lessons and classes such as Japanese tea ceremony and Italian cooking, and innovative activities for families, couples and groups of friends.
