= Escapist =

Escapist may refer to:

- Escapist, a person engaged in the act of escapism
- Escapist fiction

== Books ==
- The Escapists, novel by Alexander Fullerton 1972

== Comics and games ==
- The Escapist (website), a role-playing-games advocacy website
- The Escapist (magazine), an online magazine
- The Escapist (character), a comic book character
- The Escapists, a 2015 video game

== Film and TV ==
- The Escapist (1983 film), starring escape artist Bill Shirk
- The Escapist (2002 film), directed by Gillies MacKinnon
- The Escapist (2008 film), directed by Rupert Wyatt

== Music ==
- The Escapist (album) a 1996 album by Stephen Cummings
- "The Escapist" (1998), an album by Phil Western
- "The Escapist", hidden track on Coldplay's 2008 album Viva la Vida or Death and All His Friends
- "The Escapist", a single from The Streets' 2008 album Everything Is Borrowed
- "Escapist", a song by Nightwish on their album Dark Passion Play
- "Escapist", a song by Oceans Ate Alaska on their album Hikari

== See also ==
- Escapism (disambiguation)
- Escapist fiction
- Escapologist
- New Escapologist
