= Escapism (disambiguation) =

Escapism is a mental diversion or "escape" from the perceived unpleasant or banal aspects of daily life.

Escapism may also refer to:

- Escapism (album), a 2013 album by Danish recording artist Fallulah
- "Escapism" (song), by British singer-songwriter Raye, 2022
- Escapism Travel Magazine, a New York-based travel publication
- "Escapism", a 2005 song by Japanese band Antic Cafe
- Escapism, a fictional social movement to escape the Solar System from an invading alien species, in the science fiction novel The Dark Forest

== See also ==
- Escapist (disambiguation)
