= Stuart Levine (academic) =

American academic (1932 – 2016)

Stuart George Levine (May 25, 1932 – October 29, 2016) was an American academic focusing on American literature.

Born in New York City, Levine was educated at Harvard University and Brown University. He joined the University of Kansas in 1958 and remained their until his retirement. Levine published several short stories and wrote academic works focusing on the writer Edgar Allan Poe.

== Early life and education ==
Stuart George Levine was born in Brooklyn on May 25, 1932. His parents were Max and Jean Levine, owners of a haberdashery in Hempstead, New York.

In 1954, Levine received his undergraduate degree from Harvard University, where he was a member of the Phi Beta Kappa.honor society. He then attended Brown University, receiving an MA in 1956 and a PhD in 1958. While there, he began an interest in Edgar Allan Poe, with both his MA thesis and doctoral dissertation focusing on the writer.

== Academic career ==
After leaving Brown University, Levine joined the department of American Studies at the University of Kansas in 1958. He retired from the university in 1992.

== Writing career ==
In 1960, Levine founded the journal American Studies. He remained its primary editor for thirty years.

In 1972, Levine published a criticism of Poe's works titled Edgar Poe: Seer and Craftsman. In 2004, Levine and his wife Susan edited a version of Poe's Eureka: A Prose Poem and published it through the University of Illinois Press.

=== Fiction ===
Levine was a prominent writer of short stories, publishing them in magazines including Chicago Review, New Mexico Humanities Review and South Dakota Review. In 1994, he published a collection of short stories titled The Monday-Wednesday-Friday Girl and Other Stories.

In 2012, Levine self-published a mystery novel called Killing in Okaraygua. He had begun writing a sequel to the book prior to his death.

== Personal life ==
On June 6, 1963, Levine married Susan Fleming Matthews in Minneapolis, Minnesota. They had met two years prior after Levine enrolled in a Spanish language course which she was teaching. Matthews later served as assistant dean in the Graduate School of Brown University. Levine and his wife had a daughter and two sons.

Levine was a founding member and French horn player in the Lawrence Woodwind Quintet. As a student, he was a member of the Rhode Island Philharmonic Orchestra.

=== Death ===
Levine died on October 29, 2016. He was buried in Beni Israel Cemetery in Eudora, Kansas.
