= Bert Etta Davis =

American jazz musician (1923–1982)

Bert Etta Davis, also known as Birdie Davis or Lady Bird (December 12, 1923 – January 28, 1982) was an American alto saxophonist.

== Life and career ==
Bert Etta Davis was born in San Antonio, Texas on December 12, 1923. She was educated at Prairie View College where in her freshman year she successfully auditioned for the all-male school band, Prairie View Collegians, in 1940. The college's dean of women intervened and banned her from taking her spot in the group. She was not able to play in a band at the school until 1943 when an equivalent women's band, the Prairie View Co-eds, was established. Will Henry Bennett was the bandleader for both school ensembles.

Davis played in the Prairie View Co-ed until it was dissolved in 1946. After this she played in another women's band led by Bennett whose roster of performers included tenor saxophonist Margaret Backstrom and jazz drummer Helen P. Cole. Bennett left the group in 1947, and Tiny Davis became its leader. As Tiny Davis & Her Orchestra, the group made several records for Decca in 1949, including "Race Horse" and "How about that Jive". Outside of records, Tiny's band was billed as the Hell-Divers.

Davis continued to perform in Tiny's band until 1951 when she moved to Chicago. There she was the bandleader of her own all-male ensemble before becoming a member of five-member group led by Memphis Slim. She then joined the touring band backing Dinah Washington with whom she was a frequent featured soloist. While playing for Washington, she earned the moniker Lady Bird which was a name chosen by Dinah.

Davis continued performing in nightclubs in Chicago after leaving Washington's band in the late 1950s. For part of her career she performed with Charlie Parker. In 1964, she spent a year living and working in Sweden in a group led by pianist Meritt Hemengeon. After returning to Chicago in 1965, she led her own band in that city, Ladybird Band, and also performed in an organ trio.

In 1970, Davis returned San Antonio to care for her ailing parents. She lived there for the rest of her life and was active in San Antonio's jazz and gospel music scene. Her church in San Antonio, St Paul United Methodist Church, embraced her talents and she played the Offertory at most Sunday services. To supplement her income in San Antonio, she worked for that city's branch of the Salvation Army. In 1980, she was a featured performer at the Women's Jazz Festival in Kansas City, Missouri. She also performed with the Houston-based jazz group, Ad Lib, in her later life.

Davis died in San Antonio on January 28, 1982.
