= Brian Schofield =

British travel writer

Brian Schofield is a British travel writer, literary critic and educator. His work has appeared in The Sunday Times, The Independent on Sunday, GQ, Arena, Condé Nast Traveller and the New Statesman. In 2003, he won the best British Travel Writer covering North America. His first book, published in 2008, is called Selling Your Father’s Bones and follows the 1877 exodus of the Nez Perce Native American tribe through Oregon, Wyoming, Idaho and Montana. Schofield spent three months travelling through the American Northwest in a 1983 Dodge Camper van to research the book. His second book, Listening to the Elders, is a global journey through the role of older people in different societies and traditions. Now Head of Sixth Form at Hurstpierpoint College, West Sussex, he continues to write middle-grade historical fiction.
