= Wanderlust (magazine) =

British travel magazine

- Cover of 30th anniversary issue (December 2023–January 2024)
- Editor in Chief: Georgios Kipouros
- Categories: Travel magazine
- Frequency: Bi-monthly
- Circulation: 76,864
- Publisher: Wanderlust Travel Media
- Founder: Paul Morrison; Lyn Hughes
- Founded: 1993 Windsor, United Kingdom
- Company: Wanderlust Travel Media
- Country: UK
- Based in: London
- Language: English
- Website: wanderlust.co.uk
- ISSN: 1351-4733

Wanderlust is a UK based independent travel magazine, first published in 1993. It is the oldest travel magazine still in circulation in the UK and Europe and has the largest circulation of any UK travel magazine according to ABC. Wanderlust focuses on lesser-visited destinations, unique experiences, and responsible travel. The magazine is published in print and digital formats bi-monthly with the strap-line "taking the road less travelled".

Wanderlust is led by entrepreneur Georgios Kipouros as editor-in-chief and produced in London. The magazine includes features on off-the-beaten-track travel; sustainable, alternative destinations; and authentic, experiential trips. The Wanderlust website includes archives from backdated editions alongside travel articles.

== Awards ==
Travmedia Travel Magazine of the Year 2020

Travel Media Awards Consumer Publication of the Year Print 2020

Special Interest Magazine/Brand of the Year at the Professional Publishers Association (PPA) Awards

== History ==
Wanderlust was established in Windsor, Berkshire in 1993 by Paul Morrison and Lyn Hughes, who had observed the absence of a publication combining their interests in wildlife, activities and cultural insights. Wanderlust was privately purchased in January 2021 by Kipouros - a former AI entrepreneur - with Hughes remaining on board as founding editor, frequently hosting travel events and speaking on Wanderlust: Off The Page podcast.

Wanderlust features travel photography, and for the past 26 years it has hosted the Wanderlust Travel Photo of the Year competition which is the largest amateur photography competition in the UK.

The Wanderlust Reader Travel Awards are chosen by readers who vote for their favourite destinations. Each year, the awards are held in London. The 2021 Wanderlust Reader Travel Awards were hosted by naturalist Steve Backshall at Kensington Palace, and in 2022 the ceremony took place at the Tower of London hosted by author and television presenter Simon Reeve.

Wanderlust began The World Guide Awards in 2005, with gold, silver, and bronze awards presented to guides based on testimonies and review from tourists.
