= Today's Traveller =

Indian monthly travel magazine

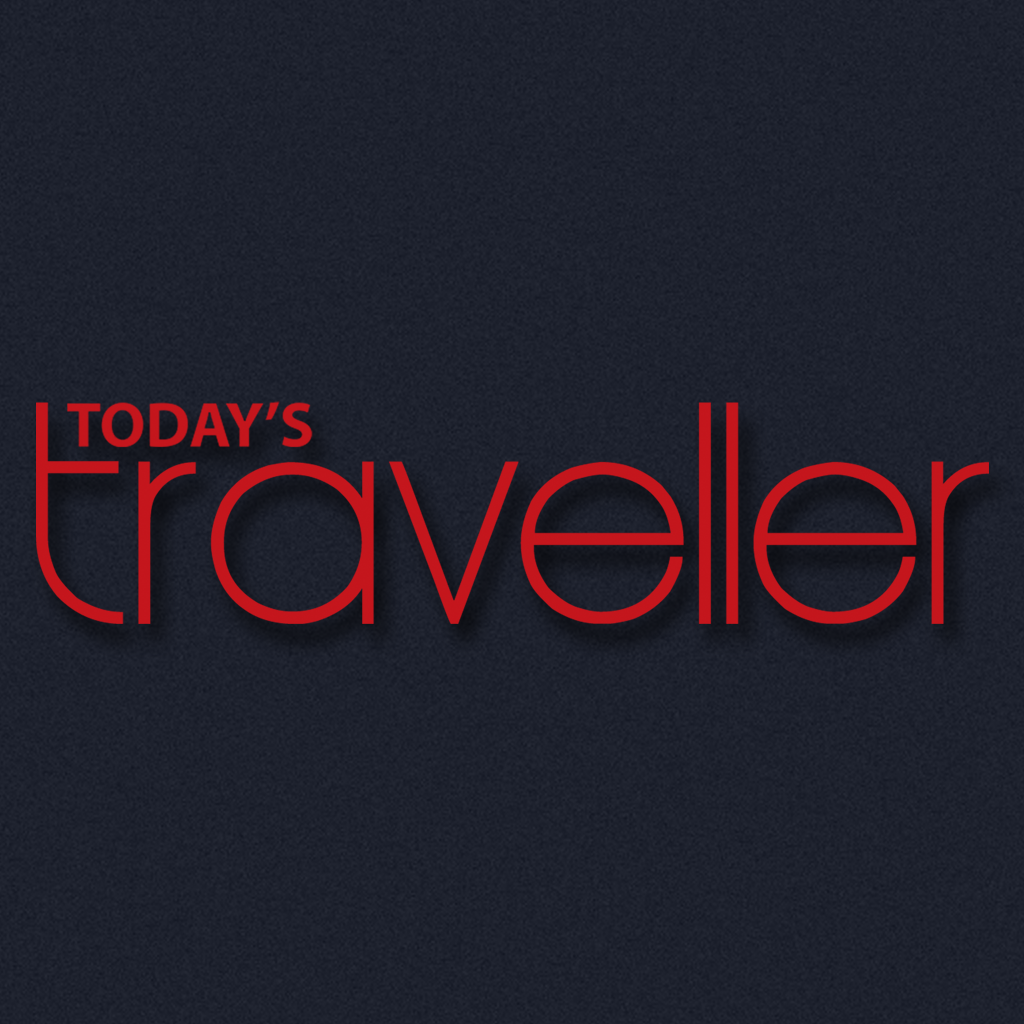

- Executive editor and Managing director: Kamal Gill
- Categories: Travel
- Publisher: Gill India Group
- First issue: August 1997
- Country: India
- Based in: New Delhi
- Language: English
- Website: Official website

Today's Traveller (TT) is an Indian monthly travel magazine published since 1997. Based in New Delhi.
