= Women in music education =

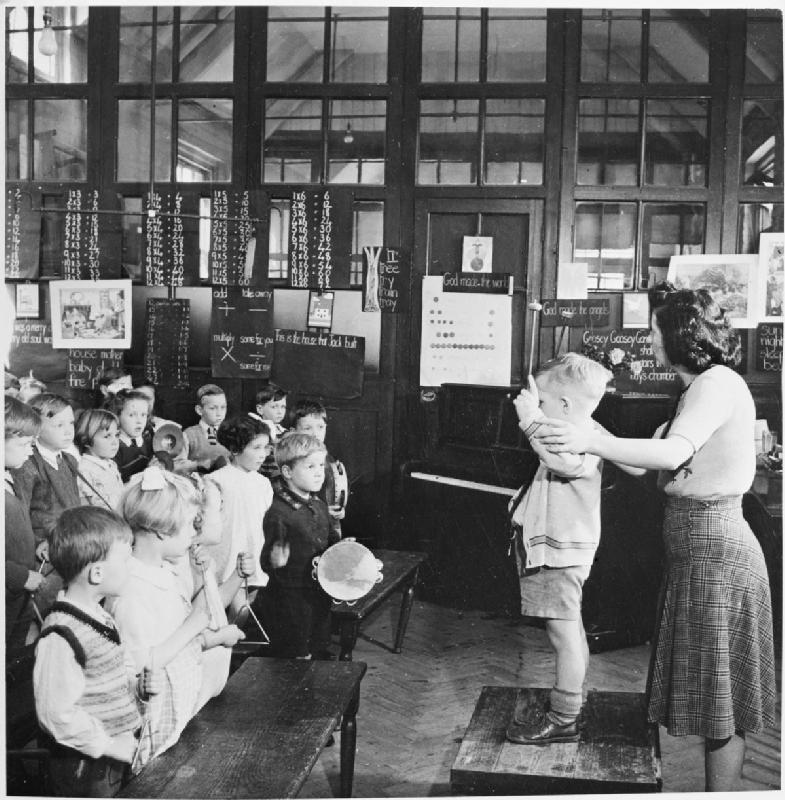
A music teacher leading a music ensemble in an elementary school in 1943

Women in music education describes the role of women musicians, conductors, teachers and educational administrators in music education at the elementary school and secondary education levels. While music critics argued in the 1880s that "...women lacked the innate creativity to compose good music" due to "biological predisposition", later, it was accepted that women would have a role in music education, and they became involved "...to such a degree that women dominated music education during the later half of the 19th century and well into the 20th century." "Traditional accounts of the history of music education [in the US] have often neglected the contributions of women, because these texts have emphasized bands and the top leaders in hierarchical music organizations." When looking beyond these bandleaders and top leaders, women had many music education roles in the "...home, community, churches, public schools, and teacher-training institutions" and "...as writers, patrons, and through their volunteer work in organizations."

== Nineteenth and Early Twentieth Century ==
Musicologist Megan Lam has noted a connection between the marginalization of women in music education and western society at large, writing, "Even as activities for women in the 19th century continued to be restricted to household and domestic chores, contributions by women to music and music education remained 'confined to the home, young children, and women’s organizations and institutions.'" Despite the limitations imposed on women's roles in music education in the 19th century, women were accepted as kindergarten teachers, because this was deemed to be a "private sphere." Women also taught music privately, in girl's schools, Sunday schools, and they trained musicians in school music programs. By the turn of the 20th century, women began to be employed as music supervisors in elementary schools, teachers in normal schools and professors of music in universities. Women also became more active in professional organizations in music education, and women presented papers at conferences.

A woman, Frances Clarke (1860–1958) founded the Music Supervisors National Conference in 1907. While a small number of women served as President of the Music Supervisors National Conference (and the following renamed versions of the organization over the next century) in the early 20th century, there were only two female Presidents between 1952 and 1992, which "[p]ossibly reflects discrimination." After 1990, however, leadership roles for women in the organization opened up. From 1990 to 2010, there were five female Presidents of this organization. Women music educators "outnumber men two-to-one" in teaching general music, choir, private lessons, and keyboard instruction. More men tend to be hired as for band education, administration and jazz jobs, and more men work in colleges and universities. According to Dr. Sandra Wieland Howe, there is still a "glass ceiling" for women in music education careers, as there is "stigma" associated with women in leadership positions and "men outnumber women as administrators."

== Impacts of Social Media ==
Social media platforms such as Facebook, Instagram, Twitter, and YouTube have made it possible for women in music education to display their talents and publicize the work they have long been doing. These platforms could serve as inspiration to women and girls aspiring to be involved with music and music education. According to Megan Lam, “...with the rise of social media and interconnectedness through the Internet, female and male musicians alike can reach audiences like never before and students are thus able to witness talents from all over the world.” An important aspect of social media is that the poster is in control of what is being displayed. Female musicians and educators are now able to promote themselves without having to rely on a gatekeeper. For example, in The Instrumentalist, Heather McWilliams found that "women were represented in the magazine far less than what would be proportionate to the current number of women working in the band field and “'qualitative findings revealed that females were often depicted in disparaging and stereotypical ways”' Social media can alleviate some of these problems due to self representation.

== Discrimination against Women in Music Education ==
The discrimination against women in music education goes far beyond a fight for equal pay. According to Cheryl Jackson, "Women encountered discrimination through limited access to such privileges as departmental vote, applying for promotion and tenure, serving on committees that determined departmental policies, and teaching upper level courses for which their academic training had prepared them." Women are also more likely to be educators in low-income areas. According to Elisa Jones, "the vast majority of band directors at large, public high schools in high income areas are male. In fact, 84.62%…In contrast, at small, private elementary schools in low income areas, 83.66% of general classroom music teachers in our universe are female!”

The discrimination against women in music education often starts at an early age. According to Kelly Gathen, “While researchers suggest that instrument choice should be based on timbre and personal preference, gender stereotypes and biases play a more prominent role. These stereotypes and biases intensify with age, leading to a disproportionately small percentage of female high school music educators." The lack of female educators means a lack of female role models. This cycle leads to fewer women at the more prestigious levels of music education field (Gathen).

== Notable individuals ==
- Julia Crane (1855–1923) was an American music educator who set up a school, the Crane School of Music in Potsdam, New York, which was the first school specifically for the training of public school music teachers. She is among the most important figures in the history of American music education. Crane was a student of Manuel García. Crane was inducted into the Music Educators Hall of Fame in 1986. As of 2015, the Crane School of Music is one of three schools which make up the State University of New York (SUNY) at Potsdam. It has 630 undergraduate and 30 graduate students and a faculty of 70 teachers and professional staff.
- Frances Clarke (1860–1958) was a music supervisor in the Milwaukee Public School system. She founded the Music Supervisors National Conference in 1907. It was an organization of American music educators dedicated to advancing and preserving music education as part of the core curriculum of schools in the United States. In 2011, it was renamed the National Association for Music Education and it had more than 130,000 members. and in March 2012, Professor Glenn Nierman was elected President-Elect of NAfME.
- Elsie Shaw (1866–1962) was a music supervisor in St. Paul, Minnesota. She supervised and taught elementary school teachers and conducted choirs and orchestras. She encouraged the offering of music education at the high school level.
- Satis Coleman (1878–1961), who taught at Teachers College, Columbia University and Lincoln Lab School in the 1920s and 30s, created a popular method for teaching music creatively. She published many books that were foundational to music education, ethnomusicology, and out-of-school music scholarship. Her pedagogy involved field trips, instrument construction (often of non-Western instruments), and improvisation, and her philosophy had spiritual and ecological aspects.
- Mabelle Glenn (1881-1969) was a music supervisor in Bloomington, Indiana and a director of music in Kansas City, Missouri. She wrote music appreciation books and music textbooks. She was President of the Music Supervisors National Conference from 1928–1930.
- Lilla Pitts (1884–1970) graduated from Northwestern University. She was a faculty member of the teacher's college at Florida State University. She served as President of the Music Educators National Conference (the new name for the Music Supervisors National Conference) from 1942–1944.
- Marguerite Hood (1903–1992) graduated from the University of Southern California. She was a supervisor of music for Montana, a faculty member at the University of Montana, the University of Southern California and the University of Michigan. She was President of the Music Educators National Conference from 1950–1952. She was the first woman to be appointed as chair of the Music Educators Journal.
- Marjorie Kisbey Hicks (1905-1986) studied at the Associated Royal Conservatory of Music in Canada. She was a faculty of the Ontario Ladies' College
- Frances Andrews (1908–1976) received her Masters and Doctorate from Pennsylvania State University, where she was a faculty member from 1943 to 1973. She was President of the Music Educators National Conference from 1970–1972.
- Dulcie Holland (1913-2000) was an Australian music educator who studied at the Sydney Conservatory and the Royal Conservatory of Music.
- Minuetta Kessler (1914-2000) was an American composer who studied at and taught at the Juilliard School. She was president of the North East Pianoforte Teachers Association and president of the Massachusetts MTA.
- Ruth Shaw Wylie (1916-1989) studied and taught at Wayne State University, where she also founded and directed the Improvisation Chamber ensemble. She also studied at the Eastman School of Music.
- Mary Hoffman (1926–1997) graduated with a bachelor's degree in science from Lebanon Valley College and a Masters from Columbia Teachers College. She was a music supervisor in Milwaukee and Philadelphia. She gave graduate courses at Columbia Teachers College, Temple University and the University of Illinois. She wrote and contributed to textbooks. She was President of the Music Educators National Conference from 1980–1982.
- Dorothy Straub (born 1941) graduated with Bachelors and master's degrees in music education from Indiana University. She was the music coordinator for Fairfield Public Schools in Connecticut. She was a violinist in two orchestras. She was given awards from the ASTA and the National School Orchestra Association. She was President of the Music Educators National Conference from 1992–1994.
- Carolynn Lindeman (born 1940) graduated from Oberlin College Conservatory of Music, the Mozarteum Academy, San Francisco State University and Stanford University, where she received her Doctor of Musical Arts. She was a professor at San Francisco State University from 1973 to 2005. She was President of the Music Educators National Conference from 1996–1998. She edited the "Strategies for Teaching" series. She "[a]cknoledge[d] discrimination in academia."
- June Hinckley (1943–2007) graduated with a PhD from Florida State University. She was a music and fine arts supervisor in Brevard County in Florida. She wrote articles on music education. She was President of the Music Educators National Conference from 1998–2000.
- Jean Hasse (1958) was an American teacher. She studied at Oberlin College and Cleveland State, and she formed the company Visible Music.
- Eunice Boardman (1964) studied at Cornell College, Teachers College of Columbia University, and the University of Illinois at Urbana-Champaign. She was given the title professor emerita of the University of Illinois at Urbana-Champaign. She also taught at Northern Illinois University, Wichita State University, and the University of Wisconsin-Madison.
- Lynn Brinckmeyer received her PhD from the University of Kansas. She was an Associate Professor and Director of Choral Music Education at Texas State University. She was President of the Music Educators National Conference from 2006–2008.
- Barbara Geer graduated from the University of North Carolina. She was a music consultant for a school system in North Carolina. She was President of the Music Educators National Conference from 2008–2010.
- Patricia Shehan Campbell teaches at the University of Washington. She was the president of the College Music Society.
- Mackie V. Spradley graduated from the University of North Texas. She was President of the National Association for Music Education from 2020-2022. She was also the chair of the first Equity Committee and established the Equity Leadership Institute.
