= Sports+Travel Hong Kong =

- Editor-in-Chief: Aaron K. Stewart
- Frequency: Bi-Monthly
- Publisher: Mario Rosario
- Company: Sports and Travel Limited Hong Kong
- Country: Hong Kong
- Based in: Hong Kong
- Language: English
- Website: sportsandtravel.com.hk

Sports + Travel Hong Kong is a free travel magazine based in Hong Kong and targeted at English readers. It is published bi-monthly.
