= Escapism Travel Magazine =

- Categories: Travel
- Publisher: Saul Kuperstein
- First issue: September 1, 2008
- Company: SanMax Publishing
- Country: United States
- Language: English
- Website: www.escapismmagazine.com

Escapism Travel Magazine is a travel magazine based in New York City, United States.

Published twice a year, it has 250,000 readers, according to its corporate media kit.

== Content ==
The magazine emphasizes luxury travel, ecotourism and cultural heritage.

Articles offer information on new, emerging destinations, coastal tourism, food, design, and style.

The magazine is published by SanMax Publishing.

== See also ==
- Get Lost Magazine
