= American Studies (journal) =

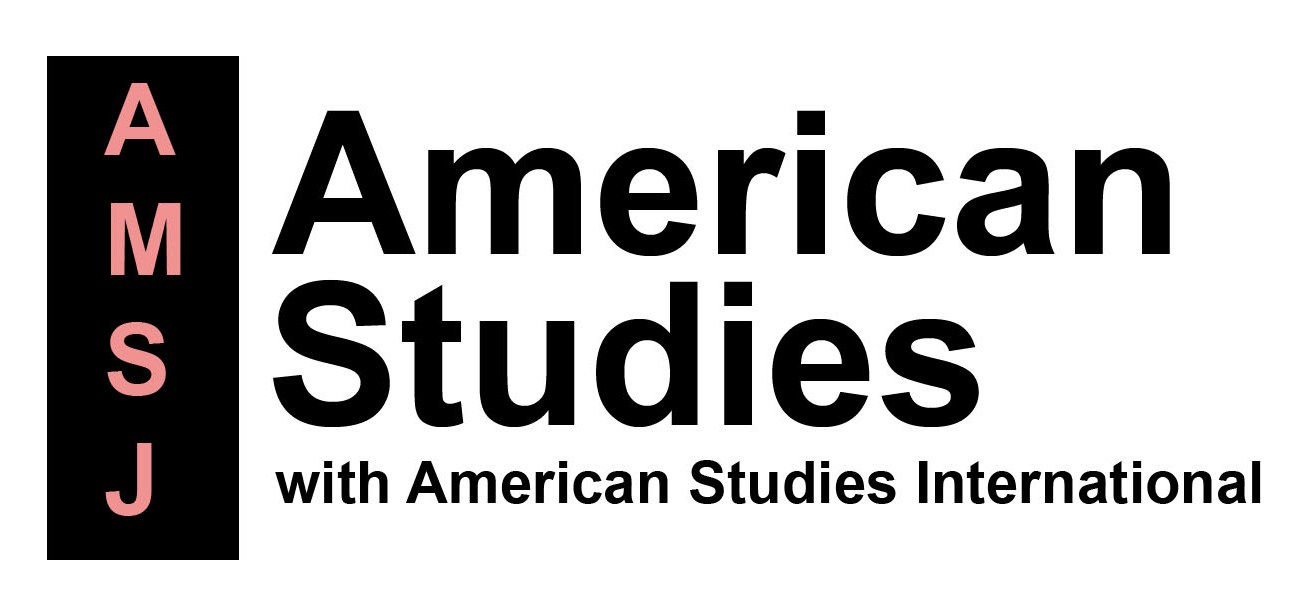
- Discipline: American studies
- Language: English
- Edited by: Sherrie Tucker, Christopher Perreira

Publication details
- History: 1960–present
- Publisher: Mid-America American Studies Association, University of Kansas, University of Minnesota (United States)
- Frequency: Quarterly

Standard abbreviations
- ISO 4: Am. Stud.

Indexing
- ISSN: 0026-3079 (print); 2153-6856 (web)
- LCCN: 72620984
- JSTOR: 00263079
- OCLC no.: 00818197

Links
- Journal homepage; Online access; Online archive; Online access at Project MUSE

American Studies (AMSJ) is a quarterly peer-reviewed academic journal which covers issues broadly concerning American culture, history, literature, and politics through international perspectives. The journal is sponsored by the Mid-America American Studies Association, the University of Kansas, and the University of Minnesota. The American Studies editorial board is made up of 46 members from 38 institutions in 7 countries.

== History ==
The American Studies journal was first published in 1959 under its original name, the Journal of the Central Mississippi Valley American Studies Association. In 1962, it became known as the Midcontinent American Studies Journal. Since 1971, the journal has been called American Studies and has been published by the ASA's regional chapter, the Mid-America American Studies Association. In 2005, the tri-annual journal became a quarterly publication. This was in part due to a merger with American Studies International (ASI), which ceased publication in 2004, and marked a commitment to internationalizing the editorial board and increasing the presence of scholarship produced outside the United States, as well as a commitment to continue the teaching-focused features that had been sustained by ASI.

In 2005, the journal merged with American Studies International. In 2022, a partnership with the Department of American Studies at the University of Minnesota was formed. The editorial staff includes: editors-in-chief Sherrie Tucker and Christopher Perreira. In 2020, American Studies revamped the journal's blog as Dialogues: Blog of the American Studies Journal, which has been edited by Nishani Frazier since 2022.

American Studies has a U.S. circulation of roughly 1,200 and an international circulation averaging around 500. The journal is available open-source, with a rolling embargo of 3 years. The journal is available in full text through the following databases: JSTOR, Project Muse, ProQuest, and EBSCO. American Studies uses a double-anonymous peer-review process.

== Special Issues ==
Each year, American Studies publishes a special issue that concerns a single theme of interest in the field and is managed by a guest editor or a team of editors.

== Editorship Timeline ==
Name	Institution	Year	First Issue	Year	Last Issue
Stuart Levine	University of Kansas	1960	Vol. 1, No.1	1989	Vol. 30, No.2
Elizabeth Schultz*	University of Kansas	1979	Vol. 20, No. 1	1980	Vol. 20, No.2
Timothy Miller*	University of Kansas	1982	Vol. 23, No.2	1985	Vol. 26, No.1
William Graebner*	State University of New York, Fredonia	1995	Vol. 36, No.2	2004	Vol. 45, No.3
Norman R. Yetman	University of Kansas	1991	Vol. 32, No.2	2009	Vol. 50, No.3-4
David M. Katzman**	University of Kansas	1979	Vol. 20, No.1	2010	Vol. 51, No.3-4
Sherrie Tucker	University of Kansas	2006	Vol. 47, No.1	N/A	N/A
Randal Maurice Jelks	University of Kansas	2008	Vol. 49, No.1-2	2022	Vol. 61, No.1
Christopher Perreira*	University of Kansas/University of California, San Diego	2020	Vol. 59, No.2	N/A	N/A

* includes years as associate status or guest editor

**associate from 1979 - 1988
