= Condé Nast Traveller =

British travel magazine (founded 1997)

- Cover of the December 2024 issue
- Editor: Divia Thani
- Categories: Travel magazine
- Total circulation: 78,428 (Jan–June 2013)
- Founded: 1997
- Company: Condé Nast
- Country: United Kingdom
- Based in: London
- Language: English
- Website: www.cntraveller.com
- ISSN: 1368-597X

Condé Nast Traveller is a British travel magazine published by Condé Nast. The magazine is aimed at readers interested in travel, with an emphasis on high-end and independent experiences.

The publication differs from the American edition primarily through the spelling of its name and the inclusion of original content tailored to a UK readership. Some features may be adapted from the American edition to suit the British market.

== History ==
Condé Nast Traveller was launched in 1997, with Sarah Miller serving as its first editor. As of 2025, the Editorial Director is Divia Thani, and the Publishing Director is Simon Leadsford.

In August 2018, the UK and US editions were brought under a single editorial structure led by Thani.

== Awards ==
Condé Nast Traveller organises several annual awards, including the Readers' Awards, Readers' Spa Awards, the Gold List (luxury hotels), and the Hot List (notable new hotels). The publication has also hosted Innovation and Design Awards recognising achievements in travel and design, attended by figures such as Paul Smith, Anish Kapoor, and Richard Rogers.

By 2007, the magazine had received multiple industry awards, including the PPA Consumer Lifestyle Magazine of the Year.

== See also ==
- Condé Nast
- Travel literature
- Magazine publishing
