= Maui Nō Ka ʻOi Magazine =

Hawaii regional magazine

- Categories: Regional magazine
- Frequency: Bimonthly
- Company: Haynes Publishing Group
- Country: United States
- Based in: Wailuku, Hawaii
- Language: English
- Website: www.mauimagazine.net

Maui Nō Ka ʻOi Magazine is a bi-monthly regional magazine published by the Haynes Publishing Group in Wailuku, Hawaii.

The phrase Maui nō ka ʻoi means "Maui is the best" in the Hawaiian language. Maui Nō Ka ʻOi Magazine features stories relating to the culture, art, dining, environmental issues, current events, recreational activities, and local businesses within Maui County. The magazine is marketed at newsstands across the United States and by subscription, and is distributed as an in-room amenity in resorts.

Since 2002 the magazine has sponsored the ʻAipono Awards, an annual award in which readers select their favorite restaurants in 25 categories. In 2003 they began celebrating the winners at an annual banquet. Proceeds from the banquet go to the Maui Community College's Culinary Academy.

Maui Nō Ka ʻOi has a circulation of 25,000 and an estimated readership of 1.44 annually. The magazine has received several Paʻi awards, which are given out by the Hawaii Publishers Association.
