= Travel in Taiwan =

English-language bimonthly magazine

Travel in Taiwan (traditional Chinese: 中華民國觀光月刊; simplified Chinese: 中华民国观光月刊) is a Taiwanese English-language bimonthly magazine. It is produced in Taipei by Vision International Publishing Co., Ltd. on behalf of Taiwan's Tourism Bureau, an agency of the country's Ministry of Transportation and Communications. The magazine, which is free and designed to encourage foreign tourists to visit Taiwan, includes information on many aspects of traveling on the Pacific island.

Recent issues have been about 60 pages long, each with around 10 feature articles, a culture & art segment, a calendar of upcoming events, travel news, and a small amount of advertising, including a listing of select hotels. Articles are often accompanied by small maps, helpful info on accommodation, restaurants, and public transport, as well as a list of terms and place names in English and Chinese.

== History ==
The English-language magazine Travel in Taiwan was formed in 1986 from the merger of two magazines: the 11-year-old China Business and Industry Tourism Magazine (Chinese: 中國工商旅遊雜誌) and the 18-year old government publication News Letter. The Tourism Bureau tasked the owners of China Business and Industry Tourism Magazine with creating the merged magazine. The signing ceremony took place in July 1986 and was presided over by Yu Wei (Chinese: 虞為), the Tourism Bureau's director. Jiang Lichun (Chinese: 蔣麗純) became the founding publisher, while Wei Boru (Chinese: 魏伯儒) became the founding editor-in-chief. Scheduled to be published on 1 August 1986, the inaugural issue was printed on A4 paper.

Travel in Taiwan is produced by Vision International Publishing Company and is free. The magazine had a monthly circulation of 18,000 in 1987 and was delivered to locations inside and outside Taiwan. Copies were sent to hotels frequented by tourists, tour operators, and journalists. The magazine was publishing monthly in 2001 but had switched to being bimonthly by 2011. Its editor-in-chief in 2021 was the German emigrant Johannes Twellmann, an over two-decade resident of New Taipei City.

== Content ==
The first issue of Travel in Taipei in August 1986 featured the Northeast Coast National Scenic Area, the Ghost Festival, the Shilin Night Market, Yingge ceramics. In addition to teaching readers about Taiwan, Chinese cuisine and Chinese relics, the inaugural issue had tourism news, maps, interviews, and a reference guide for foreign tourists. Arranged under several themes, the magazine's articles cover the arts, stage shows, museums, festivals, restaurants, sports, and shopping. It has listings of entertainment, cultural, and arts events that are happening in the next month. For Taiwanese who are planning to travel abroad, the magazine provides content directed to them.

== Commentary ==
The Sydney Morning Herald's Michael Gebicki praised the magazine in a 1997 article. He wrote, "The usual suspects—arts, culture, dining, festivals, museums, sports and shopping—are canvassed in a colourful and concise format which offers some imaginative suggestions for travellers. The section on Taiwanese food is particularly illuminating, and illustrated with scrumptious photos."
