= Music Educators Journal =

- Discipline: Music education
- Language: English
- Edited by: Corin Overland

Publication details
- History: 1914–present
- Publisher: SAGE Publications on behalf of the National Association for Music Education
- Frequency: Quarterly

Standard abbreviations
- ISO 4: Music Educ. J.

Indexing
- ISSN: 0027-4321 (print); 1945-0087 (web)
- LCCN: 94095753
- OCLC no.: 422008967

Links
- Journal homepage; Online access; Online archive

The Music Educators Journal is a quarterly peer-reviewed academic journal that covers the field of education. The editor-in-chief is Ella Wilcox, and the academic editor is Corin Overland (University of Miami). It was established in 1914 and is currently published by SAGE Publications on behalf of the National Association for Music Education.

== Abstracting and indexing ==
Music Educators Journal is abstracted and indexed in:

- Academic Premier
- Arts and Humanities Search
- Educational Research Abstracts Online
- Education Resources Information Center
- General OneFile
- MLA International Bibliography
- Wilson Education Index
- Zetoc
