= Get Lost Magazine =

Magazine

- Categories: Adventure travel
- Frequency: Quarterly
- Publisher: Grin Creative
- Founder: Justin Jamieson
- Founded: 2004
- Country: Australia
- Based in: Melbourne
- Website: Get Lost Magazine

get lost Magazine is an independent adventure travel magazine based in the Melbourne suburb of Fitzroy in Victoria, Australia. The magazine, which comes out quarterly, is published by Grin Creative and was founded in 2004 by Publisher Justin Jamieson. The magazine is internationally circulated via print and also digitally through the Get Lost Travel Magazine app, available through iTunes and Amazon.

The magazine seeks out unique travel experiences around the globe for travellers wishing to explore and take holidays that are not found in brochures. It covers places to stay, bars, food, festivals, travel gadgets, eco-travel ideas, and a range of activities from all continents, so people can experience local cultures away from hordes of other travellers.

get lost Magazine Editor is Carrie Hutchinson, a widely published travel writer.

In October 2016 get lost Magazine celebrated its 50th issue.

== See also ==
- Ecotourism
