= Global Traveler USA =

US magazine

- Founder: Francis X. Gallagher
- Founded: 2004
- Company: FXExpress Publications
- Country: United States
- Based in: Yardley, Pennsylvania
- Website: www.globaltravelerusa.com
- ISSN: 1551-7187

Global Traveler USA is a monthly AAM-audited magazine published mainly for frequent business and luxury travelers.

== History ==
Global Traveler was founded by Francis X. Gallagher in 2004 with its headquarters located in Yardley, Pennsylvania, US.

== Services ==
Global Traveler brings its readers information about premium cabins, airlines and hotels around the world. The magazine also offers different awards to various companies for outstanding performances on annual basis.
