= Black Music Research Journal =

- Discipline: Musicology
- Language: English
- Edited by: Gayle M. Murchison

Publication details
- History: 1980–2016
- Publisher: University of Illinois Press (United States)
- Frequency: Biannually

Standard abbreviations
- ISO 4: Black Music Res. J.

Indexing
- ISSN: 0276-3605 (print); 1946-1615 (web)

Links
- Journal homepage; Online access at Project MUSE

The Black Music Research Journal was a biannual peer-reviewed academic journal published by the University of Illinois Press on behalf of the Center for Black Music Research at Columbia College Chicago. It covers the philosophy, aesthetics, history, and criticism of black music. It was established in 1980 by Samuel A. Floyd, Jr. and the editor-in-chief was Horace J. Maxile, Jr. (Columbia College Chicago). The journal was abstracted and indexed in Academic ASAP, Academic OneFile, Arts & Humanities Citation Index, Current Contents/Arts & Humanities, and Expanded Academic ASAP. It ceased publication with volume 36 (2016).
