= Sherrie Tucker =

American musicologist and jazz scholar (born 1957)

- Born: Sherrie Jean Tucker; March 18, 1957 (age 69); Modesto, California, U.S.

Academic background
- Education: San Francisco State University (BA, MA, MA); University of California, Santa Cruz (Ph.D.)

Sherrie Jean Tucker (born March 18, 1957) is a musicologist, music historian, book author, professor, and journal editor. Tucker is co-editor-in-chief of American Studies, a peer-reviewed academic journal.

== Education ==
Tucker holds three degrees from San Francisco State University, including: a BA in Creative Writing, graduating summa cum laude in 1991, an MA in Creative Writing in 1992, and an MA in Women's Studies in 1994. Tucker earned a Ph.D. from the University of California, Santa Cruz, in History of Consciousness in 1999.

== Academic career ==
From 1999 to 2001, Tucker was assistant professor of women's studies at Hobart and William Smith Colleges, Geneva, New York. Since 2001, Tucker has been a member of the faculty associated with American studies at the University of Kansas, Lawrence. From 2001 to 2004, she was assistant professor; from 2004 to 2013 she was associate professor; and from 2013 to present she has been professor. From 2004 to 2005, Tucker was the Louis Armstrong Visiting Professor at the Center for Jazz Studies, Columbia University.

== Selected works ==
Books

- Tucker, Sherrie; Nichole T. Rustin (2008). Big Ears: Listening for Gender in Jazz Studies. Durham, NC: Duke University Press. OCLC 209335152.
- Tucker, Sherrie (2013). Swing Shift: 'All-Girl' Bands of the 1940s. Durham, NC: Duke University Press. OCLC 42397506.
- Tucker, Sherrie (2014). Dance Floor Democracy: The Social Geography of Memory at the Hollywood Canteen. Durham, NC: Duke University Press. OCLC 870147133.

Articles

- Tucker, Sherrie (Autumn 1998). "Nobody's Sweethearts: Gender, Race, Jazz, and the Darlings of Rhythm". American Music. 16 (3): 255–288. doi:10.2307/3052637. JSTOR 3052637.

== Research collectives ==
Women Who Rock: Making Scenes, Building Communities Oral History Archive.
